= Abdul Aziz (general) =

Pakistani retired three-star general and civil servant

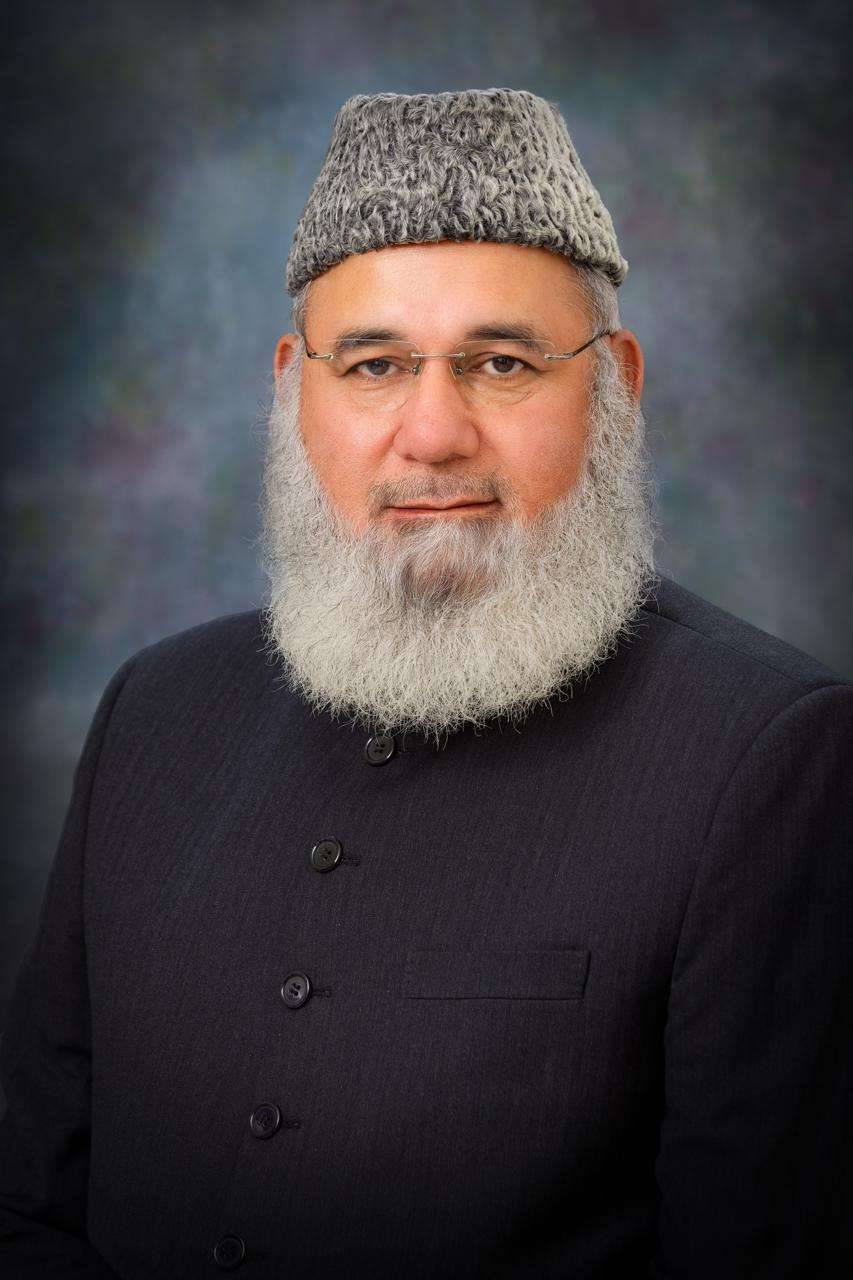

Chairman Punjab Public Service Commission
- Incumbent
- Assumed office May 2024

Commander IV Corps Lahore
- In office December 2020 – October 2022
- Preceded by: Majid Ehsan
- Succeeded by: Salman Fayyaz Ghanni

Personal details
- Education: Pakistan Military Academy; Command and Staff College Quetta
- Awards: Hilal-i-Imtiaz (Military)

Military service
- Allegiance: Pakistan
- Branch/service: Pakistan Army
- Years of service: 1987–2022
- Rank: Lieutenant General
- Unit: Artillery Regiment
- Commands: General Officer Commanding, 18th Infantry Division; Military Secretary, GHQ; Commander, IV Corps Lahore; Colonel Commandant, Pakistan Army Corps of Artillery

Muhammad Abdul Aziz is a retired general of the Pakistan Army who is currently serving as Chairman of the Punjab Public Service Commission since May 2024.

== Military career ==
Aziz was commissioned into the Artillery Regiment through the 75th PMA Long Course.

In 2018, he was promoted to the rank of Lieutenant General. Upon promotion, he was appointed as the Military Secretary, posted at the GHQ. In December 2020, he assumed office as commander of IV Corps, Lahore. Later, the then Chief of Army Staff, Qamar Javed Bajwa appointed him as Colonel Commandant of the Artillery Corps.

== Post-retirement ==
In May 2024, he was appointed as Chairman of the Punjab Public Service Commission, tasked with overseeing civil service recruitment in the province.
