= Syed Aamer Raza =

Pakistani military officer

Syed Aamer Raza NI(M) HI(M) SBt

Commander of National Strategic Command
- Incumbent
- Assumed office 27 July 2026
- President: Asif Ali Zardari
- Prime Minister: Shehbaz Sharif
- Preceded by: Position Established

41st Chief of the General Staff
- In office 24 January 2025 – 24 July 2026
- Chief of Army Staff: FM Asim Munir
- Preceded by: Lt.Gen Muhammad Avais Dastgir
- Succeeded by: Lt.Gen Omer Ahmed Bokhari

27th Commander of the IV Corps, Lahore
- In office 16 May 2023 – 23 January 2025
- Chief of Army Staff: General Asim Munir
- Preceded by: Lt.Gen Salman Fayyaz Ghanni
- Succeeded by: Lt.Gen Fayyaz Hussain Shah

Chairman, Heavy Industries Taxila
- In office 5 May 2020 – 16 May 2023
- President: Arif Alvi
- Prime Minister: Imran Khan
- Preceded by: Lt.Gen Abdullah Dogar
- Succeeded by: Maj Gen Shakir Ullah Khattak

Personal details
- Education: Officers Training School, Mangla, Command and Staff College Quetta; University of Nottingham; National Defence University
- Awards: See list

Military service
- Allegiance: Pakistan
- Branch/service: Pakistan Army
- Years of service: 1989 — present
- Rank: General
- Unit: 6th Lancers (Watson's Horse)
- Commands: National Strategic Command; IV Corps
- Battles/wars: Operation Zalzala; Operation Rah-e-Nijat; Fifth Balochistan Conflict; Operation Zarb-e-Azb; Operation Radd-ul-Fasaad; Operation Azm-e-Istehkam; 2025 India–Pakistan conflict; 2025 Afghanistan–Pakistan conflict; 2026 Afghanistan–Pakistan war

General Syed Aamer Raza is a four-star military officer in the Pakistan Army, serving as the Commander of the National Strategic Command at the National Command Authority since 27 July 2026. Previously, Raza served as the 41st Chief of General Staff, Commander IV Corps and Chairman Heavy Industries Taxila.

== Military career ==
Aamer Raza is from the 22nd course of the Officers Training School (OTS) in Mangla and was commissioned in the 6th Lancers in 1988. He is a graduate of the Command and Staff College, Quetta and National Defence University, Islamabad. He holds a degree in International Relations from the University of Nottingham, MSc in Arts and Science of Warfare and Defence and Strategic Studies; both from National Defence University.

He has commanded the 6th Lancers from November 2007 to September 2009. He has also commanded an armored brigade, an infantry brigade in South Waziristan. Later, Major General Raza commanded 37th Mechanized Division Kharian. He has served as the Chief of Staff (COS) at ll Corps, and as Director General of the Weapons & Equipment Directorate at GHQ, Rawalpindi.

He has been an instructor at the School of Armour and Mechanized Warfare, Nowshera. Raza has also been Director Faculty of Research and Doctrinal Studies and Chief Instructor at the Command and Staff College Quetta.

Raza was appointed as the Chairman of Heavy Industries Taxila by the Government on 5 May 2020. On 11 October 2022, he was promoted to the rank of Lieutenant General.

As Chairman HIT, Lt.General Raza played an instrumental role in the upgradation and modernization of Al-Khalid Tank series. Under Chairmanship of Lt.General Raza, HIT locally produced Haider tank, based on a variant of VT4 Tank of China under the transfer of technology agreement, conferring Pakistan with advance tank manufacturing capabilities.

On 16 May 2023, Raza was appointed as the Commander of the IV Corps, Lahore, following the 9 May riots in Pakistan, replacing Corps Commander Lt.General Salman Fayyaz Ghani.

On 24 January 2025, Raza was appointed as the Chief of the General Staff(CGS), replacing Lt.Gen Avais Dastgir who was appointed as Commander V Corps, Karachi.

On 24 July 2026, the Prime Minister of Pakistan Shehbaz Sharif promoted Lt.General Raza to the rank of a four-star General and appointed him as the first Commander of the National Strategic Command. He assumed office on 27 July.

On 31 July 2026, President Asif Ali Zardari approved the conferment of the Nishan-i-Imtiaz (Military) upon General Syed Aamer Raza.

== Awards ==

Hilal-i-Imtiaz (Military) (Crescent of Excellence) (2021)	Sitara-e-Basalat (Star of Valour) (2025)	Nishan-i-Imtiaz (Military) (Order of Excellence) (2026)
