= Sadiq Ali (general) =

Pakistani retired three-star general

Chairman Pakistan Ordnance Factories
- In office 2018–2019
- Preceded by: Umar Farooq Durrani
- Succeeded by: Bilal Akbar

Commander IV Corps Lahore
- In office September 2015 – September 2017
- Preceded by: Naweed Zaman
- Succeeded by: Aamer Riaz

Personal details
- Education: Pakistan Military Academy; Command and Staff College Quetta; National Defence University; Turkish War College
- Awards: Hilal-i-Imtiaz (Military)

Military service
- Allegiance: Pakistan
- Branch/service: Pakistan Army
- Years of service: 1984–2019
- Rank: Lieutenant General
- Unit: Armoured Corps
- Commands: GOC 1st Armoured Division; GOC 35th Infantry Division; Commandant Pakistan Military Academy; Vice Chief of General Staff at GHQ; Commander IV Corps Lahore; Inspector General Arms at GHQ; Chairman Pakistan Ordnance Factories

Sadiq Ali is a retired three star general of the Pakistan Army who served as the Commander of the IV Corps in Lahore. Before retiring from active military service, he headed the Pakistan Ordnance Factories.

== Education ==
Ali went to the Command and Staff College Quetta and National Defence University for higher education. He was sent to the Turkish War College for advance military training.

== Military career ==
Ali was commissioned into the Armoured Corps via 69th PMA Long Course in March 1984.

As a major general, he commanded the 1st Armoured Division and 35th Infantry Division. Division. He commanded the Pakistan Military Academy, an academy for training the officers of Pakistan Army. He later held the office of Vice Chief Of General Staff, posted at GHQ.

Later, his rank was elevated to lieutenant general and he was appointed as Commander of the IV Corps in Lahore. Later he was shifted to the GHQ and was assigned the appointment of Inspector General Arms.

In 2018, he was appointed as Chairman of the Pakistan Ordnance Factories, a position he held until his retirement in 2019.

Ali was awarded the Hilal-i-Imtiaz (Military) for his distinguished service in the Pakistan Army.

== Post military career ==
After retirement, Ali served as the Secretary of Defence Production at Ministry of Defence Production, assigned at Rawalpindi.
