= Naweed Zaman =

Pakistan Army retired general

Lieutenant General Naweed Zaman
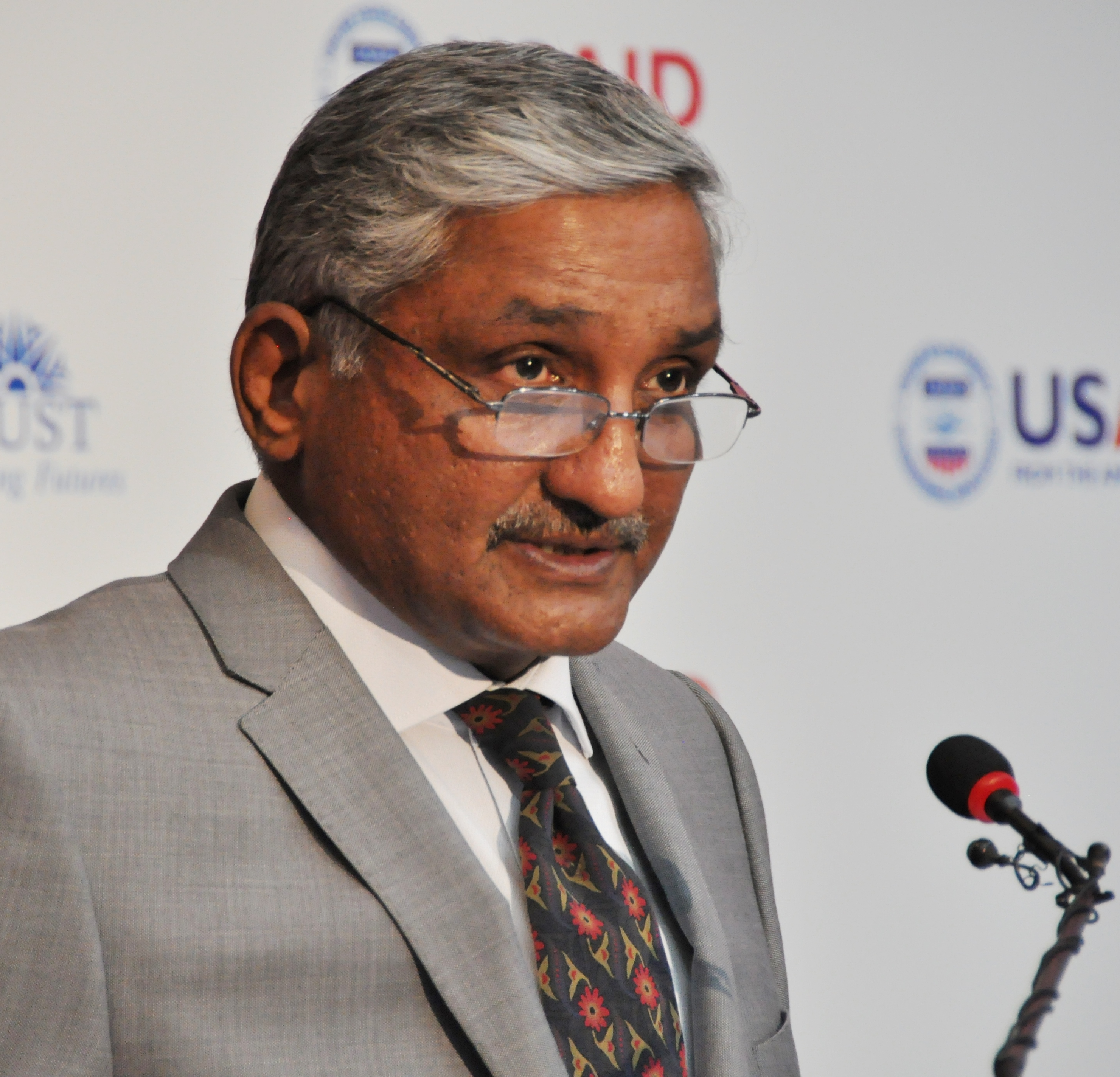
- Zaman in 2017

Rector NUST
- In office November 2016 – December 2020

Personal details
- Awards: Hilal-e-Imtiaz

Military service
- Allegiance: Pakistan
- Branch/service: Pakistan Army
- Years of service: 1980 - 2016
- Rank: Lt. Gen.
- Commands: GOC 7th Infantry Division Corps Commander IV Corps Military Secretary GHQ
- Battles/wars: Operation Rah-e-Nijat (Path to Salvation)

Naweed Zaman is a retired three-star rank general of the Pakistan Army.

== Military career ==
Zaman was formally commissioned into the Pakistan Armed Forces in 1980, after graduating from the Pakistan Military Academy (PMA) with a Sword of Honour, at which he later also served an instructor at the School of Infantry and Tactics.

He also attended the National Defence University, Pakistan (NDU), Joint Services Command and Staff College, UK (JSCSC) and Royal College of Defence Studies, UK (RCDS).

He served as General Officer Commanding (GOC) of the 7th Infantry Division, Corps Commander of the IV Corps and as Military Secretary at Army General Headquarters (GHQ).

During his service as the GOC of the 7th Infantry Division, he partook in Operation Rah-e-Nijat (Path to Salvation) which cleared out the Tehrik-i-Taliban Pakistan (TTP) and other associated militant groups from Pakistan's South Waziristan Agency, and brought it back under the control of the Government of Pakistan.

Zaman is a recipient of the Hilal-i-Imtiaz (Star of Crescent) by the Government of Pakistan.

In September 2014, Zaman was reportedly shortlisted as a candidate by Prime Minister Nawaz Sharif to succeed Inter-Services Intelligence (ISI) Director General Zaheer-ul-Islam, who was about to retire. Ultimately Major General (Later Lt. Gen.) Rizwan Akhtar was selected and appointed to the job.

Among the officers fired for corruption

== Academic career ==
He was appointed Rector of the National University of Sciences and Technology (NUST) in November 2016. He left the position in December 2020.

== Personal life ==
Zaman graduated from Cadet College Hasan Abdal (CCH) prior to his military service, is married and has three children.
