= Ijaz Ahmed Bakshi =

Pakistani general

Ijaz Ahmed Bakhshi

Commander IV Corps
- In office March 2008 – April 2010
- Preceded by: Shafaat Ullah Shah
- Succeeded by: Rashad Mahmood

Personal details
- Education: Pakistan Military Academy; Command and Staff College, Quetta; National Defence College
- Awards: Hilal-i-Imtiaz (Military)

Military service
- Allegiance: Pakistan
- Branch/service: Pakistan Army
- Years of service: 1972 — 2010
- Rank: Lieutenant General
- Unit: Artillery Corps
- Commands: Director General National Accountability Bureau; Director General, Weapons and Equipment Directorate; Commander IV Corps Lahore

Lieutenant General Ijaz Ahmed Bakhshi HI(M) is a retired officer of the Pakistan Army who served as Commander of the IV Corps and Director General of the Weapons and Equipment Directorate at GHQ.

== Military career ==
Lieutenant General Ijaz Ahmed Bakhshi was commissioned into the Artillery Corps in 1972. He is a graduate of the Command and Staff College, Quetta and the National Defence College, Islamabad.

He commanded various field formations and held key staff assignments. He served as Director General of the National Accountability Bureau (NAB) in Karachi.

He was promoted from Major General to the rank of Lieutenant General in 2006.

He was later appointed Director General of the Weapons and Equipment Directorate at GHQ, where he oversaw procurement and modernization programs. He served as Chief of Logistic Staff, a key appointment at General Headquarters. In March 2008, he assumed command of the IV Corps in Lahore, a key field formation of the Pakistan Army.

He retired from military service in 2010.

== Awards and decorations ==
He was conferred the Hilal-i-Imtiaz (Military), one of the highest military decorations in Pakistan, for his meritorious service.
