= IV Corps (Pakistan) =

Pakistan Army's Holding Field Corps

- Badge of IV Corps
- Active: January 1966; 60 years ago–present
- Country: Pakistan
- Branch: Pakistan Army
- Type: Holding Corps
- Role: Maneuver/Deployment oversight.
- Size: ~45,000 approximately (Though this may vary as units are rotated)
- Corps Headquarters: Lahore Cantonment, Punjab, Pakistan
- Nickname: Lahore Corps
- Colors Identification: Red, white and silver
- Engagements: Indo-Pakistani War of 1971
- Decorations: Military Decorations of Pakistan Military

Commanders
- Commander: Lt-Gen. Umer Bashir
- Chief of Staff: Brigadier shujah
- Notable commanders: Gen. Tikka Khan; Lt-Gen. Moinuddin Haider

The IV Corps is a field corps of the Pakistan Army, headquartered in Lahore, Punjab, Pakistan. Having established in January 1966, it is Pakistan army's of one of ten field corps formations which saw its deployment against the Indian Army in 1971.

It is currently being commanded by Lieutenant-General Umer Bashir appointed in October 2026.

== Overview ==
=== History and war service ===
This corps was created in the early part of 1966. It was the second corps level formation created by the Army GHQ, followed by the II Corps, to strengthened the national defenses of Pakistan, focusing only in Punjab.

During the second war with Indian Army, the I Corps maneuvered the entire armored and infantry units which found to be unwieldy and extremely ineffective to control the army elements to coordinate the missions together.

The 4th artillery of the Regiment of Artillery, that played a crucial role in supporting the 6th Armored Division in Battle of Chawinda attached to I Corps, played a crucial role in establishing the IV Corps.

The IV Corps is headquartered in Lahore Cantonment since January 1966 when Lieutenant-General Attiqur Rahman was appointed as its first commander.

The IV Corps saw its deployment in 1971 against the Indian Army to maneuver the military elements to strengthened the defences of Lahore sector.

== Structure ==
The corps order of battle is.

Corps IV Commander, Lahore
Lt. Gen. Muhammad Umer Bashir
Structure
Assigned Units	Unit Badge	Unit HQ
2nd Artillery Division		Gujranwala
10th Infantry Division		Lahore
11th Infantry Division		Lahore
212th Infantry Brigade		Lahore
3rd Independent Armoured Brigade		Chunian
Independent Air Defence Brigade		U/I Location
Independent Signal Brigade		U/I Location
Independent Engineering Brigade		U/I Location

== List of corps commanders ==
#	Name	Start of tenure	End of tenure
1	Lt Gen Attiqur Rahman	January 1966	August 1969
2	Lt Gen Tikka Khan	August 1969	March 1971
3	Lt Gen Bahadur Sher	March 1971	January 1972
4	Lt Gen Abdul Hameed Khan	January 1972	January 1974
5	Lt Gen Iqbal Khan	March 1976	January 1978
6	Lt Gen Sawar Khan	January 1978	March 1980
7	Lt Gen S.F.S. Lodhi	March 1980	March 1984
8	Lt Gen Mohammad Aslam Shah	March 1984	March 1986
9	Lt Gen Alam Jan Masud	March 1986	July 1990
10	Lt Gen Mohammad Ashraf	July 1990	January 1993
11	Lt Gen Humayun Khan Bangash	January 1993	January 1996
12	Lt Gen Moinuddin Haider	January 1996	March 1997
13	Lt Gen Mohammad Akram	March 1997	October 1998
14	Lt Gen Khalid Maqbool	October 1998	August 2000
15	Lt Gen Aziz Khan	August 2000	October 2001
16	Lt Gen Zarrar Azim	October 2001	December 2003
17	Lt Gen Shahid Aziz	December 2003	October 2005
18	Lt Gen Syed Shafaat Ullah Shah	October 2005	March 2008
19	Lt Gen Ijaz Ahmed Bakshi	March 2008	April 2010
20	Lt Gen Rashad Mahmood	April 2010	January 2013
21	Lt Gen Maqsood Ahmad	January 2013	September 2013
22	Lt Gen Naweed Zaman	September 2013	September 2015
23	Lt Gen Sadiq Ali	September 2015	September 2017
24	Lt Gen Aamer Riaz	September 2017	December 2018
25	Lt Gen Majid Ehsan	December 2018	December 2020
26	Lt Gen Muhammad Abdul Aziz	December 2020	October 2022
27	Lt Gen Salman Fayyaz Ghanni	October 2022	May 2023
28	Lt Gen Syed Aamer Raza	May 2023	January 2025
29	Lt Gen Syed Fayyaz Hussain Shah	January 2025	October 2026
30	Lt Gen Umer Bashir	October 2026	Incumbent
