= Attiqur Rahman =

Pakistani general and military governor

Lieutenant General Mohammed Attiqur Rahman HQA SPk MC

11th & 14th Governor of Punjab
- In office 1 July 1970 – 23 December 1971
- President: Agha Yahya Khan; Zulfikar Ali Bhutto
- Preceded by: Mushtaq Ahmed Gurmani
- Succeeded by: Ghulam Mustafa Khar

Personal details
- Born: Mohammad Attiqur Rahman; 24 June 1918 Rawalpindi, Punjab, British India
- Died: 1 June 1996 (aged 77) Lahore, Punjab, Pakistan
- Education: St Paul's School; Indian Military Academy
- Awards: Hilal-e-Quaid-e-Azam; Sitara-e-Pakistan; Military Cross

Military service
- Allegiance: British India (1940–1947); Pakistan (1947–1971)
- Branch/service: (British Raj) British Indian Army; Pakistan Army
- Years of service: 1940–1971
- Rank: Lieutenant General
- Unit: Infantry (4/12 FF Regiment)
- Commands: Vice Chief of General Staff (VCGS); 15th Infantry Division, Sialkot; 7th Infantry Division, Peshawar; Adjutant General (AG); 12th Infantry Division, Murree; IV Corps, Multan (later Lahore); I Corps, Mangla
- Battles/wars: World War II; Burma campaign; Indo-Pakistani War of 1947; Indo-Pakistani War of 1965; Indo-Pakistani War of 1971
- Post-Retirement Work: Civil servant and former Governor of the Punjab, former National Accountability Bureau

Mohammed Attiqur Rahman (Punjabi, Urdu: محمد عتیق الرحمان) (24 June 1918 – 1 June 1996), also known by his nickname as General Turk, was a senior general in the Pakistan Army, a noted military historian, and a senior government official. He was the martial law administrator (MLA) of West Pakistan in General Yahya Khan's military regime. He was educated at St.Paul's school, London and joined IMA in 1939 with a sword of Honour and then joined 4th/12th FFR. He was the last Governor of West Pakistan and implemented the dissolution of the One Unit scheme, after which he became the first Governor of Punjab province.

== Early life ==
Born on 24 June 1918, Rahman was the son of Lt Colonel Abdur Rahman, RIAMC. Rahman was schooled at St Paul's in London, UK, and then joined the Prince of Wales Royal Indian Military Academy, Dehradun, British India, where he was awarded the Sword of Honor and the silver spurs as the best all-round Gentleman Cadet.

== Military service ==
Commissioned on 1 February 1940, Rahman joined the 4/12th Frontier Force Regiment (a.k.a. "Charwanja") and was posted to Thall, Kurram Agency, (Ahmedzai Operations) then to Datta Khel (Lower Tochi Operations). In November 1941, his battalion went to join General Slim's Fourteenth Army to fight in Burma. His best friend in the battalion was Major Sam Manekshaw, later a field marshal, with whom he had a lifelong friendship.

In 1966, promoted to lieutenant general, he commanded his first corps, IV Corps, then headquartered at Multan (later it was moved to Lahore). When General Yahya Khan's martial law was instituted on 25 March 1969, Rahman was appointed Martial Law Administrator (MLA), Zone A (West Pakistan), due to his position as Commander IV Corps. In August 1969, Rahman was relieved by Tikka Khan and moved to I Corps at Mangla. Rahman stayed there until February 1970. He was then replaced by Lt Gen Irshad Ahmed Khan. Rahman was appointed as the Governor of West Pakistan in February 1970, replacing Air Marshal Nur Khan. He stayed as governor until the breakup of One Unit in 1971, and then became Governor of Punjab. He retired from the army and from the governorship in December 1971.

== Military analyst ==
After retirement in December 1971, he wrote extensively on military issues. In 1977, General Muhammad Zia-ul-Haq appointed him as Chairman of the Federal Public Services Commission, holding this position until 1985.

== Awards and decorations ==
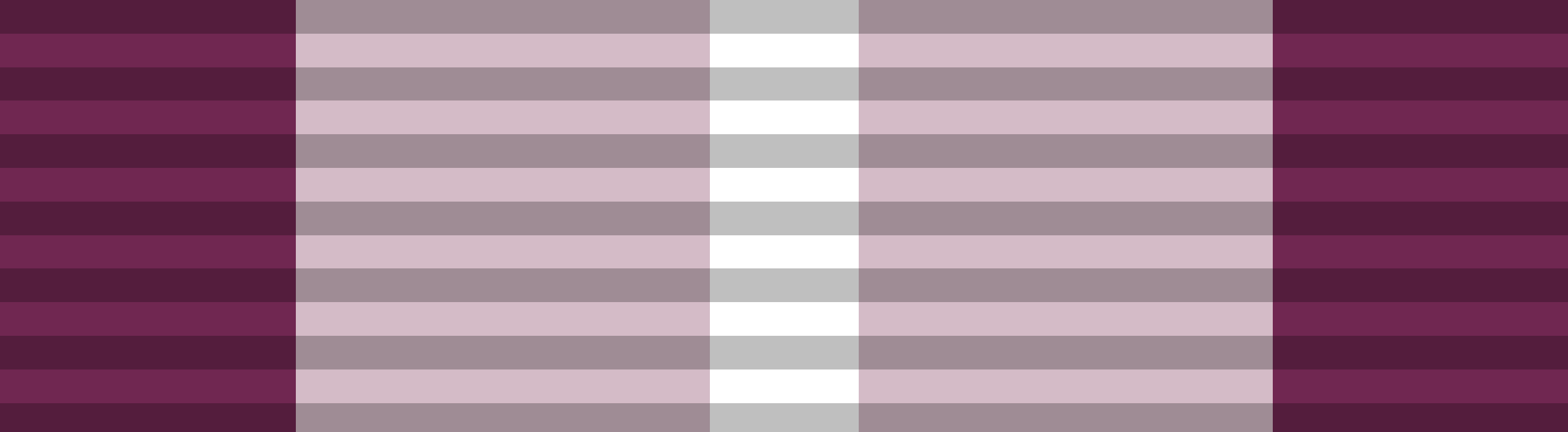

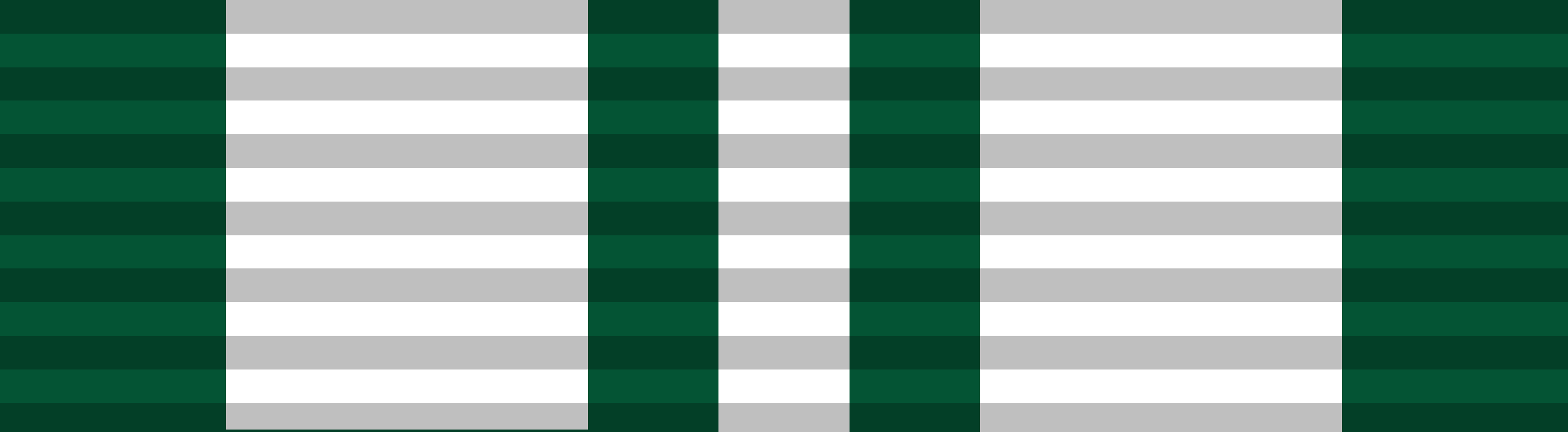

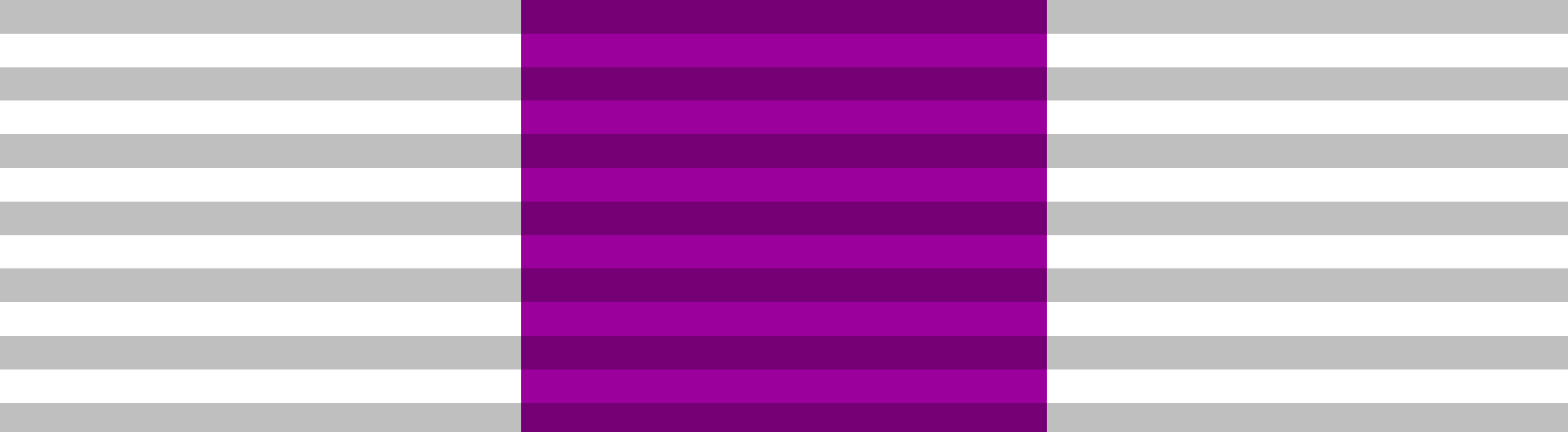

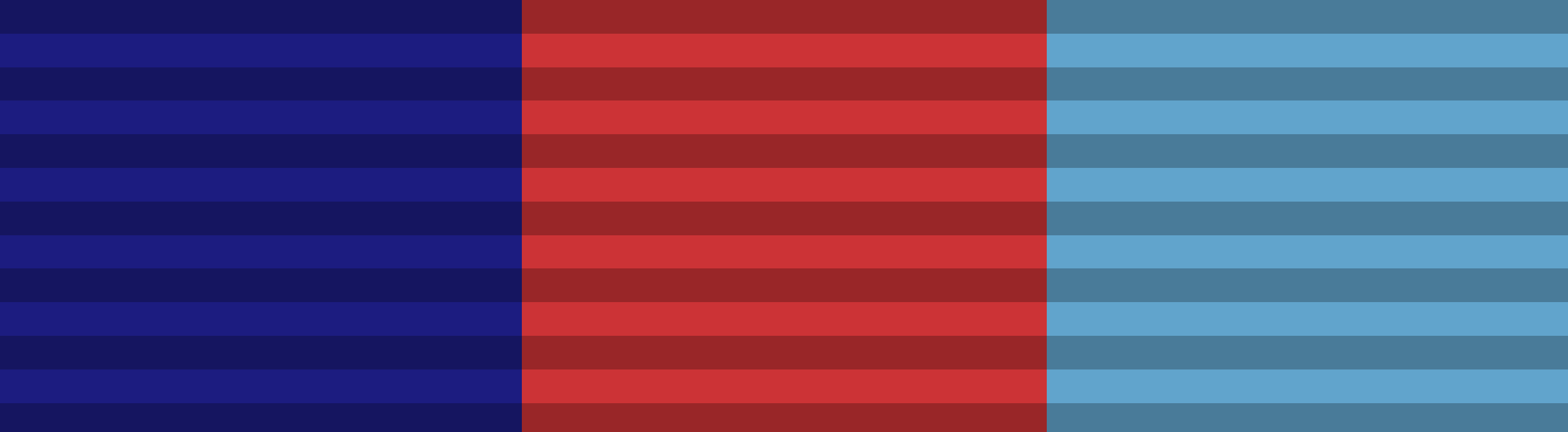

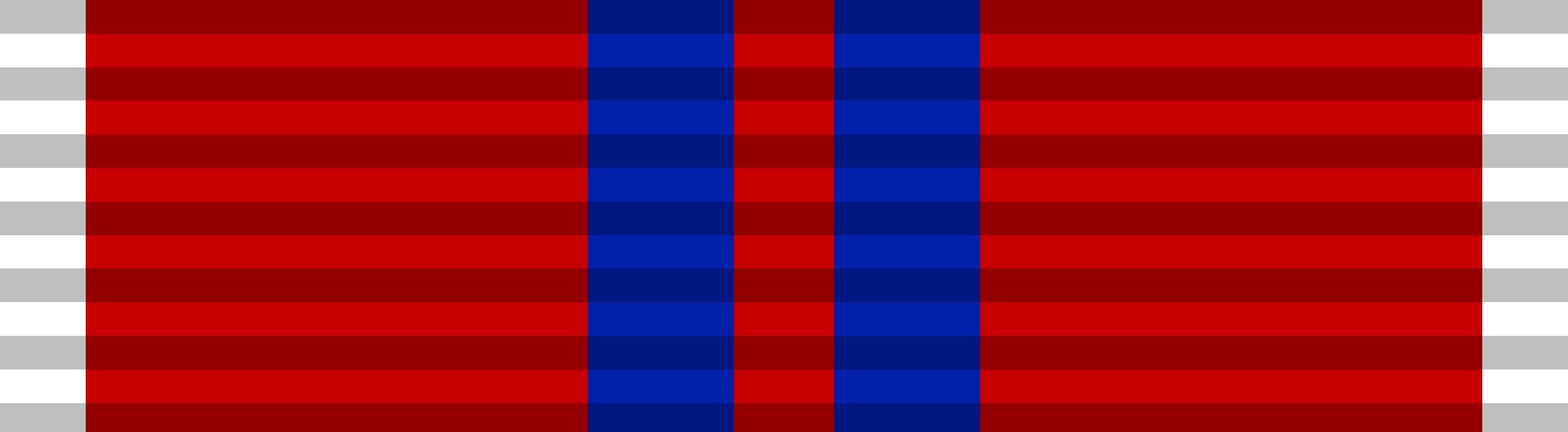

	Hilal-e-Quaid-e-Azam (HQA)		
Sitara-e-Pakistan (SPk)	Tamgha-e-Diffa (General Service Medal): 1. 1965 War Clasp	Sitara-e-Harb 1965 War (War Star 1965)	Tamgha-e-Jang 1965 War (War Medal 1965)
Pakistan Tamgha (Pakistan Medal) 1947	Tamgha-e-Jamhuria (Republic Commemoration Medal) 1956	'Military Cross' (MC)	1939-1945 Star
Burma Star	War Medal 1939-1945	India Service Medal 1939–1945	Queen Elizabeth II Coronation Medal (1953)

=== Foreign Decorations ===
Foreign Awards
UK	'Military Cross' (MC)
UK	1939-1945 Star
UK	Burma Star
UK	War Medal 1939-1945
UK	India Service Medal 1939–1945
UK	Queen Elizabeth II Coronation Medal

== Works ==
- Rahman, Mohammed Attiqur (1973). Leadership: Junior Commanders.
- Rahman, Mohammed Attiqur (1973). Leadership: Senior Commanders.
- Rahman, Mohammed Attiqur (1976). Our Defence Cause: An analysis of Pakistan's past and future military role.
- Rahman, Mohammed Attiqur (1978). Reflections on Infantry.
- Rahman, Mohammed Attiqur (1980). Wardens of the Marches: a history of the Piffers, 1947-1971.
- Rahman, Mohammed Attiqur (1981). Reflections on the principles of surprise and deception.
- Rahman, Mohammed Attiqur (2005). Back to the pavilion. Oxford University Press. ISBN 0-19-597861-7.

Political offices
Preceded by Office established	Martial Law Administrator, Zone A (West Pakistan); 1969	Succeeded by Tikka Khan
Preceded by Yusuf Haroon	Governor of West Pakistan; 1969	Succeeded by Tikka Khan
Preceded by Nur Khan	Governor of West Pakistan; 1970	Succeeded by Office dissolved
Preceded by Part of West Pakistan	Governor of Punjab; 1970 – 1971	Succeeded by Ghulam Mustafa Khar
