= Shahid Aziz =

Pakistani general (born 1948)

Lieutenant General Shahid Aziz HI(M) TBt
- شاہد عزیز
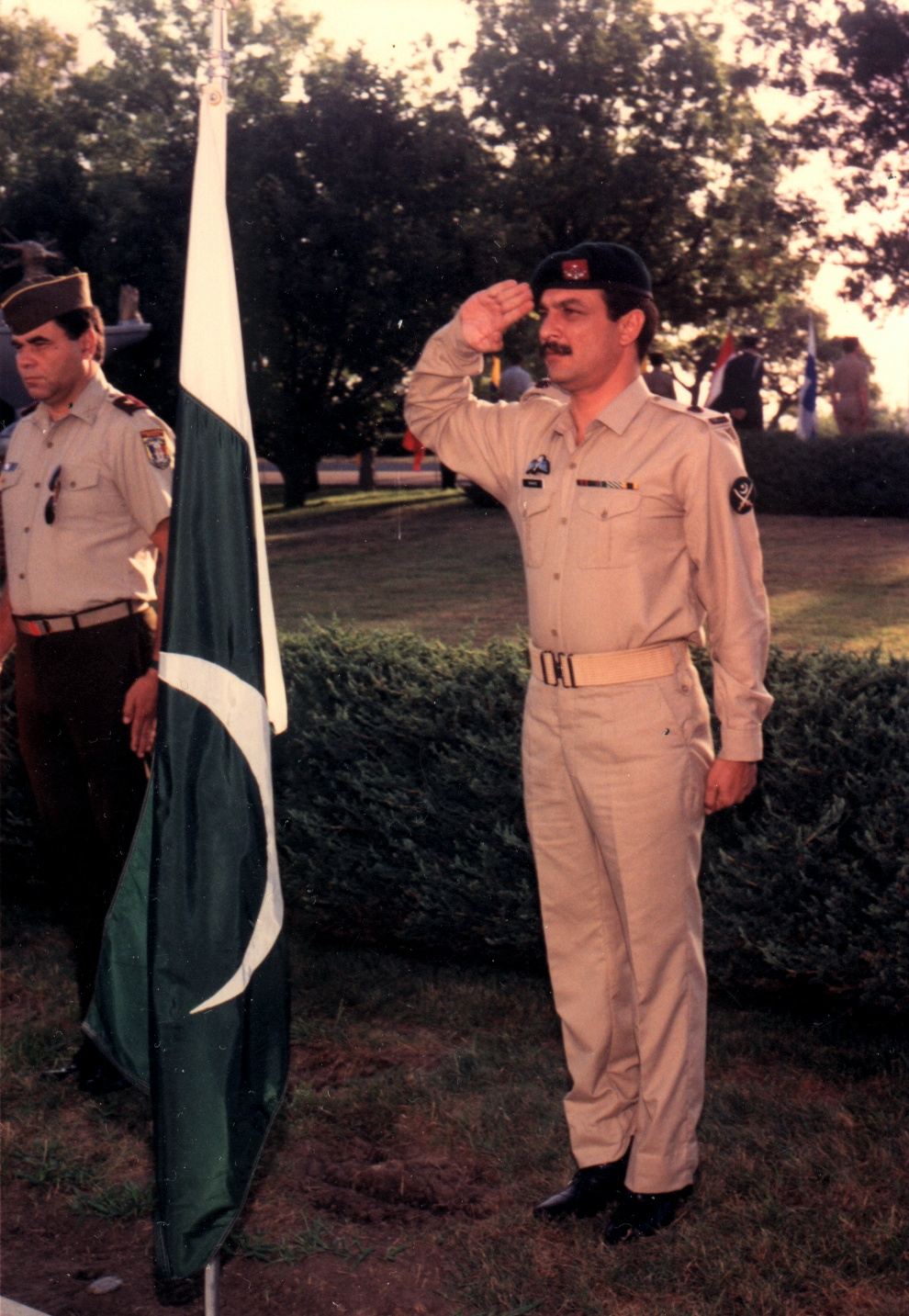
- Major Aziz at Fort Leavenworth in Kansas, 1988

Chairman National Accountability Bureau
- In office 5 November 2004 – 4 July 2007
- Preceded by: Lt-Gen. Munir Hafiez
- Succeeded by: Naveed Ahsan

Corps Commander Lahore
- In office December 2003 – October 2005
- Preceded by: Zarrar Azim
- Succeeded by: Shafaat Ullah Shah

Chief of General Staff Pakistan Army
- In office October 2001 – December 2003
- Preceded by: Yusaf Khan
- Succeeded by: Tariq Majid

Personal details
- Born: 30 December 1948 Lahore, Pakistan
- Died: 31 December 2018 (aged 70)
- Education: Pakistan Military Academy; US Army Command and General Staff College; US Army School of Infantry; National Defence University, Islamabad
- Website: https://gen-shahidaziz.blogspot.com/

Military service
- Branch/service: Pakistan Army
- Years of service: 1971–2005
- Rank: Lieutenant General
- Unit: Baloch Regiment
- Commands: IV Corps; Chief of General Staff; 12th Infantry Division (Pakistan)
- Battles/wars: Indo-Pakistani War of 1971; Kargil War; 2001–2002 India–Pakistan standoff
- Awards: See list

Shahid Aziz (Note: Urdu: شاہد عزیز) (30 December 1948 - 31 December 2018) was a Pakistani military author and a public official who served as the Chairman of National Accountability Bureau (NAB) from 2004 to 2007. Aziz, a soldier who was trained in the United States in infantry tactics, saw military actions in war theater with India in 1999 through 2001. After retiring from the military, Aziz was the chairman of the National Accountability Bureau but was forced to resign amid controversy.

== Early life ==
Shahid Aziz was born on 30 December 1948, to Brigadier Muhammad Ishaq Khan.

== Military career ==
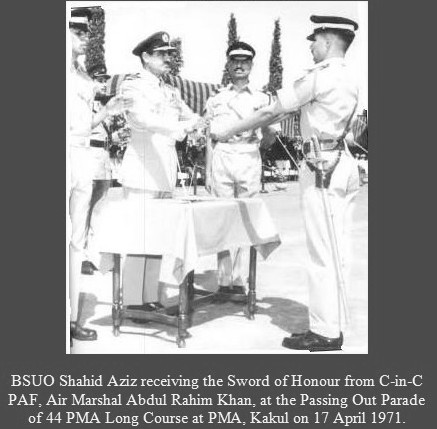

Aziz joined the 44th Long Course of the Pakistan Military Academy. He graduated on 17 April 1971 at the top of his course as the Battalion Senior Under Officer, winning the Sword of Honour and the Presidents Gold Medal for his performance. He was commissioned in the 10 Battalion of the Baloch Regiment with which he actively participated in the 1971 India-Pakistan War and later on also commanded. He attended the Company Commander Course at Fort Benning, Georgia (USA) and the Command and General Staff Course at Fort Leavenworth, Kansas (USA). Aziz is also a graduate of the National Defence University, Pakistan. His military career has placed him in pivotal posts during critical periods in Pakistan. He served as the General Officer Commanding of the 12th Infantry Division stationed at Murree. During the Kargil conflict of 1999, he served as DG of the Inter-Services Intelligence (ISI) Agencies' Analysis Wing. That same year, he was appointed to the role of Director General Military Operations where he played a crucial role in the October 1999 Pakistani coup d'état that brought Pervez Musharraf to power. After the events of the September 11 attacks in 2001, he was serving as General Officer Commanding 12 Division when the United States invaded Afghanistan.

In October 2001, Aziz was promoted to Lieutenant General and appointed Chief of General Staff. On 18 December 2003, he assumed command of IV Corps, Lahore. He finally retired from the army in 2005 during which time he also launched a massive inquiry against corruption in the Defence Housing Authority, Lahore.

== Post-retirement ==
Aziz, created ripples by acknowledging in an article that regular troops were involved in the Kargil operation and the "misadventure" was a "four-man show" and details were initially hidden from the rest of the military commanders. He published a book Yeh Khamoshi Kahan Tak? Aik Sipahi ki Dastan-e-Ishq o Junoon (English: How Long Will You Remain Silent? A Soldier's Saga of Love and Passion). General Musharraf, who served as the Chief of Army Staff during Kargil War, has refuted Lt. Gen. Aziz's claims in his book and referred to him as "unbalanced" during an interview when questioned about what had been claimed by Gen Shahid in his book. Shahid Aziz resigned from the Chairmanship of NAB on moral principles when requested to shut down all cases of Benazir Bhutto and Asif Ali Zardari amid back channel negotiations between Musharraf and Benazir Bhutto prior to passing of the National Reconciliation Ordinance.

In an answer to a question about his role in the coup by General Musharraf in violation of the law, Lt. Gen. Aziz said that he believed the constitution is a "rotten product." He was falsely accused by the Land Mafia Head of Bahria Residential Society for misuse of authority in attaining financial benefits for himself and his son-in-law after he ordered corruption inquiry against the same renowned land grabber while being the Chairman of National Accountability Bureau. However, the General never bothered to deny the false claims of the accuser. Moreover, contrary to false news publication, no inquiry was ever conducted against the General.

== Awards and decorations ==
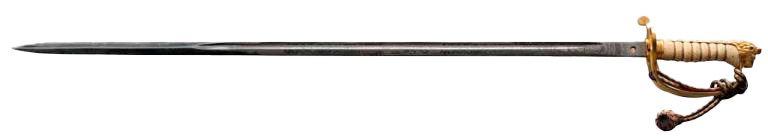

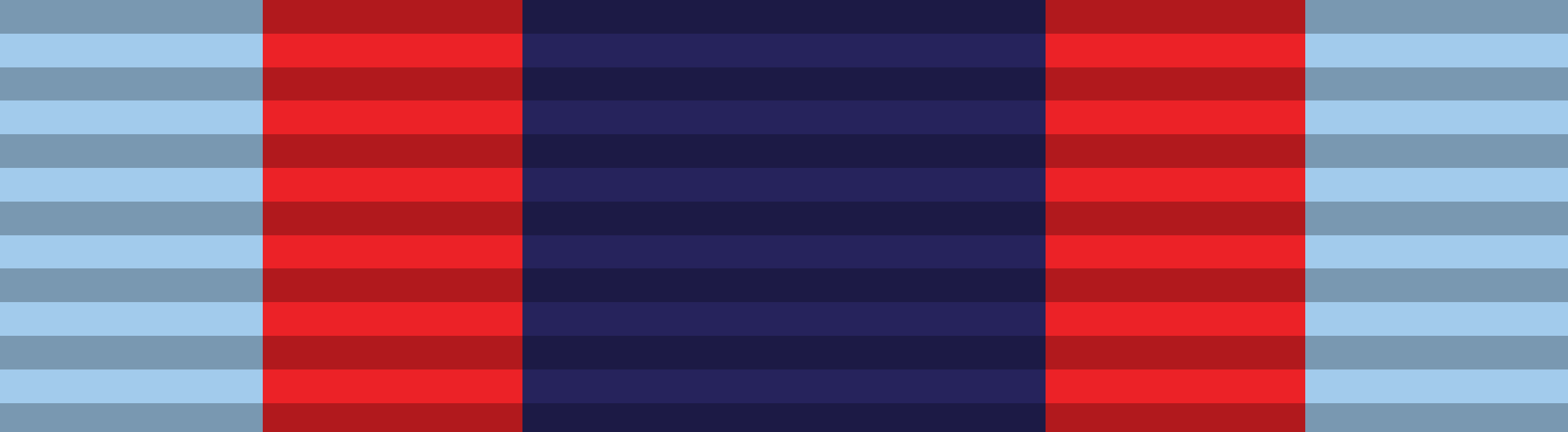

Sword of Honour; Pakistan Military Academy; 1971
| Hilal-i-Imtiaz (Military) (Crescent of Excellence); 2002 | Tamgha-e-Basalat (Medal of Valour) | | Sitara-e-Harb 1971 War (War Star 1971) |
| Tamgha-e-Jang 1971 War (War Medal 1971) | Tamgha-e-Baqa (Nuclear Test Medal) 1998 | Tamgha-e-Istaqlal Pakistan (2001–2002 India–Pakistan standoff) | 10 Years Service Medal |
| 20 Years Service Medal | 30 Years Service Medal | 35 Years Service Medal | Tamgha-e-Sad Saala Jashan-e-Wiladat-e-Quaid-e-Azam (100th Birth Anniversary of Muhammad Ali Jinnah) |
| Hijri Tamgha (Hijri Medal) 1979 | Tamgha-e-Jamhuriat (Democracy Medal) 1988 | Qarardad-e-Pakistan Tamgha (Resolution Day Golden Jubilee Medal) 1990 | Tamgha-e-Salgirah Pakistan (Independence Day Golden Jubilee Medal) 1997 |

== Notes ==
Military offices
| Preceded by Yusaf Khan | Chief of General Staff (Pakistan); 2001 – 2003 | Succeeded by Tariq Majid |
| Preceded by Zarrar Azim | Commander; IV Corps (Pakistan); 2003 – 2005 | Succeeded by Shafaat Ullah Shah |
