= Shafaat Ullah Shah =

Pakistani general (born 1953)

Shafaat Ullah Shah HI(M)
- شفاعت اللہ شاہ
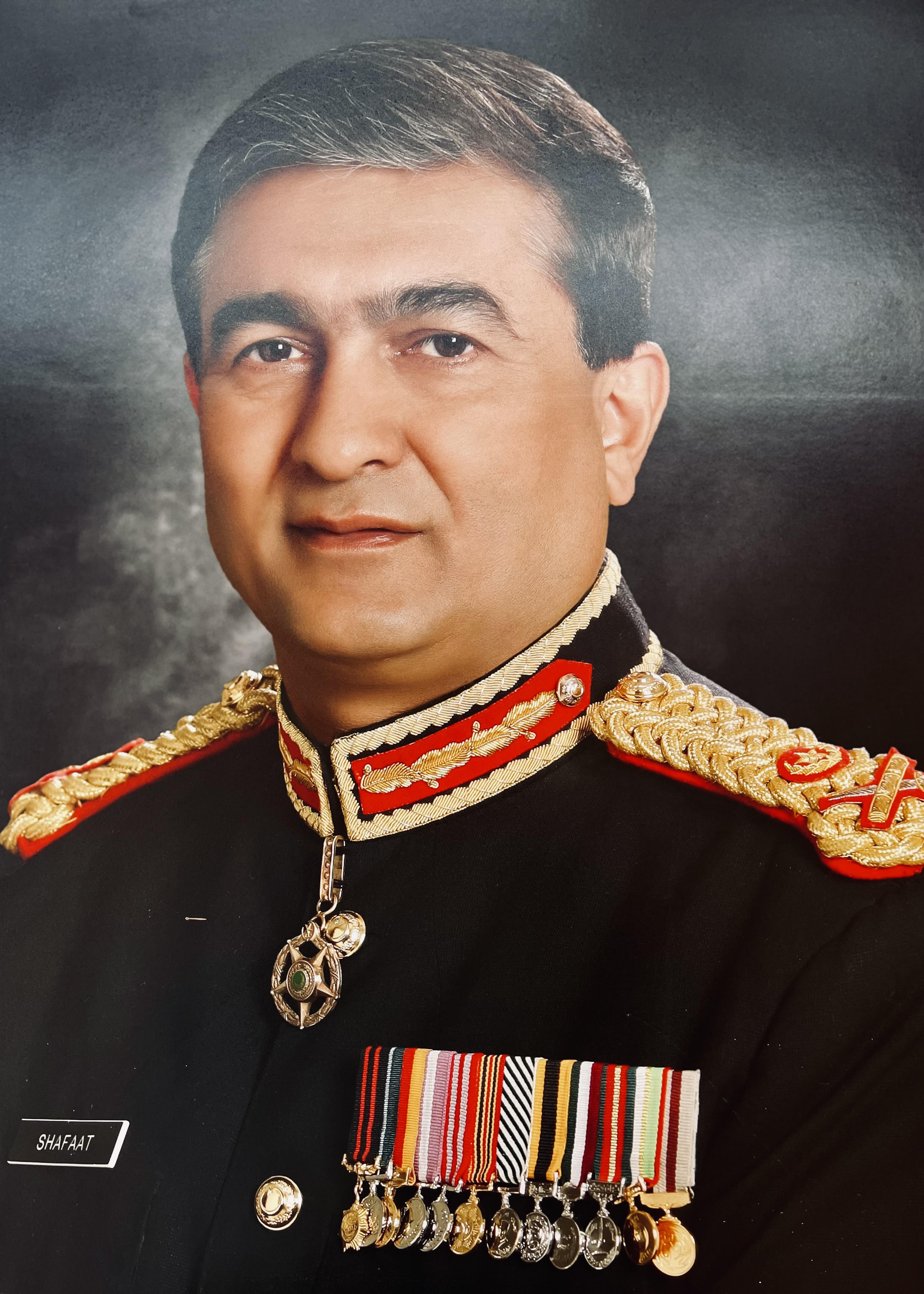

Ambassador of Pakistan to Jordan & Palestine
- In office September 2015 – September 2017
- Succeeded by: (R) Major General Junaid Rehmat

Chief Logistics Staff at the GHQ
- In office 24 March 2008 – 9 November 2009
- Succeeded by: Lieutenant General Alam Khattak

Commander IV Corps
- In office November 2005 – 23 March 2008
- Preceded by: Lieutenant General Shahid Aziz
- Succeeded by: Lieutenant General Ijaz Ahmed Bakshi

Military Secretary to President Musharraf
- In office 23 December 2003 – 8 November 2005
- Preceded by: Major General Nadeem Taj

General officer commanding of 11th Infantry Division
- In office February 2002 – 23 December 2003
- Preceded by: Major General ANS Mela

Personal details
- Born: 28 August 1953 (age 72) Lahore, Pakistan
- Spouse: Fariha Bokhari (m. 1980)
- Children: 3
- Parent: Shafqat Ullah Shah (father)
- Relatives: (r) Brigadier Liaqat Bokhari (SJ) (father-in-law)
- Education: Quaid-i-Azam University; Balochistan University; National Defence College of Pakistan; Camberley Staff College
- Occupation: Author; diplomat

Military service
- Allegiance: Pakistan
- Branch/service: Pakistan Army
- Years of service: 1971 – 2009
- Rank: Lieutenant General
- Unit: Baloch Regiment
- Commands: Chief of Logistics Staff GHQ; Col Commandant Baloch Regiment; Commander IV Corps; Military Secretary to President Musharraf; GOC 11th Infantry Division; Deputy Chief of Staff to President Musharraf; Chief of Staff XXX Corps; Senior Instructor Quetta Command & Staff College; Instructor School of Infantry & Tactics Quetta; ADC to Khan of Kalat
- Battles/wars: Indo-Pakistani War of 1971; India–Pakistan standoff of 2001
- Awards: Hilal-e-Imtiaz

Shafaat Ullah Shah (Urdu: شفاعت اللہ شاہ; born 28 August 1953) is a retired three star general of the Pakistan Army, diplomat, and author. He often writes for the Pakistan Armed Forces magazine, "Hilal English". He has served as Chief of Logistics Staff at the GHQ, Colonel Commandant of the Baloch Regiment, Commander IV Corps, and as Military Secretary to President Musharraf.

== Early life and education ==
Shah was born into a Syed family on 28 August 1953 in Lahore, Pakistan, to Syed Shafqat Ullah Shah who migrated from Hyderabad Deccan to Lahore in 1948. His father was an employee of the Prisons Department of Punjab and later became Inspector general of the Punjab Prisons from May 1981 to May 1983.

He was enrolled in the Abbottabad Public School in class 7, and did his Faculty of Sciences (FSc) from there before he joined the Army. He wanted to become a doctor but wasn't selected into King Edward Medical University so his father made him join the Pakistan Army. He is also an honors graduate of the Staff College in Camberley and the National Defence College.

He holds master's degrees in political science and in strategic studies.

== Personal life ==
Shah is married to the daughter of (r) Brigadier Liaqat Bokhari (SJ).

== Military career ==
Shah was commissioned into the Baloch Regiment of the Pakistan Army in 1971 from the 47th Long Course of the Pakistan Military Academy. It was the most junior course to fight in the Indo-Pakistani War of 1971. He served as the Colonel commandant of the Baloch Regiment. His last appointment in the Army was as Chief of Logistics Staff at the General Headquarters in Rawalpindi.

=== Aide to the Governor of Balochistan ===
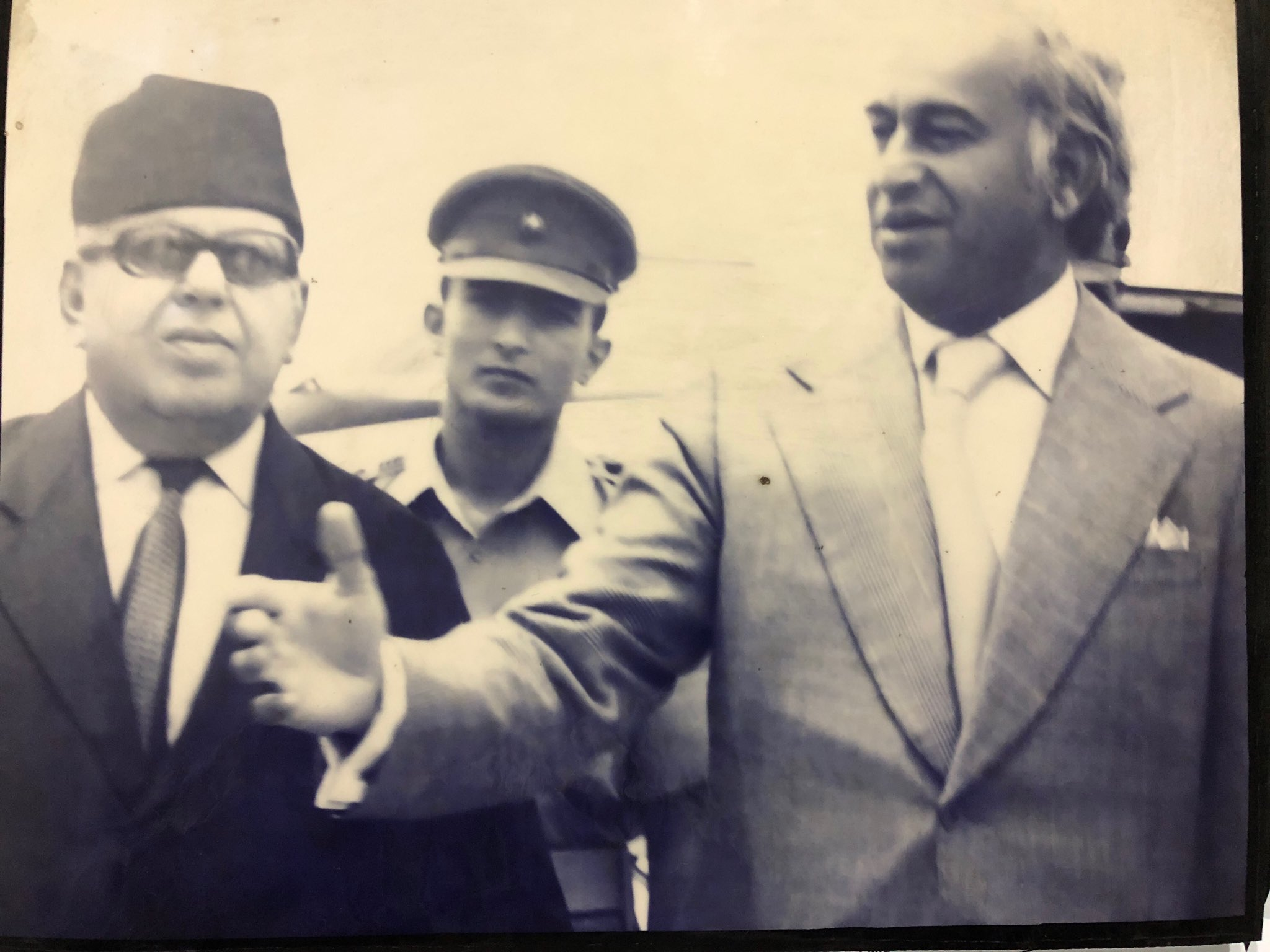
Captain Shafaat (middle) pictured next to the Governor of Balochistan Khan of Kalat (left) and Prime Minister of Pakistan Zulfikar Ali Bhutto (right)

Shah had served as ADC to the Governor of Balochistan, Ahmad of Kalat, from 1974 to 1976.

=== Aide to Musharraf ===
Shah was appointed as Military Secretary to President Musharraf, replacing Nadeem Taj. He took charge on 25 December 2003, the same day when there was a suicide attack on Musharraf in Rawalpindi. As his aide, he was actively involved in his two major diplomatic initiatives. First, to normalize strained relations with neighboring India, back-channel diplomacy was initiated to resolve the contentious issue of Kashmir. He participated in many meetings between Musharraf and Indian Prime Minister Manmohan Singh on the sidelines of UN General Assembly meetings and in Dehli in 2005.

The back-channel contacts and meetings lead to the formalization of the Musharraf-Manmohan 'Four Point' Formula which was to be inked during Manmohan Singh's visit to Pakistan in July 2007 but due to the events leading up to the 2007 Pakistani state of emergency & judicial crisis in Pakistan, the scheduled visit was cancelled and with it extinguished the hope of a resolution to the Kashmir dispute. Second, Musharraf's initiative of a rapprochement with Israel through informal contacts. Musharraf attended a dinner by the Jewish community in honor of him in New York on the sidelines of the September 2005 UN General Assembly meeting.

=== As Commander IV Corps ===
Shah was made Commander IV Corps after the retirement of Commander IV Corps Lt. Gen. Shahid Aziz.

As Commander IV Corps he conceptualised and made first ever medical college associated with Combined Military Hospital Lahore in a span of five months .

He established the Cardiac Centre, Trauma, and Diagnostic centers at CMH Lahore. During Shah's tenure, to support a government initiative to establish a new university in Pakistan, the Pakistan Army's Lahore Corps donated 80 Acres of Defence Housing Authority land to the Graz University of Technology to establish its campus. He also established a first ever polytechnic providing technical skills to the youth from all over Pakistan, by Army, with free boarding and lodging.

=== Retirement ===
Shah retired on 9 November 2009 after serving as Chief Logistics Staff at the GHQ.

== Later life ==
After Shah's retirement, he served as the Ambassador of Pakistan to the Kingdom of Jordan. He is the author of "Soviet Invasion of Afghanistan", published in 1983. He has also written regularly for various magazines and newspapers. He was part of the Ottawa Dialogue on Track II diplomacy.

=== Ambassador to Jordan ===
Shah was Ambassador to the Kingdom of Jordan, also accredited to the State of Palestine. At a ceremony marking the 70th Independence Day of Pakistan, he congratulated Jordanian writer Omar Nazar al Armouti for his book on the unresolved issues of Kashmir and Palestine. He was involved in the sale of Cobra helicopters and F-16 aircraft from Jordan to Pakistan.

=== 2021 Pandora Papers leaks ===
It was reported in the Pandora Papers leaks by the ICIJ that Shah's wife bought a flat in London through an offshore transaction in 2007, allegedly for $1.2 million. He wrote on Twitter that the property's value was less than half of what was quoted in the leak, and that it is not illegal to buy property in the United Kingdom through an offshore company. According to him, he had bought the flat as an investment property in order to pay for his son's education. and it had been declared in all of his tax returns and even to the Army Authorities at the time of purchase .

He also doubted the intentions of the journalists who reported the story. He further tweeted that "one of the journalists involved with investigations, Malia Pulitzer, has recently stayed in India for 2 years and it is a typical RAW practice to malign Pakistan Army officers with criminals".

The names of more than 700 Pakistanis, including PPP and PTI ministers, were brought to light by the ICIJ in October 2021.

== Effective dates of promotion ==
Insignia	Rank	Date
	Lieutenant General	November 2005
	Major General	January 2000
	Brigadier	July 1995
	Colonel	Promoted directly to Brigadier
	Lieutenant Colonel	August 1988
	Major	July 1977
	Captain	June 1973
	Lieutenant	January 1972
	Second Lieutenant	14 November 1971

== Awards and decorations ==

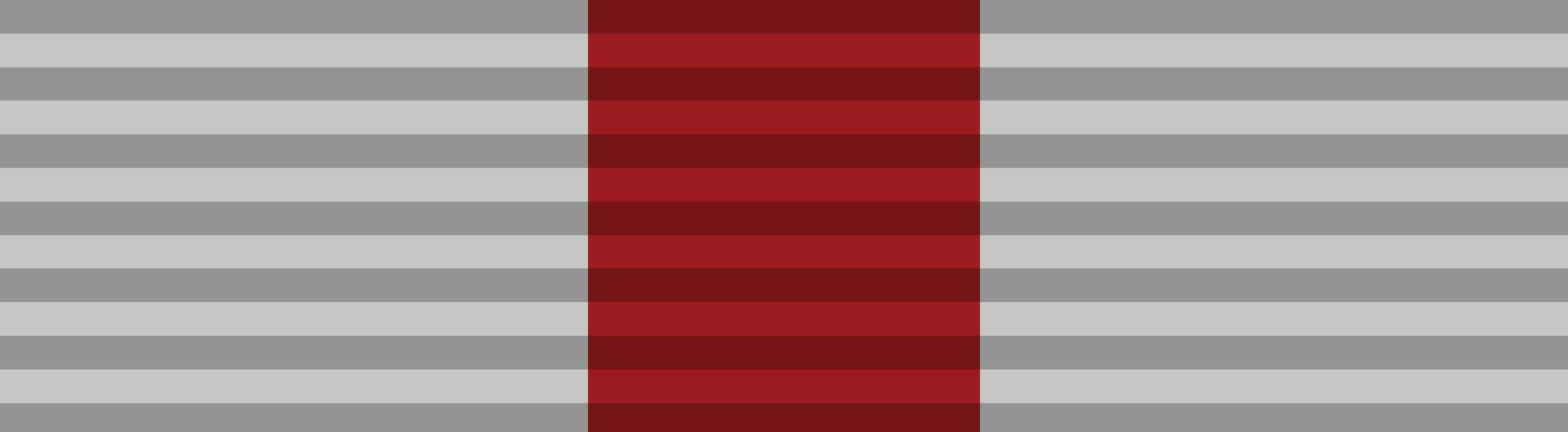

Hilal-e-Imtiaz (Military) (Crescent of Excellence)	Sitara-e-Harb 1971 War (War Star 1971)		Tamgha-e-Jang 1971 War (War Medal 1971)
Tamgha-e-Baqa (Nuclear Test Medal) 1998	Tamgha-e-Istaqlal Pakistan (Escalation with India Medal) 2002	10 Years Service Medal	20 Years Service Medal
30 Years Service Medal	35 Years Service Medal	Tamgha-e-Sad Saala Jashan-e- Wiladat-e-Quaid-e-Azam (100th Birth Anniversary of Muhammad Ali Jinnah) 1976	Hijri Tamgha (Hijri Medal) 1979
Jamhuriat Tamgha (Democracy Medal) 1988	Qarardad-e-Pakistan Tamgha (Resolution Day Golden Jubilee Medal) 1990	Tamgha-e-Salgirah Pakistan (Independence Day Golden Jubilee Medal) 1997	Command & Staff College Quetta Student Medal
