= National Strategic Command =

Range of the Shaheen III Missile

The National Strategic Command is a joint command of the Pakistan Armed Forces which is responsible for the operational control of Pakistan's strategic land, sea, and air based nuclear assets. The command is headed by four star officer. Since 27th July 2026, General Syed Aamer Raza assumes office as first Commander of National Strategic Command.

The post of commander of the National Strategic Command was created under the 27th Constitutional Amendment last year, which marked a major reorganization of the military’s top command. The reforms abolished the office of the chairman of the Joint Chiefs of Staff Committee, designated the chief of army staff as the country’s chief of defense forces with overall command across the armed services and created the post of commander of the National Strategic Command.

Prime Minister Shehbaz Sharif promoted Gen Raza from the rank of lieutenant general and simultaneously appointed him to the new position. However, officials maintain that the broader institutional framework would remain unchanged, with the prime minister continuing as chairman of the National Command Authority, the Strategic Plans Division retaining its role as secretariat, and the authority to employ nuclear weapons remaining vested in the National Command Authority rather than any individual office.

== Organizational structure ==
- Army Strategic Forces Command (Pakistan)
- Air Force Strategic Command (Pakistan)
- Naval Strategic Forces Command (Pakistan)

== List of combatant commanders ==
| Number | Command flag | Rank | Name | term start | term end | Position | Decorations | Unit |
|---|---|---|---|---|---|---|---|---|
| 01 | | General | Syed Aamer Raza | 27 July 2026 | present | Commander, National Strategic Command | Hilal-e-Imtiaz (Military) Sitara-e-Basalat Nishan-i-Imtiaz (Military) | 22 OTS 6th Lancers (Watson's Horse) |

== See also ==
- Pakistan and weapons of mass destruction
- Pakistan Atomic Energy Commission
