= 7th Infantry Division (Pakistan) =

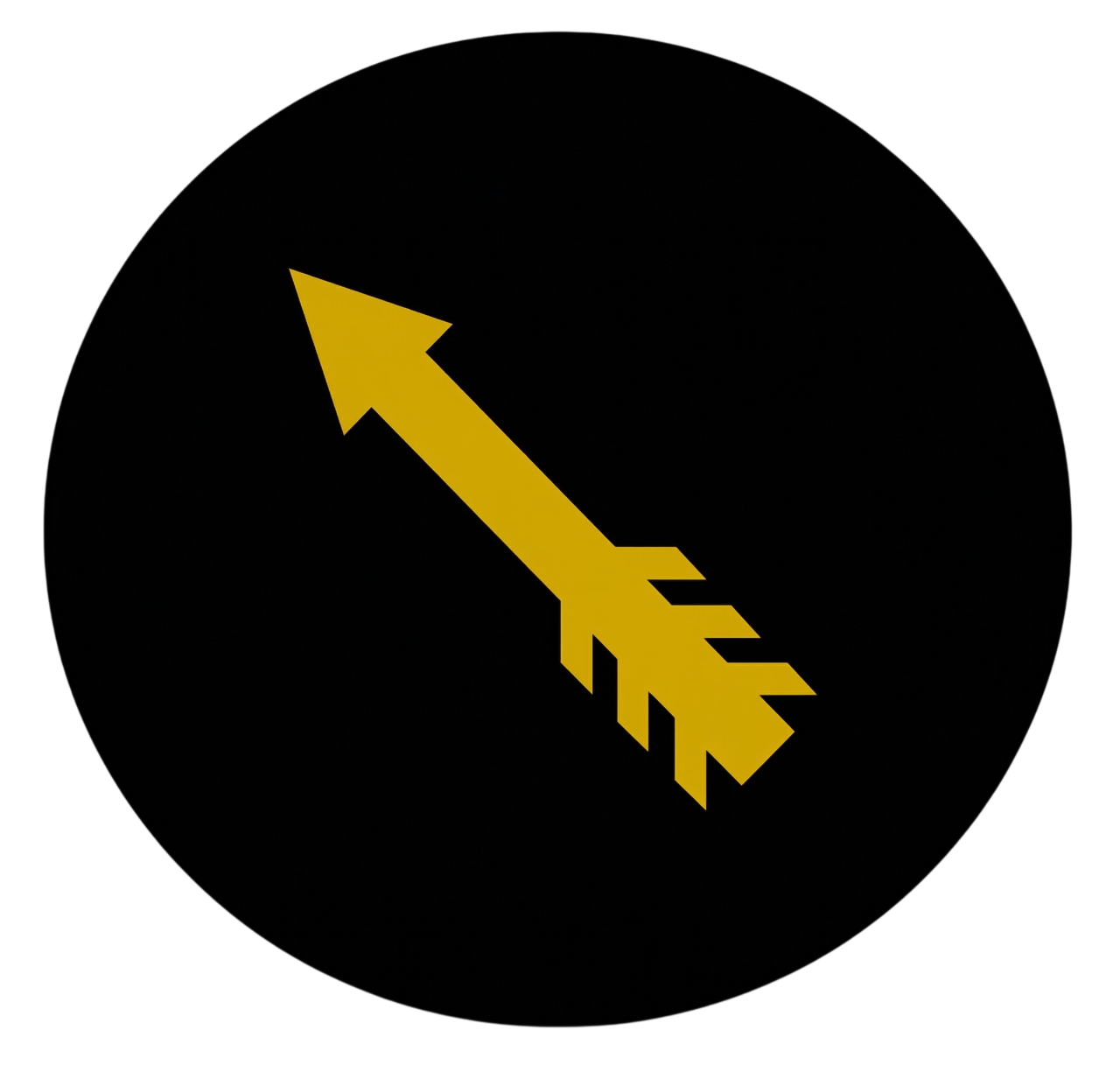
- Insignia for 7th Infantry Division
- Active: 1940- Present
- Country: Pakistan
- Allegiance: United Kingdom; British India; Pakistan
- Branch: Pakistan Army
- Type: Division
- Role: Infantry, though supporting, artillery and armour elements are attached
- Size: 20,000 men (though this may vary as units are rotated)
- Part of: XI Corps (Pakistan)
- Headquarters: Peshawar, Khyber-Pakhtunkhwa
- Nickname: Golden Arrow
- Colors: black and gold
- Engagements: World War II; Indo-Pakistani War of 1947; Indo-Pakistani War of 1965; Indo-Pakistani War of 1971; Siachen conflict Gulf War 1991; Indo-Pakistani War of 1999; War on terror Operation Azm-e-Istehkam

Commanders
- General Officer Commanding: Major-General Adil Iftikhar Warriach

- Colonel Staff: Colonel Mazhar
- Notable commanders: Gen. Yahya Khan; Gen. Asif Nawaz; Lt Gen Agha Ibrahim Akram; Lt Gen Attiqur Rahman; Lt Gen Munir Hafiez; Lt Gen Ghayur Mahmood; Maj-Gen Abdul Qadir; Maj-Gen Akram Sahi; Maj-Gen Azhar Ali Shah; Lt. General Naweed Zaman Maj Gen Naeem Akhtar

Insignia
- War Flag: Flag of 7 INF DIV

The 7th Infantry Division, also known as the Golden Arrow (after its formation sign) and Peshawar Division, (after its garrison city) is one of the Pakistan Army's oldest and most battle-hardened division. The officers and soldiers of the Golden Arrow Division have fought in all of Pakistan's Wars and have an unmatched combat service record.

== Second World War origins ==
The division was raised on 1 October 1940 at Attock, in present-day Pakistan as the 7th Indian Infantry Division, part of the British Indian Army. Its formation sign was an arrow, pointing bottom left to top right, in yellow on a black background. The division was known as the "Golden Arrow" division from this sign.

After initially training for operations in the deserts in the Middle East, in early 1943 it was reassigned to the Burma Campaign. After extensive training and preparation, it fought in the Arakan from December 1943. After the divisional HQ was overrun by a Japanese attack, units of the division took part in the Battle of the Admin Box. The division later moved to Assam and fought in the Battle of Kohima. In 1945 it played a prominent part in the Battle of Central Burma and the subsequent advance down the Irrawaddy River.

After the war ended, the division moved to Thailand, where it disarmed the Japanese occupying army, and liberated and repatriated Allied prisoners of war.

== From 1947 with Pakistan ==
After the independence of Pakistan in 1947, the division under the command of Major General Frederick Loftus-Tottenham, was one of two allocated to the new Pakistan army.

The 7th Infantry Division is currently being commanded by Major General Shakir, AC.

The Division first saw action during the Indo-Pakistan War of 1948, where it fought and captured some territory in the Poonch sector.

In the intervening years, the formation became part of the Pakistan Army's strategic reserve. At the outbreak of the Indo-Pakistani War of 1965, the Peshawar Division was commanded by a native Peshawarite; Major General Yahya Khan. In it, the Golden Arrow's were the lead division of the Operation Grand Slam, where they and two divisions which had been placed under the division's command managed to achieve the most dramatic breakthrough of the war when they defeated the Indian formations in front of them, capturing the district of Chamb, and pushed up to a position 6 km beyond Jammu City, by the end of hostilities. Its commander, General Yahya Khan would be awarded the Hilal-e-Jurat for this achievement.

6 years later, during the Indo-Pakistan War of 1971 the Peshawar Division would once again be called into action. Once again Pakistan's strategic reserve, along with 1st Armoured Division, would not see action as a unit but many of its sub-units would enter combat in various sectors.

The formation would go overseas for the third time in its history (and for the second time as a Pakistani division) when it deployed with two brigades to Saudi Arabia for the 1991 Gulf War.

It would be the better part of a decade, before the formation would get the call to arms again, but when it came it was at the highest battlefield of the world, and several units would serve in that area. In 1999 during the Kargil War, the division was sent as a reinforcement to the Gultari area.

After 9/11, and the United States led invasion of Afghanistan, the Golden Arrows would be called into a period of almost continuous action in difficult and mountainous terrain, carrying out operations in Waziristan and the North West Frontier Province (now called: Khyber-Pakhtunkhwa), against Al-Qaeda and Taliban escaping from Afghanistan. Most of the Al-Qaeda operatives have been captured by elements of this formation.

Under its corps headquarters, XI Corps, the Division took part in the 2009 South Waziristan offensive.

== List of General Officers Commanding (incomplete) ==
Following officers have commanded the division

- Maj. Gen. Frederick Loftus-Tottenham
- Maj. Gen. Mian Hayauddin, HJ, MC
- Maj. Gen. Habibullah Khan Khattak
- Maj. Gen. Attiqur Rahman
- Maj. Gen. Altaf Qadir
- Maj. Gen. Yahya Khan
- Maj Gen. M Jamshed, MC
- Maj Gen. Khadim Raja
- Maj. Gen. Rakhman Gul
- Maj. Gen. Agha Ibrahim Akram
- Maj. Gen. EH Dar
- Maj. Gen. Asif Nawaz
- Maj. Gen. Abdul Qadir
- Maj. Gen. Munir Hafiez
- Maj. Gen. Asif Durraiz
- Maj. Gen. Akram Sahi
- Maj. Gen. Naweed Zaman
- Maj. Gen. Azhar Ali Shah
- Maj. Gen. Ghayur Mahmood
- Maj. Gen. Hassan Azhar Hayat
- Maj. Gen. Zafar ul Haq
- Maj. Gen. Shakirullah Khattak
- Maj. Gen. Naeem Akhtar
- Maj. Gen. Anjum Riaz
- Maj. Gen. Adil Iftikhar Warraich

== Order of battle ==
It is unsure what the exact composition of the formation is, since the Peshawar Division has received several additional troops during the ongoing war on terror, but the peacetime order of battle is:

- HQ 7th Infantry Division; Peshawar
  - 6 Infantry Brigade; Kanju, Swat
  - 10 Infantry Brigade; Datta Khel
  - 27 Infantry Brigade; Landi Kotal
  - 102 Infantry Brigade; Peshawar
  - Division Troops; under HQ command, but usually parcelled out to the Brigades.

Locations and designations of brigades are not confirmed. Though, the Division Headquarter is based in Miran shah, NWA. At an unspecified point in time, the 6th Infantry Brigade was relocated to its new headquarters at the newly built Swat Cantonment. The brigade was recently deployed to assist in disaster relief efforts during the 2022 Pakistan floods.
