= Nadeem Taj =

Pakistani director of Inter-Services Intelligence

Nadeem Taj HI(M), Tbt

Director General of the ISI
- In office October 2007 – October 2008
- President: Pervez Musharraf; Asif Ali Zardari

Commander XXX Corps
- In office October 2008 – April 2010

Director General Military Intelligence
- In office December 2003 – February 2005

Personal details
- Born: Nadeem Taj; 29 April 1953 (age 73) Lahore, Punjab, West Pakistan
- Awards: Hilal-e-Imtiaz (Military); Tamgha-e-Basalat (Tbt)

Military service
- Allegiance: Pakistan
- Branch/service: Pakistan Army
- Years of service: 1972 – 2011
- Rank: Lt. Gen.
- Unit: Punjab Infantry Regiment (11 Punjab)
- Commands: Adjutant-General of the Army; Military Secretary to the PM; DG MI; DG ISI; Commander 11th Infantry Division; Pakistan Military Academy; XXX Corps
- Battles/wars: Indo-Pakistani War of 1999; 1999 Pakistani coup d'état War in North-West Pakistan

Nadeem Taj, HI(M) Tbt (born 29 April 1953) is a retired three-star general in the Pakistan Army who served as its Adjutant General (AG) in the GHQ. Previously, he headed the ISI and the Military Intelligence. He was also the Commander of the XXX Corps at Gujranwala.

== Career ==
Taj was commissioned in the Pakistan Army's Punjab Regiment in August 1972 in the 2nd Special War Course. His name came into prominence when he as a Brigadier General was accompanying then Chairman of Joint Chiefs of Staff and Chief of Army Staff General Pervez Musharraf on his way back from Sri Lanka on 12 October 1999 when their plane was denied landing on the orders of Nawaz Sharif at Jinnah Terminal, Karachi, brewing a crisis that ultimately led to overthrow of the Government of Premier Nawaz Sharif.

Taj was also with Musharraf during the assassination attempts on him in December 2003.

== Chief of Intelligence ==
Taj was promoted to Major General on 1 February 2002 and was already serving as the Military Secretary (MS) to the President of Pakistan (different from Military Secretary (MS), GHQ). It was during this time when Musharraf's convoy was attacked in Rawalpindi.

Shortly after that incident, Taj was appointed Director General of Military Intelligence (DGMI) in December 2003 in the place of Tariq Majid who was promoted to Lieutenant General and took charge as the new Chief of General Staff. Major General Shafaat Ullah Shah took the place of Taj and became the new Military Secretary to the President. Taj continued as the DGMI until February 2005, when he was replaced by Major Gen Mian Nadeem Ijaz Ahmed.

== Command and staff appointments ==
On 29 September 2008, The Australian reported that "Washington is understood to be exerting intense pressure on Pakistan to remove ISI boss Nadeem Taj and two of his deputies because of the key agency's alleged "double-dealing" with the militants."

Taj took over the XXX Corps after the incumbent Lt Gen Waseem Ahmad Ashraf retired from the army on 4 October 2008. He was later relieved of his duties and made the Adjutant General (AG) of the Pakistan Army on 29 April 2010, replacing Lt Gen Javed Zia who in turn was appointed as Commander Southern Command in Quetta.

Military offices
Preceded by Ashfaq Parvez Kayani	Director General of the Inter-Services Intelligence; 2007–2008	Succeeded by Ahmad Shuja Pasha
