= Bahadur Sher =

Pakistani general (1922–1983)

Bahadur Sher SPk MC
- بہادر شیر
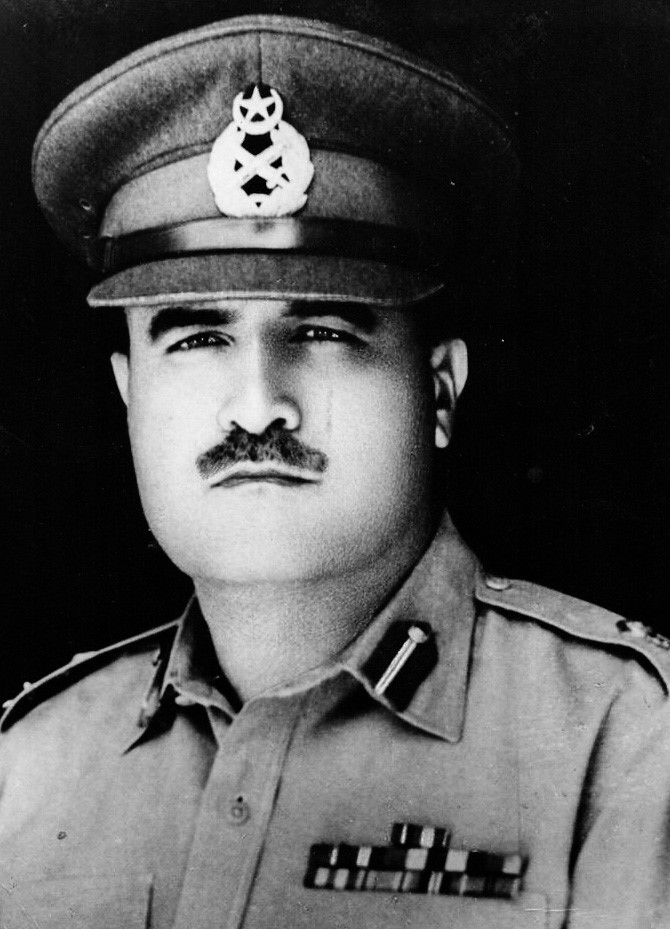
- Portrait as a Lieutenant General c. 1971

Corps Commander Lahore
- In office March 1971 – 10 January 1972
- Preceded by: Tikka Khan

7th Inspector General Frontier Corps
- In office 1964–1966

Personal details
- Born: Bahadur Sher Khan; 20 February 1922 Mardan, North-West Frontier Province, British India
- Died: 20 June 1983 (aged 61) Rawalpindi, Pakistan
- Education: Lawrence College, Ghora Gali; Indian Military Academy; Staff College, Camberley; Imperial Defence College

Military service
- Allegiance: British India; Pakistan
- Branch/service: British Indian Army (1941–1947); Pakistan Army (1947–1971)
- Years of service: 1941—1972
- Rank: Lieutenant General
- Unit: 13th Frontier Force Rifles
- Commands: IV Corps; Frontier Corps
- Battles/wars: World War II; Italian campaign; Moro River campaign; Indo-Pakistani War of 1965; Indo-Pakistani War of 1971
- Awards: Sitara-i-Pakistan; Military Cross

Bahadur Sher Khan (Note: Urdu: بہادر شیر خان) (20 February 1922 – 20 June 1983) nicknamed "One Spud Two Gravy" (Note: According to the Alumni magazine of Lawrence College, Ghora Gali: "Being a Pathan for whom Palau, Chicken Tikka, Lamb roasts and Naan ‘Kawab’ were the order of the day, his nickname came from his distaste of Ghora Gali food. He would take one look at the ‘jhits’ which passed for meat and say, "I'll have one spud and two spoons of gravy.") was a Pakistani retired lieutenant general. He commanded the IV Corps during the Indo-Pakistani war of 1971.

== Early life ==
Bahadur Sher Khan was born on 20 February 1922 in Mardan into a Pashtun family belonging to the Yusufzai tribe. His father, Subedar Major Khanezaman Khan, served in the British Indian Army during World War I.

Sher received his education at Lawrence College, Ghora Gali. He joined the British Indian Army during World War II, receiving an emergency commission in December 1941 after graduating from the Indian Military Academy. He also graduated from Staff College, Camberley.

== Personal life ==
Sher's elder half-brother, Brigadier (approved Major General) Mohammad Sher Khan, was among the early Indians commissioned from the Royal Military College, Sandhurst. He was killed in a 1949 air crash along with several other officers.

== Military career ==
=== British Indian Army ===
Sher began his career with the 6th Royal Battalion, Scinde and the 13th Frontier Force Rifles, a unit of the British Indian Army. During the Italian Campaign of World War II, he participated in operations with the 8th Indian Division. As a company commander, he led an assault across the Moro River in December 1943, earning the Military Cross for his role.

=== Pakistan Army ===
Following the partition of India in 1947, Sher continued his service in the Pakistan Army. He commanded the 7th Frontier Force Regiment (originally known as 55th Coke's Rifles) in the early 1950s and later held positions including brigade commander, commandant of the Infantry School, and inspector general of the Frontier Corps.

He held various roles in the Pakistan Army, including command of a brigade, the Infantry School in Quetta, and the Frontier Corps in Peshawar. After the 1965 Indo-Pakistani War, he commanded an infantry division. He later attended the Imperial Defence College in the United Kingdom before assuming his final appointment as a lieutenant general.

During the Indo-Pakistani War of 1971, Sher commanded the IV Corps at Lahore, where his forces captured the Hussainiwala, including Qaisar-e-Hind Fort.

On 10 January 1972, President Zulfikar Ali Bhutto retired two more Pakistani generals in his purge of the army. These were Lieutenant Generals Irshad Ahmed Khan and Bahadur Sher Khan. This brought the list to 30 total number of army and navy officers retired since 20 December 1971.

== Later life ==
Bahadur Sher later became an investor and had shares in the Khyber Tobacco Company.

== Death ==
Bahadur Sher died in 1983.

== Awards and decorations ==
Military Cross, 1944
