= Fayyaz Hussain Shah =

Pakistan military officer

Syed Fayyaz Hussain Shah HI(M)

28th Commander of IV Corps, Lahore
- Incumbent
- Assumed office 23 January 2025
- President: Asif Ali Zardari
- Prime Minister: Shehbaz Sharif
- Preceded by: Lt. General Syed Aamer Raza

Personal details
- Education: Military College Jhelum; Pakistan Military Academy
- Awards: Hilal-i-Imtiaz (Military)

Military service
- Allegiance: Pakistan
- Branch/service: Pakistan Army
- Years of service: 1989 — present
- Rank: Lieutenant General
- Unit: 4 Sindh Regiment
- Commands: Commander IV Corps, Lahore; Inspector General Trainings and Evaluation; Inspector General Arms at General Headquarters

Syed Fayyaz Hussain Shah HI(M) is a three-star general in the Pakistan Army and currently serving as the Corps Commander of IV Corps based in Lahore as of January 2025.

== Military career ==
Shah completed his education from Military College Jhelum and joined Pakistan Military Academy. He was commissioned into the Sindh Regiment through the 80th PMA Long Course.

Shah has held various commands in his career. As a major general, he served as Inspector General, Frontier Corps Balochistan (North). He also served as Dean of the National Defence University, Pakistan. He also served as Director General of Doctrine and Evaluation.

He was promoted to the rank of Lieutenant General in October 2022 and assumed the office of Inspector General Arms at GHQ. Shah then in September 2023 assumed his responsibilities as the Inspector General Training and Evaluation at GHQ, a position which oversees all the training institutes of the army.

Shah assumed the office of Corps Commander, IV Corps Lahore in January 2025.

== See also ==
- Pakistan Army
- IV Corps (Pakistan)
- List of serving generals of the Pakistan Army
