= Munir Hafiez =

Pakistani general (born 1949)

Lieutenant General Munir Hafiez
- Born: 13 March 1949 (age 77); Karachi, Sindh, Pakistan
- Military career
- Allegiance: Pakistan
- Branch: Pakistan Army
- Service years: 1969–2005
- Rank: Lieutenant General
- Nickname: Munir
- Unit: 55th Coke's Rifles (Frontier Force)
- Commands: 7th Infantry Division (Pakistan) XXXI Corps
- Conflicts: India–Pakistan war of 1971; Kargil conflict
- Other work: Former VP Zindagi Trust; Former Chairman of NAB

Munir Hafiez (born March 1949) is a retired Pakistan Army general who served as a chairman of the National Accountability Bureau (NAB). Before his appointment in 2001, he served in the Pakistani Army.

== Military career ==
Hafiez was commissioned in the 39th PMA Long Course in October 1969. He also served as GOC 7th Infantry Division at Peshawar and as Commander of XXXI Corps at Bahawalpur from August 2000 to October 2001.

== NAB chairman ==
He was replaced by Lt. Gen. Shahid Aziz after completing a controversial four-year tenure at NAB from October 2001 to October 2005.

== Later work ==
He has served as managing director and CEO of Fauji Fertilizer Company Limited. He has also served as Vice President of Zindagi Trust, a private organization.
