= Salman Fayyaz Ghanni =

Pakistani general

Salman Fayyaz Ghani

Commander IV Corps Lahore
- In office October 2022 – May 2023
- Preceded by: Lt.Gen Abdul Aziz (general)
- Succeeded by: Lt.Gen Syed Aamer Raza

Personal details
- Awards: Hilal-i-Imtiaz (Military)

Military service
- Allegiance: Pakistan
- Branch/service: Pakistan Army
- Years of service: 1989 — 2023
- Rank: Lieutenant General
- Unit: 10 Frontier Force
- Commands: Commandant School of Infantry and Tactics; General Officer Commanding 23rd Infantry Division; Inspector General Arms GHQ; Commander IV Corps Lahore

Salman Fayyaz Ghani is a retired general of the Pakistan Army. He served as the Commander of IV Corps (Lahore Corps) from October 2022 to May 2023.

== Military career ==
Ghani was commissioned in the 10th Frontier Forces via 79th PMA Long Course. He served as Commandant of the School of Infantry and Tactics in Quetta. He also served as General Officer Commanding (GOC) of the 23rd Infantry Division in Jhelum.

Ghani came in limelight after the Attack on the Corps Commander House, Lahore. Reportedly on 9 May 2023, following the arrest of former Prime Minister Imran Khan, protestors attacked and vandalized the Corps Commander’s residence in Lahore, known as Jinnah House. Ghani was immediately removed from the appointment and posted as Inspector General Arms at GHQ.

In June 2023, the Pakistan Army dismissed Ghani from service for failing to maintain order and security during the 9 May events.
