= Operation Rah-e-Nijat =

2009 military offensive by the Pakistan Armed Forces against the Tehrik-i-Taliban

- Part of the Insurgency in Khyber Pakhtunkhwa
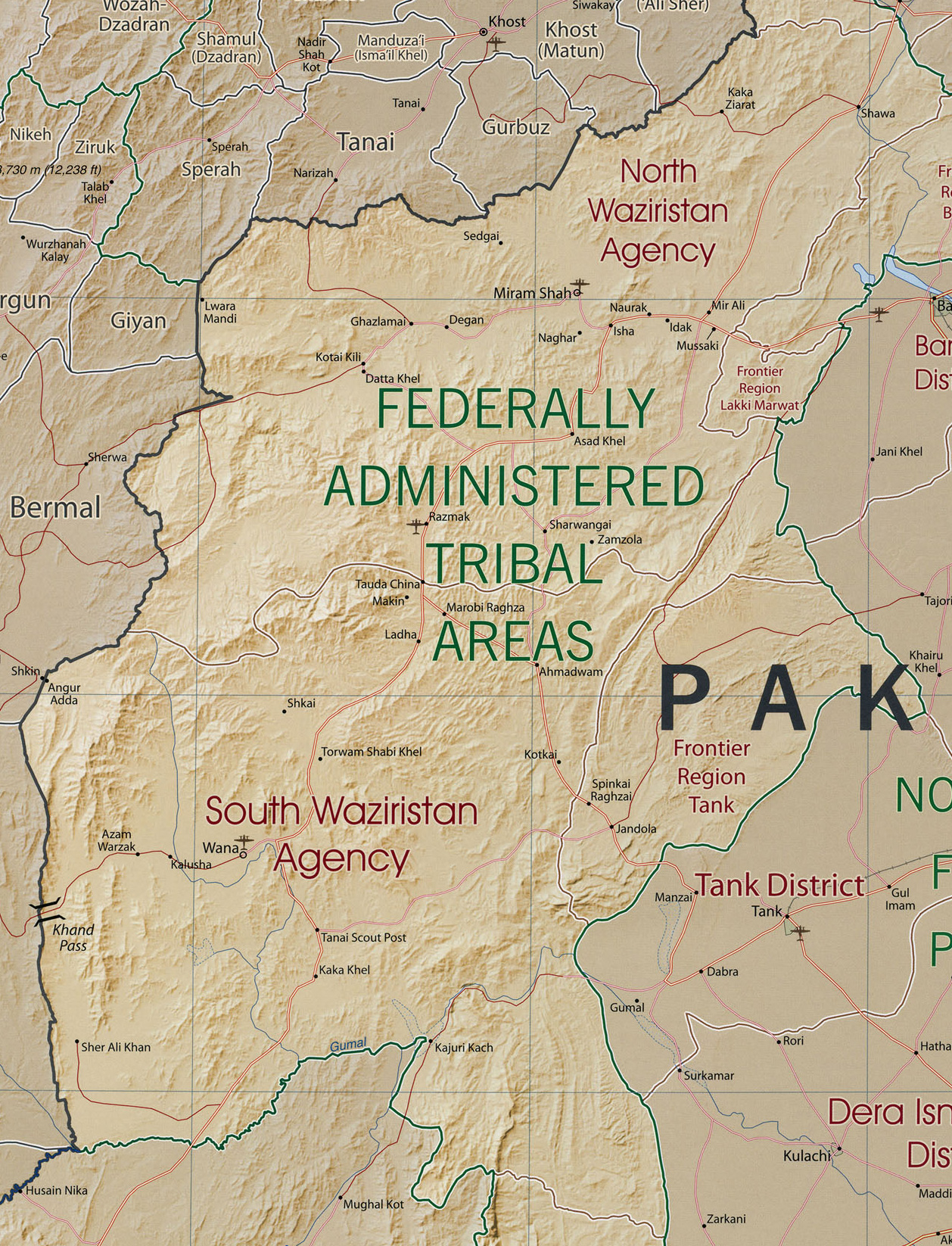
- Map of North and South Waziristan
Date	19 June – 12 December 2009 (5 months, 3 weeks and 2 days)
Location	South Waziristan, Federally Administered Tribal Areas, Pakistan
Result	Pakistani victory
Territorial changes	South Waziristan recaptured by government forces

Belligerents
Pakistan	Tehrik-i-Taliban Pakistan; Islamic Movement of Uzbekistan; Jama'at al-Jihad al-Islami (IMU splinter faction); Al-Qaeda; Foreign Mujahideen

Commanders and leaders
President Asif Ali Zardari; PM Yousaf Gillani; Gen. Ashfaq P. Kiyani; ACM Rao Q. Suleman; ADM Noman Bashir; LTG. Masood Aslam; MG Khalid Rabbani; MG Tariq Khan; MG Javed Iqbal	Baitullah Mehsud †; Tohir Abduhalilovich Yo'ldoshev †; Najmiddin Kamolitdinich Jalolov †; Waliur Rehman Mehsud †; Hakimullah Mehsud †; Noor Wali Mehsud

Units involved
Pakistan Armed Forces; Pakistan Army; XI Corps; 7th Infantry Division; 9th Infantry Division; 50th Airborne Division; Army Special Forces (SSG); Pakistan Air Force; Air Force Special Forces (SSW); No. 27th Squadron Zarrars; No. 25th Squadron Night Strike Eagles; No. 11th Squadron Arrows; Pakistan Navy; Navy Special Forces (SSG-N); Civil Armed Forces; FCKP(N); NSC	Unknown

Strength
28,000 – 45,000 troops 500 SSG Commandos	10,000 militants 1,500 foreign fighters

Casualties and losses
Approximately 83 killed, and 24 wounded (ground offensive)	800+ killed, 83 captured (ground offensive)
- 2 million civilians displaced

The Operation Rah-e-Nijat ("Path of Salvation"; Urdu: آپریشن راہ نجات) was a strategic offensive military operation by the unified command of Pakistan Armed Forces against the Tehrik-i-Taliban Pakistan (TTP) and their extremist allies in the South Waziristan area of the Federally Administered Tribal Areas that began on June 19, 2009; a major ground-air offensive was subsequently launched on October 17. It became the integral part of the war in Western fronts which led to the encirclement and destruction of Taliban forces in the region, although the Taliban leadership escaped to lawless areas of neighboring Afghanistan.

The operation was intended to finish the senior Taliban leadership and bring the lawless areas back to government control, however the leadership escaped to Afghanistan whilst areas came back under the Pakistan government control. Planning for the operation began on June 16, 2009 after successfully commencing a previous offense, the operation Rah-e-Ra'ast, and had applied a successful blockade of the region that prevented the Taliban forces from gaining external support. On October 2, 2009, the preparations for the operation were made after a top civic-military meeting took place in Islamabad which led to the revival and starting of Navy's reconnaissance and surveillance air operations to monitor the troop rotations of Taliban forces. On October 19, the ground offensive was launched when military personnel from XI Corps, along with the airborne forces who were assisted by the joint special forces, entered the area of South Waziristan, which had been subject to a three month long blockade. The Pakistan Air Force pounded the hidden and suspected mountainous regions, relying on the Navy's intelligence, while the Army marched deeper into Taliban-controlled territory. The joint-military forces entered and advanced in the region from three directions—Razmak in the north, Jandola in the east and Shakai in the west. The forces advanced into the towns of Makeen (2 serious encounter in the villages of Wachooba and Bahadar khan), Leeta Sar, Mandeech, Spinkai, Raghzai and Tiarza; initially focusing on taking the town of Kotkai which served as the command and control center for enemy combatant forces. On 24 October, the breakthrough and major achievement came when the military announced that it had successfully retaken control of the town of Kotkai after heavy fighting.

On 29 October, the military occupied the town of Kaniguram, a stronghold of former Russians fighters and Uzbeks led by the Islamic Movement of Uzbekistan. On December 12, the military announced the success of the operation and took the control of the entire South Waziristan into government control. The human cost and casualties for Taliban forces were extremely high, losing roughly a thousand fighters as compared to the military forces; the senior Taliban leadership abandoned their posts and escaped to neighboring Afghanistan before they could be apprehended or killed in the actions.

== Blockade of South Waziristan ==
On June 16, 2009, in the aftermath of the successful victory and recapture of the entire Swat valley, the Pakistan Army began a massive troop build-up along the southern and eastern borders of South Waziristan. Pakistan was now taking the fight to Tehrik-i-Taliban chief Baitullah Mehsud's mountainous stronghold, ordering an expansion of its current offensive against Taliban fighters in the Swat valley. On Sunday night, denouncing Mehsud as "the root cause of all evils," Owais Ghani, the governor of the North-West Frontier Province, said the government has called on the army to launch a "full-fledged" military operation to eliminate Mehsud and his estimated 20,000 men. The crucial battle may prove to be the most difficult that Pakistan's military has faced on its soil in recent years.

Islamabad's decision to launch the offensive against Mehsud signals a deepening of Pakistani resolve against the militants. The army has targeted the Taliban leader on three separate occasions—in 2004, 2005 and 2008—but walked away each time after signing ruinous "peace deals" that have only served to embolden Mehsud. But the military appears more determined this time. It also enjoys the backing of the general citizenry as public support of the military has increased dramatically as the recent wave of terrorist attacks has heightened revulsion against the Taliban.

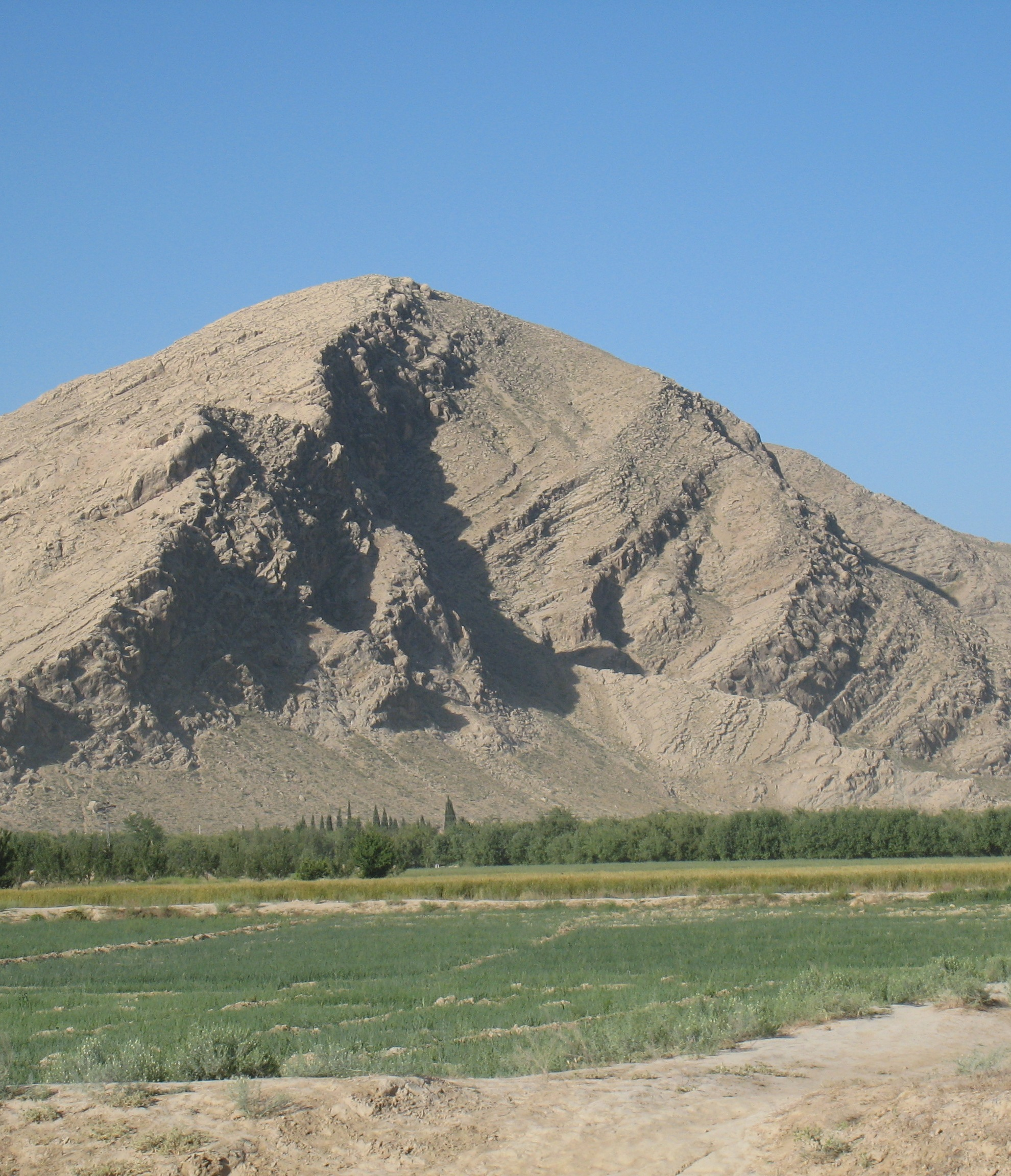
The Pakistan Armed Forces fought the war in open green plains and dry high mountains.

By June 21, 2009, at least 46 militants were killed in the South Waziristan tribal region and the Malakand division. Six soldiers, including an Army officer, were killed and 17 soldiers injured in fighting in the Malakand and South Waziristan Agency within a 24-hour period. Another six militants were apprehended, the military said. These were the first known casualties among Baitullah Mehsud's fighters in a new offensive in South Waziristan, where al-Qaeda chief Osama bin Laden and his other top commanders and Taliban leaders were believed to be holed up. On June 28, eight militants were killed in Swat and 10 in Waziristan, in operations that destroyed the militants' command network and led to the seizure of "a huge amount" of arms and ammunition, army spokesman Major General Athar Abbas told reporters. Sixteen soldiers were killed in action, twelve of them dying near the Afghan border in the North Waziristan tribal area when their convoy was ambushed. Several vehicles were hit in the ambush and another 10 soldiers were seriously wounded.

On June 30, militants ambushed a Pakistani military convoy near the Afghan border, killing a further 12 Pakistani soldiers. Several vehicles were hit and the military said 12 soldiers were killed and 10 seriously wounded. On July 3, a military transport helicopter of the Pakistan Army went down and crashed on the border between Khyber and Orakzai tribal region on Friday afternoon, killing all 26 soldiers on board. The helicopter crashed because of a technical fault. On August 5, the CIA carried out a drone strike on Baitullah Mehsud and his family. Mehsud was killed, along with his father-in-law and his wife. The operation in South Waziristan was already in planning process. Two divisions of military were deployed and negotiations with the tribes and minor groups of militants were being conducted to isolate the enemy.

== Second phase ==
=== Preparations ===
After a three-month blockade of South Waziristan and intermittent skirmishes with militants, the Pakistani military announced on October 2, 2009, that it would begin a large-scale operation to wipe out Taliban and Al Qaeda militants in the area. Pakistani officials characterized the impending clash as "the mother of all battles." Prior to the launch of the operation, the Pakistani Army had reinforced their presence on the borders of South Waziristan to two divisions (20,000–30,000 troops) who were facing a heavily entrenched force of 6,000–7,000 militants, including Taliban-allied Mehsud tribesmen as well as Uzbek and Arab foreign fighters affiliated with Al Qaeda.

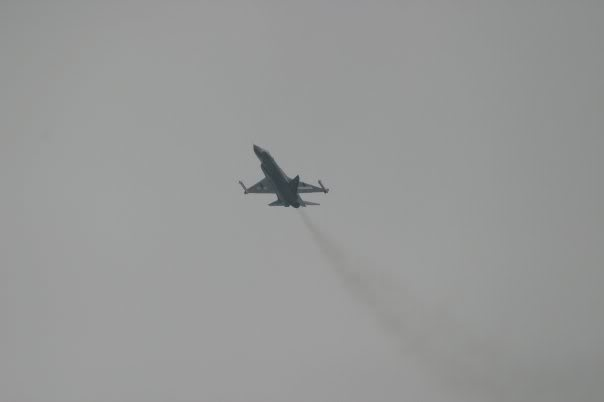
During the conflict, the JF-17 was deployed for the first time after their induction into the Pakistan Air Force.

A meeting, which was attended by the top civilian and military leadership, gave the go-ahead to launch a military operation in South Waziristan to eliminate terrorism and extremism on October 16. Members attending included Awami National Party's Asfandyar Wali Khan, PML-N's Mian Shahbaz Sharif, Muttahida Qaumi Movement's Dr Farooq Sattar, Balochistan National Party-A's Senator Israrullah Zehri, Aftab Ahmad Sherpao of the Pakistan People's Party-S, Munir Khan Orakzai from the Federally Administered Tribal Areas, Raza Rabbani of the Parliamentary Committee on National Security, Pir Sadruddin Shah of the PML-F, Maulana Mohammad Khan Sherani of the Jamiat Ulema-i-Islam (Fazl), Defence Minister Ahmad Mukhtar, Finance Minister Shaukat Tarin, Foreign Minister Shah Mehmood Qureshi, Minister for Information and Broadcasting Qamar Zaman Kaira, NWFP Governor Owais Ahmed Ghani and Chief Minister Ameer Haider Khan Hoti, the chief of the Intelligence Bureau. One report indicated that the offensive had a two-month timetable.

=== Ground offensive ===
The Pakistan Army started the campaign with 28,000 infantry and Airborne troops entering South Waziristan against the Taliban on October 17. Forces involved included the American trained Pakistan Army's 50th Airborne Division, 7th and 9th Infantry Divisions of XI Corps (Pakistan), which is the controlling headquarters, and 40th Infantry Division of Army Reserve Centre. (orbat.com, accessed 24 October 2009) The Pakistani Army advanced across South Waziristan from three directions—Razmak in the north, Jandola in the east and Shakai in the west. The Pakistani forces were reported to be moving towards the towns of Makeen, Spinkai, Raghzai and Tiarza. PAF's fighter aircraft, notably F-16 and JF-17, flown by the members of SSW's 4th SOS Squadron, heavily bombed the area, in order to soften militant hideouts. The invasion was timed before winter weather caused snow to block roads, but so that when winter arrived, the cold weather would force Taliban from their hideouts. The Taliban forces, led by new leader Hakimullah Mehsud, are estimated to be between 10,000–20,000 along with 500–5,000 Uzbek supporters. In the midnight of October 17, the troops of 50th Airborne Division began to parachuted along with the members of PN SEALs Team 8th of SSG(N), 9th Wing Company of Army Rangers, and the 10th Special Forces Battalion of Pakistan Army. The Pakistan army, totaling 28,000, are likely to receive support from paramilitary groups in tribal areas of South Waziristan. Dozens of casualties on both sides were reported to have been inflicted as fierce fighting commenced. Casualties are expected to increase as the military move deeper into Taliban territory. Civilians of South Waziristan attempting to leave had difficulty as the military blocked the roads, which were used to transport arms and ammunition to troops. People of the area are migrating to the main town of Peshawar. The communication network was severely affected.

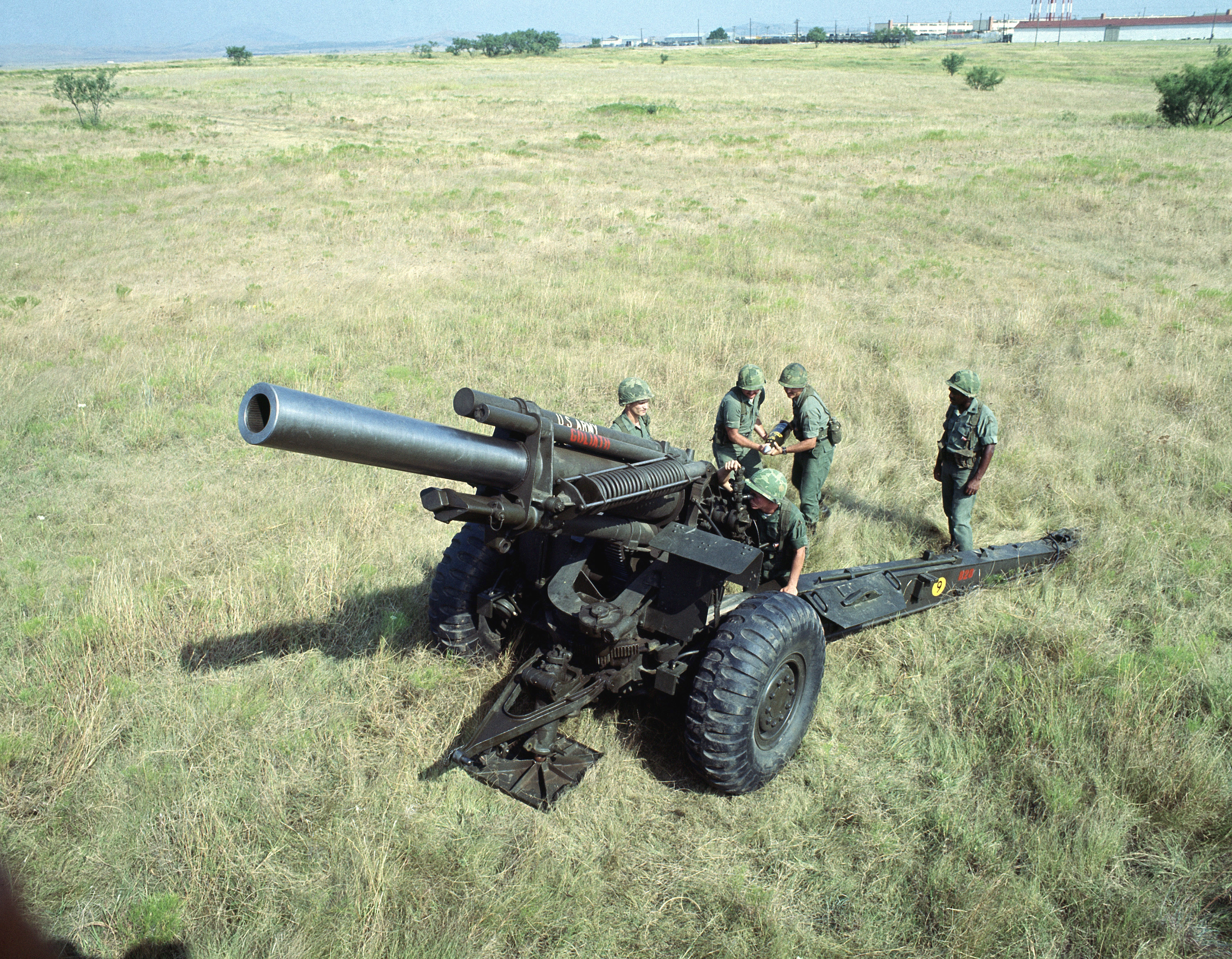
M114 howitzer from the Pakistan Army Artillery Corps played pivotal role by giving dominance to the Pakistan Army's ground troops against terrorists occupying high altitude.

The Pakistan Air Force's SSW 4th SOS Squadron used attack helicopters and fighter jets to force the Taliban into the mountains when they put up resistance. Up to 100,000 civilians have left the conflict area. On October 20 it was reported that, three weeks prior, the Pakistani government had cut deals with the anti-American militants led by former Taliban commanders Maulvi Nazir and Hafiz Gul Bahadur. This deal was expected to help the operation succeed, and was not opposed by U.S. officials. The US killed 27 people in a drone strike in Bajaur on October 24.

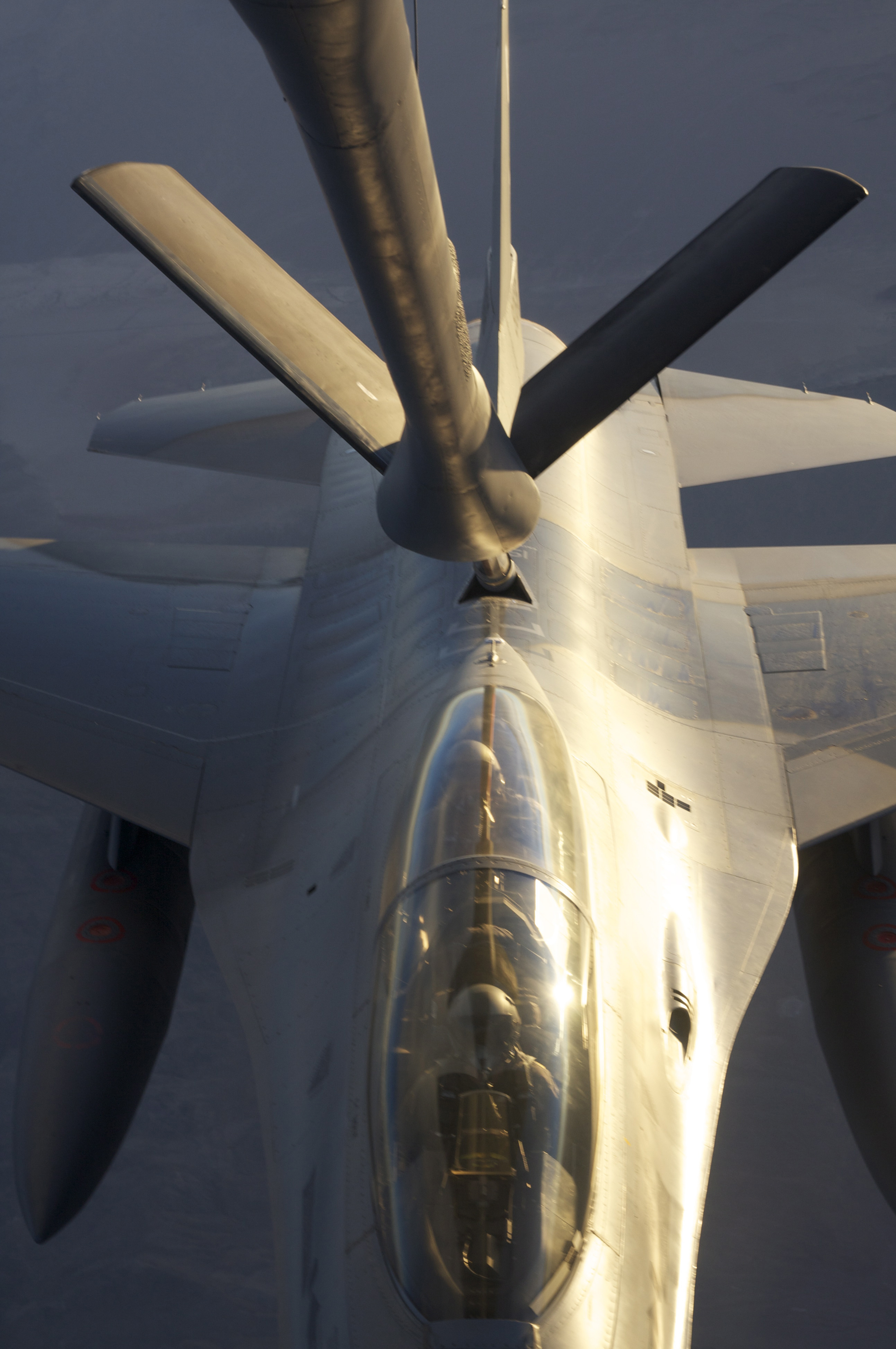
PAF F-16s were also committed to the fighting.

On October 24, Pakistani officials announced that Airborne troops, backed up by artillery, helicopters and fighter jets, had gained control of the town of Kotkai, a key breakthrough in the offensive. Kotkai was home to the Taliban leader, Hakimullah Mehsud and it had experienced fierce fighting between both sides since the ground offensive started. Earlier that week, Pakistani forces took control of the town briefly, but the Taliban regained it.

On October 29, news agencies were told that the Pakistan army had surrounded the town of Kaniguram, a stronghold of Uzbek fighters. The army reported that, since the operation began on October 17, 264 Taliban militants had been killed and 33 Pakistani soldiers had been killed in action. On November 2, the Pakistani Army took control of Kaniguram, a key Taliban regional stronghold and a stronghold of Uzbek militants, led by the hardline Islamic Movement of Uzbekistan. By November 17, the Pakistani Army took control of most of the towns in South Waziristan such as Sararogha.

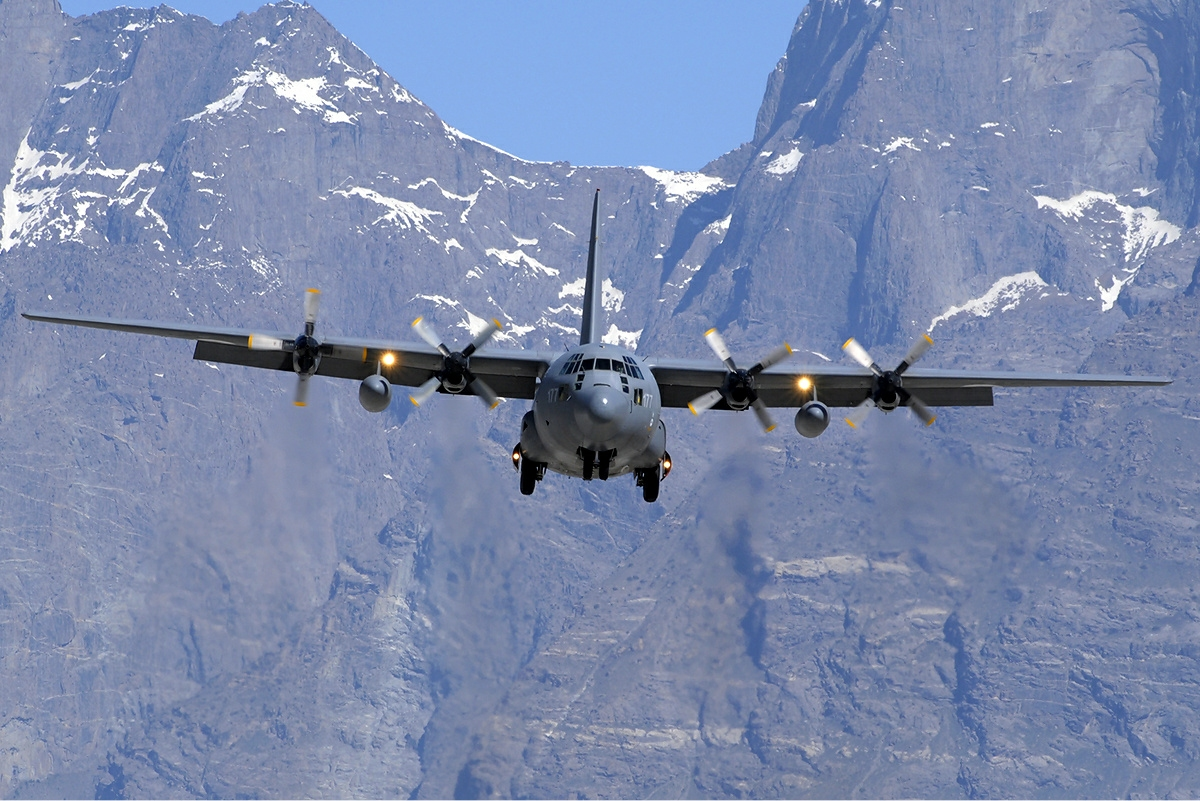
Airborne paratroopers were parachuted from C-130s during the conflict.

By December 12, the operation was over and the Army retook the whole of South Waziristan. However, none of the top Taliban leaders were killed or captured in the operation. The government's next aim was the Orakzai region where most of the Taliban forces retreated.

594 Taliban militants and 80 Pakistani soldiers were killed during the ground offensive. Another 243 soldiers were wounded and 83 militants were captured.

In clashes in Makeen on July 10, 2010, twenty-five Taliban and three Pakistani soldiers were killed.

== Refugees ==
According to the official Inter-Services Public Relations (ISPR) press release, dated October 20, 2009, 11,080 families (80,000 individuals) were registered to be internally displaced from South Waziristan to Internally Displaced Persons (IDP) camps in Tank District and Dera Ismail Khan District before the start of the operation on October 17, while a total of 4,477 families (41,289 individuals) were registered after the military onslaught. Repatriation of IDPs to South Waziristan began in 2012, following protests by IDPs in Islamabad.

== Peace prospects ==
The rationale of Operation Rah-e-Nijat has been criticized by many intellectuals, however, this was among the options available for Pakistan. It is hoped from the claims of Army that soon militant basis will be uprooted and peace will be restored. Peace prospects depend on several factors. Among which, regional approach is sine qua non to eliminate terrorists as Pakistan claims no monopoly over the industry of terror. Terrorist elements are not confined to Pakistan alone, and are allegedly active in the entire region.

== See also ==
- Operation Rah-e-Rast
- Operation Zarb-e-Azb
- Operation Black Thunderstorm
- War in North-West Pakistan
- Tehreek-i-Taliban Pakistan
- Fazlullah
- 2009 Pakistan Army Mil Mi-17 crash
