= Majid Ehsan =

Pakistan Army retired general

Lieutenant General Majid Ehsan HI(M)
- Education: Pakistan Command & Staff College; Command and Staff College, Cairo
- Military career
- Allegiance: Pakistan
- Branch: Pakistan Army
- Service years: 1986–2021
- Rank: Lieutenant General
- Unit: Punjab Regiment
- Commands: Colonel Commandant Punjab Regiment; IG Arms GHQ; Commander IV Corps; Vice Chief of General Staff; DG Military Operations; President National Defence University
- Awards: Hilal-e-Imtiaz (Military)

Majid Ehsan is a retired three-star rank Pakistan Army general who has served as Inspector General Arms at General Army Headquarters in Rawalpindi. He was appointed to the post of colonel commandant of the Punjab Regiment in July 2021. He previously served as Vice Chief of General Staff and President of the National Defence University, he was appointed as Corp Commander IV Corps in December 2018 until December 2020.

== Career ==
He was commissioned in the Pakistan Army in 1986 with his first assignment at the Punjab Regiment. He graduated from the Command and Staff College, and later went to Cairo, Egypt where he received his military training from the Command & Staff College. He obtained his military education from the National Defence University, Islamabad.

His staff and instructional assignments includes Platoon Commander at the Pakistan Military Academy, general staff officer-II and General Staff Officer-I at directorate of military operations. His previous assignments include Colonel General Staff and Brigade Commander and Commander IV Corps, in addition to serving as a commanding officer at School of Infantry and Tactics, and Commander of Infantry Division until he was appointed as Vice Chief of General Staff.

He retired on 18 October 2021.
