= Military Secretary (Pakistan) =

Administrative post in Pakistan

- Pakistan Army
- Type: Military office management
- Member of: Cabinet
- Reports to: Prime Minister of Pakistan; President of Pakistan (Note: the Military Secretary to the Prime Minister of Pakistan reports to prime minister's office, while the Military Secretary to the President of Pakistan reports to the president.)
- Residence: Prime Minister's Office; Aiwan-e-Sadr (Note: the residence of secretary to prime minister is PM's office, while the residence of secretary to president is Aiwan-e-Sadr, the workplace of the president.)
- Appointer: Prime Minister; President (Note: secretary to president is appointed by the president, while secretary to prime minister is appointed by the prime minister itself.)
- Term length: 3 years

The Military Secretary (MS) is an administrative post in the federal government of Pakistan tasked with appointment, posting and other military administrative privileges given by the government. In Pakistan's political system, a military secretary to the prime minister of Pakistan is held by a military personnel with a rank of brigadier, while military secretary to the president of Pakistan is usually held by a military officer with lieutenant colonel or equivalent rank. Military Secretary is entitled to assist the office with correspondence in staff. Since the office is literary held by an aide-de-camp (ADC), a MS does not execute promotions and appointments of military officers independently.

In the Pakistan Army, a deputy military secretary is appointed to the general headquarters assigned with career management privileges of low ranking officers such as major, captain or equivalent.

== List of secretaries ==
=== Secretaries to prime minister ===
| Year | Name | Prime Minister | Ref(s) |
|---|---|---|---|
| 2014-2017 | Brigadier Akmal Aziz | Nawaz Sharif | |
| 2017-2020 | Brig (Now Maj Gen) Waseem Iftikhar Cheema | Shahid Khaqan Abbasi; Imran Khan | |
| 2020-2022 | Brigadier Mohammad Ahmed | Imran Khan; Shehbaz Sharif | |
| 2022–Present | Major General Tajdeed Mumtaz | Shehbaz Sharif | |

=== Secretaries to president ===
| Year | Name | President | Ref(s) |
|---|---|---|---|
| 2002-2003 | Major General Nadeem Taj | Pervez Musharraf | |
| 2003-2005 | Major General (Later Lt Gen)Shafaat Ullah Shah | Pervez Musharraf | |
| 2008-2011 | Brigadier (Later Lt Gen) Syed Muhammad Adnan | Asif Ali Zardari | |
| 2011-2013 | Brig (Later Lt Gen) Muhammad Aamer | Asif Ali Zardari | |
| 2013-2015 | Brig (Now Maj Gen) Adnan Sarwar Malik | Mamnoon Hussain | |
| 2015-2017 | Brig (Later Maj Gen) Shahid Nazir | Mamnoon Hussain | |
| 2017-2018 | Brig (Now Maj Gen) Abdul Moeed | Mamnoon Hussain | |
| 2018-2021 | Brig (Now Maj Gen) Amir Amin | Dr. Arif Alvi | |
| 2021-2024 | Brig ( Now Maj General) Sheharyar Munir Hafeez | Dr. Arif Alvi | |
| 2025-current | Brig (Now Maj General) Sajid Akbar | Asif Zardari | |

== See also ==
- Military Secretary to the India Office
- Military Secretary (India)
- Military Secretary (United Kingdom)
