= Regiment of Artillery (Pakistan) =

Pakistan Army's staff corps for artillery warfare

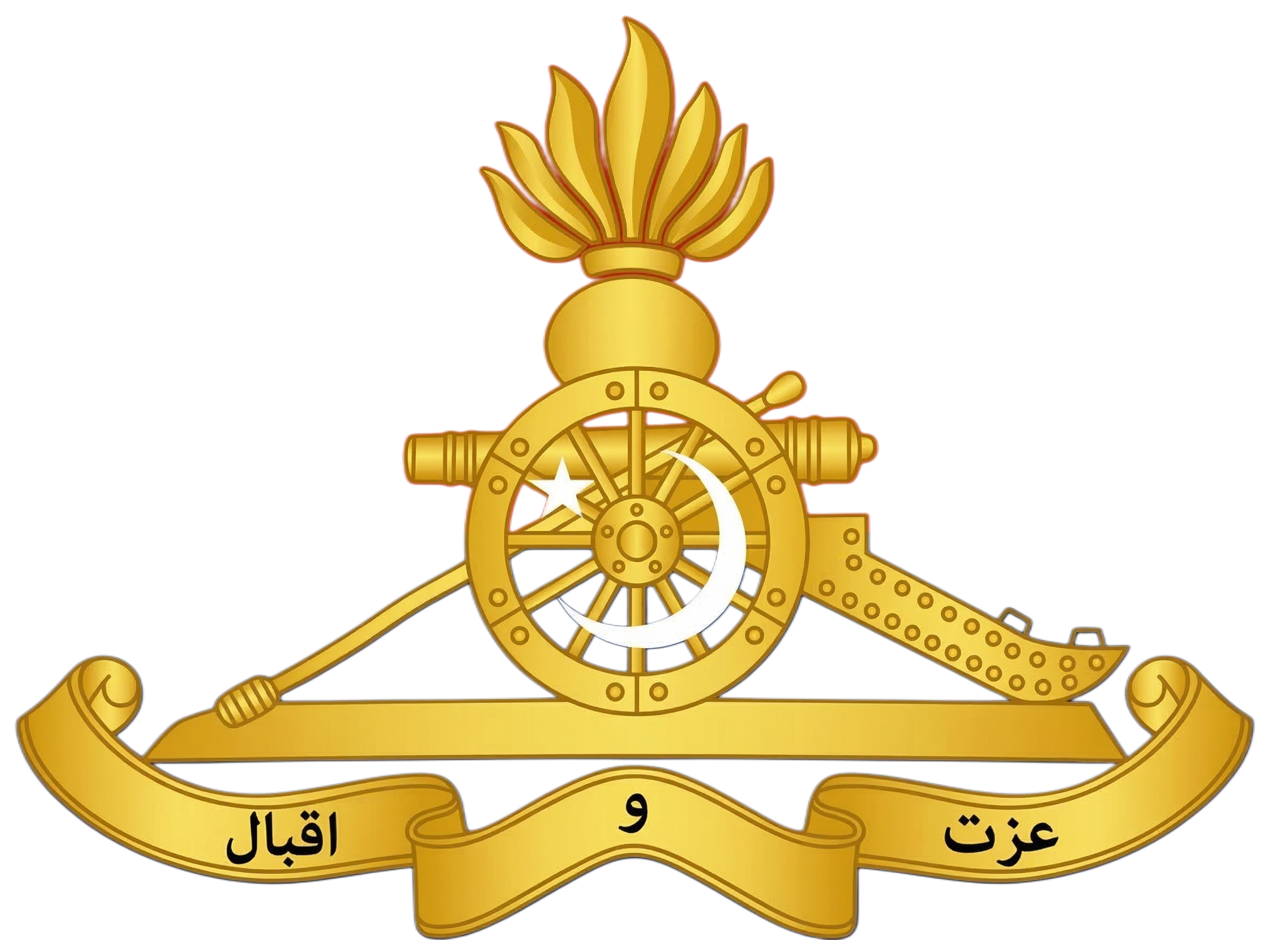
- Insignia of the Regiment of Artillery
- Active: 1947; 79 years ago
- Country: Pakistan
- Branch: Pakistan Army
- Type: Combat service support
- Role: Administrative and staffing oversight.
- Size: 45 battalion-sized Regiments
- HQ/Garrison: Army GHQ in Chaklala Cantonment, Rawalpindi District, Punjab, Pakistan
- Nickname: ARTY
- Mottos: عزت و اقبال "Honor and Glory"
- Colors: Red and Blue
- Engagements: Military history of Pakistan

Commanders
- Director-General: Maj-Gen. Amir Naveed Warraich
- Notable commanders: Gen. Pervez Musharraf; Gen. Tikka Khan; Gen. Sawar Khan; Gen. Zubair Hayat; Lt-Gen. S.M. Abbasi; Lt-Gen. Asif Ghafoor

Insignia
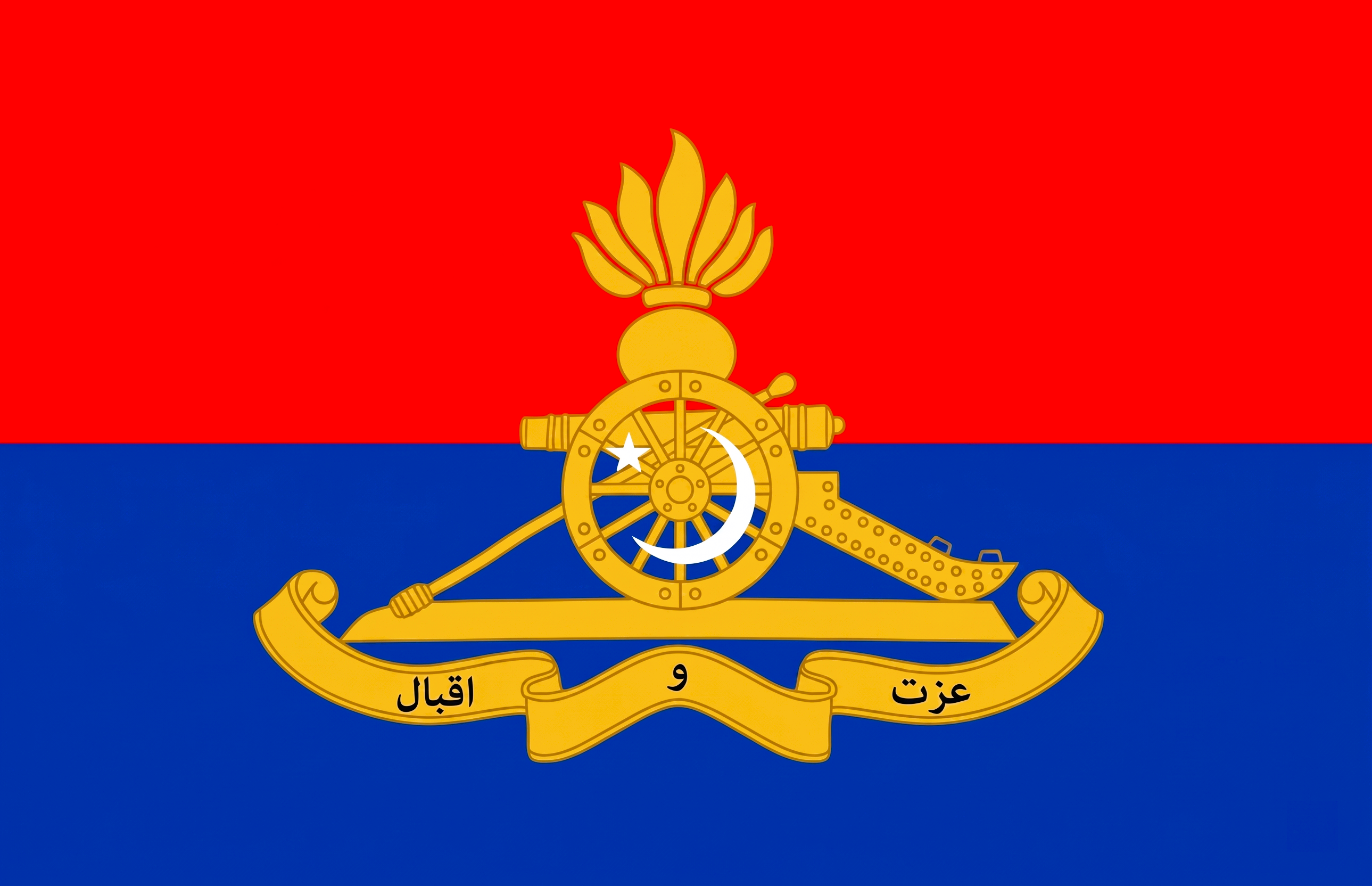
- Flag

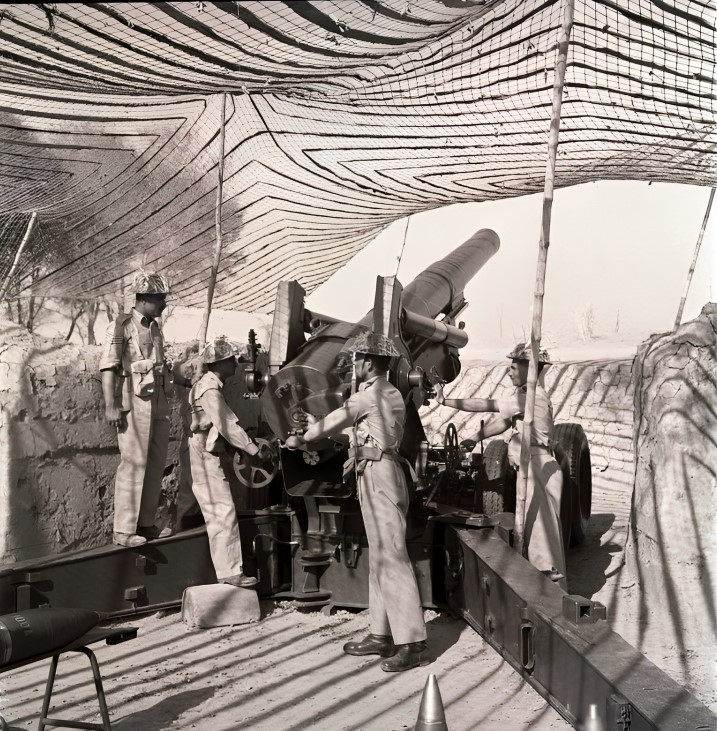
The Pakistan Army's troops operating the M115 howitzer in 1965.

The Corps of Artillery is a Combat arm of the Pakistan Army and provide Artillery support to the army, ranging from mortars, field guns to guided rockets and long range ballistic and cruise missiles

The corps is generally organised with many of its units deployed as part of artillery brigades integral to all Corps and Dvisions, in addition to artillery divisions reporting direct to the General Headquarters, including strategeic forces.

== History ==
After partition of former British Indian Army, the Royal Indian Artillery was split between the Indian Army and the Pakistan Army, which Pakistan renamed it as "Royal Pakistan Artillery" in 1947. In 1947, the Regiment inherited only eight regiments, one survey battery, an air observation post flight, and two formation headquarters.

From 1947 to 1956, the Pakistan Army needed to retain some British officers, mostly in training, senior staff and command positions and specialist roles, while Pakistani officers gained experience and were promoted, replacing British officers, and to maintain administrative support of the Royal Pakistan Artillery.

In 1956, with the proclamation of the Republic, the artillery was reorganized as Corps of Artillery (Royal title was dropped) with the field manuals being adopted from the United States Army's Field Artillery Branch through U.S. aid which allowed the army to be aligned on American training patterns. The regiments within the Corps of Artillery in the old structure were equipped with 24 guns held in three batteries, further divided into two troops of four guns each. The Pakistan Army adopted the U.S. Army system of 18 guns in each regiment, divided in three batteries of six guns each in 1956.

The Corps of Artillery is considered the most prestigious arm of the Pakistan Army. The education and training for the troops to be part of the Regiment of Artillery is offered by the School of Artillery which was established by the Pakistan Army in 1947 at Nowshera Cantonment. The Regiment of Artillery is commanded by the active-duty two-star, major-general, who serves its director-general, working directly under the Chief of the General Staff (CGS) at the Army GHQ in Rawalpindi, Punjab in Pakistan.

== Units ==
- The First (SP) Medium Regiment (FF) (Pur Azam Bawaqar)
- 2 Field (Chamb Di Rani)
- 3 (SP) (Bijli Topkhana)
- 4 Medium (Fighting Four)
- 5 MLRS (Al Shurraz)
- 6 MLRS (The Grid Smashers)
- 7 Mountain (Gola Of Babot)
- 8 Medium (Eight The Great)
- 9 Medium (Ghazian E Chajja)
- 109 Medium (Heavy Haavy) (Earth Tremblers)(FAL MUGHEERAT)
- 10 Medium (The Tenicious) (Sharp & Deadly)
- 11 Medium (Chamb Ikatar) (Gyara Josh Ka Dhara)
- 12 Medium (Raad Un Wa Barq) (Zafarwal Medium)
- 13 MBRL
- 14 Field (ABBASIA)
- 15 (SP) (The Star Regt) (Fighting Fifteen)
- 16 (SP) (The Dashing Sixteen)
- 17 Locating (Aik Sath)
- 18 (SP) Field (Khush Bash Athara)
- 19 MBRL (Atish o Ahan)
- 20 MBRL (Zarb E Shadeed)
- 21 Medium (Punjab) (Gajj K Wajj)
- 22 Field (Gram Dam E Justuju)
- 23 (SP) Field (Guns Of Wagah)
- 24 Medium (Zarb Ul Awwal)
- 25 Field (Leepa Pioneers)
- 26 Field (Vanguards of Rah E Raast)
- 27 Medium (Lipa Ghazi)
- 28 Medium (But Shikan)
- 29 Field (Al-Qafiz Regiment)
- 30 (SP) Heavy Regiment (Zilzaal)
- 31 Mountain (The Only One)
- 32 Medium (September Maroons)
- 33 (SP) Heavy (Janfishan)
- 34 Medium (Happy Heavy Artillery Power Punch)
- 35 (SP) Heavy (Sherni)
- 36 LAA (Transferred to Army Air Defence in 1991)
- 37 Locating (Proud Locators) (First To Locate)
- 38 Field (Kargil Topkhana)
- 39 (SP) (Discipline, Efficiency, Teamwork) (Har Dum Pur Dum) (Chamb 65-71)
- 40 Field (Taigh E Burran)
- 42 Field (The Flaming Blue)
- 43 LAA (Transferred to Army Air Defence in 1991)
- 44 (SP) (Men of Crisis)
- 45 Field
- 46 Field (Golandaz)
- 47 Field (Heaven of Heavens)
- 48 Field (The Hard Hitters)
- 49 Field (Zarb Ul Hai)
- 50 Field (Al Haamiyah)
- 51 Medium (Mandiala Gunners) (Tatla's Own)
- 52 Medium
- 53 Field (Tarwanja Sheer Da Panja)
- 54 Medium (Zarb E Haider) (Mty Bhatti's Own)
- 55 Field (Pachwanja, Jessore Khulna, Sada Panja Dada Panja)
- 56 Field (An Nasir)
- 57 Medium (Fakhar E Jassar)
- 59 Field (Five Nine The Very Fine) (Changazi's Own)
- 60 Medium (Hizb Ul Hadeed) (Sialkot 71, Kargil 99, OAM 16)
- 61 (SP) (Ek Sath)
- 62 Field
- 63 Medium (Nothing But The Best)
- 64 Medium (Victors Of Chamb)
- 65 Medium (Pensath) (Ready & Alive)
- 66 Medium (Tabah Kun)
- 67 (SP) LAA (Transferred to Army Air Defence in 1991)
- 68 Mountain (Daruchain 71)
- 69 Medium (Hum Nasir) (Bravo 69)
- 70 Field (Ghazi E Kanganpur)
- 71 Field (Saf Shikan)
- 72 (SP) Medium (Behter) (Shakargarh Medium 71) (The Shakargarh SP) (Flag Bearers)
- 73 Medium
- 74 LAA (Transferred to Army Air Defence in 1991)
- 75 LAA (Transferred to Army Air Defence in 1991)
- 76 Field (July Jolt) (Sabuna 71)
- 77 Field (Sath Sath) (Facta Non Verba)
- 78 Field (Al Qariah)
- 79 Field (Fauq Ul Ahsan)
- 80 Field (Ghazi E Hilli)
- 81 Medium (Jannat Talwaron K Saye Talay)
- 82 (SP) (The Kargil Hunters) (HAQ HOO) (Bobby's Own)
- 83 Medium (On Target)
- 84 Field (Pasban E Hurriat)
- 85 Medium (Al Saiqa) (Chhor 71)
- 86 Field (Seena Sipar)
- 87 (SP) Medium (1971) (The Aala Regt)
- 89 LAA (Transferred to Army Air Defence in 1991)
- 90 Medium (Pur Azam Ba Hadaf) (Kamra Saviours)
- 91 Field (Mighty One)
- 92 Mountain (Muhammadia)
- 93 Medium (The Shaheen Regt)
- 94 LAA (Transferred to Army Air Defence in 1991)
- 96 Missile Regiment (Shaheen Ba Hadaf)
- 97 LAA (Transferred to Army Air Defence in 1991)
- 98 LAA (Transferred to Army Air Defence in 1991)
- 99 Medium (Taholi Shine)
- 101 Field Mountain (NLI) (The Kargil Field) (The Century First) (Sherdill Ababeel Sabit Qadam)
- 104 LAA (Transferred to Army Air Defence in 1991)
- 105 Field (Al Shadeed)
- 105 Locating
- 106 Medium (The Century Six)
- 107 Mountain (Siachen Awwaleen)
- 110 Field (Ek Do Das Zabardast)
- 115 Medium (Ek Pandran)
- 117 Medium (Zarb Ul Hadeed)
- 118 Medium (Al Ghalib IllAllah) (Lashkara)
- 119–127 Artillery Units
- 128 Field (Har Waqt Bar Waqt)
- 129 Field (Fit n Fine) (Deedban E Kargil)
- 130 Medium (Zarb E Ajal)
- 131 (SP) (Al Mujazif)
- 132 Medium (Har Dum Pur Dam)
- 137 Medium (Highway To Heaven)
- 138 (SP) (Zinda Dill)
- 139 (SP)
- 140 (SP) (Dast E Ajal)
- 149 Medium (Sholah Fishan)
- 150 Medium (Ek Panjah)
- 151 Medium (Al Saddad)
- 152 Medium (Al Sadat)
- 153 Medium (Mudafe ul Harmain)
- 154 (SP) (Ek Churwanja) (Sher Da Punja)
- 155 Missile Regiment (The Pioneers)
- 156 Locating (The Striking Locators)
- 157 Locating
- 158 Locating (The Great)
- 159 Locating (Vigilant Tracker)
- 160 Field
- 161 Field (Second To None)
- 162 Field (Mountain Hawks)
- 163 Field (Zarb Ul Mateen)
- 164 Field (Steel & Fire)
- 165 Field (Marala)
- 166 Medium (Zarb E Ahan)
- 168 Field (Proud & Great)
- 169 (SP) (Waseleen E Hadaf)
- 170 Field
- 171 Field (As Sawaiq)
- 172 MLRS
- 172 MBRL
- 173 (SP) Medium (Al Takbeer)
- 174 Medium (Ek Saath Chaar)
- 175 Missile Regiment (First To Fire) (Shandar Regt)
- 176 Missile Regiment
- 177 Missile Regiment
- 178–179 Artillery Units
- 180 MLRS (First To Fire Shaheen 2)
- 181 MRA (The Cruise Pioneer) (Shahab E Saqib Regt)
- 182 Artillery Unit
- 183 NLI Medium (Bombrash)
- 184 (SP) Medium (Sholah Jawan)
- 185 Field (Fakhar E Margalla)
- 186 Mountain (Barq O Raad)
- 189 Missile Regiment
- 193 Missile Regiment
- 194 Mountain Regiment (Artillery)
- 195 Mountain Regiment (Artillery)
- 196 Mountain Regiment (Artillery)
- 197 Missile Regiment (The Deterrent)
- 198 Missile Regiment
- 199 Missile Regiment (Hizbullah)
- 200 Medium
- 830 MJD Field
- 831 MJD Field (Chamb Tigers)
- 832 MJD Field
- 833 MJD Medium (Takbeeries)
- 836 MJD Medium

Key

- Field = Field Regiment Artillery
- Medium = Medium Regiment Artillery
- SP = Self Propelled Regiment Artillery
- MBRL = Multi Barrel Rocket Launcher Regiment Artillery
- MLRS = Multiple Launch Rocket System Regiment Artillery
- Missile Regt = Missile Regiment Artillery
- Mountain = Mountain Regiment Artillery
- Locating = Locating Regiment Artillery
- MJD = Mujahid Regiment Artillery
