= Chief of the General Staff (Pakistan) =

Head of the Pakistan Army GHQ staff

Chief of General Staff
- چیف آف جنرل اسٹاف
- Flag of the Pakistan Army
- Incumbent; Lieutenant General Omer Ahmed Bokhari
- Pakistan Army
- Type: Principal Staff Officer
- Abbreviation: CGS
- Reports to: C-in-C (1947-72); COAS (since 1972)
- Seat: GHQ (Pakistan Army)
- Appointer: COAS
- Formation: 1947; 79 years ago
- First holder: Major General Reginald Antony Hutton

The Chief of General Staff (abbreviated as CGS) is the most coveted position within the Pakistan Army after that of the Chief of the Army Staff (COAS). Although the COAS is the head of the land forces, the CGS is "the organizational lead on both intelligence and operations", hence being in charge of the Military Intelligence (MI) and Military Operations (MO) Directorates. Since 1985, a three-star rank Lt. Gen. is appointed to the post.

== History ==
The criteria for the positions of Chief of the Army Staff (COAS) and Chairman Joint Chiefs of Staff Committee (CJCSC) have a preference that the officer should have served as the Chief of General Staff. Of the last 13 four-star rank army generals, eight officers have served as the CGS. Of the five who had not, Pervez Musharraf and Ashfaq Parvez Kayani had served as Director General of Military Operations (DGMO), while Ehsan ul Haq had served as Director General of Military Intelligence (DGMI), all two-star postings under the CGS.

Historically, the Chief of General Staff, in addition to Commander X Corps have political significance when the army chief wanted to overthrow political leadership. The 1999 Pakistani coup d'état, which brought General Pervez Musharraf to power had active involvement of Lt Gen Aziz Khan, then CGS and Lt Gen Mahmud Ahmed, commander of the X Corps.

Therefore, the army chief essentially appoints his most trusted aides for these two postings before making a routine reshuffle. General Ziauddin Butt, who was nominated by Prime Minister Nawaz Sharif after retiring Pervez Musharraf, passed his first orders to appoint Lt Gen Muhammad Akram as CGS and Lt Gen Salim Haider as commander X Corps. But before this order could be conveyed to the rest of the army, Aziz and Mahmud took steps to reverse the order by overthrowing the government and thus essentially starting the 1999 coup.

== List of Chiefs of General Staff ==
#	Portrait	Name	Start of term	End of term	Unit of Commission
1		Major General Reginald Antony Hutton	1947	1951	2nd Gurkha Rifles
2		Major General Akbar Khan; DSO	1951	1951	6/13 Frontier Force Rifles (1 FF)
3		Major General Mohammad Yusuf Khan	26 March 1951	1953	
4		Major General Mian Hayaud Din; HJ MBE MC	1953	1955	4/12 Frontier Force Regiment (6FF)
5		Major General Sher Ali Khan Pataudi; HJ	1955	December 1956	7th Light Cavalry
6		Major General Habibullah Khan Khattak; SPk LOM	24 January 1957	July 1957	12 Baluch Regiment
7		Major General Yahya Khan	25 July 1957	23 December 1962	3rd Battalion (Queen Mary's Own, 10th Baluch Regiment (10 Baluch)
8		Major General Malik Sher Bahadur	24 December 1962	17 April 1966	4th Battalion (Duke of Connaught's Own) The Baluch Regiment (11 Baluch)
9		Major General Sahabzada Yaqub Khan; SPk	18 April 1966	19 December 1968	18th King Edward's Own Cavalry
10		Major General Gul Hassan Khan; SQA SPk	20 December 1968	19 December 1971	5th Horse (Probyn's Horse)
11		Major General M. Rahim Khan	1972	1974	
12		Major General Iqbal Khan; NI(M) SI(M) SBt	July 1974	March 1976	5th Battalion (Queen Victoria's Own Corps of Guides) 12 Frontier Force Regiment (2 FF)
13		Major General Abdullah Malik	March 1976	March 1978	4 Punjab Regiment
14		Major General F. S. Lodhi	March 1978	June 1980	East Bengal Regiment
15		Major General Mirza Aslam Beg; NI(M) SI(M) SBt	June 1980	October 1985	16 Baloch Regiment
16		Lieutenant General Muhammad Safdar	October 1987	January 1988	7 Punjab Regiment
17		Lieutenant General Mian Muhammad Afzaal; HI(M) SI(M) SBt	January 1988	August 1988	6 Lancers
18		Lieutenant General Shamim Alam Khan, NI(M) SBt SJ	May 1989	April 1991	20 Lancers
19		Lieutenant General Asif Nawaz Janjua; NI(M) HI(M) SBt	April 1991	August 1991	5 Punjab Regiment
20		Lieutenant General Farrakh Khan	August 1991	July 1994	15th Lancers
21		Lieutenant General Jehangir Karamat; NI(M) SBt	July 1994	January 1996	13 Lancers
22		Lieutenant General Iftikhar Ali Khan; HI(M) SBt	January 1996	May 1997	11 Baluch Regiment
23		Lieutenant General Ali Kuli Khan Khattak; HI(M)	May 1997	October 1998	12 Baloch Regiment
24		Lieutenant General Muhammad Aziz Khan; NI(M) HI(M) SBt TBt	October 1998	August 2000	12 Punjab Regiment
25		Lieutenant General Muhammad Yusaf Khan	August 2000	October 2001	The Guides Cavalry (Frontier Force)
26		Lieutenant General Shahid Aziz	October 2001	December 2003	10th Baloch Regiment
27		Lieutenant General Tariq Majid; NI(M)	December 2003	October 2006	28 Baloch Regiment
28		Lieutenant General Salahuddin Satti	October 2006	October 2008	40 Punjab Regiment
29		Lieutenant General Muhammad Mustafa Khan	October 2008	April 2010	38 Cavalry
30		Lieutenant General Khalid Shameem Wynne; NI(M) HI(M)	April 2010	October 2010	20 Punjab Regiment
31		Lieutenant General Waheed Arshad; HI(M) TBt	October 2010	January 2013	16 Horse
32		Lieutenant General Rashad Mahmood; NI(M) HI(M)	January 2013	November 2013	7 Baluch Regiment
33		Lieutenant General Ishfaq Nadeem Ahmad; HI(M)	29 November 2013	8 April 2015	34 Azad Kashmir Regiment
34		Lieutenant General Zubair Mahmood Hayat; NI(M)	April 2015	November 2016	3 (Self Propelled) Medium Regiment Artillery
35		Lieutenant General Bilal Akbar	December 2016	August 2018	Corps of Artillery
36		Lieutenant General Nadeem Raza; NI(M) HI(M)	August 2018	November 2019	10 Sind Regiment
37		Lieutenant General Sahir Shamshad Mirza	November 2019	September 2021	8 Sind Regiment
38		Lieutenant General Azhar Abbas	8 September 2021	December 2022	41 Baluch Regiment
39		Lieutenant General Muhammad Saeed	December 2022	25 November 2023	10 Sind Regiment
40		Lieutenant General Avais Dastgir	25 November 2023	24 January 2025	58 Cavalry
41		Lieutenant General Syed Aamer Raza	24 January 2025	24 July 2026	6 Lancers
42		Lieutenant General Syed Omer Ahmed Bokhari	October 2026	Incumbent	22 Baloch Regiment

== See also ==
- Vice Chief of the Army Staff (Pakistan)

== Notes ==
1.Later promoted to lieutenant general in-office.

2.Later promoted to the post of a general.

3.Later promoted to Chairman Joint Chief of Staff Committee.
