= Aziz Khan (general) =

Pakistani general

Muhammad Aziz Khan NI(M) HI(M) SBt TBt
- جنرل محمد عزیز خان
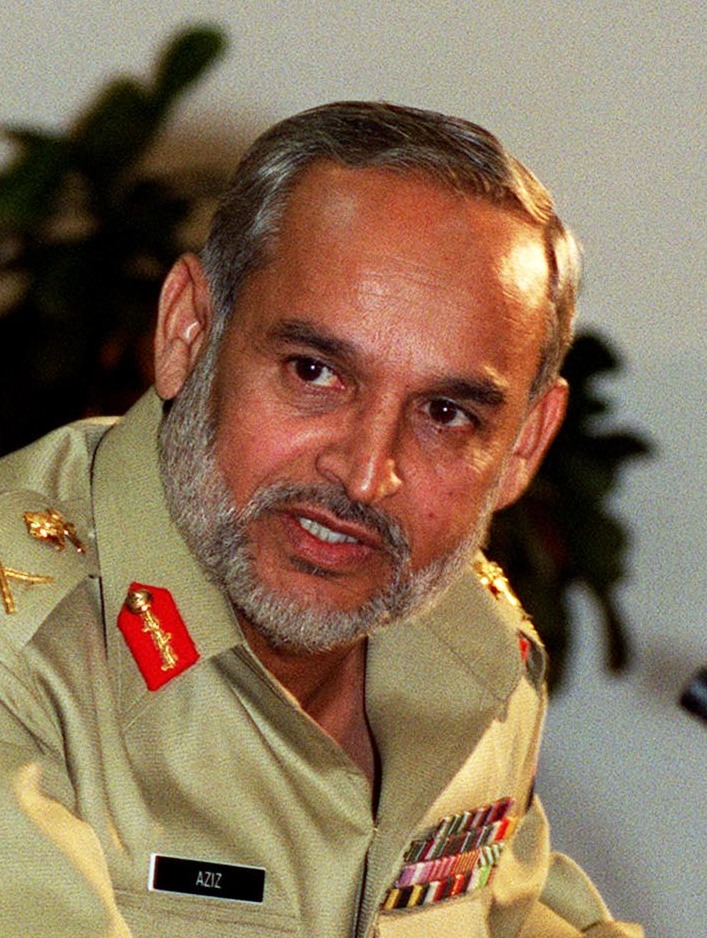
- Gen. Aziz Khan in c. 2001

11th Chairman Joint Chiefs of Staff Committee
- In office 7 October 2001 – 6 October 2004
- Preceded by: Gen. Pervez Musharraf
- Succeeded by: Gen. Ehsan ul Haq

President of the Pakistan Hockey Federation
- In office 2000–2005
- Preceded by: Arif Ali Khan Abbasi
- Succeeded by: Tariq Kirmani

Personal details
- Born: Muhammad Aziz Khan; 1 January 1947 (age 79) Pallandri, Kashmir, British India
- Education: Pakistan Military Academy

Military service
- Allegiance: Pakistan
- Branch/service: Pakistan Army
- Years of service: 1964–2004
- Rank: General
- Unit: 12th Punjab Regiment
- Commands: Chairman Joint Chiefs of Staff Committee; IV Corps; Chief of General Staff; Director ISI (Analysis); Force Command Northern Areas; CO Northern Light Infantry; COS X Corps
- Battles/wars: Indo-Pakistan War of 1965; Indo-Pakistan War of 1971; Indo-Pakistani War of 1999; India-Pakistan standoff 2001; War in Afghanistan; Sri Lankan Civil War
- Awards: Nishan-e-Imtiaz (Military); Hilal-e-Imtiaz (Military); Sitara-e-Basalat; Tamgha-e-Basalat; Order of Military Merit

Muhammad Aziz Khan NI(M) HI(M) SBt TBt (Urdu: محمّد عزیز خان ; 1 January 1947), better known as Aziz Khan, is a retired Pakistani four-star rank army general who served as the 11th Chairman of the Joint Chiefs of Staff Committee, appointed in October 2001 until his retirement in 2005.

Before surprisingly superseding several military officers for the appointment as the Chairman joint chiefs in 2001, Gen. Aziz was the leading general who commanded the Northern Command against the Indian Army in the 1999 Kargil War.

In 1999, Prime Minister Nawaz Sharif had tried to stop a commercial flight from landing with Army Chief Pervez Musharraf onboard so Sharif could appoint a new Army Chief. As a result, Aziz was one of the four army generals who helped to initiate the military turnover, after the plane landed, against the civilian government of Prime Minister Nawaz Sharif.

== Biography ==
Muhammad Aziz Khan was born in Pallandri, Sudhanoti, in British India now Azad Kashmir, Pakistan) on 1 January 1947 to a Sudhan family. He first graduating from the High School Palandri, before joining the Pakistan Army in 1964. He first completed his combat duty with the army during the second war with India in 1965, before being redirected to join the Pakistan Military Academy (PMA).

In 1966, Aziz passed out from the PMA with the class of 1st War Course, (which is junior to 37th PMA but senior to 38th PMA Long Course), gaining commissioned as 2nd-Lt. in the 12th Battalion of the Punjab Regiment. He went to command an infantry platoon during the third war with India in 1971, and was later sent to attend the Command and Staff College where he qualified as a psc. He later went to attend the National Defence University where he graduated with MSc in War studies. In 1980s, Lt-Col. Aziz commanded the 12th Battalion before joining the Zia administration's staff.

In 1980s, Colonel Aziz was selected to be appointed as Military Secretary to President Zia-ul-Haq, assisting him when President Zia went on a state visit to the United States to meet with U.S. President Ronald Reagan. He was later posted as military attaché at the Pakistan Embassy in Washington D.C. for the United States Army to maintain military relations with the U.S. military.

in 1988 Aziz Khan successfully launched the important Dalunang Operation across the LOC was a strong proponent of Pakistani troops crossing the LOC and occupying heights on the Indian side. During the Dalunang Operation, Pakistan had captured 28 peaks. Emphasizing his familiarity with the area, Aziz would often recall, “I have walked in the gaps along the LOC.”

In 1990, Brigadier Aziz was posted as the Chief of Staff of the X Corps which was under Lt. Gen. G.M. Malik before being stationed in Siachen to command the Northern Light Infantry (NLI). In 1991–94, Brig. Aziz eventually moved to command the 80th Brigade attached to the Northern Command stationed in the Azad Kashmir.

== War and Command appointments in the military ==
=== Chief of General Staff and Kargil war with India ===
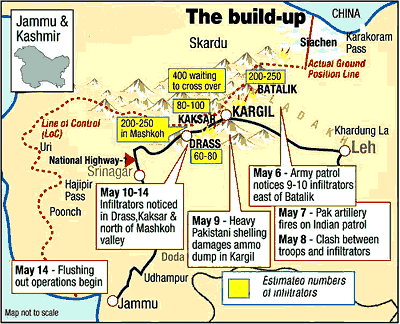
Kargil region in 1999: Lt-Gen. Aziz was the leading general in masterminding the area contingency plans for the Northern Command to infiltrate the Indian Kashmir.

In 1994, Brig. Aziz was promoted as two-star rank when he posted as the GOC of the Force Command North based in Gilgit-Baltistan in Pakistan. Maj-Gen. Aziz served as the GOC of the Northern Command until 1996 when he was promoted to the three-star rank, leaving the command of Maj-Gen. Javed Hassan.

In 1996, Maj Gen Aziz was posted to the ISI, directing the ISI's analysis department, which had been responsible for providing analysis and gathering intelligence in India and Afghanistan, until 1998. Aziz was mainly responsible in keeping intelligence on the Talibans in Afghanistan, and had reputation in the country for his ultraconservative views.

In October 1998, Lt. Gen. Aziz was moved to the Army GHQ where he was appointed as the Chief of General Staff, a second-in-command post under the Chief of Army Staff. Himself a Kashmiri, Gen. Aziz was fully committed to the Kashmir cause, he began implementing the plan for covert infiltration in Indian-administered Kashmir, with the approval of the Chief of Army Staff.

Later investigative reports compiled by Pakistani historians and journalists, it was revealed that Lt. Gen. Aziz was the leading general who was masterminding the area contingency operations of the Northern Command led by its GOC Maj-Gen. Javed Hassan. Despite being well aware of the consequences, the writers critically questioned Lt. Gen. Aziz's grand strategy that brought the two nations at the brink of war, with international opinion widely accepting the Indian narrative.

During the heights of the military actions in Kargil region, the Indian intelligence was able to tape the telephonic conversations that took place between the CJCSC and Army Chief Gen. Pervez Musharraf and Chief of General Staff Lt. Gen. Aziz, proving that it was the Pakistan Army that had infiltrated without the official approval from the civilian branch, the government led by Prime Minister Nawaz Sharif. When the conversations were leaked by the India's Union Ministry of Defence, Prime Minister Sharif met with Lt. Gen. Aziz who continuously denied the authenticity of the tapes, later confided to Chairman joint chiefs Musharraf that the success of operation relied on "total secrecy".

Later Pakistani Investigative journalist news reports identified that there were four army generals who were in much control of the area contingency plans in Kargil including Lt. Gen. Mahmud Ahmed, commanding the X Corps, Lt. Gen. Shahid Aziz of ISI's Analysis Wing, and Lt. Gen. Jan Orakzai, commanding the XI Corps, besides Lt. Gen. Aziz.

After the Kargil incident, there were no official military inquiries into this incident nor there were any subsequent evidence that led to the punishment of those responsible for such incidents.

On 12 October 1999, Lt. Gen. Aziz played a decisive role in initiating the military takeover of the civilian government led by Prime Minister Nawaz Sharif when he refused to transfer the control of the military to General Ziauddin Butt. Passing orders to take over the control of the Jinnah Terminal in Karachi, Lt. Gen. Aziz effectively gained control of the military in favor of the Gen. Pervez Musharraf who removed Prime Minister Nawaz Sharif and his administration.

After the President Clinton paid a state visit to Pakistan in 2000, Lt. Gen. Aziz was removed from his position and was appointed as the field commander of the IV Corps stationed in Lahore, which he commanded until 2001.

== Chairman Joint chiefs ==
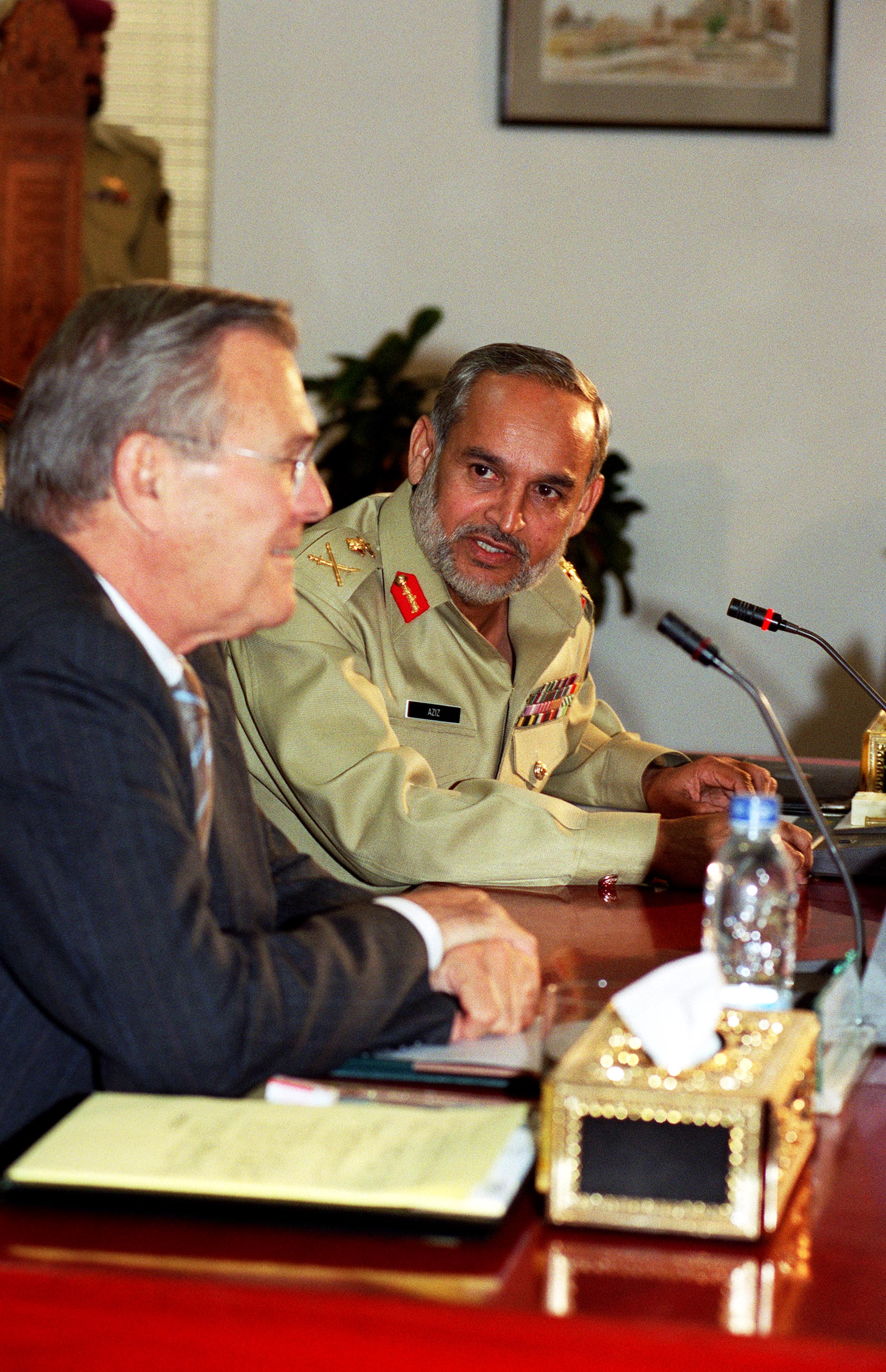
Chairman joint chiefs Gen. Aziz meeting with American Secretary of Defense Donald Rumsfeld to hold discussions on military logistics in the War in Afghanistan in 2001.

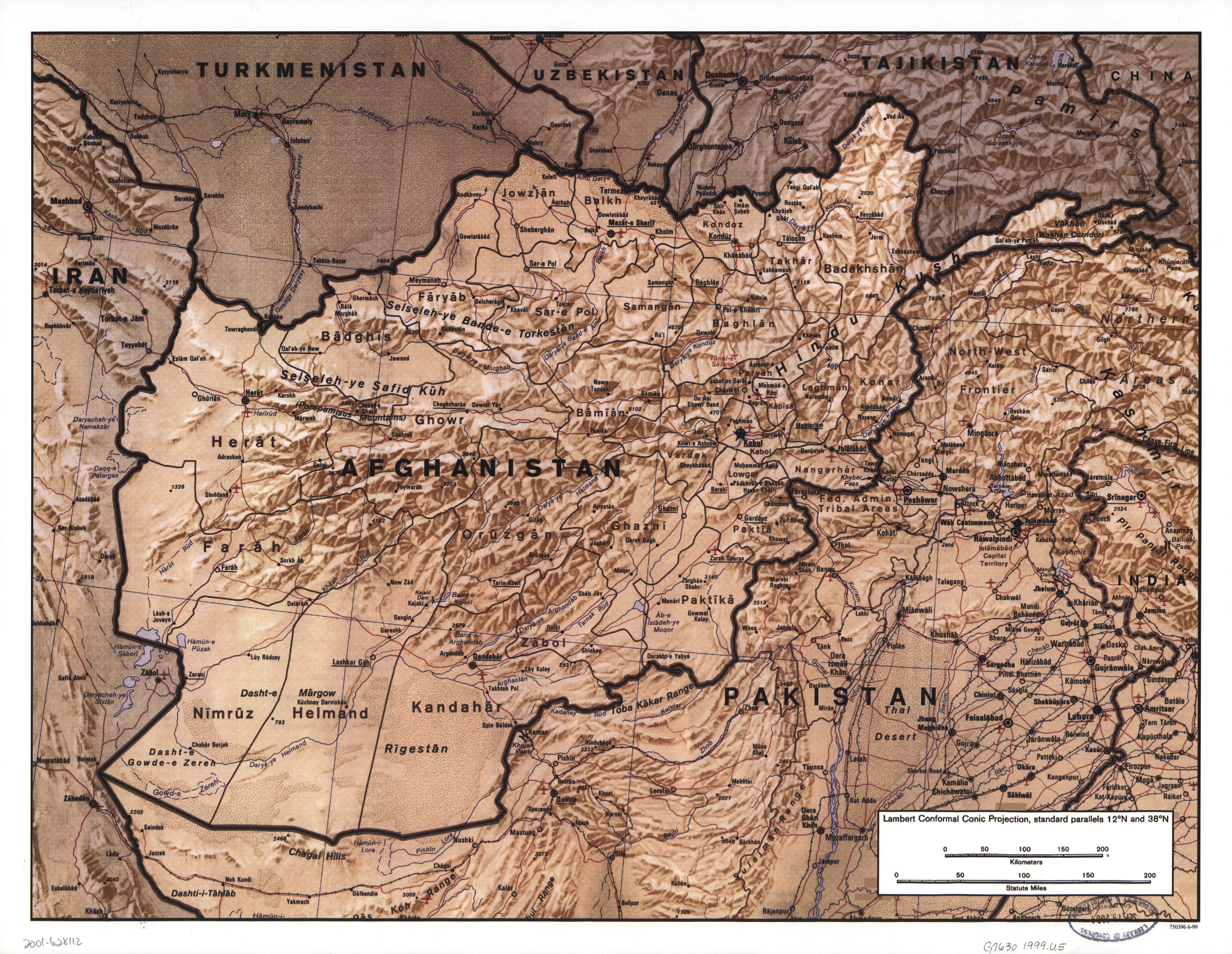
Gen. Aziz had been very critical President Musharraf's policy on siding with the United States against the Taliban in Afghanistan.

On 6 October 2001, Lt. Gen. Aziz was surprisingly promoted to four-star rank with an immediate effect when he was appointed as the Chairman joint chiefs.

This promotion was one of the earliest controversial decisions made by the Musharraf administration, where news media had been very critical of this appointment. At the time of the promotion, Lt. Gen. Aziz was sixth in the seniority with senior army generals who were in the race of promotion to four-star included with seniority:

- Lt. Gen. Muzaffar Usmani –Vice-Chief of Army Staff at Army GHQ in Rawalpindi
- Lt-Gen. Hamid Javaid– Chief of Staff to the President of Pakistan
- Lt-Gen. Mahmud Ahmed– DG ISI
- Lt-Gen. Khalid Maqbool–Chairman of the National Accountability Bureau (NAB) in Islamabad
- Lt-Gen. Yusaf Khan–Chief of General Staff (CGS) at Army GHQ in Rawalpindi
- Lt-Gen. Aziz Khan–Field Commander of the IV Corps, stationed in Lahor, Punjab, Pakistan

While Gen. Yusaf and Gen. Aziz were elevated to their four-star commanding appointments, the remaining four army generals seek their retirement when they tendered their resignations. Resignations of Mahmud Ahmed and Osmani were widely rumoured due to their closeness to the terrorists outfits. He also stayed as the Colonel-in-Chief of the Punjab Regiment appointed by General Pervez Musharraf on 21 March 2003.

Upon appointed, Gen. Aziz called on President Musharraf, thanking the president for the promotion. Despite his initial support for Gen. Musharraf, Aziz Khan soon regretted playing his part in bringing to help stabilize Gen. Pervez Musharraf's role against the civilian government when he lectured and quoted: "politics should not be done in uniform."

In 2001, Gen. Aziz publicly came out against President Pervez Musharraf's policy on siding with the United States, without effectively addressing the issue of containing the terrorists organizations. He viewed the American attack on Afghanistan with great suspicion, and had held sympathetic views towards the Talibans in Afghanistan, and harboured strong anti-American views when he termed the Americans as "number one enemy".

In a response to the terrorist attack on Indian parliament in 2001, Gen. Aziz oversaw the troop deployment across the border amid the military standoff, and supportive towards the Chinese mediation between the relations of two countries.

In 2003, Gen. Aziz went to visit Sri Lanka where he met with Sri Lankan President Chandrika Kumaratunga where he agreed to provide military assistance to Sri Lanka to their civil war. In 2005, Gen. Aziz's timely retirement was confirmed by President Musharraf and disassociate himself with Aziz with further political appointments despite rumors. Gen. Aziz was succeeded by Gen. Ehsan ul Haq, amid another controversial appointment in 2004.

== Awards and decorations ==

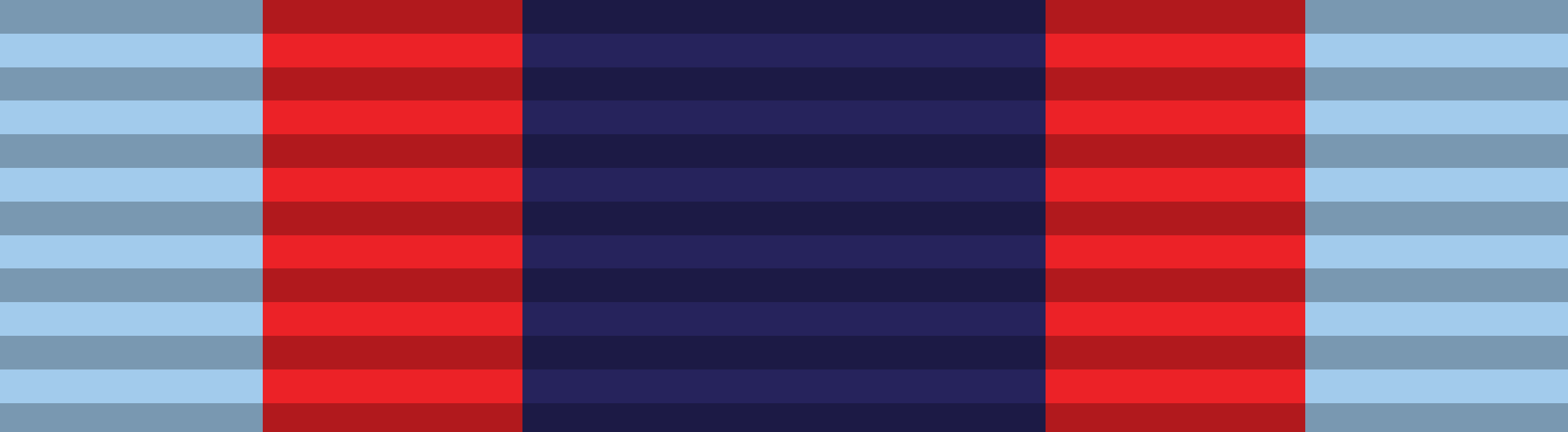

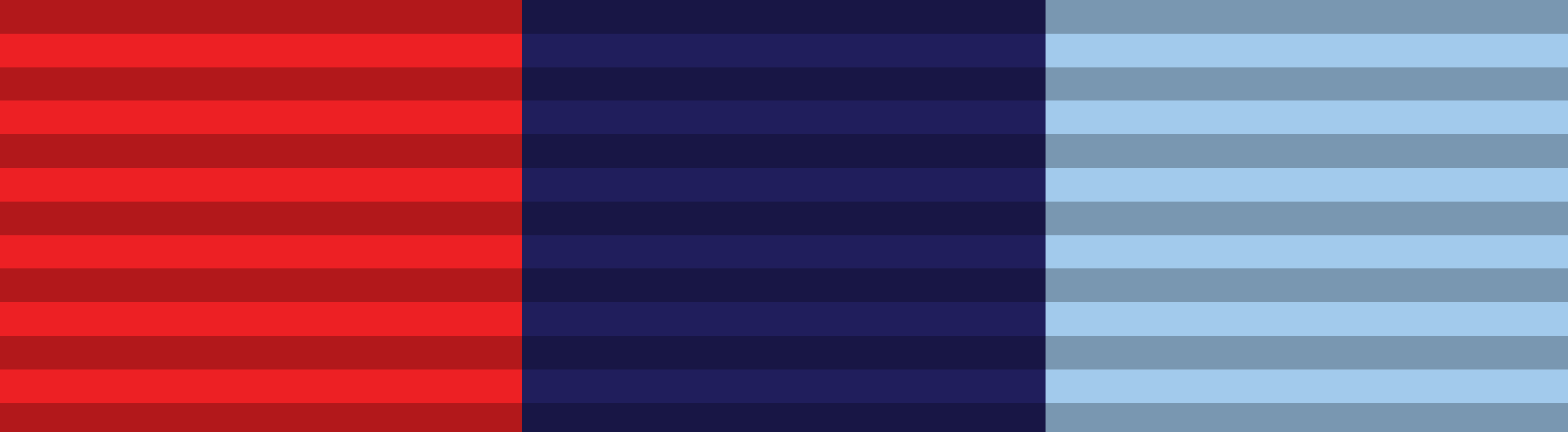

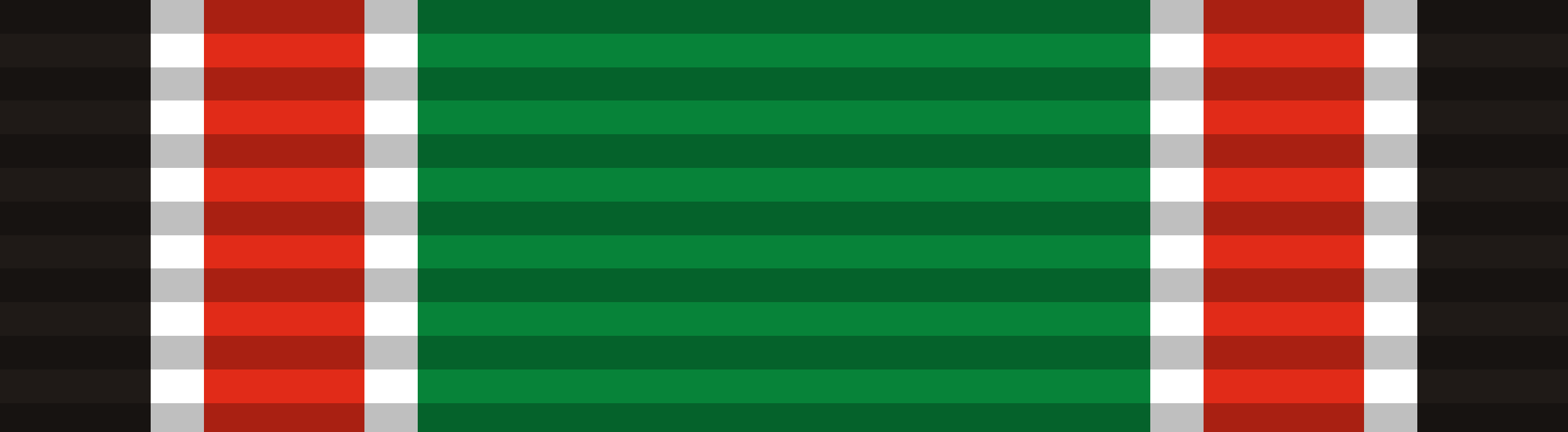

	Nishan-e-Imtiaz (Military) (Order of Excellence)		
Hilal-e-Imtiaz (Military) (Crescent of Excellence)	Sitara-e-Basalat (Star of Good Conduct)	Tamgha-e-Basalat (Medal of Good Conduct)	Tamgha-e-Diffa (General Service Medal) Siachen Glacier Clasp
Tamgha-e-Jang 1965 War (War Medal 1965)	Tamgha-e-Jang 1971 War (War Medal 1971)	Tamgha-e-Baqa (Nuclear Test Medal) 1998	Tamgha-e-Istaqlal Pakistan (Escalation with India Medal) 2002
10 Years Service Medal	20 Years Service Medal	30 Years Service Medal	35 Years Service Medal
40 Years Service Medal	Tamgha-e-Sad Saala Jashan-e- Wiladat-e-Quaid-e-Azam (100th Birth Anniversary of Muhammad Ali Jinnah) 1976	Hijri Tamgha (Hijri Medal) 1979	Jamhuriat Tamgha (Democracy Medal) 1988
Qarardad-e-Pakistan Tamgha (Resolution Day Golden Jubilee Medal) 1990	Tamgha-e-Salgirah Pakistan (Independence Day Golden Jubilee Medal) 1997	Command and Staff College; Quetta Instructor's Medal	The Order of Military Merit (Grand Cordon) (Jordan)

=== Foreign decorations ===
Foreign Awards
Jordan	The Order of Military Merit (Grand Cordon)

== See also ==
- Anti-American sentiment in Pakistan
- Fiscal-military state
- Gang of Four in Pakistan Army
- Islamic fundamentalism
- Kashmiriyat
- Pakistan Army and state-sponsored terrorism
- Power and politics
- State within a state

Military offices
Preceded by Ali Kuli Khan Khattak	Chief of General Staff; 1998 – 2000	Succeeded by Yusaf Khan
Preceded by Pervez Musharraf	Chairman Joint Chiefs of Staff Committee; 2001 – 2004	Succeeded by Ehsan ul Haq
