= 1999 Pakistani coup d'état =

1999 military takeover of government in Pakistan led by pervez Musharraf to gain power

- Part of military coups in Pakistan
| Date | 12 October 1999 |
| Location | Prime Minister's Secretariat, Islamabad |
| Result | Military takeover of the federal government of Nawaz Sharif in a bloodless coup.; Mass nationwide arrest of PML(N) workers and detainment of PML(N)'s leadership.; Nawaz Sharif and Shehbaz Sharif arrested and later exiled, as a result of an agreement, on 10 December 2000.; General Musharraf became Chief Executive and reformed National Security Council to run the state affairs of the country.; The writ of Constitution provisionally suspended.; Suspension of Pakistan from the Commonwealth of Nations.; Chief Justice of Pakistan, including nine Senior justices refused to take an oath and resigned.; Media blackout of Sharif-aligned conservative mass media. No censorship imposed on liberal/libertarian mass media.; President Rafiq Tarar forced to resign from office.; Pakistani general election, 2002; End of the two-party system in Pakistan |

Belligerents
| Government of Pakistan: Federal Investigation Agency; Inter-Services Intelligence; Intelligence Bureau; Government of Punjab | Pakistan Army; Pakistan Navy; Pakistan Air Force |

Commanders and leaders
| Nawaz Sharif; Mushtaq Ahmed; Ziauddin Butt; Iqbal Niazi; Shehbaz Sharif; Jehan Zaib Burki | Pervez Musharraf; Fasih Bokhari; Abdul Aziz Mirza; Ehsan ul Haq; Aziz Khan; Mahmud Ahmed; Muzaffar Hussain Usmani; Shahid Aziz; Pervaiz Mehdi Qureshi |

Units involved
| Punjab Police | Pakistan Army: X Corps 111 Infantry brigade; V Corps |

Strength
| ~170,000 | ~617,000 |

Casualties and losses
| None | None |

The 1999 military takeover in Pakistan was a bloodless coup d'état initiated by the military staff at the Joint Staff HQ working under the Chairman of the Joint Chiefs of Staff Committee and Chief of Army Staff General Pervez Musharraf. The instigators seized control of the civilian government of the popularly elected Prime Minister Nawaz Sharif on 12 October 1999. On 14 October, General Musharraf, acting as the country's Chief Executive, issued a controversial provisional order that suspended the Constitution of Pakistan.

Martial law was declared due to the breakdown of civil-military relations. Tensions between the Sharif administration and joint chiefs chairman General Musharraf reached a breaking point. In an attempt to maintain civilian control over the military, Lieutenant-General Ziauddin Butt, then Director of the ISI, was hastily approved for the appointment of the army chief, but the decision was opposed by senior members of the Joint Staff HQ, who refused to follow the new chain of command, deciding instead to direct the Military Police to detain General Butt and prevent his taking control of the military.

The pace of the coup startled political observers; within 17 hours of Sharif's attempt to relieve General Musharraf, army commanders took control of all key government institutions throughout the country and placed Sharif and his administration, which included his brother, under house arrest. Military police took control of the state broadcaster, radio and the entire critical communications infrastructure, and announced that Sharif had been dismissed.

The Supreme Court of Pakistan led by Chief Justice Irshad Hassan Khan validated the martial law under a "doctrine of necessity" but limited its legality to three years. Meanwhile, Sharif was tried by the Judge Advocate General Court and convicted of endangering the lives of all passengers aboard the aircraft carrying Musharraf, with the military court upholding the decision. When the decision was announced, it sparked fury in the conservative PML(N) but was welcomed by many of its political opponents. In 2000, the Supreme Court accepted arguments that the coup was a "violation of the constitution". However, acting Chief Justice Ershad Hasan later argued of the constitutionality of the coup.

On 10 December 2000, Musharraf unexpectedly issued a pardon to Nawaz Sharif to be flown to Saudi Arabia. In 2016, Musharraf later confessed in an interview given to Kamran Shahid of Dunya that "he pardoned Sharif from life imprisonment on the request of King Abdullah and Rafic Hariri."

In 2001, Musharraf issued the executive decree and eventually forced President Rafiq Tarar to resign in order for Musharraf to assume the presidency. In light of the Supreme Court's verdict, the national referendum was held on 30 April 2002, allowing himself to continue his rule, but was alleged by many (including the Human Rights Commission of Pakistan) to be fraudulent. In 2002, the general elections restored democracy when the Musharraf-backed PML(Q), the libertarians, were able to form a minority government who would later nominate Musharraf for the 2004 presidential elections. In 2007, President Musharraf eventually imposed another martial law by having suspended the populist Chief Justice IM Chaudhry, leveling charges of corruption and misconduct. Unlike the earlier martial law, Musharraf was widely disapproved, inviting mass demonstrations led by Nawaz Sharif, Musharraf eventually resigned in an attempt to avoid impeachment in the Parliament.

Sharif was acquitted in 2009 from the 1999 hijacking case and in 2014 acquitted of the money laundering and corruption cases from an accountability court.

== Events leading towards the martial law ==
=== Relief of General Jehangir and Kargil debacle ===
In 1997, Nawaz Sharif and his conservative Pakistan Muslim League-N won a landslide victory in the general elections, resulting in a two-thirds majority in the National Assembly– the lower house of bicameral Parliament of Pakistan.

His second tenure was marked with a serious legal confrontation with the Supreme Court courted by Chief Justice Sajjad Ali Shah over the legality and technicality of Thirteenth Amendment and the Ehtesab Act, 1997 (lit. Accountability Act, 1997). Chief Justice Shah had been battling in the Supreme Court for his legitimacy due to many senior justices had seen his appointment as "inappropriate and political", having been appointed by former prime minister Benazir Bhutto in 1994. On 29 October 1997, Chief Justice Shah and his bench decided to hear the petition filed by the Pakistan Peoples Party's lawyers and suspended the implementation of bills. Prime Minister Sharif reacted angrily to the Court's actions, by issuing an intemperate public diatribe particularly against Chief Justice Shah. On 2 November 1997, Chief Justice Shah summoned Prime Minister Sharif for contempt of court but this order was viewed "null and voided" when two senior justices at the Supreme Court issued a counter-order. On 30 November 1997, Prime Minister Sharif appeared before the Supreme Court but his partisans stormed the Supreme Court Building forcing Chief Justice Shah to remove the finding of contempt against Sharif. While the police gained control of the situation to restore law and order, the whole nation witnessed traumatising and terrifying scenes on their television screens broadcast by the news media all over the country.

Subsequently, the Supreme Judicial Council took up a case against the appointment of Chief Justice Shah on 23 December and declared Chief Justice Shah's appointment "illegal and unconstitutional" that eventually forced him to resign from his office on 2 December 1997. President Farooq Leghari who supported the cause of Chief Justice Shah also had to resign when army chief General Jehangir Karamat and Chairman joint chiefs Air Chief Marshal Feroze Khan intervened to resolve the crises. Prime Minister Sharif eventually appointed his Chief Justice Saeeduzzaman Siddiqui based on merit qualification and offered presidency to former supreme court justice Rafiq Tarar who was elected in 1998.

In 1998, Prime Minister Sharif effectively relieved Chairman Joint Chief of Staff Committee General Jehangir Karamat from the command of the military when General Karamat delivered a college lecture at the Naval War College in Karachi. At this lecture, General Karamat called for establishing the National Security Council (NSC) which would be backed by a "team of civil-military experts" for devising policies to seek resolution ongoing problems relating the civil-military issues; also recommended a "neutral but competent bureaucracy and administration of at federal level and the establishment of Local governments in four provinces.

Relieving of General Karamat plummeted Sharif's own public approvals and his relations with the military, as even his senior Cabinet ministers were in disagreement of Sharif's decision. Many political observers were taken in complete surprise since the dismissal of four-star rank general had never happened before in country's history.

Eventually, Sharif chose then-Lieutenant-General Pervez Musharraf over two senior army generals for the appointment to post of the army chief and acting Chairman Joint Chief of Staff Committee. A year later, the civil military relations took a sharp turn in the opposition of Sharif when he invited and received Indian Prime Minister Atal Vajpayee in Lahore for peace talks, much to agitation of General Musharraf who did not welcome outcomes of Lahore Summit.

In 1999, the Pakistan Army soldiers secretly crossed the Line of Control (LoC) and infiltrated in Kargil on the direct orders issues by General Musharraf, bringing the two nations at the brink of war. The Indian Army reacted with launching of full-fledged military coordinated operations while Indian government effectively put diplomatic pressure on Sharif's government to withdraw the soldiers from the Kargil sector. Both Sharif and General Musharraf held each other responsible for the actions in the Kargil sector, charging each other of lying and hiding details of the hostilities to the nation.

At the public circle, Sharif assigned blame for the political/diplomatic disaster on General Musharraf, and Musharraf placing the blame on Prime Minister Sharif. In September 1999, General Musharraf forcefully retired Lieutenant-General Tariq Pervez who was known to be close to Sharif and cousin of Raja Nadir Pervez, the Communications Minister.

Upon meeting with Sharif, General Tariq Pervez had ultimately warned Sharif of "making any move against General Musharraf or the army would strike."

=== Revolt of the Admiral ===
The revolt of Admiral Fasih Bokhari, the Chief of Naval Staff, over Sharif's public decision of extending General Musharraf's tenure as Chairman Joint Chief of Staff Committee until 2001 was another issue that saw the breaking down of civil-military relations. About the Kargil war, Admiral Bokhari was not of the view of supporting the Pakistan Army's engagement with the Indian Army as appropriate and subsequently lodged a powerful protest against General Musharraf's grand strategy while recommending the constitution of a commission to completely probe the Kargil issue.

At the country's news media, Admiral Bokhari publicly questioned the effectiveness of the military strategy behind the Kargil infiltration and was very critical of General Musharraf's unilateral decisions involving the national security, as Chairman Joint Chief of Staff Committee, without considering the opinions of Chiefs of Staff of Pakistan Air Force and the Pakistan Navy.

In 1999, Sharif quarrelled with Admiral Bokhari and his Navy NHQ staff over the merit-based appointment of General Musharraf to the Chairman Joint Chiefs that was only meant to be temporary and it was hoped that Admiral Bokhari would be appointed to the post. In August 1999, there were rising tensions between Admiral Bokhari and Prime Minister Sharif over issue of incident took place in Sir Creek, although both had kept the working relations on good terms.

In September 1999, General Musharraf had sent a message to Prime Minister Sharif that "anyone in the Navy and Air Force can become the Chairman Joint Chiefs as I did not care." General Musharraf reportedly backed Admiral Bokhari's bid for the Chairman Joint Chiefs but he was overshadowed by the Prime Minister who confirmed and extended General Musharraf's term until 2001.

Civil-military relations were further damaged when Admiral Bokhari lodged a strong protest against this decision in the news media and reportedly revolted against Prime Minister Sharif's appointment for the Chairman Joint Chiefs in 1999. Admiral Bokhari abruptly tendered his resignation to the Prime Minister Sharif and noted to Sharif that since General Musharraf was his junior and often referred to him as "Sir".

On 5 October 1999, Admiral Bokhari resigned from the command of the Navy as the news media construed Admiral Bokhari's resignation merely as unhappiness over not being appointed as Chairman of the Joint Chiefs of Staff Committee. Admiral Bokhari's revolt saw the meltdown of the civil-military relations between the elected civilian government and the military leaders that eventually led to the military overtaking the civilian government by dismissing Prime Minister Sharif on 12 October 1999.

== The military takeover ==
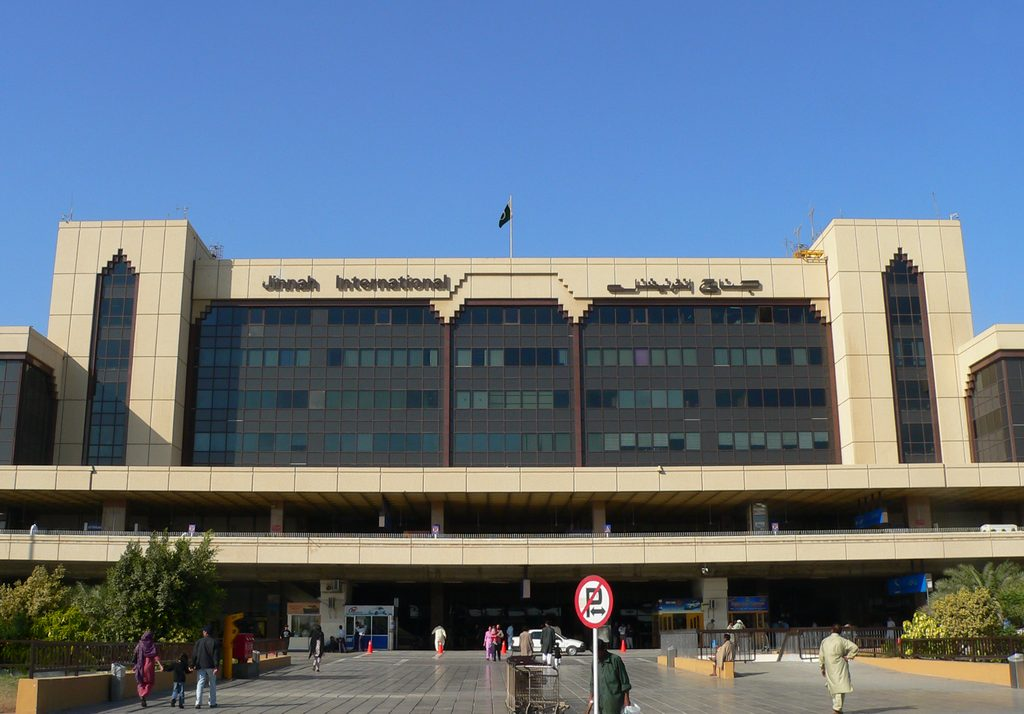
Jinnah International Airport, where Chairman Joint Chiefs Gen. Musharraf landed in Karachi, c.] 2006.

In the aftermath of the Kargil War, followed by the Atlantique incident, there were widespread rumors and media speculations in the television news media about the either possible military takeover or resignation of General Musharraf in September 1999.

In October 1999, General Musharraf paid an official visit to Sri Lanka on an invitation of Sri Lankan Army Commander Lieutenant-General Srilal Weerasooriya. Ultimately, Prime Minister Sharif dismissed General Musharraf from the command of the military and nominated Lieutenant-General Ziauddin Butt, the DG ISI, over several army officers on 12 October 1999. Developments came when General Musharraf, along with Major-General Tariq Majid and Brigadier Nadeem Taj, returned to Pakistan on a PIA Airbus A300.

According to the sources, the Civil Aviation Authority (CAA) was ordered by Sharif to divert the plane to India but then it was rerouted to Shaheed Benazirabad, then known as Nawabshah. When this was failed to be comprehended by the pilot, the CAA was ordered to close the runways by turning off the edge lights at the Jinnah International Airport in an attempt to refuse the landing. The units of military police led by Lieutenant-General Iftikhar sealed the civilian airport and seized the control tower, allowing the plane to land on a runway. From the control tower, then Karachi Corps Commander General Muzaffar Hussain Usmani contacted General Musharraf, in his flight and assured him that landing the plane was safe since the army now controlled Jinnah Terminal. The military police seized the control of the state-run media television headquarters and encircled the Prime Minister Secretariat building while gaining control of the international airports and cutting off the international phone lines.

There were four army generals who were central in staging Musharraf's coup against Sharif's government: General Ehsan ul Haq, Aziz Khan, Mahmood Ahmad, and Shahid Aziz. These four officers played a crucial role in installing General Musharraf as Chief Executive while they detained Sharif in a local prison. On 14 October 1999, Musharraf appeared on television to declare a state of emergency and issued a Provisional Constitutional Order that ultimately suspended the writ of the Constitution of Pakistan and dissolved the National Assembly and four provincial assemblies, although they left Muhammad Rafiq Tarar in office as President.

However, General Musharraf strongly objected the wordage use of "martial law" or "coup d'état", instead insisting that: "This is not martial law, only another path towards democracy." The ISPR also confirmed that "There is no martial law in the country."

=== Text of Proclamation of Emergency ===
Soon after taking over the country, an emergency was declared in the country. Following is the text of the Proclamation of Emergency declared by Musharraf:

In pursuance of deliberations and decisions of chiefs of staff of the Armed Forces and corps commanders of Pakistan Army, I General Pervez Musharraf, chairman joint chiefs of staff committee and chief of army staff, proclaim emergency throughout Pakistan and assume the office of the chief executive of the Islamic Republic of Pakistan.

I hereby order and proclaim as follows:

(a) The constitution of the Islamic Republic of Pakistan shall remain in abeyance

(b) The President of Pakistan shall continue in office

(c) The National Assembly, the Provincial Assemblies and Senate shall stand suspended

(d) The chairman and deputy chairman of the Senate, the speaker and deputy speaker of the National Assembly and the provincial assemblies shall stand suspended

(e) The prime minister, the federal ministers, ministers of state, advisers to the prime minister, parliamentary secretaries, the provincial governors, the provincial chief ministers, the provincial ministers and the advisers to the chief ministers shall cease to hold office

(f) The whole of Pakistan will come under the control of the Armed Forces of Pakistan.

This proclamation shall come into force at once and be deemed to have taken effect on the 12th day of October, 1999.

=== Text of Provisional Constitutional Order 1999 ===
Following is the text of Provisional Constitutional Order (PCO) promulgated by Musharraf. After its proclamation, the order was modified on multiple occasions:

In pursuance of Proclamation of the 14th day of October, 1999, and in exercise of all powers enabling him in that behalf, the Chairman Joint Chiefs of Staff Committee and Chief of Army Staff and Chief Executive of the Islamic Republic of Pakistan under the Proclamation of Emergency of 14th day of October 1999 (hereinafter referred to as the Chief Executive) is pleased to make and promulgate the following Order:

1.

(1) This Order may be called Provisional Constitution Order No.1 of 1999;

(2) It extends to the whole of Pakistan;

(3) It shall come into force at once.

2.

(1) Notwithstanding the abeyance of the provisions of the Constitution of the Islamic Republic of Pakistan, hereinafter referred to as the Constitution, Pakistan shall, subject to this Order and any other Orders made by the Chief Executive, be governed, as nearly as may be, in accordance with the Constitution.

(2) Subject as aforesaid, all courts in existence immediately before the commencement of this Order, shall continue to function and to exercise their respective powers and jurisdiction provided that the Supreme Court or High Courts and any other court shall not have the powers to make any order against the Chief Executive or any person exercising powers or jurisdiction under his authority;

(3) The Fundamental Rights conferred by Chapter I of Part II of the Constitution, not in conflict with the Proclamation of Emergency or any Order made thereunder from time to time, shall continue to be in force.

3.

(1) The President shall act on, and in accordance with the advice of the Chief Executive;

(2) The Governor of the Province shall act on, and in accordance with the instructions of the Chief Executive.

4.

(1) No Court, Tribunal or other authority shall call or permit to be called in question the proclamation of Emergency of 14th day of October, 1999 or any Order made in pursuance thereof.

(2) No judgment, decree, writ, order or process whatsoever shall be made or issued by any court or tribunal against the Chief Executive or any authority designated by the Chief Executive.

5. Notwithstanding the abeyance of the provisions of the Constitution, but subject to the Orders of the Chief Executive, all laws other than the Constitution shall continue in force until altered, amended or repealed by the Chief Executive or any authority designated by him.

6. The Proclamation of Emergency issued on 28th day of May 1998, shall continue but subject to the provisions of Proclamation of Emergency dated 14th day of October 1999 and this Provisional Constitution Order and any other Order made thereunder.

7. All persons who, immediately before the commencement of this Order, were in the service of Pakistan as defined in Article 260 of the Constitution and those persons who immediately before such commencement were in office as Judge of the Supreme Court, the Federal Shariat Court or a High Court or Auditor-General or Ombudsman and Chief Ehtesab Commissioner, shall continue in the said service on the same terms and conditions and shall enjoy the same privileges, if any.

== Impact ==
Upon hearing the news of Sharif's arrest, the PML(N) partisans and the party leadership led by Javed Hashmi, a conservative politician in Lahore and Mamnoon Hussain in Karachi called out and led massive street demonstrations and protests in the streets of Lahore, Karachi, and other cities.

The conservative supporters of Nawaz Sharif did not welcome this coup and saw this event as a conspiracy but many of Sharif's rivals welcomed this coup, holding celebration parties around different parts of the country. Although there were reports of unconfirmed media blackout of Sharif-aligned conservative media, no restrictions were imposed on the liberal/libertarian news media.

There were reports of repression and human rights abuse taken place by the authorities under General Musharraf, as the pro-democracy demonstrations were forcefully and effectively crushed by Musharraf's regime.

=== Legality and legitimacy of the coup ===
The Supreme Court of Pakistan in c. 2004.

The Supreme Court of Pakistan courted by the Chief Justice Saeeduzzaman Siddiqui partially provided the legality of the martial law in a view of "doctrine of necessity" after Musharraf's lawyer Sharifuddin Pirzada argued for the martial law on technicality, but its legality was only limited to three years. Meanwhile, Sharif was tried by the military judge advocate general where allegations of corruption, terrorism, and money laundering were leveled against him. Eventually, the military court's inconclusive rulings found him to be guilty and convicted him for risking the life of all the passengers on board including the sitting Chairman joint chiefs.

On 15 November 1999, the Supreme Court of Pakistan decided to hear the petitions filed by PML-N's lawyer Zafar Ali Shah on behalf of Sharif and Aitzaz Ahsan requesting a supreme court's intervention to declare the military takeover "illegal and unconstitutional", and order the restoration of Sharif's government and reinstatement of the National Assembly and four provincial assemblies that were suspended. The PML(N)'s lawyers began their court battle with the Musharraf's lawyers when additional petitions were filed by PML(N), Muslim Welfare Movement, and Wahabul Khairi, an advocate challenging the legality of the coup.

On 1 December 1999, a five-member bench of the Supreme Court was constituted to hear these appeals and as lawyers of each side to present cases of their clients. The bench headed by Chief Justice Saeeduzzaman Siddiqui and head Justice Bashir Jahangiri, Justice Nasir Aslam Zahid, Justice Abdur Rehman Khan and Justice Wajihuddin Ahmed as other members.

=== Provisional Constitutional Order judges oath ===
As the hearing progressed at the Supreme Court, the legality and legitimacy of the coup became an important issue while Sharif's lawyers successfully argued for reinstating the writ of the constitution. Chief Justice Saeeduzzaman Siddiqui along with other chief justices were in clear view of this coup as a "violation of the constitution" as Sharif's lawyers made a ground base for finding Musharraf of treason.

On 26 January 2000, Chief Executive Musharraf, acting on the advice of Sharifuddin Pirzada, quickly promulgated the Provisional Constitutional Order and asked Chief Justice Siddiqui alongside other justices to take a new oath under this provision. Chief Justice Saeeduzzaman Siddiqui and other nine judges of the thirteen Supreme Court justices refused to take the oath which became an issue identified as the "biggest challenge" to the new government. Eventually, Chief Justice Saeeduzzaman Siddiqui and other nine judges resigned from their respected appointments, followed by a number of other High Court justices also refused to take the oath. The Provisional Constitutional Order disallowed challenging any actions made by the military-led by General Musharraf, and many judges who refused to take the oath cited infringements upon the judiciary system such as this as their reasoning for refusing. The Provisional Constitutional Order provided Musharraf legal protection of his actions in regards to the military taker over and bared any court in the country for taking any legal actions against Musharraf or those who were responsible for the military coup.

Asma Jahangir, a Pakistani lawyer and human rights advocate, reportedly stated: "The military rulers are doing their best to erode the independence of the judiciary. I salute those judges who have refused to take the oath."

== Aftermath ==
=== Pardon of Sharif and 2002 referendum ===
On 9–10 December 2000, Chief Executive Pervez Musharraf unexpectedly issued a pardon of Nawaz Sharif and allowed the immediate members of former first family to travel to Saudi Arabia on a private jet provided by the Saudi Royal Family. Details emerged in successive years of this pardon that resulted in a forced signing of an agreement that put him in exile for a decade. However, this agreement was voided in successive years when Musharraf himself went to court to bar Sharif from returning to Pakistan in 2007.

In 2016, Musharraf later confessed in an interview given to Kamran Shahid of Dunya that "he pardoned Nawaz Sharif from life imprisonment on the request of King Abdullah and Rafic Hariri".

On 12 May 2000, the Supreme Court of Pakistan courted by Chief Justice Irshad Hasan finally legalized the coup but ordered to hold a nationwide election to restore the writ of the government.

In 2001, General Musharraf issued the executive decree, of which, President Tarar was of the view that such decree was unconstitutional and illegal. Eventually, Musharraf forcefully removed President from his office when the latter forced President Tarar to forcefully resigned as president. In the light of Supreme Court's verdict, the national referendum was held on 30 April 2002, allowing himself to continue his rule. The referendum, which Musharraf won with almost 98% of the votes in his favour, was alleged by many, including the Human Rights Commission of Pakistan, to be fraudulent.

=== Allegations of illegitimacy ===
Human rights groups such as Amnesty International Pakistan and Human Rights Commission and others had denounced the referendum as extremely fraudulent in 2002. The Reuters journalists claimed to see ballot stuffing and pressure to vote being placed on governmental employees. Ibn Abdur Rehman, director of the Human Rights Commission, dismissed the referendum as "farcical", also claiming that votes were stuffed. The Amnesty International Pakistan and the Human Rights Commission of Pakistan stated that the voting irregularities "exceeded its worst fears".

The PML(N), backed by the Human Rights Commission, challenged the results of the referendum but Chief Justice Irshad Hasan Khan dismissed the petitions while rejecting the challenge and upholding the results. Information Minister Nisar Memon dismissed allegations of fraud as propaganda created by the opposition and stated that "Those who opposed the referendum preferred to stay at home and didn't create any problem."

The credibility of the claims of illegitimacy is added when American Pattan Development Organization conducted a Gallup survey that founded that the "people are likely to elect either Benazir Bhutto or Nawaz Sharif as the next prime minister" in preference to President General Pervez Musharraf. According to the survey, Musharraf had only 9% public approval as opposed to Benazir Bhutto and Nawaz Sharif.

=== Foreknowledge about coup ===
In 1999, Lt. Gen Tariq Pervez, Commander, XII Corps, had ultimately warned Nawaz Sharif of a military take over if Musharraf were dismissed from the command of the military. In the television news media and the political pundits had long speculating of a military takeover in the country as soon as General Karamat was dismissed by Prime Minister Sharif, and General Musharraf himself had sent a secret message of serious repercussion if he was to be removed. It is claimed by authors that Prime Minister Sharif had well political intelligence on Musharraf's intention and had sought US President Bill Clinton's help against the military intervention.

In 1999, Benazir Bhutto held all blames on Nawaz Sharif for the military takeover and criticized him stating "the man is violating every rule of law and, there is no-one to stop him."

In 2002, Admiral Bokhari quoted that: he knew about General Musharraf's plans to topple [Prime Minister] Nawaz Sharif and did not want to be part of these "Dirty Games". Admiral Bokhari also noted that a power struggle between an elected Prime Minister and appointed-Chairman joint chiefs ensued and relations were severely damaged after the Kargil war.

Admiral Bokhari testified in media that: "The two men could not work together, both were preparing to take active actions against each other. I could see that there now two centres of power on a collision course". At an informal meeting held at the Navy NHQ in September 1999, Chairman Joint Chiefs General Musharraf indicated his displeasure with Prime Minister Nawaz Sharif's handling of the country describing Prime Minister Sharif as "incompetent and incapable of running the country." Admiral Bokhari firmly got the impression whether General Musharraf was sounding out to rely on the support from the Navy in events of the coup and Admiral Bokhara discouraged the Chairman joint chiefs from doing so.

In 2003, Musharraf squarely blamed Nawaz Sharif for the military take over and held responsible for the martial law against his government while accused him of being an autocrat and weakening the might of the military.

== Legacy ==
=== Political opposition and dissents ===
In a views of historian, Mazhar Aziz, the military coup d'état is seen as an "striking example in the case study of civil military relations" in a post–Cold War era.

In 1999 and in 2004, Sharif extended his apologies to various journalists and reporters for any wrongdoings and worked towards mending better relations with influential conservative news media after his exile. In 2001, the PML(N) and its rival PPP reached a compromised when the formed democracy restoration alliance in a view to oust President Musharraf. Major agitations took place in 2005 against President Musharraf's anti-terrorism policy and controversial amendments made in the constitution. In 2006, Sharif joins hand with Benazir Bhutto in opposition to Musharraf when both signed an agreement to restore parliamentary democracy in the country.

In 2006, the PML(N) issued a white paper concerning the Kargil events and Nawaz Sharif personally apologized to former Chief Justice Sajad Ali Shah and the former president Farooq Leghari for his role and his party's actions. Sharif also extended his apology to General Karamat and Admiral Fasih Bokhari for overlooking him for the appointment of the Chairman joint chiefs.

In 2007, Nawaz Sharif with his family, accompanied by his daughter, returned to Pakistan with thousands of his supporters receiving Sharif family. In 2008, Sharif spearheaded the judicial activism in order to protest the suspension of Chief Justice I.M. Chaudhry by Musharraf.

=== Opposition and dissent within the military ===
In 2001–03, the principal four army generals, General Ehsan ul Haq, Gen. Aziz Khan, Lt-Gen. Mahmud Ahmed, and Lt-Gen. Shahid Aziz later regretted their role in bringing Gen. Musharraf in power when all four generals were forced out from their service due to opposition showed to President Musharraf's policies. General Aziz Khan was retired as a four-star general from the position of CJCSC in 2005 and was succeeded by General Ehsan ul Haq, who was retired as a four-star general from the position of CJCSC in 2007 (the longest service by any of Gen. Musharaff's closest generals). General Mahmud Ahmed was retired on 8 October 2001 as DG-ISI (The Day United States started its war in Afghanistan). General Shahid Aziz was retired in 2004 as Lt-Gen.

== Trial and sentence ==
On 17 December 2019, Musharraf was handed the death sentence for treason by a three-member bench of a special court in Pakistan.

== See also ==
- Overconfidence effect
- Social command and control
  - The Soldier and the State
- History of the Supreme Court of Pakistan
  - 2007 Pakistani state of emergency
  - 2002 Pakistani general election
  - Provisional Constitutional Order
  - State of emergency
  - PCO Judges case
- Conservatism in Pakistan
  - Two-party system
- State of emergency
  - Military coups in Pakistan
