= Iqbal Khan (general) =

Pakistani general (1924–2000)

Muhammad Iqbal Khan NI(M) HI(M) SI(M) SBt
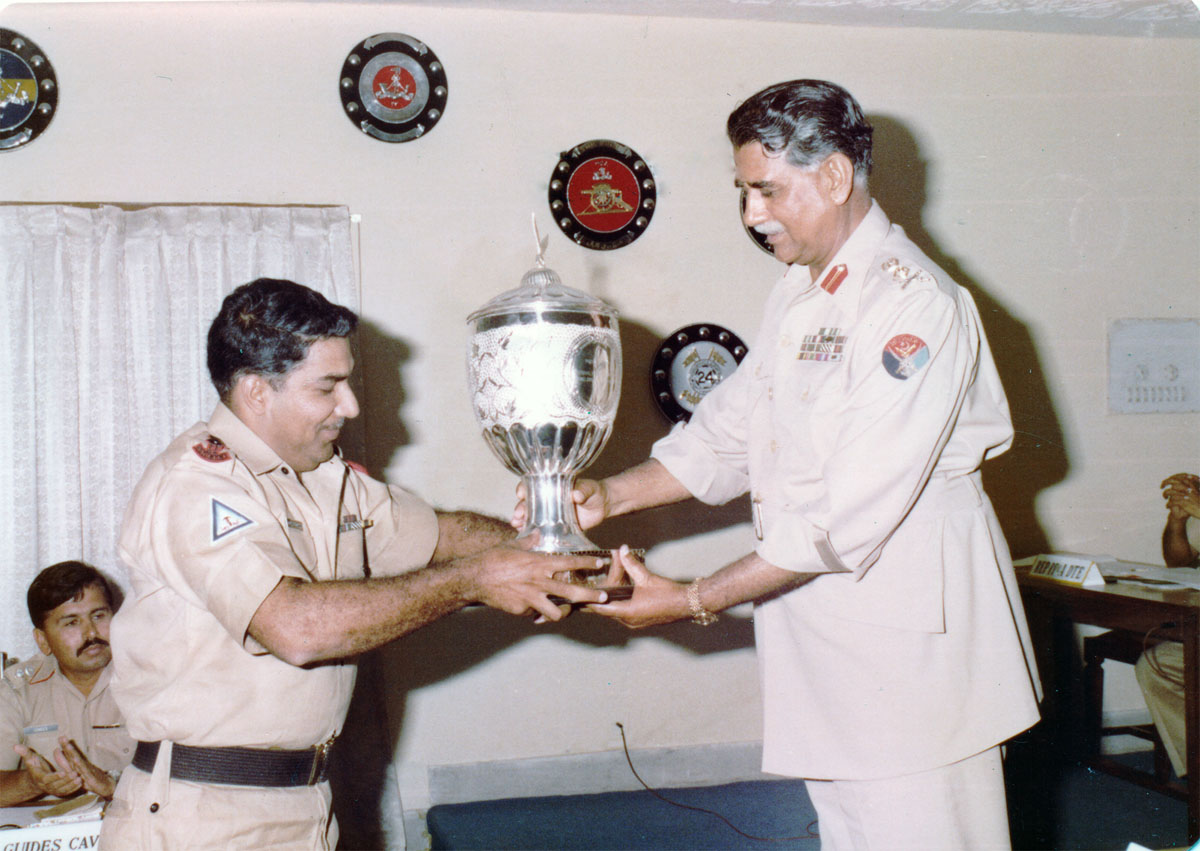
- Khan (right) c. 1980

3rd Chairman Joint Chiefs of Staff Committee
- In office 13 April 1980 – 22 March 1984
- Preceded by: Admiral Mohammad Shariff
- Succeeded by: General Rahimuddin Khan

Personal details
- Born: Mohammad Iqbal Khan Pindi Gheb, Punjab, British India
- Died: Rawalpindi, Punjab, Pakistan
- Awards: Nishan-e-Imtiaz (Military); Hilal-e-Imtiaz (Military); Sitara-e-Imtiaz (Military); Sitara-e-Basalat
- Nickname: M.I. Khan

Military service
- Allegiance: British Raj (1944–1947); Pakistan (1947–1984)
- Branch/service: (British Raj) British Indian Army; Pakistan Army
- Years of service: 1944–1984
- Rank: General
- Unit: Guides Infantry, Frontier Force
- Commands: Chairman Joint Chiefs of Staff; Deputy Chief of Army Staff; V Corps in Karachi; IV Corps in Lahore; Chief of General Staff, Army GHQ; 33rd Infantry Division, Quetta; DG Military Intelligence (DG MI)
- Battles/wars: Indo-Pakistani War of 1947; Indo-Pakistani War of 1965; Indo-Pakistani War of 1971; Bangladesh Liberation War; Operation Searchlight; Fourth Balochistan Conflict; Soviet–Afghan War

Mohammad Iqbal Khan NI(M) HI(M) SI(M) SBt (Urdu: اقبال خان; 1924–2000) was a four-star general in the Pakistan Army who served as the third Chairman Joint Chiefs of Staff Committee from 1980 to 1984.

== Biography ==
Mohammad Iqbal Khan was educated and graduated from the Military College in Jhelum and was commissioned in the British Indian Army in 1944. He joined the Guides Infantry in the 2nd Frontier Force Regiment as 2nd-Lt. and later serving in the first war with India on Kashmir front in 1947.

After participating in the lost Second war with India in 1965, Brigadier Iqbal was appointed as the Director-General of the Military Intelligence in 1969, and was politically involved in supporting the Pakistan Peoples Party (PPP) against the Awami League. Eventually, Brig. Iqbal held the responsibility of Military Intelligence in 1971.

In 1971–73, Major-General Iqbal held the command of the 33rd Infantry Division in Quetta as its GOC, and oversaw the military operations against the armed insurgency groups in Balochistan in Pakistan.

In 1974, Major General Iqbal was posted as Chief of General Staff (CGS) under Chief of Army Staff General Tikka Khan at the Army GHQ in Rawalpindi which he served until 1976. In 1976, Maj-Gen. Iqbal was promoted to the three-star rank army general and was posted as field commander of the IV Corps based in Lahore.

In 1977, Lieutenant-General Iqbal took over the control of the Punjab in Pakistan as its martial law administrator when Chief of Army Staff Gen. Zia-ul-Haq imposed the martial law against the civilian government on 5 July 1977. Lt-Gen. Iqbal was later rotated when Lt-Gen. Sawar Khan took command of the IV Corps, and appointed as the field commander of the V Corps and served as the martial law administrator of Sindh in Pakistan.

In 1978, Lt-Gen. Iqbal was again posted at the Army GHQ in Rawalpindi when he was appointed as the Deputy Chief of Army Staff (DCOAS) under President Zia-ul-Haq. During this time, he was appointed as the Colonel Commandant of the Frontier Force Regiment, which he served until his retirement in 1984.

== Chairman Joint chiefs (1980–1984) ==
In 1980, Lt-Gen. Iqbal, who at that time was the senior military officer in the military, was promoted to the four-star rank and appointed as the Chairman Joint Chiefs of Staff Committee.

In 1980, Gen. Iqbal played a crucial role in maintaining of the Afghan Arabs in the country and supported the anti-Russian agitation when Soviet Union intervened in Afghanistan. Gen. iqbal eventually and coordinated the national security meetings concerning the covert efforts in Afghanistan. In 1984, Gen. Iqbal completed his four-year term and eventually retired from the military.

== Awards and decorations ==

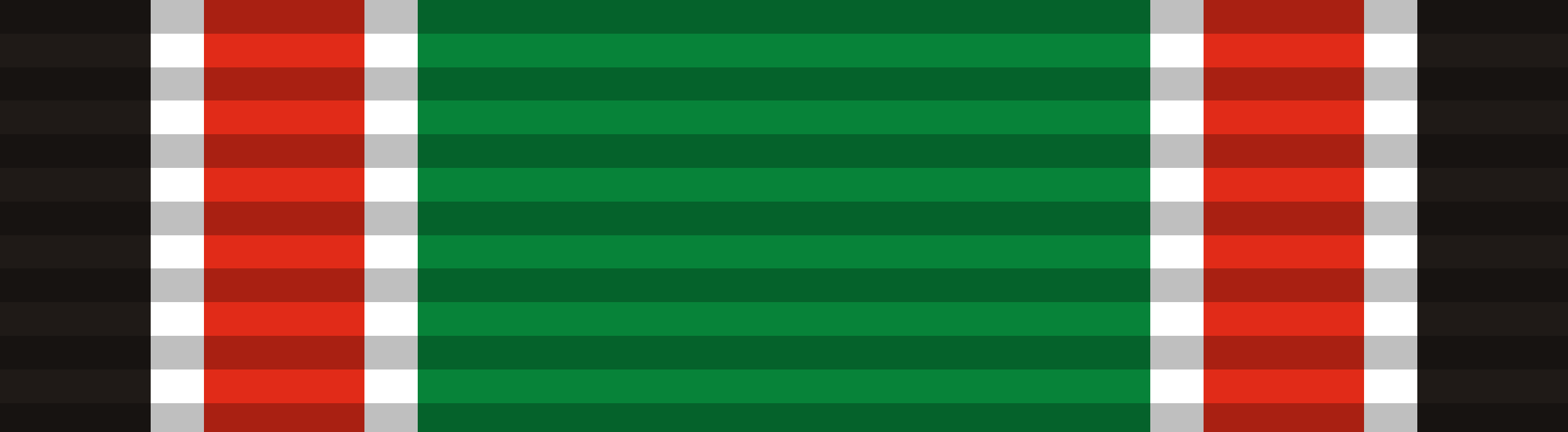

| Nishan-e-Imtiaz (Military) (Order of Excellence) | | Hilal-e-Imtiaz (Military) (Crescent of Excellence) | |
| Sitara-e-Imtiaz (Military) (Star of Excellence) | Sitara-e-Basalat (Star of Good Conduct) | Tamgha-e-Diffa (General Service Medal) | Tamgha-e-Jang 1965 War (War Medal 1965) |
| Tamgha-e-Jang 1971 War (War Medal 1971) | Pakistan Tamgha (Pakistan Independence Medal) 1947 | Tamgha-e-Sad Saala Jashan-e- Wiladat-e-Quaid-e-Azam (100th Birth Anniversary of Muhammad Ali Jinnah) 1976 | Tamgha-e-Jamhuria (Republic Commemoration Medal) 1956 |
| Hijri Tamgha (Hijri Medal) 1979 | Order of Military Merit (Jordan) | War Medal 1939-1945 | United Nations UN UNOC 1 Medal (Congo Clasp) |

=== Foreign Decorations ===
Foreign Awards
| Jordan | The Order of Military Merit |
| UK | War Medal 1939-1945 |
| UN | UN UNOC 1 Medal |

Military offices
| Preceded by M. Rahim Khan | Chief of General Staff; 1974–1976 | Succeeded by Abdullah Malik |
| Preceded by Mohammad Shariff | Chairman Joint Chiefs of Staff Committee; 1980–1984 | Succeeded by Rahimuddin Khan |
