= Mahmud Ahmed =

Pakistani general (born 1944)

Mahmud Ahmed HI(M)
- Mahmud as Lt.Gen

Director General of the Inter-Services Intelligence
- In office 20 October 1999 – 7 October 2001
- President: Rafiq Tarar; Pervaiz Musharraf
- Preceded by: Gen. Ziauddin Butt
- Succeeded by: Lt-Gen. Ehsan ul Haq

Commander Rawalpindi Corps
- In office 25 October 1998 – 20 October 1999
- President: Rafiq Tarar
- Prime Minister: Nawaz Sharif
- Chief of Army Staff: Gen. Pervaiz Musharraf
- Preceded by: Lt-Gen. Saleem Haider
- Succeeded by: Lt-Gen. Jamshed Gulzar Kiani

President of the National Defence University
- In office 5 June 1998 – 25 October 1998
- President: Rafiq Tarar
- Prime Minister: Nawaz Sharif
- Chief of Army Staff: Gen. Jahangir Karamat; Gen. Pervaiz Musharraf
- Preceded by: Lt-Gen. Maqbool Ahmad
- Succeeded by: Lt-Gen. Salahuddin Tirmizi

Personal details
- Born: Mahmud Ahmed c. 1944 (age 81–82) Ludhiana, Punjab, British India (Present-day in Punjab in India)

Military service
- Allegiance: Pakistan
- Branch/service: Pakistan Army
- Years of service: 1964–2001
- Rank: Lieutenant-General
- Unit: Pakistan Army Artillery Corps (PA-7710)
- Commands: Director General of the ISI; Corps of Artillery; X Corps in Rawalpindi; DG Military Intelligence; 23rd Infantry Division
- Battles/wars: Indo-Pakistan War of 1965; Indo-Pakistan War of 1971; Kargil War; India-Pakistan Standoff of 2001; War in Afghanistan
- Awards: Hilal-e-Imtiaz (Military)

Mahmud Ahmed HI(M) (Urdu: محمود احمد; b. 1944) is a retired Pakistani three-star rank army general who served as the Director-General of the Inter-Services Intelligence from 1999 to 2001.

He commanded the X Corps against the Indian Army during the Kargil War in Indian-administered Kashmir in 1999, and was identified as one of the four army generals who helped initiate the 1999 Pakistani coup d'état against the elected civilian government of Prime Minister Nawaz Sharif. As the DG ISI, Mahmud actively supported the sponsorship of the Islamic fundamentalism by endorsing the Talibans in Afghanistan under its emir Mullah Omar in 2000.

Despite helping Gen. Pervez Musharraf's usurp power from the civilian government, Lt-Gen. Ahmad was notably forced to retire from his commission when his involvement surfaced in alleged financing of the Hamburg cell led by Mohamed Atta, an al-Qaeda operative in 2000-01.

== Biography ==
Mahmud Ahmed was born in 1944 in Ludhiana, Punjab in British India, and joined the Pakistan Army in 1964 where he did his combat duty, first participating in second war with India in 1965. His family emigrated from India to Bhaiwala, Faisalabad Pakistan after India's partition on 14 August 1947. He secured his graduation from Lawrence College in Murree before attending Pakistan Military Academy in Kakul in 1965.

He passed out from the PMA Kakul in 1966 where he commissioned as 2nd-Lt in the 16th Self-Propelled (SP) in the Corps of Artillery. Lieutenant Ahmed was the regimental colleague of then army Captain Pervez Musharraf. He participated in the third war with India on the western front, and he was very critical of defence spending by the Ayub administration after 1965. .

In the 1980s and 1990s, Ahmed served in the ISI where he worked under Lt-Gen. Hamid Gul.

In 1994–95, Major-General Ahmed commanded the 23rd Infantry Division as its GOC, stationed in Jhelum in Punjab, Pakistan.

His career in the military is mostly spent in the military intelligence and became the Director-General of the Military Intelligence (DG MI), when he took it over from then-Maj-Gen. Ali Kuli Khan in October 1995. In June 1998, Maj-Gen. Ahmed was promoted to three-star rank, Lieutenant-General and was moved the President of the National Defence University (NDU) in Islamabad by then-Chairman joint chiefs Gen. Jehangir Karamat.

=== X Corps and Kargil war with India ===
In October 1998, -Chairman joint chiefs Gen. Pervez Musharraf appointed Lt-Gen. Ahmed as the field commander of the X Corps, and as soon as he was appointed to command the X Corps the planning of the covert infiltration in Indian Kashmir begin to implemented under Lt-Gen. Aziz Khan, the CGS under Gen. Musharraf in Rawalpindi. In the military, Lt-Gen. Ahmed was described as ultraconservative, professional and kind to his subordinates though some found him to be control minded with a very short-temper.

Lt-Gen. Ahmed greatly aided in providing the tactical support of mass troop infiltration, starting first by closely and micromanaging the troop deployment near the LoC. In July 1999, he provided the briefing to Prime Minister Nawaz Sharif over the troop deployments, eventually giving a go-ahead for the military operation.

After the Kargil war, the Pakistani Investigative journalist news reports identified that there were four army generals who were in much control of the area contingency plans in Kargil including Lt-Gen. Aziz Khan, the CGS under Gen. Musharraf, Lt-Gen. Shahid Aziz of ISI's Analysis Wing, and Lt-Gen. Jan Orakzai, commanding the XI Corps, besides Lt-Gen. Mahmud. There were no official military inquiries into this incident nor there were any subsequent evidence that led to the punishments of those responsible for such incidents.

On 12 October 1999, Lt-Gen. Ahmed refused to accept to follow the orders of new chain of command set up by then-army chief Gen. Ziauddin Butt and ordered his X Corps to seize the control of the Prime Minister's Secretariat while Lt-Gen. Aziz Khan, the CGS under Gen. Musharraf, took control of the Jinnah Terminal in Karachi.

== Director ISI (1999–2001) ==
=== U.S. visit, 9/11 attacks, and removal ===
After the martial law in 1999, Lt-Gen. Ahmed was subsequently appointed as the Director-General of the Inter-Services Intelligence (ISI), and his tenureship was marked with alleged terror financing of al-Qaeda and sponsoring the Talibans in Afghanistan. On 17 March 2001, Lt-Gen. Ahmad was appointed as the Colonel commandant of the Corps of Artillery at the Artillery Regimental Center on 17 March 2001. Mahmud was later replaced by Lt General Khalid Kidwai as the colonel commandant on 13 October 2004.

In 2001, Lt-Gen. Ahmad regularly visited the United States where he consulted with The Pentagon and CIA officials in the Bush administration in the weeks before and after terrorist attacks took place in New York on 11 September 2001. In fact, he was with U.S. Republican Congressman Porter Goss and U.S. Democratic Senator Bob Graham in Washington, D.C., discussing Osama bin Laden over breakfast, when the attacks of September 11, 2001 took place in New York, United States.

On the morning of Sept. 12, the deputy secretary of state, Richard Armitage, told Mahmood that Pakistan had to make a choice "you are either 100 percent with us or 100 percent against us—there is no gray area." Mahmood expressed willingness to cooperate, however in the afternoon, he told George Tenet, the CIA director, that Mullah Omar, the Taliban chief, was a religious man not a man of violence. On September 16, Musharraf sent a delegation to the Taliban with the mission to convince them to hand over Osama bin Laden which included Lieutenant General Mahmood, and other religious figures. It was learned later that mission actually encouraged Mullah Omar to start a jihad against the US if it attacked Afghanistan.

On 9 October 2001, the Pakistani and the U.S. news media reported that "U.S. authorities sought his removal after confirming the fact that $100,000 were wired to WTC hijacker Mohamed Atta from Pakistan by Ahmad Umar Sheikh at the insistence of Lt-Gen. Mahmud." Mahmud Ahmed was eventually forced to leave the ISI and was also linked to another 9/11 hijacker Mustafa al-Hawsawi. Despite his loyalty to and backing of Pres. Pervez Musharraf, Lt-Gen. Ahmed was immediately removed from the directorship of the ISI, when President Musharraf terminated his commission under US pressure, and was replaced by Lt-Gen. Ehsan ul Haq.

== Post-retirement and Islamic missionary activity ==
After this termination, Ahmed critiqued President Pervez Musharraf's policy on siding with the United States, without effectively addressing the issue of containing the terrorists organizations.

He viewed the American attack on Afghanistan with great suspicion, and had held sympathetic views towards the Talibans in Afghanistan. He later regretted his role in playing his part in bringing to help stabilize Gen. Pervez Musharraf's role against the civilian government when he joined the Alliance for Restoration of Democracy that viewed to removing Musharraf's administration. Ahmed opposed the US invasion of Afghanistan.

After this termination, Ahmed publicly came out against President Pervez Musharraf's policy of siding with the United States, without effectively addressing the issue of containing the terrorists organizations.

He is now a member of Tablighi Jamaat and preaches the teaching of Islam.

== Works ==
He wrote a book initially titled "The Myth of 1965 Victory". It was carefully researched and included numerous maps and other details. It questioned the official Pakistani view about winning the war, and acknowledged that the war was initiated "as a clandestine guerrilla struggle". Upon Musharraf's directive, almost all the copies of the book were bought by Pakistan Army to prevent circulation because the topic was "too sensitive". The book was published with the revised title "History of Indo Pak War 1965". It was published by Services Book Club, a part of the Pakistan military. A few copies of the book have survived in libraries. A version was published in India as "Illusion of Victory: A Military History of the Indo-Pak War-1965" by Lexicon Publishers. A second reprint of the book was published recently in 2017 in Pakistan.

== Awards and decorations ==

	Hilal-e-Imtiaz (Military) (Crescent of Excellence)		
Sitara-e-Harb 1971 War (War Star 1971)	Tamgha-e-Jang 1965 War (War Medal 1965)	Tamgha-e-Jang 1971 War (War Medal 1971)	Tamgha-e-Baqa (Nuclear Test Medal) 1998
10 Years Service Medal	20 Years Service Medal	30 Years Service Medal	Tamgha-e-Sad Saala Jashan-e- Wiladat-e-Quaid-e-Azam (100th Birth Anniversary of Muhammad Ali Jinnah) 1976
Hijri Tamgha (Hijri Medal) 1979	Jamhuriat Tamgha (Democracy Medal) 1988	Qarardad-e-Pakistan Tamgha (Resolution Day Golden Jubilee Medal) 1990	Tamgha-e-Salgirah Pakistan (Independence Day Golden Jubilee Medal) 1997

== See also ==
- Gang of Four in Pakistan Army
- Pakistan Army and state-sponsored terrorism
- Anti-American sentiment in Pakistan
- ISI in Afghanistan
- State within a state
- Power and politics
- Blowback (intelligence)

Military offices
Preceded by Ziauddin Butt	Director General of the Inter-Services Intelligence; 1999 – 2001	Succeeded by Ehsan ul Haq
