= Pakistan Army Corps of Military Police =

Pakistan Army's staff corps for law enforcement

Pakistan Army Corps of Military Police As Known As (CMP)
- Insignia of Military Police
- Active: 1947; 79 years ago
- Country: Pakistan
- Branch: Pakistan Army
- Type: Combat service support
- Role: Administrative and staffing oversight.
- Size: Varies
- HQ/Garrison: Army GHQ in Rawalpindi, Punjab, Pakistan
- Nickname: MP
- Colors Identification: Red and green
- Anniversaries: 1947
- Engagements: Military history of Pakistan
- Decorations: Military Decorations of Pakistan military

Commanders
- Provost Marshal-General: Maj-Gen. Rizwan Afzal
- Notable commanders: Lt-Gen. Faiz Ali Chishti

Insignia
- War Flag

The Pakistan Army Corps of Military Police is a military administrative and the staff service branch of the Pakistan Army. Headquartered at the Army GHQ in Rawalpindi, the Military Police mission to maintain professional conduct, conducting criminal inquiries within the army, and ensure to maintain the discipline in the military.

== History ==
The Corps of Military Police was established in 1947 when the officers of the military police reported to Abbottabad Cantonment in November 1947. Initially, four military police companies were formed to retain in the army; its commanding officer was from British Army.

The Military Police performs the administrative objectives for the Pakistan Army, and is a combat support service branch. From 1954 until 1971, the Military Police was based in Quetta but now reports from Army GHQ in Rawalpindi with Major-General, working under the Chief of the General Staff, usually serves its Inspector-General.

=== Uniforms and berets ===
The MP can be identified by their red berets, white lanyards and belts, and they also wear a white helmet (on duty performed on field) and white brassard with the letters "MP" imprinted in red. The term "red berets" is synonymous with the personnel of the elite Corps of Military Police (MP), since all ranks of this Corps are adorned with the exclusive red berets along with white belts to distinguish themselves from the other Corps of Army.

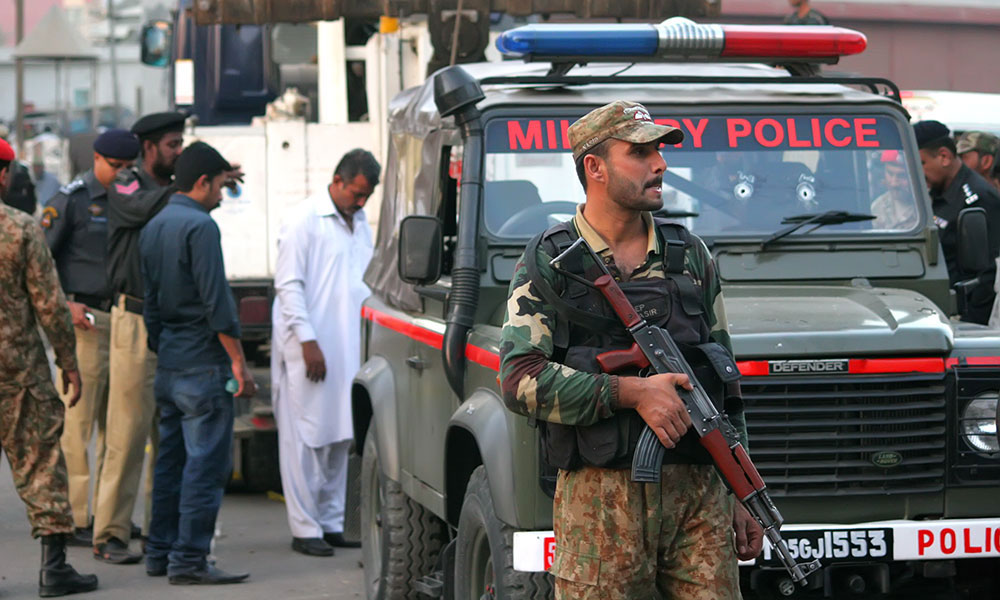
The MP guarding parameters in Karachi.
