= Ziauddin Butt =

Pakistani Army general

Khawaja Ziauddin Abbasi
- Born: Khawaja Ziauddin Abbasi; Lahore, Punjab, British India (present day, Punjab, Pakistan)
- Military career
- Allegiance: Pakistan
- Branch: Pakistan Army
- Service years: 1964–1999
- Rank: General
- Service number: PA–6989
- Unit: Pakistan Army Corps of Engineers
- Commands: Chief of Army Staff (COAS); Director General of the ISI; Adjutant General at the Army GHQ; XXX Corps; Division; DG Combat Development Directorate; GOC 11th Infantry Division
- Conflicts: Indo-Pakistani war of 1965; Indo-Pakistani war of 1971; Afghan Civil war (1996–1999); Indo-Pakistani War of 1999; Military Takeover 1999
- Awards: Hilal-e-Imtiaz
- Other work: Chairman of Chief Minister’s Inspection Team, Punjab Provincial Government.

General Khawaja Ziauddin Abbasi (Urdu: خواجہ ضیاء الدین عباسى), also known as Ziauddin Butt (Urdu: ضیاء الدین بٹ), is a retired four-star rank army general in the Pakistan Army, who served as the Chief of Army Staff (COAS), for few hours, until Chairman joint chiefs General Pervez Musharraf reasserted the command and control of the military despite his termination on 12 October 1999.

His appointment as the chief of army staff is distinguishable since he was the first army engineer and the first Director ISI who was appointed to four-star command appointment. His career in the military spent as an engineering officer Pakistan Army Corps of Engineers before becoming the spymaster in the ISI on 7 October 1998.

After the military's war performance in Kargil against the Indian Army, Prime Minister Nawaz Sharif forcefully terminated the commission of then-Chairman joint chiefs and then-army chief General Pervez Musharraf by elevating General Ziauddin as an army chief on 12 October 1999. This order of promotion was then refused by General Musharraf's military staff as General Musharraf immediately led the military takeover of the civilian government while dismissing General Zia from his appointment and commission.

After a nearly two-year military investigation which found no evidence of his involvement in Prime Minister Sharif's decisions during the coup, Zia retired from his military service in 2001.

In 2011, Ziauddin revealed to the news media that, it was Brigadier Ijaz Shah, the DG of Intelligence Bureau from 2004 to 2008, who had provided the support and hideout to Osama bin Laden in a IB's safe house in Abbottabad. But he later denied making any such statements.

== Early life and education ==
Ziauddin Butt was born in Lahore, Punjab in British India, and is of Kashmiri descent. His birth name is Khawaja Ziauddin Abbasi, but he is known as Ziauddin Butt.

He was educated in Rawalpindi before being accepted at the Pakistan Military Academy in Kakul, prior joining the Pakistan Army. His father, Aftabuddin Butt, was a graduate of the Indian Military Academy in 1943 and was an officer of the 9th Bhopal Infantry, and retired as a Lieutenant Colonel in 1964. His uncle, Ghulam Jilani Khan, was a three-star rank army general in the Pakistan Army who played a crucial role in stabilizing the Zia administration in 1980s and later in creating Pakistan Muslim League faction headed by Nawaz Sharif (later known as PML-N).

== Military career ==
In the military, Ziauddin Butt was reportedly noted for his remarkable academic performance and education, first attended and graduated from the Punjab University with double BSc in honors in Physics and Mathematics before joining the army in 1964.

After his training at the PMA Kakul, Zia decided attend the Military College of Engineering in Risalpur where he gained BSc in Civil engineering with emphasis on construction, standing on the first place on exam markings and earned gold medal in the graduation ceremony. Lt. Ziauddin was then commissioned in the Corps of Engineers, where his career in the army is mostly spent.

In the military, his war performance served with the combat engineering formations during the conflict with India in 1965 and later in 1971. After the war, Zia was selected and sent to the United States where he attended the Defence Mapping School in the Fort Belvoir, Virginia, earning post-graduate diploma in Topography where he specialized as the topographer in 1974–76. In addition, he also attended the National Defence University (NDU) where he gained his BSc in War studies and later attained his MSc in Strategic studies, before rotating back to the Corps of Engineers.

In 1989–90, Major-General Ziauddin briefly served as the GOC of the 11th Infantry Division stationed in Okara before his assignment posted in the JS HQ in Rawalpindi.

In 1990–92, Major-General Ziauddin was appointed as the first Director-General of the Strategic Plans Division (SPD) headquartered in the JS HQ in Rawalpindi, that an agency that oversaw the protection of the country's nuclear arsenals.

In 1993, Major-General Ziauddin was posted on the security details for the technicians working at the Khan Research Laboratories in Kahuta. In 1992, Maj-Gen Ziauddin was posted at the Army GHQ in Rawalpindi, becoming the DG of the Combat Development Directorate (CDD), which he remained until 1996.

On 25 February 1996, Maj-Gen Ziauddin was promoted to the three-star rank army general in the Pakistan Army, and appointed as field commander of the XXX Corps. In 1998, Lieutenant-General Ziauddin was posted as an Adjutant-General at the Army GHQ in Rawalpindi, which he served until 1998 when General Pervez Musharraf was appointed chief of army staff and Chairman joint chiefs at the Army GHQ in Rawalpindi.

=== Director ISI and army chief ===
In 1998, Lt-Gen. Butt had been one of the most senior army generals in the military when Lt-Gen. Ali Kuli Khan and Lt-Gen. Khalid Nawaz were superseded with the four-star appointments of the junior most Lt-Gen. Musharraf. He was subsequently assigned to direct the Inter-Services Intelligence (ISI) by Prime Minister Nawaz Sharif, after replacing Lt-Gen Naseem Rana who was posted as Master-General Ordnance (MGO) at the Army GHQ. Under his command, the ISI is credited with major revamping and evolution of the agency and its operations. On 7 October 1998, Lt-Gen. Butt departed to Afghanistan to meet with Mullah Omar, Emir of Afghanistan at that time, demanded to hand over the 12 most wanted members of fanatic Sipah-e-Sahaba but Mullah Omar refused. Eventually, he authorized the ISI's Covert Action Division teams to infiltrate in Afghanistan, which was successful, but he was unable to convince Mullah Omar to hand over Osama bin Laden to Americans.

He was also one of the senior-most generals ever to occupy the post of Intelligence Chief (DG ISI) and is credited with major revamping and evolution of the agency and its operations.

Despite in commanding position, General Zia did not issue orders to resist such moves in a fear of dangerous in-fighting among the army institution. Both Sharif and Ziauddin were arrested by the coup-makers and taken to different locations. Ziauddin was kept in solitary confinement for two years, and was subject to three army investigations which aimed to find some element of wrongdoing on his part. Musharraf decided to use a 'scouts penalty' – a discretionary punishment not requiring a crime, to dismiss General Ziauddin from service.

Kamran Khan of The News wrote disparagingly about Ziauddin in a news column called "the news/national intelligence unit (NIU)". General Rashid Quraishi was quoted as saying "General Ziauddin was one of the best generals in our army's history, so now we have to change the history". Author Shuja Nawaz (brother of former Pakistan army chief Asif Nawaz) wrote in his book that Musharraf created a false impression that Ziauddin and Prime Minister Nawaz Sharif had family connections.

== Post-retirement ==
Ziauddin Butt, as a retired general, told Carlotta Gall, the correspondent for The New York Times, that he thought Musharraf had arranged to hide Osama Bin Laden in Abbottabad.

He is currently serving as the elected chairman of the LGH Post Graduate Medical Institute.

== See also ==
Military offices
Preceded by Naseem Rana	Director General of the Inter-Services Intelligence; 1998–1999	Succeeded by Mahmud Ahmed
Preceded by Pervez Musharraf	Chief of Army Staff Pakistan Army; 12 October 1999	Succeeded by Pervez Musharraf
