= Gang of Four (Pakistan) =

Central figures in the military coup ďètat in Pakistan

The Gang of Four was a quantified and common colloquial implicit term for an influential set of four military/bureaucratic officials across varying governments in Pakistan's political history.

== 1950s ==
The term was first related to the military-bureaucratic nexus that arose during the first decade of Pakistan's existence, which succeeded in harnessing power at the cost of the country's fledgling parliamentary tradition. The Gang of Four included:

- Ghulam Muhammad, Governor-General of Pakistan
- Iskander Mirza, Interior Minister and future President of Pakistan
- Ayub Khan, Commander-in-Chief of the Pakistan Army
- Chaudhri Muhammad Ali, Finance Minister and future Prime Minister of Pakistan

== 1980s ==
The term was later used to refer to the top generals of the Zia-ul-Haq regime in the 1980s. Most were from or linked to Jalandhar in pre-partition India:

- General Zia-ul-Haq
- General Akhtar Abdur Rahman
- General Khalid Mahmud Arif
- General Zahid Ali Akbar Khan

The term was popularized by Benazir Bhutto (1953–2007) in 1980s in the political science sphere of Pakistan.

== 1990s ==
In 1999, the term was again used by military authors of Kargil War, implicating mastermind of Kargil misadventure and staging military coup d'état against Prime Minister Nawaz Sharif in 1999. The term used to relate General Pervez Musharraf's four generals who staged the coup:

- General Ehsan ul Haq
- General Aziz Khan
- General Mahmud Ahmed
- General Shahid Aziz
