= 2002 Pakistani referendum =

- 30 April 2002
- For the survival of the local government system, establishment of democracy, continuity of reforms, end to sectarianism and extremism, and to fulfill the vision of Quaid-i-Azam, would you like to elect President General Pervez Musharraf as President of Pakistan for five years?

Results
Choice	Votes	%
Yes	42,741,345	97.97%
No	883,676	2.03%
Valid votes	43,625,021	99.36%
Invalid or blank votes	282,935	0.64%
Total votes	43,907,956	100.00%

A referendum on allowing Pervez Musharraf to continue as President for five years was held in Pakistan on 30 April 2002. The proposal was approved by 97.97% of voters. However, the referendum was boycotted by the opposition on the basis that it was unconstitutional. Although turnout was reported to be 56.1%, the opposition claimed it was between 5% and 7%. The poll was criticised for being "marred by gross irregularities" by the Human Rights Commission of Pakistan.

== Background ==
Musharraf came to power in a military coup on 12 October 1999. He initially referred to himself as "Chief Executive", before later removing President Rafiq Tarar from office and assuming the post himself. Musharraf claimed that holding a referendum was abiding by democratic laws, despite the constitution of Pakistan not containing a reference to electing Presidents by referendums.

== Conduct ==
The referendum was seen by many as a sham or fixed. Opposition parties including the Pakistan Peoples Party and the Pakistan Muslim League referred to the decision of Musharraf to hold a referendum as inappropriate and urged citizens to boycott the vote. In response, the voting age was lowered from 21 to 18 and the number of polling stations significantly increased, whilst ID cards were not required for people to cast a vote.

== Results ==
Choice	Votes	%
For	42,741,345	97.97
Against	883,676	2.03
Total	43,625,021	100.00
Valid votes	43,625,021	99.36
Invalid/blank votes	282,935	0.64
Total votes	43,907,956	100.00
Source: BBC
