= Chairman Joint Chiefs of Staff Committee =

Former highest principal staff officer of the Pakistan Armed Forces

Chairman of the Joint Chiefs of Staff Committee
- صدرنشین مجلسِ مشترکہَ رؤسائے افواجِ پاکستان
- Flag of the Chairman Joint Chiefs of Staff Committee
- Pakistan Armed Forces
- Type: Four-star officer
- Status: Leader of the Armed Forces, Highest ranking military officer
- Abbreviation: CJCSC
- Member of: Joint Chiefs of Staff Committee; National Security Council; National Command Authority
- Reports to: Minister of Defence
- Residence: Islamabad, Pakistan
- Seat: Joint Staff Headquarters; Rawalpindi, Pakistan
- Nominator: Prime Minister of Pakistan
- Appointer: President of Pakistan
- Term length: 3 years Renewable once
- Precursor: Chief of Staff to the Commander in Chief of the Army, Navy and Air Force
- Formation: 1 March 1976; 50 years ago
- First holder: General Muhammad Sharif
- Final holder: General Sahir Shamshad Mirza
- Abolished: 27 November 2025; 9 months ago
- Succession: Chief of Defence Forces

The Chairman Joint Chiefs of Staff Committee (CJCSC) (Note: (Urdu: صدرنشین مجلسِ مشترکہَ رؤسائے افواجِ پاکستان)) was Pakistan's highest-ranking and senior most uniformed military officer, from 1976 to 2025, typically at four-star rank. The post was abolished under the 27th Constitutional Amendment in November 2025 and its functions were transferred to the newly created Chief of Defence Forces. The chairman served as the senior uniformed adviser to the Prime Minister of Pakistan, the President of Pakistan, and the National Security Council of Pakistan. The office directed inter-service coordination, joint strategic planning, capability development, and oversight of tri-service institutions including the Strategic Plans Division. Operational command remained with the individual service chiefs. The chairman led the meetings and coordinated the combined efforts of the Joint Chiefs of Staff Committee (JCSC), comprising the chairman, the chief of the Army Staff, the chief of the Air Staff, the chief of the Naval Staff, the commandant of the marines, the director general of the Coast Guards and the Strategic Plans Division, and the commanders of the service branches in the Civil Armed Forces and the National Guard.

Even as the principal staff officer (PSO), the chairman did not have any authority over the command of the combatant forces. The individual service chiefs were solely responsible for the coordination and logistics of the armed and combatant forces. Due to this constraint, the chiefs of the army, navy and air force remained in effective command and control of their respective commands.

The chairman's mandate was to transmit strategic communications to the combatant commanders from the prime minister and president as well as allocate additional funding to the combatant commanders if necessary. The chairman was nominated and appointed by the prime minister and was finally confirmed by the president. Unlike the United States’ Chairman of the Joint Chiefs of Staff, the appointment of the chairman did not require confirmation via a majority vote by the parliament. Instead, the appointment required approval from the prime minister. By statute, the chairman was appointed as a four-star general, four-star air chief marshal, and/or four-star admiral. By law, all four-star officers were required to have extensive experience in the joint uniformed services of Pakistan during their 40-year-long military careers.

The post of CJCSC was created by the former prime minister of Pakistan Zulfikar Ali Bhutto in March 1976, and the first chairman was four star rank officer, General Muhammad Shariff. A total of 18 officer held the office between 1976 and 2025, with Sahir Shamshad Mirza serving as the final CJCSC.

== Appointment preferences ==
Despite the post of the chairmanship is bound constitutionally for the rotation, the army generals are strongly preferred for such post, despite coming short of their qualifications, by the civilian prime ministers in a view of stabilizing the civil military relations.

Unlike the American system where the balance is made between the branches of the U.S. military, the majority of the chairmen are appointed from the department of the army, superseding the officers in the navy, marines, and the air force.

In 1999, Prime Minister Sharif notably refused to appoint the senior most officer, Admiral Fasih Bokhari, to such post in favor of appointing junior-most officer, Gen. Pervez Musharraf. This action of Prime Minister Sharif led towards Adm. Bokhar revolting against this decision in public in 1999, creating strain in the relation between the civilian government and the military.

The four-star admirals in the Pakistan Navy have been notably superseded by the junior army officers, in instances took place in 2005 when Adm. Karim was superseded by junior-most Lt-Gen. Ehsan ul Haq and, in 2011 when Adm. Numan was bypassed in favor of Lt-Gen. Wynne. In 2014, the practice continued by the civil government when Adm. Asif Sandila was bypassed and overlooked when the junior most officer, Lt-Gen. Rashad Mahmood was eventually appointed as Chairman joint chiefs.

Seniority in Navy's Candidacy for Chairman joint chiefs	Eventual Appointment for Chairman joint chiefs from Army	Year Zone of appointment
Adm. Fasih Bokhari	Lt-Gen. Pervez Musharraf	1999
Adm. Shahid Karim-ullah	Lt-Gen. Ehsan ul Haq	2006
Adm. Noman Bashir	Lt-Gen. K. Shamim Wynne	2011
Adm. Asif Sandila	Lt-Gen. Rashad Mahmood	2014

Due to such preferential treatments given to army department, the retired admirals have given a strong criticism of such criterion, expressing their dissatisfaction towards the appointment processes.

== The last Chairman Joint Chiefs of Staff Committee ==
27th Amendment to the Constitution of Pakistan, which determines the federal government's control and command of the armed forces. The amendment proposes changes to the command structure of the military leadership – including abolishing the post of Chairman Joint Chiefs of Staff Committee (CJCSC) from 27 November 2025, and giving broader responsibilities to the Army Chief, who will act as the Chief of Defence Forces. Sahir Shamshad Mirza was the last Chairman Joint Chiefs of Staff Committee (CJCSC) of Pakistan Armed Forces.

== List of Chairman Joint Chiefs of Staff Committee ==
No.	Portrait	Chairman Joint Chiefs of Staff Committee	Took office	Left office	Time in office	Defence branch	Prime Minister	Ref.
1	Muhammad Shariff NI(M), SI(M)	General; Muhammad Shariff NI(M), SI(M) (1921–1999)	1 March 1976	22 January 1977	327 days	Pakistan Army	Zulfikar Ali Bhutto	
2	Mohammad Shariff NI(M), HI(M), SI(M), HJ, SJ, SK	Admiral; Mohammad Shariff NI(M), HI(M), SI(M), HJ, SJ, SK (1920–2020) (Note: General Sharif resigned in 1977 after the coup but had been ineffective from his duty as early as 22 January 1977. Admiral M.S. Khan filled his position on several occasion. General Sharif's resignation was not approved until March 1979.)	22 January 1977	13 April 1980	3 years, 82 days	Pakistan Navy	Zulfikar Ali Bhutto	
3	Iqbal Khan NI(M), SBt	General; Iqbal Khan NI(M), SBt (1924–2000)	13 April 1980	22 March 1984	3 years, 344 days	Pakistan Army	None; 1977 – 1985	
4	Rahimuddin Khan NI(M), SBt	General; Rahimuddin Khan NI(M), SBt (1926–2022)	22 March 1984	28 March 1987	3 years, 38 days	Pakistan Army	Mohammad Khan Junejo	
5	Akhtar Abdur Rahman NI(M), SBt	General; Akhtar Abdur Rahman NI(M), SBt (1924–1988)	29 March 1987	17 August 1988 ‽	1 year, 110 days	Pakistan Army	Mohammad Khan Junejo	
6	Iftikhar Ahmed Sirohey NI(M), HI(M), SI(M), SBt	Admiral; Iftikhar Ahmed Sirohey NI(M), HI(M), SI(M), SBt (1934–2025)	10 November 1988	17 August 1991	2 years, 280 days	Pakistan Navy	Benazir Bhutto	
7	Shamim Allam NI(M), SJ, SBt	General; Shamim Allam NI(M), SJ, SBt (1937–2021)	17 August 1991	9 November 1994	3 years, 84 days	Pakistan Army	Nawaz Sharif	
8	Feroz Khan NI(M), SBt	Air Chief Marshal; Feroz Khan NI(M), SBt (1939–2021)	10 November 1994	9 November 1997	2 years, 364 days	Pakistan Air Force	Benazir Bhutto	
9	Jehangir Karamat NI(M), SBt	General; Jehangir Karamat NI(M), SBt (born 1941)	9 November 1997	7 October 1998	332 days	Pakistan Army	Nawaz Sharif	
10	Pervez Musharraf NI(M), TBt	General; Pervez Musharraf NI(M), TBt (1943–2023)	7 October 1998	7 October 2001	3 years	Pakistan Army	Nawaz Sharif	
11	Aziz Khan NI(M), SBt	General; Aziz Khan NI(M), SBt (born 1947)	7 October 2001	7 October 2004	3 years	Pakistan Army	Zafarullah Khan Jamali	
12	Ehsan ul Haq NI(M)	General; Ehsan ul Haq NI(M) (born 1949)	7 October 2004	7 October 2007	3 years	Pakistan Army	Shaukat Aziz	
13	Tariq Majid NI(M), HI(M)	General; Tariq Majid NI(M), HI(M) (born 1950)	7 October 2007	7 October 2010	3 years	Pakistan Army	Muhammad Mian Soomro; Yousaf Raza Gillani	
14	Khalid Shameem Wynne NI(M)	General; Khalid Shameem Wynne NI(M) (1953–2017)	8 October 2010	8 October 2013	3 years	Pakistan Army	Yousaf Raza Gillani; Raja Pervaiz Ashraf; Mir Hazar Khan Khoso; Mian Muhammad Nawaz Sharif	
-	Ashfaq Parvez Kayani NI(M), HI(M)	General; Ashfaq Parvez Kayani NI(M), HI(M) (born 1952); Acting	8 October 2013	27 November 2013	50 days	Pakistan Army	Nawaz Sharif	
15	Rashad Mahmood NI(M)	General; Rashad Mahmood NI(M) (born 1953)	27 November 2013	28 November 2016	3 years, 1 day	Pakistan Army	Nawaz Sharif	
16	Zubair Hayat NI(M)	General; Zubair Hayat NI(M) (born 1960)	28 November 2016	27 November 2019	2 years, 364 days	Pakistan Army	Nawaz Sharif; Shahid Khaqan Abbasi; Imran Khan	
17	Nadeem Raza NI(M), HI(M)	General; Nadeem Raza NI(M), HI(M) (born 1965)	27 November 2019	27 November 2022	3 years	Pakistan Army	Imran Khan; Shehbaz Sharif	
18	Sahir Shamshad Mirza NI(M), HI(M)	General; Sahir Shamshad Mirza NI(M), HI(M)	27 November 2022	27 November 2025	3 years	Pakistan Army	Shehbaz Sharif	

== Chairman of the Joint Chiefs of Staff by Branch of Service ==
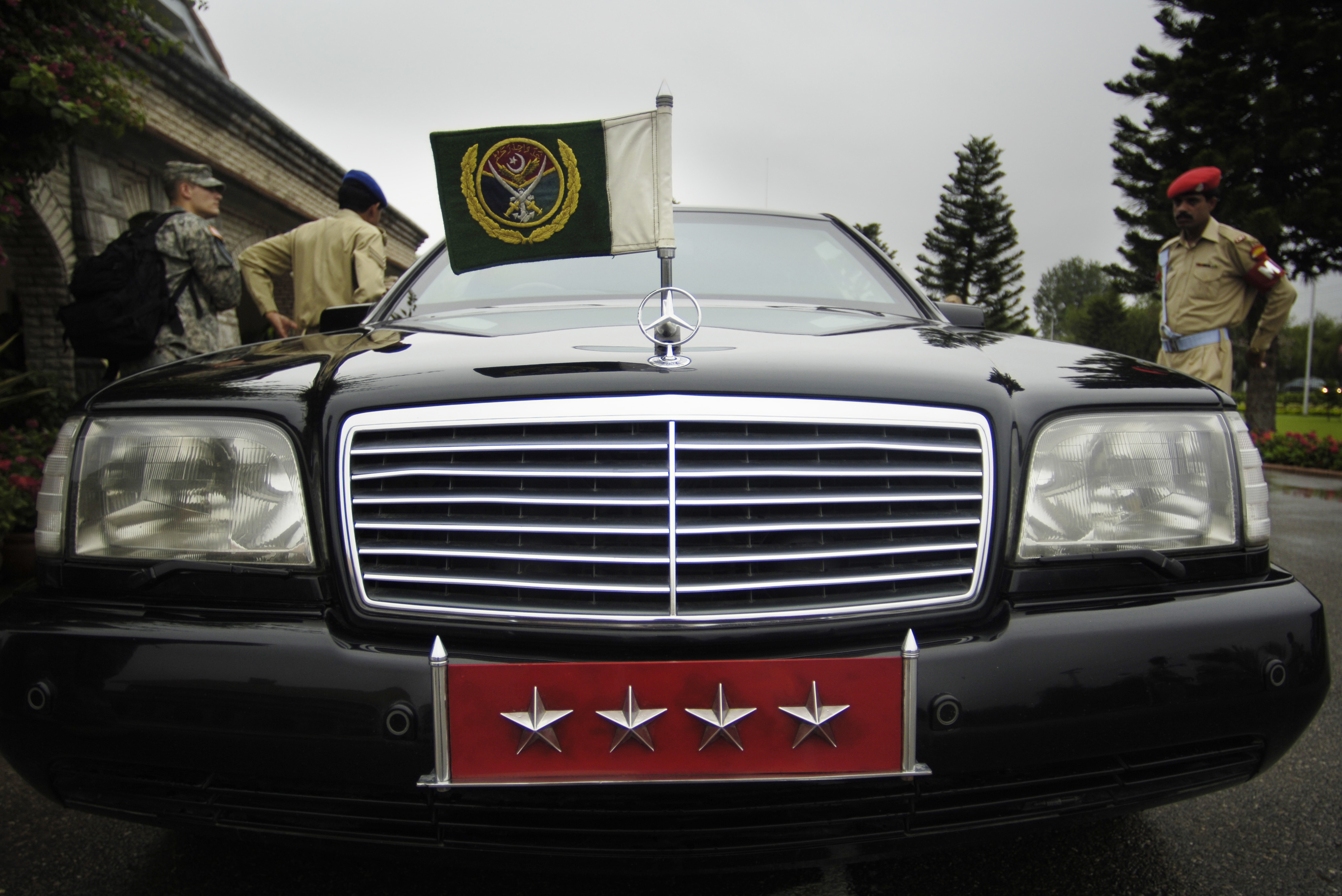
Car used by Chairman Joint Chiefs with the flag and star plate (General Ehsan ul Haq's car in 2006)

- Army - 14
- Navy - 2
- Air Force - 1

== See also ==
- Joint Chiefs of Staff Committee
- Chief of Army Staff (Pakistan)
- Grade 22
- Chief of Air Staff (Pakistan)
- Chief of Naval Staff (Pakistan)
- Chief of General Staff (Pakistan)
- Pakistan Army
- Pakistan Air Force
- Pakistan Navy
