= Ehsan ul Haq =

Pakistani general (born 1949)

Ehsan ul Haq NI(M), HI(M)
- احسان الحق
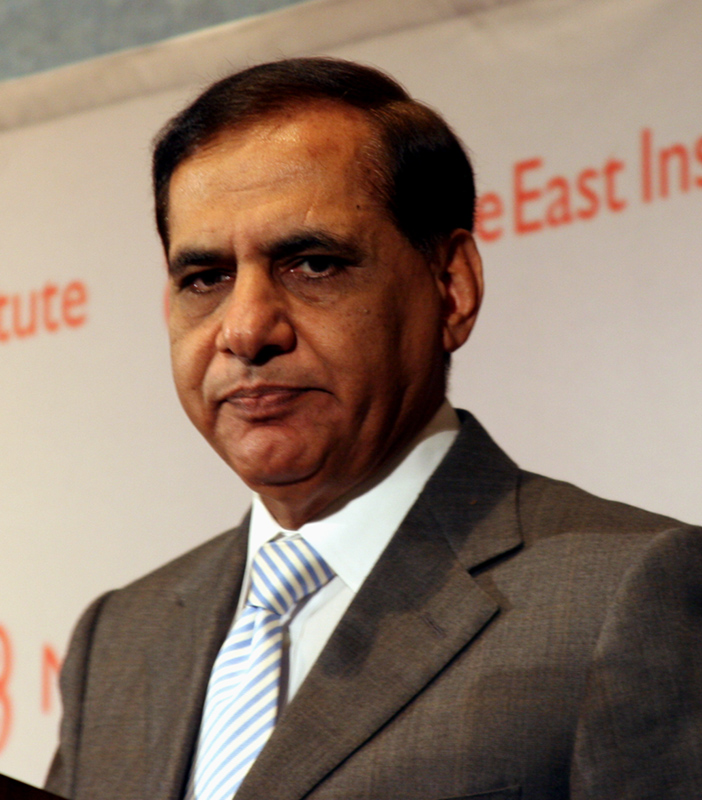
- Ehsan ul Haq, c. 2007

12th Chairman Joint Chiefs of Staff Committee
- In office 6 October 2004 – 7 October 2007
- Preceded by: Gen. Aziz Khan
- Succeeded by: Gen. Tariq Majid

Director General of the ISI
- In office 20 October 2001 – 5 October 2004
- Preceded by: Lt-Gen. Mahmud Ahmed
- Succeeded by: Lt-Gen. Ashfaq Pervez Kayani

Personal details
- Born: 22 September 1949 (age 77) Mardan, Khyber-Pakhtunkhwa, Pakistan
- Education: Pakistan Military Academy; National Defence University; Air Force Aviation University

Military service
- Allegiance: Pakistan
- Branch/service: Pakistan Army
- Years of service: 1967–2007
- Rank: General
- Unit: Air Defence Corps
- Commands: XI Corps, Peshawar; Air Defence Command; DG Military Intelligence; 16th Infantry Division in Pano Aqil; Pakistan Armed Forces–Middle East Command
- Battles/wars: Indo-Pakistani War of 1971; India–Pakistan Standoff 2001; War on terror; War in Afghanistan; Fall of Kabul; Battle of Tora Bora; War in North-West Pakistan; Battle of Wanna; Tribal war in Waziristan
- Awards: Nishan-e-Imtiaz (Military); Hilal-e-Imtiaz (Military); Order of King AbdulAziz; Légion d'honneur
- Service number: PA-5146

General Ehsan ul Haq NI(M), HI(M) (Urdu: احسان الحق; born 22 September 1949), is a retired four-star rank army general in the Pakistan Army and a public official, served as the 12th Chairman of the Joint Chiefs of Staff Committee, appointed in October 2005 until his retirement in 2007.

After retiring from his 40 years of military service, Ehsan ul Haq engaged in the corporate sector where he managed the businesses in the healthcare industry, and often offers his public speaking skills on the issues of foreign policy of Pakistan concerning the Arab League.

== Early life and education ==
Ehsan ul Haq was born in Mardan, Khyber-Pakhtunkhwa in Pakistan, into a Pashtun family on 22 September 1949. He was educated at the PAF Public School in Sargodha, a school under the administration of the Air Force Education Command, and matriculated in 1967.

After the war with India in 1971, he went to attend the National Defence University in Islamabad where he attained MSc in War Studies in 1977. In addition, Ehsan also went to attend the Command and Staff College in Quetta in 1977 where he was qualified as psc in 1980.

Ehsan was noted as a specialist in anti-aircraft warfare, having educated and graduated master's degree from the PLA Air Force Aviation University in Zhengzhou in China.

== Military career ==
=== Early career ===
He joined the Pakistan Army in 1967, and was directed to attend the Pakistan Military Academy (PMA) in Kakul where he passed out in the class of 41st PMA Long Course from the academy in 1969. 2nd-Lt. Ehsan was commissioned in the Army Air Defence Command, and serving in the Western front of the third war with India in 1971.

=== War and command appointments in the military ===
In 1977, Major Ehsan was posted with the Pakistan Armed Forces-Middle East Command where he first served as an instructor to the Iranian Air Force as an exchange officer until 1980. However, Maj. Ehsan left his instructing assignment Iranian IAF before the start of the Iran–Iraq War, and was posted with a command deputation to the Royal Saudi Air Defense which he served until 1983–84. In 1986, Ehsan went to the United States where he attended the United States Army's Logistics Management College in Fort Lee in Virginia and graduated from there in 1989.

In 1990, Brig. Ehsan commanded the 117th Infantry Brigade, later 46 AD Brigade and Deputy Military Secretary in GHQ until 1994 when he was promoted to two-star rank and commanded the 3rd Air Defence Division until 1996. Major-General Ehsan later took over the command of the 16th Infantry Division stationed in Pano Aqil in Sindh as its GOC which he commanded until 1996–97.

After the military takeover of the civilian government in 1999, Maj-Gen Ehsan was appointed as the Director-General of the Military Intelligence (DGMI) and took the command of the MI from then Maj-Gen Jamshed Gulzar Kiani, remaining in this position until April 2001.

In April 2001, Lieutenant-General Ehsan was posted as the field commander of the XI Corps stationed in Peshawar but remained in this command capacity until October 2001.

== DG-ISI (2001–04) ==
On 7 October 2001, Lt-Gen. Ehsan was surprisingly appointed as the Director-General of the Inter-Services Intelligence (DG ISI) as part of a major reshuffle that took place when President Pervez Musharraf went to dismissed his key army generals involved in the military takeover in 1999. His appointment was in response to the removal of the ISI director, Mahmud Ahmed, after the terrorist attacks took place in the United States in September 2001 which was followed by the American invasion of Afghanistan in October 2001.

About his reception and image, the American Defense Intelligence Agency (DIA) ran his profile in June 2002 that described him as holding "moderate Islamic views" and calls him a "protege" of President President Musharraf, saying the two men had a "strong relationship".

=== Political engineering and controlled democracy ===
Furthermore, he was described as "keenly aware of big picture issues with viewing of strong support for the democracy, advocating that Pakistan needs a legitimate civilian democratic government" and "open with American officials". According to the DIA, Ehsan believes that Pakistan's policy of engagement with the Taliban was to eventually moderate the Taliban's behavior. He played a crucial role in apprehending of the Omar Sheikh, a British terrorist and former MI-6 agent, from Karachi in 2002, and knew well aware of his status as the MI-6 agent as early as 1999.

In 2002, Ehsan politically engineered a centrist party under Shuja'at Hussain that opposing both the conservative PML(N) and the leftist PPP, and provided his agency's support to promote the Musharraf's mainstream agenda through the new political party in the political platform of the country.

He played a crucial role in dividing the two mainstream parties, the PML(N) being split towards the PML(Q) while the PPP forming the parliamentarians under Amin Fahim to fight off the pressure exerted by Lt-Gen. Ehsan. After the general elections held in 2002, the ISI under Ehsan remained politically active to provide political support to legitimize presidential elections in 2004.

In 2018, it was revealed by Urdu columnist, Mahmood Shaam, that Lt-Gen. Ehsan fiercely opposed the candidacy of Fazal-ur-Rehman and notably pressured the ARD alliance led by Benazir Bhutto and ultraconservative MMA to withdraw the latter's name in favor of Zafarullah Khan Jamali.

== Chairman joint chiefs (2004–07) ==
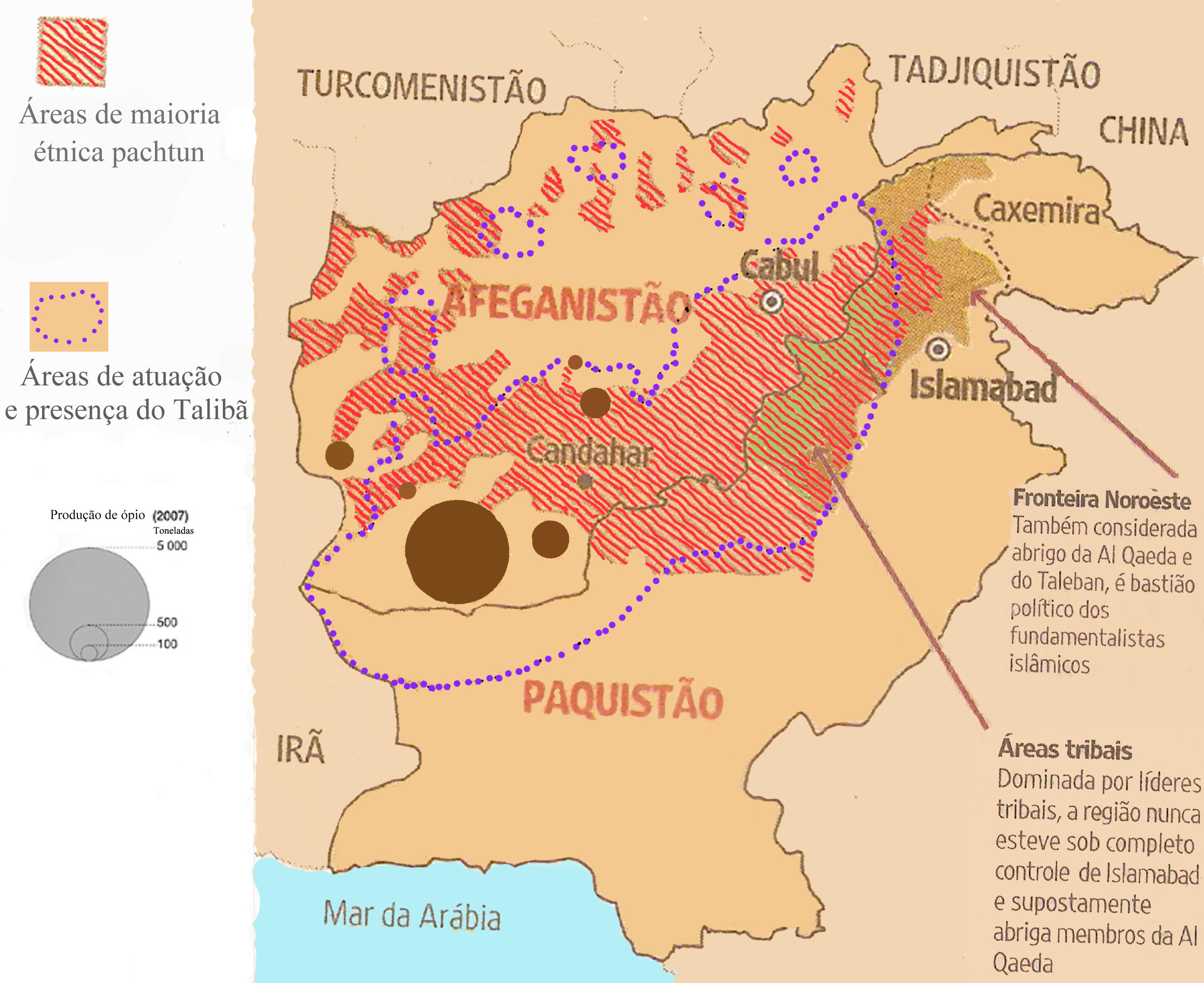
Taliban insurgency in 2009. Gen. Ehsan testified of his strategic failure to contain the Taliban to end the violence when the al-Qaeda eventually regroup itself and retreated from Pakistan.

In 2004, the Government of Pakistan confirmed the timely retirement of Gen. Aziz Khan as the Chairman joint chiefs, and eventually the race was thought be between Adm. Shahid Karim and the senior army generals in the Pakistan Army. In the army department alone, there were eight army generals who were in the race for the promotion of four-star rank appointment along with Adm. Shahid Karim, including with seniority:

1. Adm. Shahid Karim, Chief of Naval Staff headquartered in Islamabad.
2. Lt-Gen. Hamid Javaid, Principal Staff Officer to the Presidency in Islamabad.
3. Lt-Gen. Javed Hassan, Field commander of the XXX Corps based in Gujranwala, Punjab.
4. Lt-Gen. Munir Hafiez, Chairman of the National Accountability Bureau (NAB) in Islamabad.
5. Lt-Gen.l Ahsan Saleem Hyat, Field commander of the V Corps based in Karachi, Sindh.
6. Lt-Gen. Tariq Waseem Ghazi, President of National Defence University in Islamabad.
7. Lt-Gen. Muhammad Akram, Field Commander of the II Corps based in Multan, Punjab.
8. Lt-Gen. Syed Parwez Shahid, Field Commander of the XXXI Corps based in Bahawalpur, Punjab.
9. Lt-Gen. Ehsan ul Haq, Director-General of the Inter-Services Intelligence (DG ISI).

Despite his short-coming of his seniority and qualifications, President Musharraf announced to promote Lt-Gen. Ehsan to the four-star appointment and subsequently superseding the senior most Adm. Shahid Karim and eight senior army generals in the Pakistan Army on 7 October 2004. In the public circles and media, the appointment was commented as "backdrop of a controversy over President Musharraf's uniform and his continuing as army chief after 31 December 2004." Regardless, the appointment to four-star appointment was deemed as controversial by the political circles of the country.

On 18 December 2004, Gen. Ehsan was appointed as the first ever Colonel-in-Chief of the Army Air Defence Command. In 2005, Gen. Ehsan went to visit China to maintain defence ties in a view of strengthening the arms industry.

=== Appointment controversy and violence North-West Pakistan ===
As Chairman joint chiefs, he oversaw the troops deployment in tribal areas to end the violence and supported his plan and strategy to gain public support despite the reluctance from the United States in 2006. However, in 2007, Gen. Ehsan openly admitted when he testified his failure to end the violence and expulsion of Central Asian and Afghan Arabs in the country noting that, "the al-Qaeda and the Taliban militants used the 2006 peace agreement to regroup and carry out terrorist attacks in both Pakistan and Afghanistan."

== Post-retirement ==
=== Corporate business and healthcare activities ===
In 2007, Gen. Ehsan sought his retirement after his testimony in the Washington D.C. in United States and went to join the corporate world eventually becoming the CEO of the Pakistan–Libya Holding Company, an investment firm. He oversaw the company operations both in Libya and Pakistan but departed from the investment firm when the revolution took place in 2011, and subsequently went to join the healthcare industry in 2011.

He is currently serving as the Chairman of the Board of Governors of the Al-Shifa Trust, which runs a chain of eye care hospitals throughout Pakistan, while also managing the DNA Health Corporation, an American-based health company based in New York.

=== Public engagements ===
Ehsan continued to take an active interest in military and geopolitical matters after retiring from service, having delivered keynote addresses at forums such as the Institute of Strategic Studies Islamabad (ISSI) and the National Defence University (NDU). His speeches have addressed nuclear deterrence, counterterrorism, and regional strategic dynamics. He has also contributed to military doctrine discussions and policy briefings post-retirement, including closed-door consultations and white papers related to national security.

==== Gulf geopolitics ====
In 2017, Ehsan vehemently criticized the Nawaz administration over its strict neutrality, calling for supporting the military intervention by Saudi Arabia and United Arab Emirates in the Yemeni Civil War.

== Awards and decorations ==

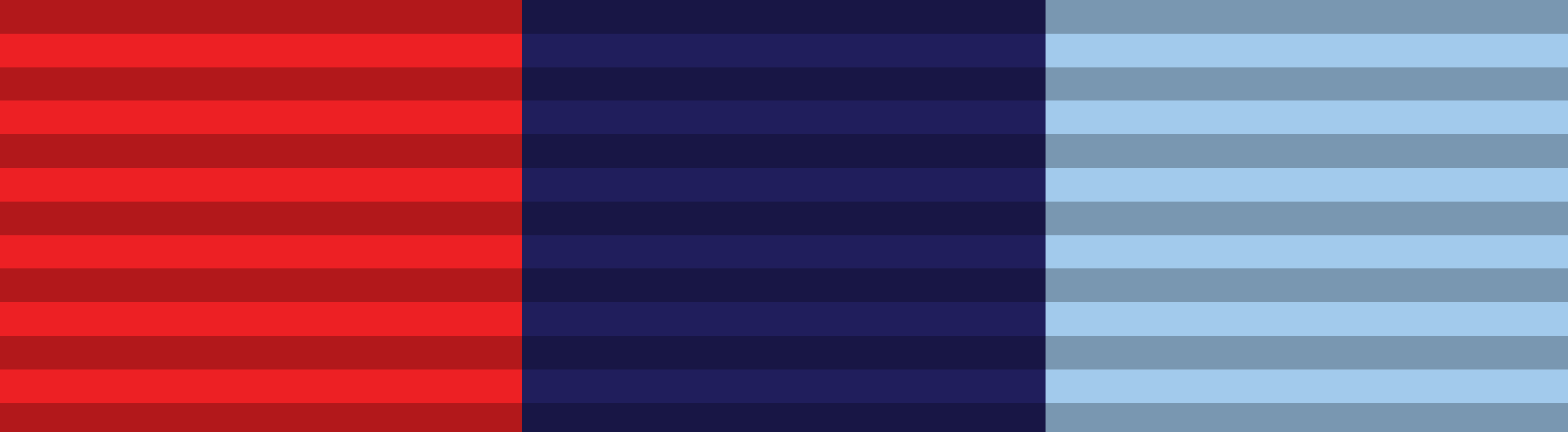

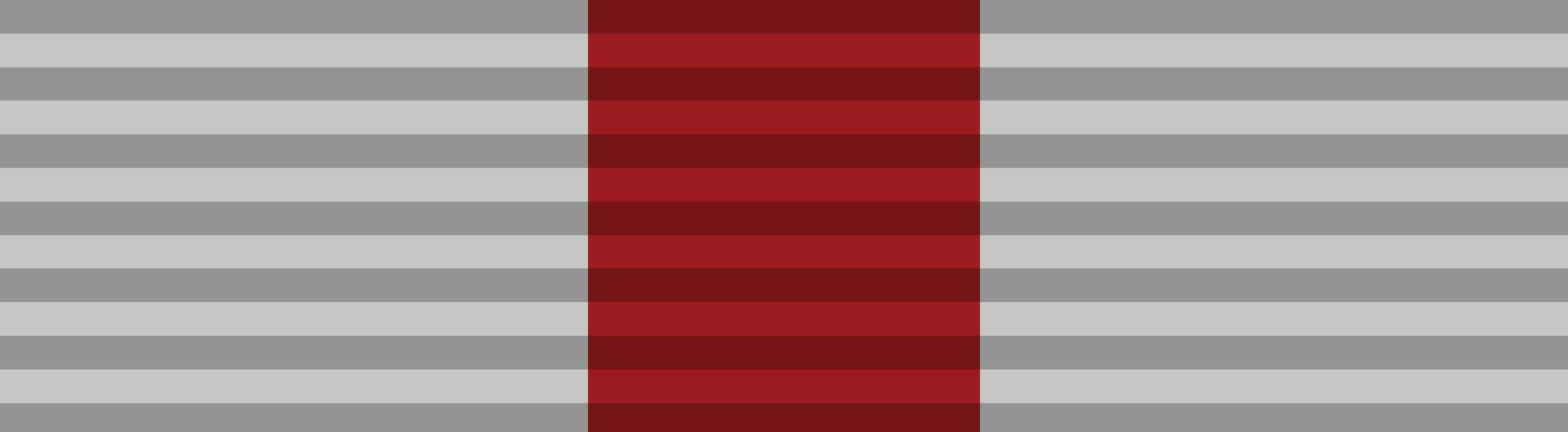

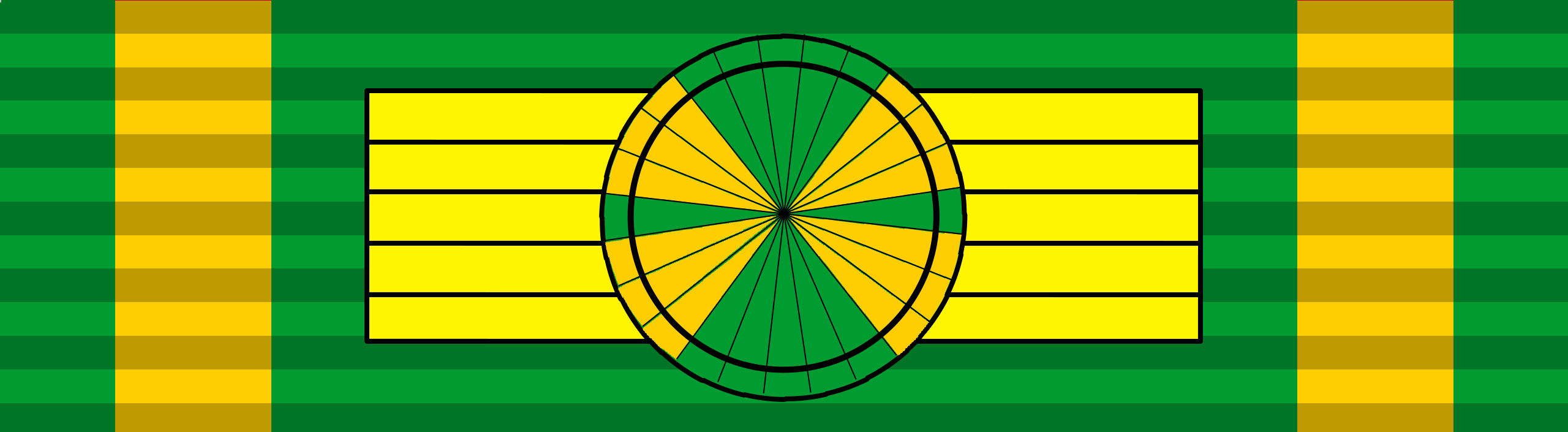

| Nishan-e-Imtiaz (Military) (Order of Excellence) | Hilal-e-Imtiaz (Military) (Crescent of Excellence) | | Sitara-e-Harb 1971 War (War Star 1971) |
| Tamgha-e-Jang 1971 War (War Medal 1971) | Tamgha-e-Baqa (Nuclear Test Medal) 1998 | Tamgha-e-Istaqlal Pakistan (Escalation with India Medal) 2002 | 10 Years Service Medal |
| 20 Years Service Medal | 30 Years Service Medal | 35 Years Service Medal | 40 Years Service Medal |
| Tamgha-e-Sad Saala Jashan-e- Wiladat-e-Quaid-e-Azam (100th Birth Anniversary of Muhammad Ali Jinnah) | Hijri Tamgha (Hijri Medal) 1979 | Jamhuriat Tamgha (Democracy Medal) 1988 | Qarardad-e-Pakistan Tamgha (Resolution Day Golden Jubilee Medal) 1990 |
| Tamgha-e-Salgirah Pakistan (Independence Day Golden Jubilee Medal) 1997 | Command and Staff College Quetta Centenary Student's Medal 2007 | Order of King Abdul Aziz (Class I) (Saudi Arabia) | Legion of Honour Officer Class (France) 2006 |

=== Foreign decorations ===
Foreign Awards
| Saudi Arabia | Order of King Abdul Aziz (Class I) |
| France | Légion d'honneur |

== See also ==
- Arab–Pakistan relations

== Notes ==
Military offices
| Preceded by Mahmud Ahmed | Director General of the Inter-Services Intelligence; 2001–2004 | Succeeded by Ashfaq Parvez Kayani |
| Preceded by Aziz Ahmed Khan | Chairman Joint Chiefs of Staff Committee; 2004–2007 | Succeeded by Tariq Majid |
