= Fiscal-military state =

One where military needs dominate fiscal policy

A fiscal-military state is a state that bases its economic model on the sustainment of its armed forces, usually in times of prolonged or severe conflict. Characteristically, fiscal-military states will subject citizens to high taxation for this purpose.

In the past, states such as Spain, the Netherlands and Sweden, which were embroiled in long-lasting periods of war for local or global hegemony, were organized as fiscal-military states. The British East India Company also employed military fiscalism in maintenance of rule in India during the mid-18th century. Colonial powers generated their revenue for the maintenance of the army.

== Historiography (Britain) ==
In British history the concept was popularised by John Brewer’s study of eighteenth-century Britain as a “fiscal-military” polity. Earlier eighteenth-century narratives already compiled fiscal and military data; for example, James Ralph’s The History of England, During the Reigns of King William, Queen Anne, and King George I (1744–46) appended customs and excise series, national-debt tables, and army/militia returns.

== See also ==
- War economy
- War effort
