= Tariq Pervez =

Pakistani civil servant

Tariq Parvez
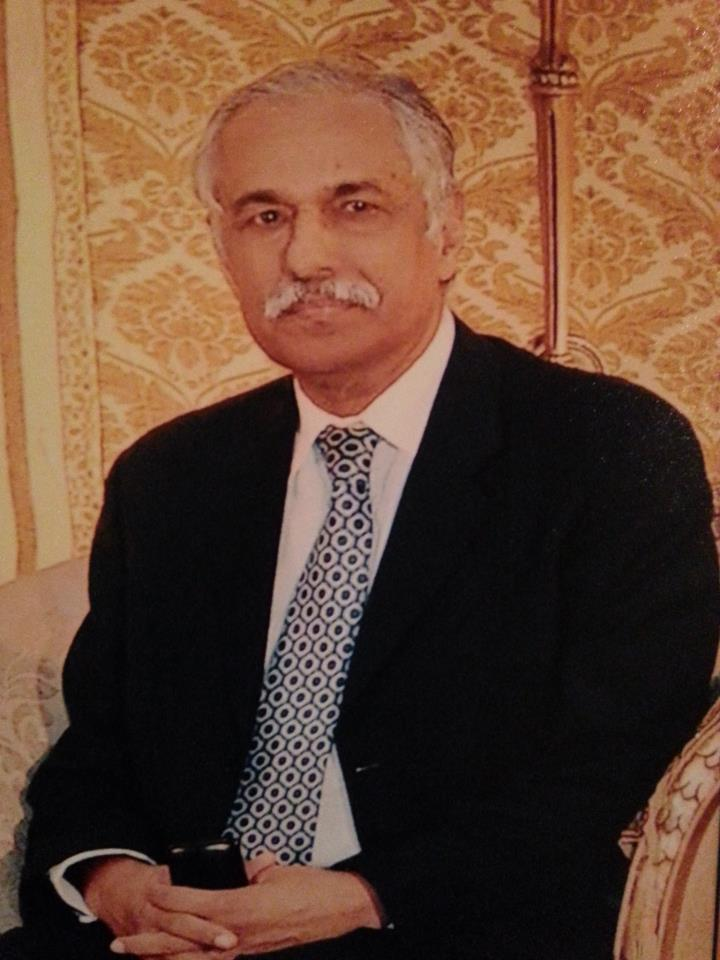
- Tariq Parvez

National Coordinator of the National Counter Terrorism Authority
- In office 1 January 2010 – 19 August 2010
- Preceded by: Office established
- Succeeded by: Zafarullah Khan

Director-General of the Federal Investigation Agency
- In office 1 October 2005 – 30 December 2008
- Preceded by: Mohib Asad
- Succeeded by: T. M. Khosa

Personal details
- Born: 30 December 1948 (age 77) Lahore, Punjab, Pakistan
- Citizenship: Pakistan
- Education: Government College University; Cardiff University
- Profession: Police Service of Pakistan
- Awards: Sitara-e-Imtiaz

Tariq Parvez (born 30 December 1948) is a Pakistani former Police officer and a bureaucrat who served as Home Minister in the Punjab government, only to oversee the general elections held in 2013. He began as a police officer and rose to become the director-general of Pakistan's Federal Investigation Agency from 2005 to 2008. After his retirement, he planned to engage in counterterrorism efforts and join a think-tank.

He Joined Police Service of Pakistan in the rank of Assistant Superintendent of Police in 1973 and retired in the rank of Inspector General of Police in 2008, from the post of Director General of Federal Investigation Agency, Pakistan. After retirement in 2008, was tasked to establish the National Counter Terrorism Authority (NACTA), Pakistan and appointed its first National Coordinator. In 2013, was appointed as Home Minister, Punjab in the caretaker set up. Presently member of NACTA's committee of experts as well as president, Advisory Board, National Initiative against Organized Crime, Pakistan, a non partisan, independent think tank, based in Lahore. Published a number of papers and reports on CT/CVE. Was member of Police Reforms Committee(PRC) set up, by Chief Justice, Supreme Court Pakistan within the purview of Law and Justice Commission Pakistan.

== Early life ==
Parvez completed his undergraduate and post-graduate studies from Government College University. Later he completed his MSc in criminology from Cardiff University and returned to Pakistan to serve the country.

== Career ==
Parvez was appointed the National Coordinator of the National Counter Terrorism Authority (NACTA). NACTA's function is to coordinate counterterrorism efforts between FIA, ISI and IB. He faced bureaucratic hurdles in getting the NACTA law draft passed from the Ministry of Interior and the Law Ministry, and eventually resigned over these ongoing obstacles. He officially resigned effective 21 July 2010.

During his tenure as head of CID Punjab he played a major role in eliminating their sectarian network in the 1990s.

During his FIA career, Parvez resolved several terrorist attacks, including suicide bombings in the wake of 9/11. He had a good reputation for integrity.

Under his stewardship, terrorists who had tried to assassinate former President Pervez Musharraf, and who were involved in the Islamabad Marriott Hotel bombing and other high-profile bombings, were traced. Moreover, he prepared a useful book of suspected terrorists.

He has been mentioned in the Pakistan national dailies DAWN, The News and Daily Times regularly and also in the foreign media such as The New York Times, TIME Magazine and also in the CTC Sentinel at West Point.

== Recognition ==
In 2004, he was awarded the Sitara-i-Imtiaz by the Government of Pakistan for his efforts in counter-terrorism.
