= Nishan-e-Imtiaz =

Highest civilian award of Pakistan

Nishan-e-Imtiaz نشانِ امتیاز
- Nishaani Imtiyaaz (Order of Excellence), 3rd class (1956–present)

Awarded by The President of Pakistan
- Type: Award
- Eligibility: Pakistani or Foreign citizen
- Awarded for: Service to the state
- Status: Currently constituted
- Sovereign: President of Pakistan
- Grades: 5 grades: Star (1st Class); Badge (Second Class); Ribbon (military only); Collar Chain (4th class); Medal (5th Class) (Note: It is usually given all together. Only Military officers from Pakistan Defence Forces are awarded the ribbon which is attached to their respected uniform.)

Statistics
- First induction: 19 March 1957
- Total inductees: 34

Precedence
- Next (higher): None
- Next (lower): Hilal-e-Imtiaz
- Nishan-e-Imtiaz (Civilian) Nishan-e-Imtiaz (Military)

The Nishan-e-Imtiaz (Urdu: نشانِ امتیاز, lit. 'Order of Excellence'; pronounced [nɪ.ʃɑː.nɪ ɪm.t̪ɪ.jɑːz]) is one of the state organized civil decorations of Pakistan. It is awarded for achievements towards world recognition for Pakistan or outstanding service for the country. However, the award is not limited to citizens of Pakistan and, while it is a civilian award, it can also be awarded to military personnel and worn on the uniform. Nishan, translating as decoration/order/mark, is a highly restricted and prestigious award, roughly equivalent to Presidential Medal of Freedom (United States) and Order of the British Empire (United Kingdom), and is the first category award of Order of Imtiaz. The other three descending categories are Hilal-i-Imtiaz, Sitara-i-Imtiaz and Tamgha-e-Imtiaz. Usually, it is regarded as the highest award one can achieve in Pakistan since the higher award Nishan-e-Pakistan is awarded only to foreign Heads of States.

The Nishan-e-Imtiaz was established on 19 March 1957, following the proclamation of Pakistan as a parliamentary republic, by the 1956 Constitution. The award is the top decoration in the country, given to a person who has accomplished duty beyond what is assigned to them. The person has to show eminence and be outstanding in providing excellent service in a significant field of activity.

The award may be bestowed posthumously and may also be awarded to an individual more than once, though it has not been awarded twice since 1999. Nishan-i-Imtiaz is an honour given by the Government of Pakistan to both the military officers of the Pakistan Armed Forces and civilians who have outstanding contributions that prompted world recognition of Pakistan. For civilians, it is awarded for distinguished merit, honouring their excellence in their respective fields of literature, arts, sports, medicine, or science. The award is usually given to individuals not groups because the purpose of the award is to recognise individual excellence.

For those in the military it is given after distinguished service and is also the highest award that can be awarded to those at the rank of Generals (Army), Air Chief Marshals (Air Force), and Admirals of the Navy, Coast Guard, and Marines.

The Parliament of Pakistan's committee for the Award and Recognition of Services for the State of Pakistan, selects individuals and sends a final report to the Prime minister of Pakistan. On the advice of the Prime Minister, the President organizes a ceremony that is telecast and broadcast nationally.

This award ceremony is held once in a year, nominees are announced on Independence Day and the ceremony takes place on Pakistan Day in the Presidential Palace. Nishan-i-Imtiaz is awarded to the nominees by the President of Pakistan in a public ceremony.

The badge of the Nishan-e-Imtiaz is in the form of a pure golden star with light-white enamel, with well polished green emerald circumference to the inside the golden star. Written in gold words around the green emerald, it reads as نشان امتیاز. A golden Jasminum stands between the point of the star. It is worn around the neck with a yellow, bright yellow and white ribbon (for civilians) or bright green and white ribbon (for military officers) with white edge stripes.

A special grade of the award has a larger execution of the same medal design worn as a star on the left chest. In addition, it is worn as a sash on the right shoulder, with its rosette (yellow with white (for civilians) or green (military officers only) with white and yellow edge, bearing the disc of the medal at its center, resting on the left hip. At ceremonies, both medals can be worn at the same time.

For military officers, the medal is accompanied by a ribbon bar for wearing on military uniform, a miniature medal pendant for wearing on mess uniform, and a lapel badge for wearing on civilian clothes.

== See also ==
- Nishan-e-Haider
- Nishan-e-Pakistan
- Civil decorations of Pakistan
- Awards and decorations of the Pakistan Armed Forces
- Government of Pakistan
- Pakistan Armed Forces
