= Operation Koh-e-Sufaid =

Military operation in Kurram Agency, KPK, Pakistan

- Part of the War in North-West Pakistan
| Date | 4 July – 18 August 2011 (1 month and 2 weeks) |
| Location | Kurram Agency, Khyber-Pakhtunkhwa Province, Pakistan |
| Result | Pakistani victory |

Belligerents
| Pakistan: Pakistan Army | Tehrik-i-Taliban Pakistan |

Commanders and leaders
| Ashfaq Parvez Kayani | Hakimullah Mehsud |

Operation Koh-e-Sufaid (Urdu: کوہ سفید; Pashto: کوه صوفید) was an operation led by Pakistani forces in the Kurram Agency in 2011. The operation took place from 4 July to 18 August 2011. The main goal of the operation was to destroy Taliban structures in the Kurram Agency and to secure the Thall-Parachinar transit route. On 18 August 2011, Pakistan Army officially declared victory of operation. On the same day, General Kayani visited the Upper Kurram to celebrate the victory of campaign. The operation was a success for the Pakistani Army and it led to the elimination of Taliban structures in Kurram. The writ of Government of Pakistan was restored in entire Kurram till Afghanistan-Pakistan border.

== Etymology ==
The Operation was codenamed after Koh-e-Sufaid range of mountains, also known as white mountains or Spin Ghar located on Afghanistan-Pakistan border.

Militants had occupied mountains of Koh-e-Sufaid range which were as high as 15000 feet. These mountains covered with heavy snow served as hideout of various militant organizations, most prominently Al-Qaeda. The Tora Bora cave which was home to Osama Bin Laden for years after its escape from Afghanistan was also located in these mountains.

== Background ==
Operation was part of series of military campaigns that Pakistan Armed Forces conducted against Islamic militants occupying Federally Administered Tribal Areas since 2002. After 9/11 attacks and subsequent US invasion of Afghanistan various foreign Islamic militant groups fled Afghanistan and sought safe havens into neighbouring lawless tribal regions of Pakistan across Pakistan-Afghanistan border. The militants occupied 7 tribal agencies of FATA and eroded writ of Government of Pakistan by 2004. The foreign militants such as Al-Qaeda and Islamic Movement of Uzbekistan along with local jihadi militants established Tehreek Taliban Pakistan in 2007. The TTP initiated a full blown insurgency in North-West Frontier Provinces.

Responding to the militancy, Pakistan Armed Forces launched bloody campaign to reoccupy lost territories. Operations such as Operation Al-Mizan, Rah-e-Haq, Zalzala, Sherdil, and Operation Khwakh Ba De Sham were launched in different agencies and districts of North-West Pakistan to reestablish government's control on wrested territories under militant control.

Operation Khwakh Ba De Sham preceded the Operation Koh-e-Sufaid. Under Operation Khwakh Ba De Sham Pakistan Armed Forces reoccupied Orakzai Agency and major bulk of Kurram Agency.

However, militants continued to pose threat to the region by maintaining strong presence in mountainous Central, Upper Kurram. Militants had also occupied mountains of Koh-e-Sufaid range which were as high as 15000 feet from where they launched score of attacks on vital link of Thall-Parachinar road, which was only land route connecting Kurram with Pakistan.

In order to consolidate gains of Operation Khwakh Ba De Sham, reoccupy remaining parts of Kurram Agency, and flush out militants from Koh-e-Sufaid, Pakistan Military under command COAS Ashfaq Parvez Kayani launched Operation Koh-e-Sufaid.

The Operation was named after Koh-e-Sufaid range of mountains, also known as white mountains located on Afghanistan-Pakistan border.

== Results ==
On 18 August 2011, Pakistan Army officially declared victory of operation. General Kayani himself reached Upper Kurram to celebrate victory of Operation. The Operation considered to be major success as Pakistani forces first time since 2002 reestablished government control on Kurram Agency till Afghanistan-Pakistan border. The militant territorial control after Koh-e-Sufaid were confined to North-Waziristan and Khyber.

Pakistan Armed Forces launched Operation Khyber, Zarb-e-Azb and Radd-ul-Fasaad to reoccupy remaining territories. By mid-2017, government reestablished writ over whole of the FATA. In 2017 Government started to fence Pakistan-Afghanistan border due to which subsequent reduction in terrorist activity was seen.
