= Vice Chief of the Army Staff =

Vice Chief of the Army Staff may refer to:

- Vice Chief of the Army Staff (India), the second highest ranking army officer
- Vice Chief of the Army Staff (Pakistan), the second-in-command of the army

== See also ==
- Vice Chief of Staff of the United States Army, the second highest ranking army officer
- Deputy Chief of the Army Staff (disambiguation)
