= Deputy Chief of the Army Staff =

Deputy Chief of the Army Staff (DCOAS) may refer to:

- Deputy Chief of the Army Staff (India), the third highest ranking army officer.
- Deputy Chief of the Army Staff (Australia), the second highest ranking army officer.
- Deputy Chief of the Army Staff (Pakistan), former third highest ranking army officer.
- Deputy Chief of Army Staff (Bangladesh)

== See also ==
- Vice Chief of the Army Staff (disambiguation)
- Deputy Chief of the Air Staff (disambiguation)
- Deputy Chief of the Naval Staff (disambiguation)
