= K. M. Arif =

2nd Pakistani Vice Chief of Army Staff (1930–2020)

K. M. Arif NI(M) SBt
- کم عارف

2nd Vice Chief of Army Staff
- In office 23 March 1984 – 29 March 1987
- President: General Zia-ul-Haq
- Preceded by: General Sawar Khan
- Succeeded by: General Mirza Aslam Beg

Personal details
- Born: Khalid Mahmud Arif; 29 December 1930 Jalandhar, East Punjab, British India
- Died: 6 March 2020 (aged 89) Lahore, Pakistan
- Spouse: Khalida (m. 1955; died 2015)
- Education: Officers Training School; United States Army Armor School
- Occupation: Military historian

Military service
- Branch/service: Pakistan Army
- Years of service: 1949–1987
- Rank: General
- Unit: 11th Cavalry (Frontier Force)
- Commands: Vice Chief of Army Staff; Military Intelligence; 111th Infantry Brigade
- Battles/wars: Indo-Pakistani War of 1965; Indo-Pakistan War of 1971; Operation Searchlight; Operation Fair Play; Operation Sentinel; Kirana-I
- Awards: See list

Khalid Mahmud Arif (Note: Urdu: خالد محمود عارف) (29 December 1930 – 6 March 2020) better known as K. M. Arif, was a four-star rank general of the Pakistan Army, who served as the Vice Chief of Army Staff under President General Zia-ul-Haq from 1984 to 1987 and was considered one of his closest confidants.

An intelligence assessment made by the Central Intelligence Agency (CIA) in 1982 on who would succeed General Zia-ul-Haq in the event of his death mentioned Arif as one of the generals who may succeed him: "A darkhorse candidate is Lt. Gen. K. M. Arif, who runs the federal bureaucracy through the martial law secretariat, where he serves as chief of staff to Zia in the latter's role as Chief Martial Law Administrator. Arif is regarded as the most skilled bureaucratic player in Islamabad. He wants a corps command, and he recently tried unsuccessfully to resign as Zia's chief of staff. He has also supported negotiations between the martial law administration and the opposition political parties."

His career in the army was mostly spent in the military intelligence, and served in the East Pakistan Rifles, briefly fighting in the war in East Pakistan aided by neighboring India. Upon repatriation to Pakistan in 1973, he continued with his military service in the army and eventually ascended as director-general of military intelligence before assuming the staff appointment at the Army GHQ. Appointed as vice-chief of army staff in 1984, he played crucial role in stabilizing the administration of President Zia-ul-Haq, and was succeeded by General Mirza Aslam Beg as army chief in March 1987.

Upon his retirement in 1987, he authored several books on the political and military history of Pakistan, of which Working With Zia: Pakistan's Power Politics is the best known.

== Early life and education ==
Khalid Mahmud Arif was born into a Kakazai family of Pashtun descent on 29 December 1930 in Jullundur to Akbar Hussain.

He attended Edwardes College in Peshawar and graduated in 1947.

== Military career ==
He joined the 1st Course of the Officers Training School in Kohat as a cadet on 17 March 1949. His family permanently moved to Kohat as he gained commission into the Armoured Corps. In 1952, he was selected for further military training in the United States and was sent to attend the United States Army Armor School at Fort Knox, where he graduated in specializing in the armoured tactics. He was further educated in Military College of Signals in Rawalpindi where he excelled in intelligence management, and graduated from Staff College, Quetta.

=== War appointments and in East Pakistan ===
In 1965, Arif, as a Major, served in the armoured corps along with then-Lieutenant Colonel Zia-ul-Haq and participated in the second war with India over the disputed Kashmir. Arif commanded an American M48 tank Squadron against the Indian Army.

After the war, he was sent back to the military intelligence and stationed in East Pakistan (in the East Pakistan Rifles).

Promoted to Lieutenant Colonel in 1967, he greatly aided towards troop redeployment of the Eastern Command in formulating a battle plan, codename: "Operation X-Sunderbans-1." The deployment, however, was non combative and it was only designed to form the basis for the operational combat plan.

Lieutenant Colonel Arif commanded the Punjab Cavalry from 7 January 1968 to 6 January 1969.

In 1969, he was posted in Dhaka as a martial law officer under the Government of East Pakistan led by Governor Vice Admiral S. M. Ahsan in 1969. During this stint, Arif reportedly relied a secretive message in his complied report in regards to the situation in East that ultimately warned off the consequences of the civil war.

In March 1971, he was promoted to full Colonel and witnessed the meeting with President Yahya Khan who decided the launch of the military operations against the rebels in the East should take place. Arif took over the situation himself to control the law and order.

About this meeting, Arif described the meeting as: President Yahya took matters in his hands, thus good bye to civil bureaucracy. In East, he fought and led an Infantry Battalion to fight the approaching Indian Army, and was captured by the Indian Army units who held him as war prisoner after the instrument of surrender was signed between Lieutenant General A.A.K. Niazi and Lieutenant General Jagjit Singh Aurora, GOC-in-C of Eastern Command of Indian military in 1971.

=== Command and staff appointments ===
In the 1970s, Major General Arif was the Chief of Staff to President General Zia-ul-Haq.

His efforts and actions in the liberation war in East that accounted his bravery had earned admiration in Pakistan which led to Prime Minister Zulfikar Ali Bhutto accepting recommendations to decorate Major Arif with service award, Sitara-e-Basalat. In 1973, he was repatriated to Pakistan from the Wagha and was allowed to resume his military service. He testified in the War Enquiry Commission led by Chief Justice Hamoodur Rahman, giving accounts of military intelligence failures took place in East.

In 1976, he was promoted as Brigadier. In 1977, he assumed the command of the 111th Brigade stationed in Islamabad; this command appointment lasted only eight months.

The general elections held in 1977 saw the victory of Pakistan Peoples Party led by Zulfikar Ali Bhutto, caused the public agitation led by the conservative alliance whose politicians refused to accept the results amid alleged vote rigging. Brig. K. M. Arif ultimately leaked and informed Prime Minister Bhutto of covert coup d'état took place under his appointed-army chief General Zia-ul-Haq, but the latter refused to believe him. Acting upon warnings by Brig. Arif, Bhutto did accept all demands by the conservative alliance but the coup d'état had already took place.

After receiving orders from Lieutenant-General F.A. Chishti, GoC-in-C of X Corps, Brigadier Arif rotated the 111th Brigade to take control of the civilian government in support of Chief of Army Staff General Zia-ul-Haq and Chairman joint chiefs Mohammad Shariff. After the coup d'état was completed, General Zia's promoted Brigadier Arif as Major-General and appointed him as Director-General of Military Intelligence (DGMI).

In a views of Lieutenant-General Chishti who noted: "General Zia was lucky to have Major-General Arif as his life long confidante. He had experience as a Martial Law Officer during General's Yahya's regime and handled matters efficiently."

In 1979, he helped and aided in preparing a national security strategy against the Russian invasion of Afghanistan, after a meeting with President Zia-ul-Haq upon the latter's request.

=== Vice Chief of Army Staff (1984–87) ===
A quintessential staff officer, Major-General Arif's career accelerated and gained reputation as an effective commander in the military intelligence. Major-General Arif served in the military intelligence until 1983 when he promoted as Lieutenant-General and posted in a staff assignment in the Army GHQ. At the Army GHQ, he brought most qualified officers who had worked with him in the past assignments, and built up his reputation in army as an effective leader. On 11 March 1983, Lieutenant-General Arif, along with Chairman Senate Ghulam Ishaq Khan, was invited by Munir Ahmad Khan, then-Chairman of PAEC, to witnessed the subcritical testing of an atomic device that took place in a hidden weapons-testing sites.

Despite never effectively commanding the field assignments, he was named and appointed as Vice Chief of Army Staff under President Zia in 1984. Upon being promoted to four-star rank army general, he assumed the command of Pakistan Army as its Vice-Chief of Army Staff under President Zia.

To many observers, this promotion, in fact, made General Arif the chief of army staff of the Pakistan Army with the entire commanding staff reporting to him.

As an army chief, General Arif played a crucial role towards the successful implementation of the secretive atomic bomb programme after removing the civilian administrator, Mubashir Hassan. Towards diplomacy with the United States, General Arif made frequent trips with United States, successfully convincing the Reagan administration to allow the secretive atomic bomb development by making it very clear to the United States that "[Pakistan] won't compromise on its nuclear weapons programme, but won't conduct a test to harm to relationship between two nations." In 1983, the Central Intelligence Agency (CIA) placed a mole near the Kahuta Research Laboratories but was thwarted by the ISI, which according to General Arif, the ISI took the mole to its secret museum to train its own spies in espionage operations. He was described as a very uptight and strict army officer by civilian scientists, specifically dr. Abdul Qadeer Khan in his memoirs, did not compromise on his morals and disciplines throughout his career.

In 1984, General Arif's tenure also saw the commissioning of the Bell AH-1 Cobra Attack helicopters in the aviation corps.

In 1986–87, he deployed and rotated the V Corps, with support from the Southern Air Command to deter the Indian Army's major military exercise that took place near Pakistan's border under supervision of General Sundarji, then-army chief of Indian Army. During this time, he refuted the claims made by dr. A.Q. Khan and immediately issued directives towards the policy of deliberate ambiguity over the clandestine atomic bomb programme.

== Post-retirement ==
In 1987, General Arif sought retirement from his military service.

Upon retiring, he focused on poetry and became a military historian when he authored the notable eye witnessed and famed text on the military interference led General Zia-ul-Haq, Working with Zia, published in 1995. In 2001, he published Khaki Shadows: Pakistan 1947–1997, about the politics, government, and armed forces of Pakistan during and shortly after the Cold War.

In 1991, Arif and foreign minister Agha Shahi went on a goodwill tour of India.

In 2010, he authored another book, Estranged Neighbours: India, Pakistan (1947-2010) on the foreign relations of India and Pakistan. In the book, he criticised Nawaz Sharif for politicising bureaucrats in Punjab and wrote: "A new group of senior civil servants emerged on the administrative horizon of the country. Such favoured super bureaucrats overshadowed efficient colleagues who were less known to ruling prime ministers."

== Views on nuclear weapons ==
Arif often changed his views on nuclear weapons, sometimes opposing or sometimes agreeing. At a meeting titled "Security Assurances for non-Nuclear Weapon States" chaired by Chinese strategist and disarmament negotiator Zhai Dequan, General Arif dismissed the concept of security assurances as useless and said "we do not need non-proliferation but elimination of nuclear weapons."

However in 1989, he said "Pakistan's national interest demands that her nuclear programme be expanded and taken to its logical conclusions to produce the ultimate weapon.

== Death ==
Arif died on 6 March 2020.

== Awards and decorations ==

	Nishan-e-Imtiaz (Military) (Order of Excellence)		
Hilal-i-Imtiaz (Military) (Crescent of Excellence)	Sitara-i-Imtiaz (Military) (Star of Excellence)	Sitara-e-Basalat (Star of Valour)	Sitara-e-Harb 1965 War (War Star 1965)
Sitara-e-Harb 1971 War (War Star 1971)	Tamgha-e-Jang 1965 War (War Medal 1965)	Tamgha-e-Jang 1971 War (War Medal 1971)	Pakistan Tamgha (Pakistan Medal) 1947
Tamgha-e-Sad Saala Jashan-e-Wiladat-e-Quaid-e-Azam (100th Birth Anniversary of Muhammad Ali Jinnah) 1976	Tamgha-e-Qayam-e-Jamhuria (Republic Commemoration Medal) 1956	Hijri Tamgha (Hijri Medal) 1979	Legion of Merit (Degree of Commander) (US)

=== Foreign decorations ===
Foreign Awards
US	Legion of Merit (Degree of Commander)

== Works ==
- K. M. Arif (1995). Working with Zia: Pakistan Power Politics, 1977-1988. Oxford University Press. ISBN 978-0-19-577570-9.
- Khaki Shadows: Pakistan 1947–1997. Oxford University Press. 2001. ISBN 978-0-19-579396-3.
- Estranged Neighbours: India, Pakistan, 1947-2010. Islamabad: Dost Publications. 2010. ISBN 978-969-496-382-2.

== Notes ==
Military offices
Preceded by Sawar Khan	Vice Chief of Army Staff (Pakistan); 1984 – 1987	Succeeded by Mirza Aslam Beg
