= Muzaffar Hussain Usmani =

Pakistani military Officer (1945-2020)

Lieutenant General Muzaffar Hussain Usmani HI(M)
- Born: 1945; Muradabad, India
- Died: 1 October 2020 (aged 74–75); Karachi, Pakistan
- Military career
- Allegiance: Pakistan
- Branch: Pakistan Army
- Service years: 1966 — 2001
- Rank: Lieutenant General
- Unit: 10th Frontier Force
- Commands: V Corps; XXXI Corps
- Awards: Hilal-i-Imtiaz

Muzaffar Hussain Usmani was a three star general of the Pakistan Army, who served as the only Deputy Chief of the Army Staff.

== Early life ==
Usmani was born in 1945 in Muradabad, India. His family had migrated to Pakistan following Independence of Pakistan. He graduated from the St. Patrick's High School, Karachi.

== Military career ==
Usmani was commissioned in the 10th Frontier Force Regiment in 1966.

He served as Vice Chief of General Staff at General Headquarters. As a three star general, he commanded the XXXI Corps. Later, he served as Corps Commander V Corps.

While his tenure as Commander V Corps, he had taken part in a bloodless coup. The then Prime Minister Nawaz Sharif had dismissed Pervez Musharraf as COAS and appointed Ziauddin Butt. Musharraf, who coming from a visit to Sri Lanka, was denied to land.

Reportedly, Sharif ordered Pakistan Civil Aviation Authority to divert Musharraf's plane to India, but it was eventually rerouted to Shaheed Benazirabad. When the pilot did not comprehend the situation, the Civil Aviation Authority shut down the runways by turning off the runway edge lights at Jinnah International Airport to block the landing.

Under the leadership of Lt. Gen. Iftikhar, pakistani troops had sealed the airport and had taken over the control tower. Usmani contacted Musharraf and later made his aircraft land safely at the airport.

Following the coup, Usmani was appointed as the Deputy Chief of the Army Staff. He was the only person in history to hold this appointment so far. However, Usmani was reportedly removed shortly after the 1999 coup. His removal came suddenly, hours before the U.S. air strikes on Afghanistan in 2001, as part of a military reshuffle amid post 9/11 tensions.
