= Ashfaq Parvez Kayani =

Pakistani general

Ashfaq Parvez Kayani NI(M) HI(C) HI(M) OMM
- اشفاق پرویز کیانی
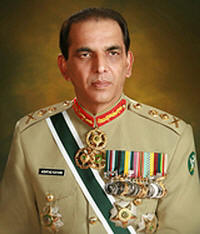
- Official portrait
- Born: Ashfaq Pervez Kayani; 20 April 1952 (age 74); Gujar Khan, Punjab, Pakistan
- Education: Military College Jhelum; Pakistan Military Academy; Command and Staff College; US Army Command and General Staff College; National Defence University
- Military career
- Allegiance: Pakistan
- Branch: Pakistan Army
- Service years: 1971–2013
- Rank: General
- Nicknames: Kayani; The thinking General; Quiet General
- Unit: 5th Baloch
- Commands: Vice Chief of Army Staff; Director-General Military Operations; X Corps in Rawalpindi; GOC 12th Infantry Division, Murree; Mil Secy to First Benazir Ministry
- Conflicts: Indo-Pakistani wars and conflicts; Bangladesh Liberation War; Indo-Pakistani War of 1971; Indo-Pakistani standoff (2001); Indo-Pakistani standoff (2008); Indo-Pakistani skirmish (2011); Indo–Pakistani skirmish (2013); War on terror; War in Afghanistan; Pakistan–United States skirmishes; War in North-West Pakistan; Operation Rah-e-Haq; Operation Zalzala; Battle of Bajaur; Operation Sirat-e-Mustaqeem; Operation Black Thunderstorm; Operation Rah-e-Rast; Orakzai and Kurram offensive; Operation Koh-e-Sufaid; Mohmand offensive; Operation Rah-e-Nijat; Khyber Pass offensive; Operation Janbaz; Operation Rah-e-Shahadat
- Awards: Nishan-e-Imtiaz (Military); Hilal-e-Imtiaz (Civilian); Hilal-e-Imtiaz (Military); Turkish Legion of Merit; Order of King Abdulaziz; Legion of Merit; Legion of Honour; Order of Military Merit; Tajikistan Medal

Ashfaq Parvez Kayani NI(M) HI(C) HI(M) OMM (Urdu: اشفاق پرویز کیانی ; born 20 April 1952), is a retired four-star general of the Pakistan Army who served as the eighth chief of army staff, being appointed on 29 November 2007 after his predecessor Pervez Musharraf retired from his military service and remained in the office until 29 November 2013.

Initially appointed as Vice Chief of Army Staff (VCOAS) under then-President Pervez Musharraf on 8 October 2007, he formally took over the command of the army when President Pervez Musharraf retired from his military service on 29 November 2007. In addition, General Kayani served as the Director-General of the Inter-Services Intelligence (ISI) and as director of the Directorate-General of Military Operations (DGMO), overseeing major war efforts in the war on terror. On 24 July 2010, Kayani's tenure was extended for three more years by Prime Minister Yousaf Raza Gillani to continue the war efforts against the insurgent outfits.

Forbes named him the world's 34th most powerful person in 2011 and the world's 28th most powerful person in 2012.

== Early life and education ==
Ashfaq Parvez Kayani was born at Manghot, Punjab, on 20 April 1952, in a family belonging to the Kayani Ghakar tribe of the Punjab's Pothohar Plateau. The town of Manghot is situated on the Pothohar Plateau in northern Punjab bounded on the east by the Jhelum River, on the west by the Indus River. Ashfaq's father was a Junior commissioned officer (JCO) in the Pakistan Army as Subedar major.

His humble background as the son of a JCO has endeared him to the junior ranks of the army. After attending a local high school, Ashfaq successfully enrolled in the Military College Jhelum, Sarai Alamgir and made a transfer to Pakistan Military Academy in Kakul where he graduated with a bachelor's degree in 1971 in his class of 45th PMA Long Course.

== Military career ==
=== 1971 war experience ===
Kayani was commissioned as 2nd Lieutenant in the 5th Battalion of the famed Baloch Regiment on 29 August 1971. He actively participated and joined the military in the time of 1971 war with Bangladesh.

=== Academia and professorship ===
After the war, Ashfaq continued to resume his studies and became more involved with his studies after joining the Command and Staff College in Quetta. After his graduation, Kayani departed to the United States on deputation and educated at the United States Army Command and General Staff College at Fort Leavenworth and the United States Army Infantry School at Fort Benning. After graduating from the military institutions in the United States, Ashfaq returned to Pakistan and attained his Master of Science in War studies from the National Defence University.

During his long military career, Ashfaq has been on the faculty of School of Infantry and Tactics, also in Quetta. Ashfaq briefly taught war courses at the Command and Staff College in Quetta and later moved on to accepting the professorship of strategic studies and joined the teaching faculty at the National Defence University in Islamabad.

=== Staff and command appointments ===
As a Lt Col, Gen Kayani commanded 30 Baloch Regiment. As a Brigadier, he commanded an Infantry Brigade. As a Brigadier, he also served as Benazir Bhutto's Military Secretary. Upon his promotion to two-star rank, Major-General Kayani served as the general officer commanding of the 12th Infantry Division stationed in Murree, deployed all over the LoC region and which comes under the X Corps. In 2000, Kayani was moved and appointed as the director of the Directorate–General of Military Operations (DGMO). In 2001, it was during his tenure as DGMO that the intense military standoff between Pakistan and India took place. Reportedly, Kayani only slept a few hours a night during that period as he diligently oversaw the unified armed forces mobilisation and preparedness on the border.

In September 2003, Kayani's promotion to three-star assignment was approved by the President Musharraf and subsequently elevating him to three-star rank, Lieutenant-General. The same year, he was appointed as the field operational commander of the X Corps in Rawalpindi. The promotion indicated Musharraf's significant trust in Kayani, since chief of army staff cannot build a military coup without the help of the X Corps commander. Kayani led the X Corps until October 2004, when he was transferred to the ISI as its director-general.

During Kayani's tenure at the X Corps, he led the successful investigation of the two back-to-back suicide attacks against Musharraf in December 2003. It is believed that Kayani won the trust of Musharraf after the investigation, and a prelude to Kayani's appointment as the sensitive position of ISI chief. He was awarded Hilal-e-Imtiaz, the civilian medal, for his achievement.

== Intelligence career ==
=== Directorship of Inter-Services Intelligence ===
In October 2004, Lieutenant-General Ashfaq Kayani was appointed as the director general of Directorate of Inter-Services Intelligence (ISI), in place of General Ehsan-ul-Haq, who was promoted as the Chairman of the Joint Chiefs of Staff Committee. General Kayani directed the ISI operations and her operatives during a bleak period, with widely spread insurgencies in North-West Pakistan and Balochistan, disclosing of the nuclear proliferation case, and waves of suicide attacks throughout Pakistan emanating from the northwestern tribal belt. In his final days at the ISI, he also led the talks with Benazir Bhutto for a possible power sharing deal with Musharraf. In October 2007, after three years, he was replaced at the ISI by Lt Gen Nadeem Taj.

Kayani was also present at the March 2007 meeting that took place between Musharraf and Chief Justice Iftikhar Muhammad Chaudhry, when the former military ruler informed the top judge that he was suspended. Accounts of that meeting narrated that Kayani was the only one among Musharraf's aides who did not speak a word.

== Chief of Army Staff ==
In October 2007, Kayani's promotion papers for the appointment to the four-star rank was approved by the President Musharraf, and appointed him as the Vice Chief of Army Staff (VCOAS). At the time of the promotion, Kayani ultimately superseded the senior-most army general, Lt-Gen. Khalid Kidwai, who was on an extension for one year. On 28 November 2007, Kayani succeeded Musharraf as chief of army staff after Musharraf's retirement.

General Kayani is noted as the second four-star army general who held the directorship of the ISI but later then went on to become the Chief of Army Staff. The first appointment of ISI director being appointed to four-star appointment was in 1999 when General Ziauddin Butt was the first army general who was appointed as army chief after his brief tenure as ISI director.

It was during General Kayani's tenure that Pakistan turned the tide in its war against terror. Gen Kayani is also credited with developing response to Indian cold start doctrine, which the Army validated by conducting Azm e Nau exercises.

=== War against terror ===
General Kayani has been credited with having played a major role in turning the tide in favour of Pakistan in its armed conflict against Islamist militant groups active in North-West Pakistan. Before Kayani's tenure, under the command and administration of President General Pervez Musharraf, Pakistan had lost nearly 30% of its North-West Frontier Province and 100% of the FATA in the hands of Taliban and its allies. Under Pervez Musharraf, the situation in FATA further complicated with the emergence of Tehreek-Taliban Pakistan (TTP). Local Pakistani jihadi fighters that have previously fought Soviets, with support from Central Asian militant groups, Arab fighters of al-Qaeda, in 2007 formed TTP. The TTP, beside FATA, managed to capture four settle districts of North-Western Frontier Province (modern day Khyber-Pakhtunkhwa). The districts such as Buner, Dir, Shangla and Swat fell out of writ of Government of Pakistan by 2007 as militants flashed into mainland of Khyber-Pakhtunkhwa further expanding their influence beyond peripheries of FATA.

Moreover, Musharraf's decision to undertake Lal-Masjid Operation increased number of suicide attacks from 10 in 2006 to 61 in 2007. The deteriorated law and order situation saw assassination of former prime minister Benazir Bhutto in 2007 which was also claimed by the TTP.

Pakistan with the exit of Pervez Musharraf got a fresh civil-military setup under the President Asif Zardari-led government of PPP in 2008. Pakistan Army also witnessed a change of guard. Its new COAS Ashfaq Pervez Kayani decided to take on TTP and its Islamist allies.

In order to contain the militants General Kayani launched series of military campaigns to recapture areas fallen in the hands of militants from 2007 to 2013 beginning with Operation Sherdil, beside successfully taking ongoing campaigns of Armed Forces launched under the command of General Musharraf. The campaign that was launched by Kayani ended with success of Operation Zarb-e-Azb in late 2016. Pakistan Army under the Kayani Doctrine was able to capture six tribal agencies and four settled districts of Khyber-Pakhtunkhwa including Swat and South Waziristan, which were two strongholds of TTP. Thus, due to the Kayani's aggressive war doctrines Pakistan re-established its writ almost whole of the North-West and FATA exempting North-Waziristan and pockets of Khyber that were cleared from the militants by the Kayani's successors.

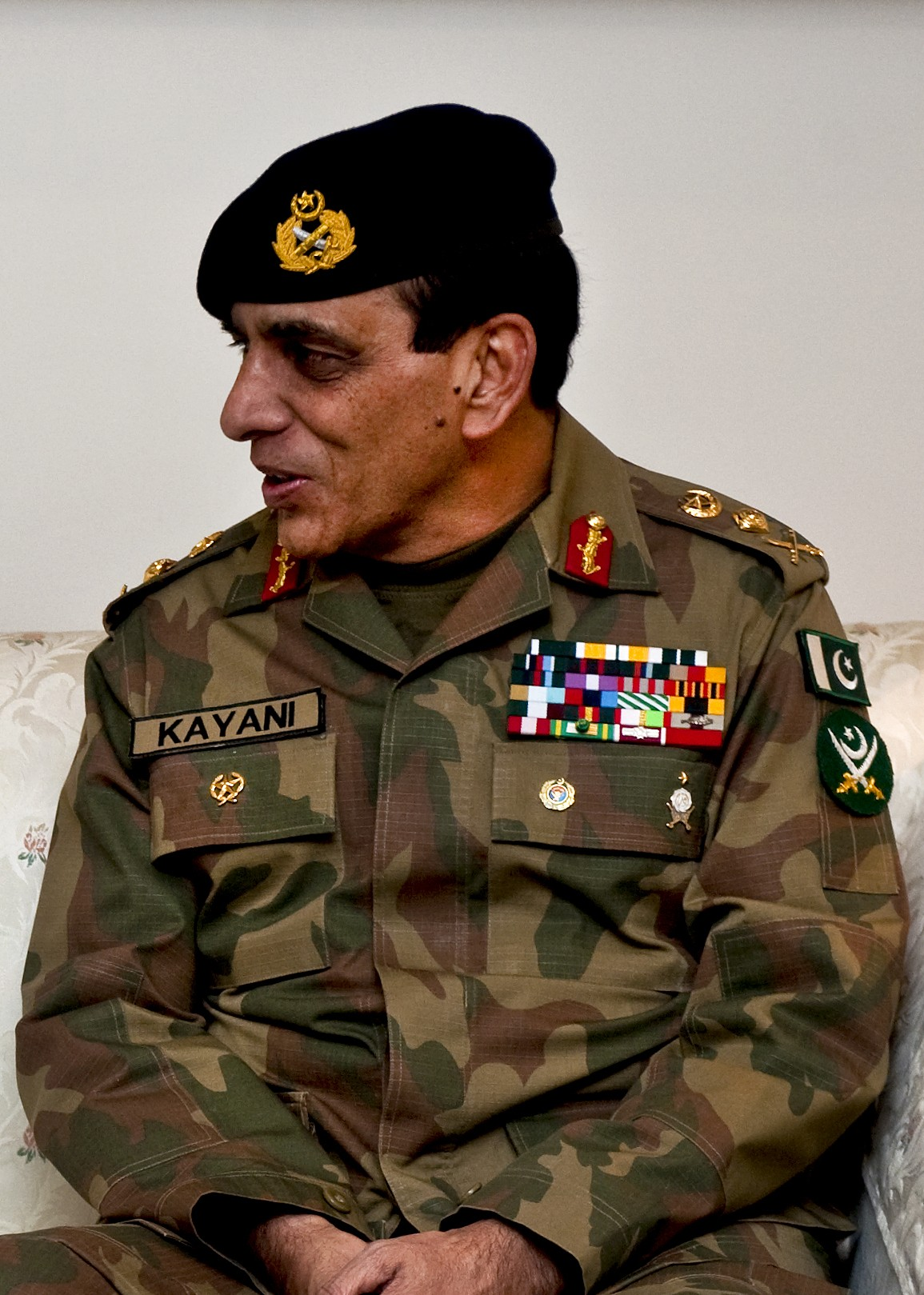
24 July 2010, Kayani as Chief of the Army Staff (COAS).

Military campaigns by Pakistan Armed Forces under General Kayani
#	Campaign	Date	location	Results
	Operation Rah-e-Haq	25 October – 8 December 2007	Swat Valley and Shangla	Pakistani victory: Led to the short-lived 2009 ceasefire; Sharia implemented in Swat; Ceasefire ended in the decisive Second Battle of Swat.
	Operation Zalzala	January–May 2008	Spinkai, South Waziristan	Pakistani victory: Following the operation, the Tehrik-i-Taliban Pakistan (TTP) offered a truce and peace negotiations resulting in a suspension of violence.; In spite of the victory in the operation, on 21 May 2008 Pakistan signed a peace agreement with the Tehrik-i-Taliban Pakistan (TTP).; Short-lived peace in South Waziristan.
	Operation Sirat-e-Mustaqeem	28 June – 9 July 2008	Bara	Pakistani victory: Pakistan Army gained control of strategic town of Bara on the outskirts of Peshawar.; The Peshawar was secured from the threat of militant takeover.; Destruction of LeI command and training centers.
	Operation Sherdil	7 August 2008 – 28 February 2009	Bajaur Agency	Decisive Pakistani victory: Bajaur fell back under Government control; Militant fled across border into Kunar Afghanistan; Enduring peace in Bajaur
	Operation Black Thunderstorm	26 April – 14 June 2009	Swat; Buner; Lower Dir; Shangla	Decisive Pakistani victory: Districts returned to Pakistani control; High ranking TTP leadership taken as POW; TTP's control confined to four agencies of FATA, namely, North Waziristan, Kurram, Khyber and Orakzai.; Mainland Khyber-Pakhtunkhwa secured.; Enduring peace across Malakand division.
	Operation Rah-e-Rast	16 May 2009 – 15 July 2009	Swat	Decisive Pakistani victory: Sub-Operation of Black Thunderstorm specifically targeted to flush out militants from Swat; Swat returned to government control; Multiple Tehrik-i-Taliban Pakistan commanders captured or killed; Ensured long term peace in Swat
	Operation Rah-e-Nijat	19 June 2009 – 12 December 2009	South Waziristan Agency	Decisive Pakistani victory: The military occupied the town of Kaniguram, a stronghold of former Russians fighters and Uzbeks led by the Islamic Movement of Uzbekistan.; Senior Taliban, Uzbek, Russian, and Al-Qaeda leadership abandoned their posts and escaped to neighboring Afghanistan; On December 12, 2009, the military took the control of the entire South Waziristan into the government control.; Pakistani forces established government writ in South Waziristan till Afghanistan-Pakistan border.; Enduring Peace in South Waziristan
	2009 Khyber Pass Offensive	1 September 2009 – 30 September 2009	Khyber Agency	Pakistani victory: NATO supply lines across Torkham border secured; Trade route between Afghanistan-Pakistan secured on National Highway 5.
	Operation Khwakh Ba De Sham	September 2009 – 21 January 2011	Kurram Agency; Orakzai Agency	Pakistani victory: 100% Orakzai and 90% of Kurram returned to Pakistani control; Militants fled to white mountains of Afghanistan Pakistan border; Sporadic militant attacks from white mountains continued in Kurram Agency
	Operation Brekhna	3 November 2009 – 20 December 2012	Mohmand Agency	Decisive Pakistani victory: Mohmand Agency fell back into the government control; Leadership of TTP fled to Afghanistan; Failure to kill or capture Ayman al-Zawahiri; Enduring peace in Mohmand
	Operation Koh-e-Sufaid	4 July 2011 – 18 August 2011	Kurram Agency	Decisive Pakistani victory: Militants flushed out from white mountains of Koh-e-Sufaid on Afghanistan–Pakistan border in Kurram Agency.; Thall–Parachinar transit route secured at Kharlachi border.; Militants fled across Afghanistan–Pakistan border; Kurram Agency effectively secured from militant attacks originating from Koh-e-Sufaid range.; Gains of Orakzai and Kurram offensive consolidated; Militants continued to maintain strong presence in Tirah Valley
	Operation Rah-e-Shahadat	5 April – 30 June 2013	Tirah Valley	Decisive Pakistani victory: Militants flushed out from Tirah Valley; Headquarters of Lashkar-e-Islam destroyed; TTP and LeI leadership fled across Afghanistan; Militants continued to pose threat to Khyber Agency from across the border.

=== Withdrawal of military secondment from civilian institutions ===
In January 2008 General Kayani passed a directive which ordered military officers not to maintain contacts with politicians. It was further made public on 13 February 2008 that General Kayani ordered the withdrawal of military officers from all of Pakistan's government civil departments. It was an action that reversed the policies of his predecessor, President Musharraf. It was welcomed by President Musharraf's critics, who have long demanded that the military distance itself from politics. The Pakistani media reported that the army officers would be withdrawn from 23 wide-ranging civil departments, including the National Highway Authority, National Accountability Bureau, Ministry of Education, and Water and Power Development Authority.

=== General elections in 2008 ===
On 7 March 2008 General Kayani confirmed that Pakistan's armed forces would stay out of politics and support the new government. He told a gathering of military commanders in the garrison city of Rawalpindi that "the army fully stands behind the democratic process and is committed to playing its constitutional role". The comments made were after the results of the 2008 Pakistani general election where the Pakistan Peoples Party won the election and began forming a coalition government who were opposed to President Pervez Musharraf.

=== Perceptions of Kayani as COAS ===
When he became COAS, several top-level US officials visited General Kayani in succession to make up their own minds about him. Most, including the then CIA chief Michael Hayden, National Intelligence Director Mike McConnell and former CENTCOM-commander Admiral William J. Fallon came away confident that Kayani "knows what he's doing."

Kayani's first move as army chief was to visit the front lines in the Federally Administered Tribal Areas (FATA). He launched several successful operations against the TTP and its affiliates. All major kinetic operations, except the operation in North Waziristan, were conducted under command of Gen Kayani. He used to frequently visit the frontlines and was always easily accessible.

=== War in Afghanistan and the United States ===
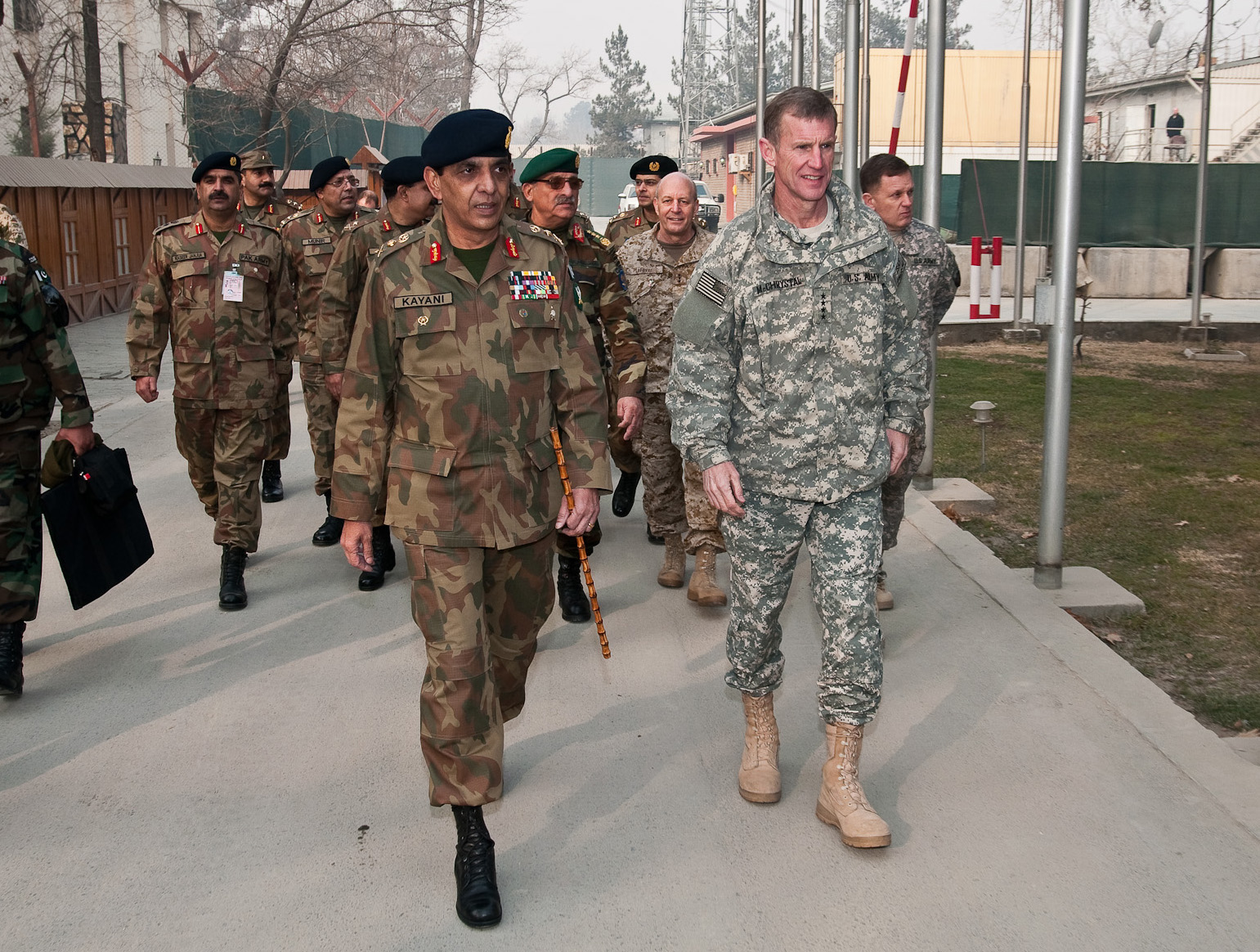
Gen. Kayani and Gen. Stanley A. McChrystal (Commander of NATO ISAF and US Forces Afghanistan) during 29th Tripartite Commission meeting.

About the Afghan war, Kayani is reported to have said, "the Pakistani people believe that the real aim of U.S. [war] strategy is to denuclearize Pakistan."

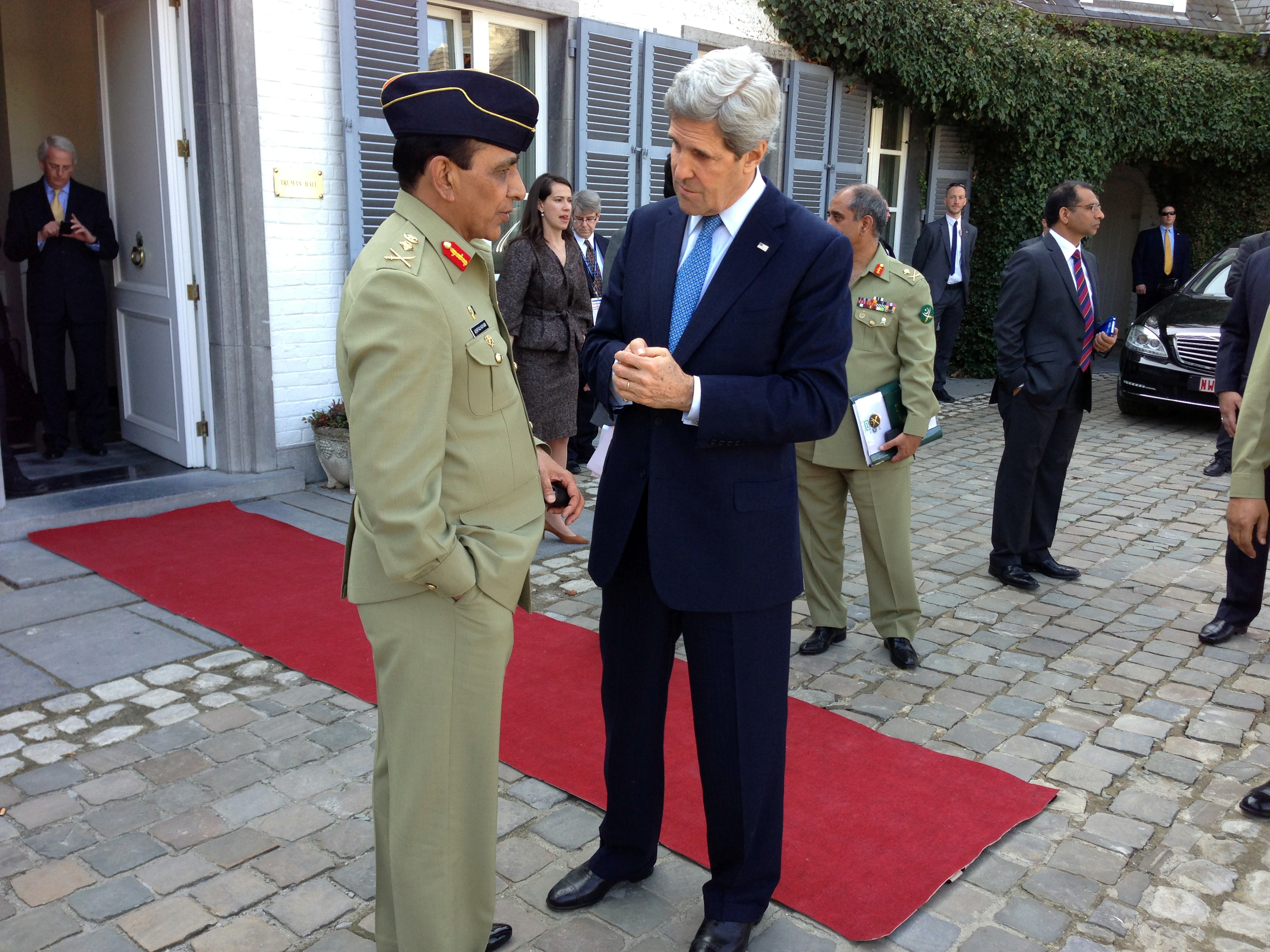
24 April 2013, John Kerry bids farewell to Gen. Kayani in Brussels, Belgium.

In January 2011, and after, there was criticism of General Kayani's handling of the Raymond Davis saga. Davis, a CIA contractor, was hastily tried and acquitted of murder charges in exchange for blood money paid to relatives of the victims, after which he was sent out of Pakistan within a matter of hours. Knowing the dynamics of the Pakistani state and the nature of this particular case, it was impossible for Davis to be released and deported from Pakistan without the knowledge and co-operation of Pakistan's Army and the Inter-Services Intelligence (ISI).

The day after Davis' release, over 40 people were killed in the Datta Khel airstrike in North Waziristan in the FATA, in a drone strike by a US Predator aircraft. The target appeared to be a compound operated by Hafiz Gul Bahadur, a Tehrik-i-Taliban leader. The dead included local tribal leaders. The strike, intended to further the local war effort, instead added to the unpopularity of drone strikes and added to the anti-American sentiment in Pakistan. Kayani conducted a rare press conference in which he condemned the drone strike (even persuading the Pakistani government to summon American Ambassador to Pakistan, Cameron Munter, and lodge a "protest in the strongest possible terms") and labelled it "intolerable". In 2011, after delivering a long lecture at the National Defence University, one staff officer reportedly got up and challenged his policy of co-operation with the United States. The officer asked, "If they don't trust us, how can we trust them?" according to one professor who was briefed on the session. General Kayani essentially responded, "We can't."

Kayani's comments about the Datta Khel strike were viewed in the broader context of public and private communications by Pakistani officials with Washington, including an April 2011, visit by the head of the ISI, Lt. Gen. Ahmed Shuja Pasha, to CIA Director Leon Panetta at CIA headquarters. "[S]ome officials in both countries [were] saying intelligence ties [we]re at their lowest point since the Sept. 11, 2001, attacks spurred the alliance," according to one report. The report went on to say the overall communications included private demands that the CIA suspend drone strikes and also reduce the number of US intelligence and Special Operations personnel in the country. After the ISI-CIA meeting, CIA spokesman George Little stated that the intelligence relationship "remains on solid footing".

== Retirement ==
In 2013, General Kayani was in the race for the chairmanship of joint chiefs of staff committee along with Admiral Asif Sandila and Air Chief Marshal Tahir Rafiq; though he was shortlisted for the appointment, on 6 October 2013, General Kayani announced that he would be retiring, his due date of retirement in November, ending speculation that he might get another extension or would be appointed Chairman Joint Chief of staff Committee.

His retirement was confirmed when Prime Minister Nawaz Sharif approved then-Lieutenant General Raheel Sharif as chief of army staff and Lieutenant General Rashid Mehmood as Chairman Joint chiefs on 27 November 2013.

== Awards and decorations ==

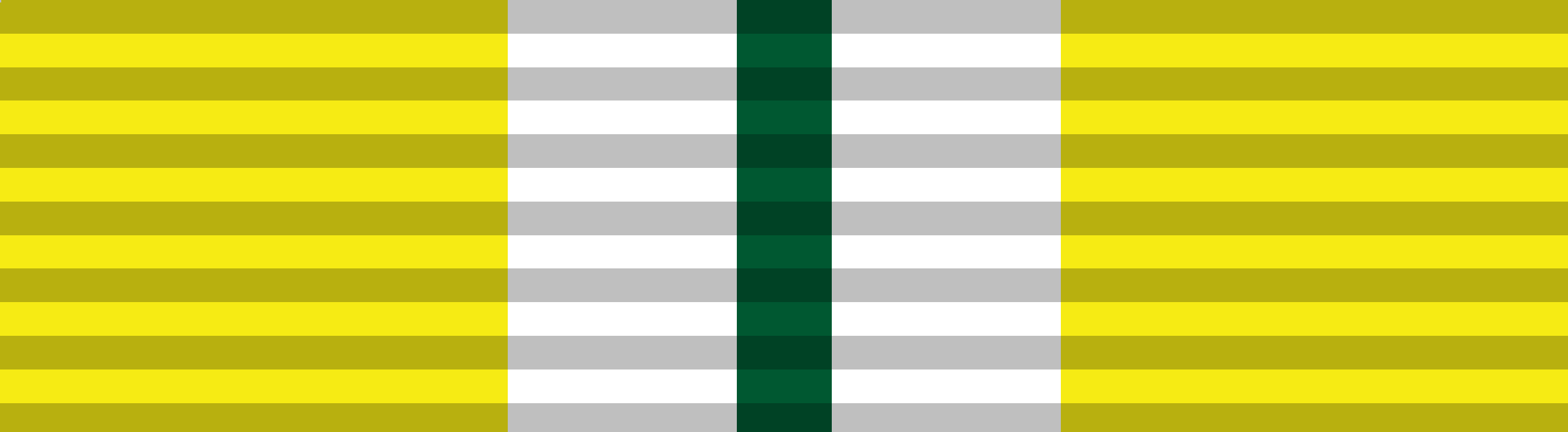

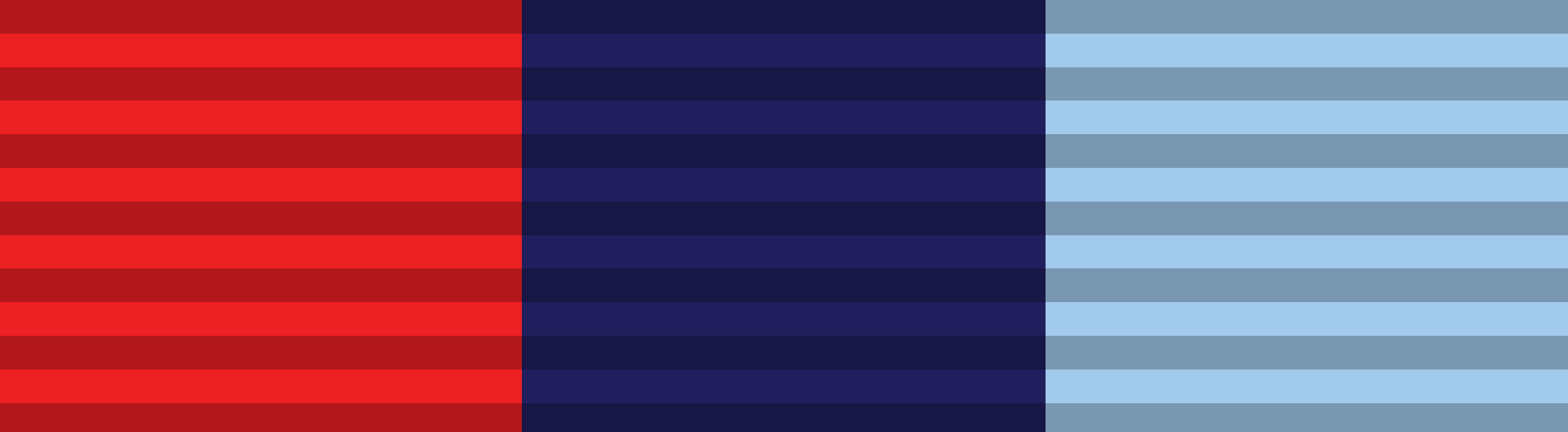

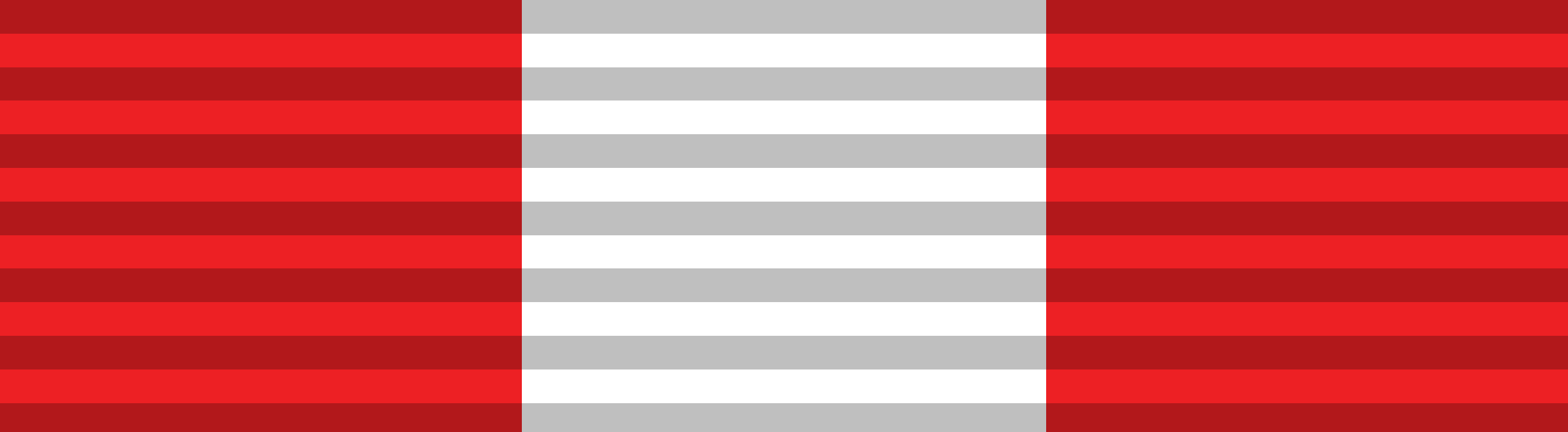

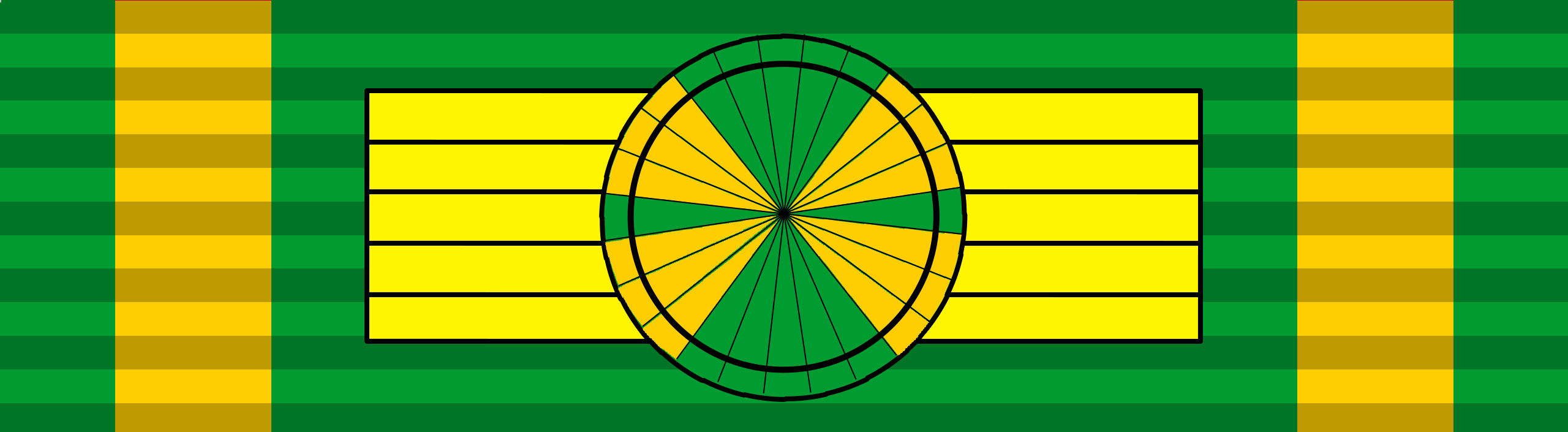

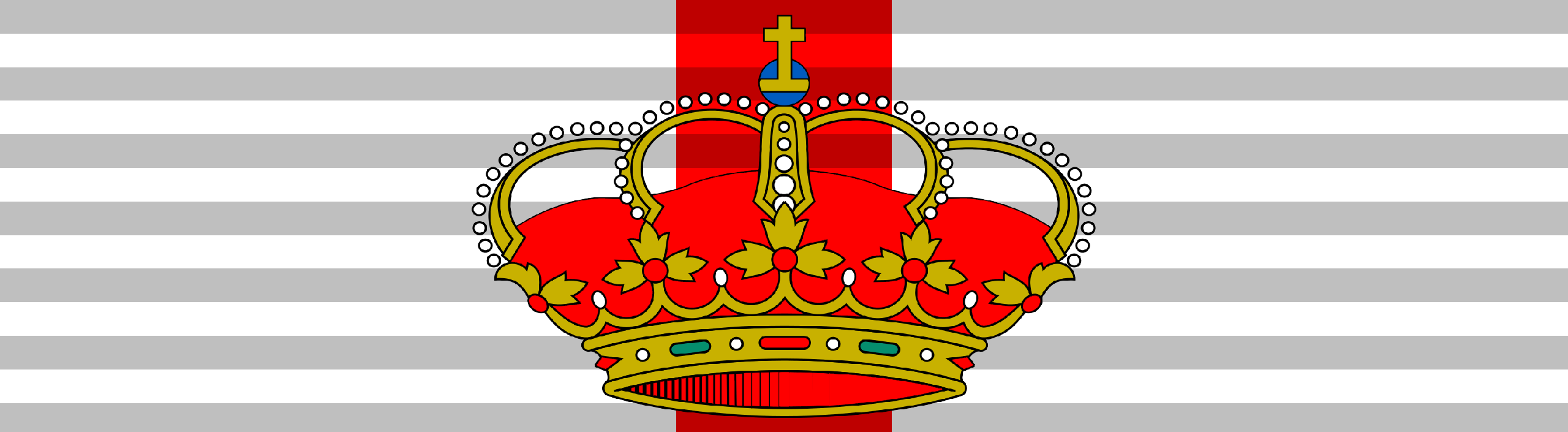

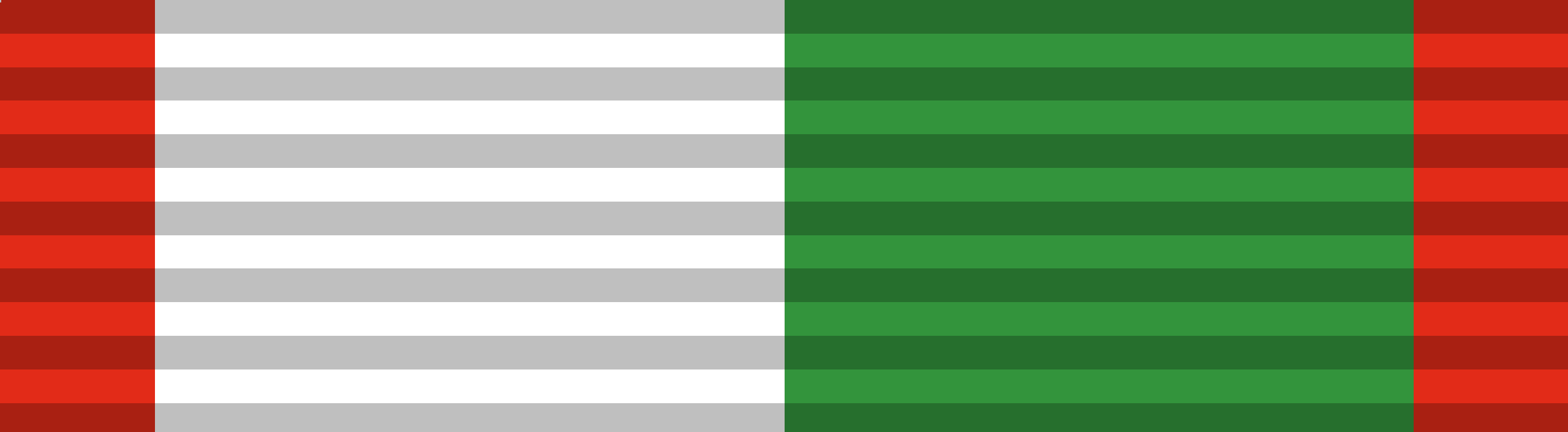

	Nishan-e-Imtiaz (Military) (Order of Excellence)		
Hilal-e-Imtiaz (Civilian) (Crescent of Excellence) (2004)	Hilal-e-Imtiaz (Military) (Crescent of Excellence)	Tamgha-e-Diffa (General Service Medal) Siachen Glacier Clasp	Sitara-e-Harb 1971 War (War Star 1971)
Tamgha-e-Jang 1971 War (War Medal 1971)	Tamgha-e-Baqa (Nuclear Test Medal) 1998	Tamgha-e-Istaqlal Pakistan (Escalation with India Medal) 2002	10 Years Service Medal
20 Years Service Medal	30 Years Service Medal	35 Years Service Medal	40 Years Service Medal
Tamgha-e-Sad Saala Jashan-e- Wiladat-e-Quaid-e-Azam (100th Birth Anniversary of Muhammad Ali Jinnah) 1976	Hijri Tamgha (Hijri Medal) 1979	Jamhuriat Tamgha (Democracy Medal) 1988	Qarardad-e-Pakistan Tamgha (Resolution Day Golden Jubilee Medal) 1990
Tamgha-e-Salgirah Pakistan (Independence Day Golden Jubilee Medal) 1997	Command & Staff College Quetta Instructor's Medal	Turkish Legion of Merit (Turkey)	Order of King Abdul Aziz (Saudi Arabia)
The Legion of Merit (Degree of Commander) (United States) 2009	Legion of Honour (France) 2009	Order of Military Merit (Spain) 2011	Order Of Glory (Tajikistan) 2013

=== Foreign decorations ===
Foreign Awards
Turkey	Turkish Legion of Merit
Saudi Arabia	Order of King Abdul Aziz (Class I)
United States	The Legion of Merit (Degree of Commander)
France	Légion d'honneur
Spain	Order of Military Merit
Tajikistan	Order of Glory (Tajikistan)

== See also ==
- Indo-Pakistani War of 1971
- Tariq Majid

Military offices
Preceded by Ehsan ul Haq	Director General of the Inter-Services Intelligence; 2004–2007	Succeeded by Nadeem Taj
Preceded by Ahsan Saleem Hyat	Vice Chief of Army Staff; 2007	Post abolished
Preceded by Pervez Musharraf	Chief of Army Staff; 2007 – 2013	Succeeded by Raheel Sharif
Preceded by Khalid Shameem Wynne	Chairman Joint Chiefs of Staff Committee (Acting); 2013	Succeeded by Rashad Mahmood
