= Yusaf Khan (general) =

Pakistani general

General Yusaf Khan NI(M) HI(M) LoM
- محمد یوسف خان

Vice Chief of Army Staff
- In office 8 October 2001 – 6 October 2004
- Preceded by: Lt. Gen.Mirza Aslam Beg
- Succeeded by: Lt. Gen. Ahsan Saleem Hayat

Personal details
- Born: Muhammad Yusaf Khan; February 10, 1948 (age 78) Sargodha, Punjab, Dominion of Pakistan
- Awards: Nishan-e-Imtiaz (Military) Hilal-e-Imtiaz (Military) Legion of Merit

Military service
- Allegiance: Pakistan
- Branch/service: Pakistan Army
- Years of service: 1964–2004
- Rank: General
- Unit: Guides Cavalry, Armoured Corps
- Commands: Vice Chief of Army Staff; Chief of General Staff; II Corps in Multan; Military Secretary (MS)
- Battles/wars: Indo-Pakistan War of 1965; Indo-Pakistan War of 1971; Indo-Pakistani War of 1999; India-Pakistan standoff 2001

Muhammad Yusaf Khan NI(M) HI(M) LoM (Urdu: محمد یوسف خان; born February 10, 1948) is a former senior general of the Pakistan Army who served as the Vice Chief of Army Staff (VCOAS) from October 8, 2001 until October 7, 2004. Following the end of his 3-year term in October 2004, he was succeeded by General Ahsan Saleem Hyat.

== Military career ==
Yusaf Khan graduated from Military College Jhelum (College No. 2642), He was commissioned in the Pakistan Army in 1966 in the 37th PMA Long Course and joined the Guides Cavalry. He served various command and staff posts including Commanding Officer Guides Cavalry, Commanding Officer of a Tank Battalion in Saudi Arabia, Instructor at Command and Staff College, Chief of Staff of a Strike Corps, Commander of an armoured division, Chief of General Staff, and finally the Vice Chief of Army Staff of the Pakistan Army.

Yusaf Khan was promoted to Lieutenant General in June 1998 and sent as the Military Secretary (MS) in the GHQ. Later on 29 October 1998, he was transferred as Commander II Corps, Multan.

=== Military coup of 1999 and Chief of General Staff ===
During the time of military coup of 1999, the then Lieutenant General Muhammad Yusaf Khan was the Corps Commander Multan. By September 2000, he was posted as Chief of General Staff (CGS) to replace the then Lieutenant General Aziz Khan who was instead given the command of Lahore Corps. The post of Chief of General Staff is considered vital as the chief overlooks the two intelligence bureaus within Pakistan Army (Military Intelligence and Intelligence Bureau).

=== Vice Chief of Army Staff ===
In October 2001, Yusaf was promoted to four-star general as the Vice Chief of Army Staff. He was junior only to Usmani, hence superseding one officer while ascending to the four-star post of VCOAS. The timing of promotion of General Yusaf and General Aziz Khan coincided with the US invasion of Afghanistan, when these generals superseded Lieutenant General Muzaffar Usmani and Lieutenant General Mahmud Ahmed, both of whom were known for their hawkish stances.

Yusaf also stayed the ceremonial post of Colonel-in-Chief of the Armoured Corps of the Pakistan Army. The four-star general is usually promoted as the Colonel-in-Chief of his respective unit. He was promoted to that position by President General Pervez Musharraf on 31 March 2003 at the Armoured Corps Regimental Center in Nowshera and continued till 3 May 2005 when he was replaced by General Ahsan Saleem Hyat.

== Awards and decorations ==

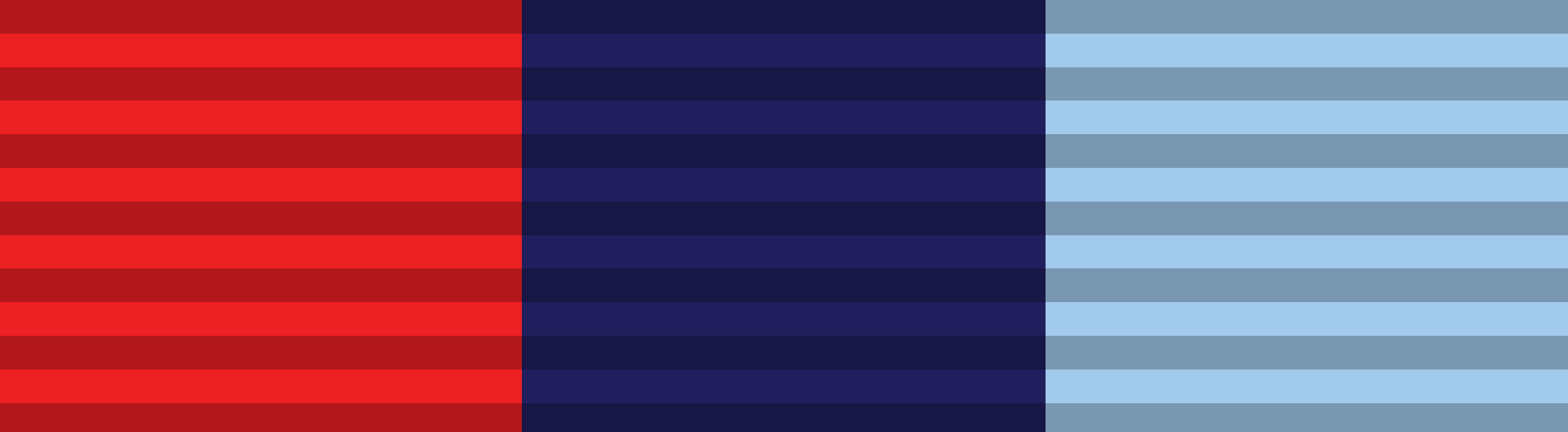

Nishan-e-Imtiaz (Military) (Order of Excellence)		Hilal-e-Imtiaz (Military) (Crescent of Excellence)	
Sitara-e-Harb 1965 War (War Star 1965)	Sitara-e-Harb 1971 War (War Star 1971)	Tamgha-e-Jang 1965 War (War Medal 1965)	Tamgha-e-Jang 1971 War (War Medal 1971)
Tamgha-e-Baqa (Nuclear Test Medal) 1998	Tamgha-e-Istaqlal Pakistan (Escalation with India Medal) 2002	10 Years Service Medal	20 Years Service Medal
30 Years Service Medal	40 Years Service Medal	Tamgha-e-Sad Saala Jashan-e- Wiladat-e-Quaid-e-Azam (100th Birth Anniversary of Muhammad Ali Jinnah) 1976	Hijri Tamgha (Hijri Medal) 1979
Jamhuriat Tamgha (Democracy Medal) 1988	Qarardad-e-Pakistan Tamgha (Resolution Day Golden Jubilee Medal) 1990	Tamgha-e-Salgirah Pakistan (Independence Day Golden Jubilee Medal) 1997	The Legion of Merit (Degree of Commander) (USA)

=== Foreign Decorations ===
Foreign Awards
USA	The Legion of Merit (Degree of Commander)

Military offices
Preceded by Aziz Khan	Chief of General Staff; 2000 – 2001	Succeeded by Shahid Aziz
Preceded by Mirza Aslam Baig	Vice Chief of Army Staff; 2001 – 2004	Succeeded by Ahsan Saleem Hyat
