= Ahsan Saleem Hayat =

Pakistani general

Ahsan Saleem Hayat NI(M) HI(M) LoM LoH
- Born: 10 January 1948 (age 78); Sargodha, Punjab, Pakistan
- Education: Pakistan Military Academy
- Military career
- Allegiance: Pakistan
- Branch: Pakistan Army
- Service years: 1968 – 2007
- Rank: General
- Service number: PA – 9572
- Unit: 33 Cavalry
- Commands: Vice Chief of Army Staff; V Corps; DG Operations Planning at the GHQ Secretariat; Chief Instructor at the National Defence University; 42 Lancers
- Conflicts: Indo-Pakistan War of 1971; 2001–2002 India–Pakistan standoff; War in North-West Pakistan
- Awards: Nishan-e-Imtiaz (Military); Hilal-e-Imtiaz (Military); Legion of Merit; Legion of Honour

General Ahsan Saleem Hayat NI(M) HI(M) LoM LoH (Urdu: احسن سلیم حیات ; born 10 January 1948), is a retired senior officer of the Pakistan Army who served as the Vice Chief of Army Staff of the Pakistan Army from 2004 until his retirement in 2007. Prior to that, he served as the operational field commander of the V Corps in Sindh Province and was a full-tenured professor of war studies at the National Defence University. He was succeeded by General Ashfaq Parvez Kayani on 8 October 2007.

== Army career ==
He was a military brat, coming from a military family. Through his parents recommendations, he attended the PAF High School in Sargodha, Punjab. Upon graduation, he went on to attend the Pakistan Military Academy (PMA) in the 11th War Course. He was given commission as a second lieutenant in the Pakistan Army Armoured Corps in 1968 and actively participated in the Indo-Pakistani War of 1971 on the western fronts.

As a brigadier, he commanded the elite 3rd Independent Armored Brigade based in Lahore from 1991 to 1993. In 1993, he was posted as Chief Instructor of Command and Staff College in Quetta. He also served as Director General planning, at the Chief of Army Staff (COAS) Secretariat. He also served as the Chief Instructor of the Armed Forces War College at the then National Defence University in Islamabad before being promoted to Lieutenant General in December 2000.

=== Assassination attempt ===
Before being appointed Vice Chief, he was the commander of the V Corps at Karachi. This formation's area of operation covers almost the entire territory of the Sindh province. On 10 June 2004, he survived an assassination attempt when his convoy was attacked by militants from the terrorist outfit Jundallah. At least 11 men in his escort were martyred, but he survived.

== Vice Chief of Army Staff ==
He was commander of the V Corps at the time of his promotion to four star general, and he replaced General Yusaf Khan as the Vice Chief of Army Staff whose term expired in October 2004. Hayat was fourth in seniority when he ascended to the post. Lieutenant Generals Hamid Javaid, Javed Hassan, and Munir Hafiez were senior to him; hence standing superseded once Hayat was promoted. His term expired in October 2007. He was replaced by General Ashfaq Parvez Kayani, who became the country's new Chief of Army Staff once General Pervez Musharraf retired from the army.

General Ahsan later became the colonel-in-chief of the Armoured Corps at the Armoured Corps Regimental Center, Nowshera on 5 May 2005, succeeding General Yusaf Khan.

== Awards and decorations ==

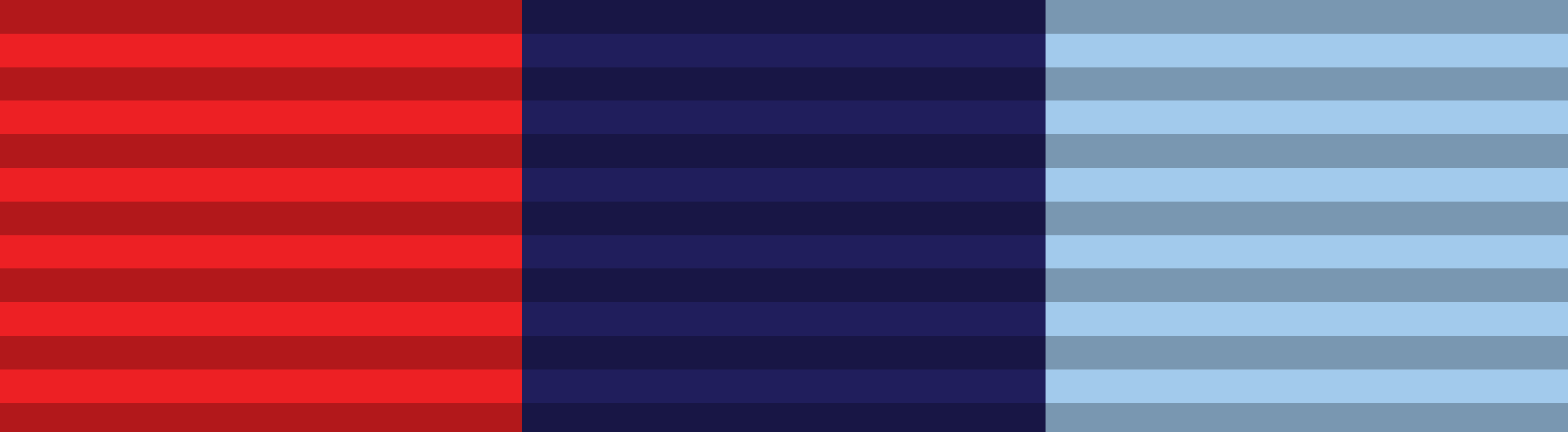

Nishan-e-Imtiaz (Military) (Order of Excellence)	Hilal-e-Imtiaz (Military) (Crescent of Excellence)		Sitara-e-Harb 1971 War (War Star 1971)
Tamgha-e-Jang 1971 War (War Medal 1971)	Tamgha-e-Baqa (Nuclear Test Medal) 1998	Tamgha-e-Istaqlal Pakistan (Escalation with India Medal) 2002	10 Years Service Medal
20 Years Service Medal	30 Years Service Medal	35 Years Service Medal	40 Years Service Medal
Tamgha-e-Sad Saala Jashan-e- Wiladat-e-Quaid-e-Azam (100th Birth Anniversary of Muhammad Ali Jinnah) 1976	Hijri Tamgha (Hijri Medal) 1979	Jamhuriat Tamgha (Democracy Medal) 1988	Qarardad-e-Pakistan Tamgha (Resolution Day Golden Jubilee Medal) 1990
Tamgha-e-Salgirah Pakistan (Independence Day Golden Jubilee Medal) 1997	Command and Staff CollegeQuetta Instructor's Medal	The Legion of Merit (Degree of Commander) (United States)	Legion of Honour (Knight) (France)

=== Foreign decorations ===
Foreign Awards
United States	The Legion of Merit (Degree of Commander)
France	Legion of Honour - Knight

== Notes ==
Military offices
Preceded by Yusaf Khan	Vice Chief of Army Staff; 2004–2007	Succeeded by Ashfaq Parvez Kayani
