= Sawar Khan =

Pakistani general (1924–2023)

Sawar Khan NI(M) HI(M) SBt
- Official military portrait, c. 1980

1st Vice Chief of Army Staff (Pakistan)
- In office 13 April 1980 – 22 March 1984
- President: Zia-ul-Haq
- Preceded by: Abdul Hamid Khan (As Chief of Staff)
- Succeeded by: Khalid Mahmud Arif

Governor of Punjab, Pakistan
- In office 18 September 1978 – 1 May 1980

Corps Commander Lahore
- In office January 1978 – March 1980

Directing Staff Staff College, Quetta
- In office 9 June 1965 – 6 September 1965

Personal details
- Born: 1 December 1924 Rawalpindi District, British India
- Died: 8 November 2023 (aged 98) CMH Rawalpindi, Pakistan
- Education: Officers' Training School, Bangalore; Staff College, Quetta

Military service
- Branch/service: British Indian Army (1946–1947); Pakistan Army (1947–1984)
- Years of service: 1946–1984
- Rank: General
- Unit: Artillery
- Commands: XI Corps; Adjutant General; IV Corps
- Battles/wars: Indo-Pakistani War of 1965; Indo-Pakistani War of 1971
- Awards: See list

Sawar Khan (Note: Urdu:سوار خان) (1 December 1924 – 8 November 2023) was a former four-star general of the Pakistan Army, twentieth Governor of Punjab from 1978 to 1980 and the first Vice Chief of Army Staff of the Pakistan Army from 1980 to 1984, in the military regime of President General Zia-ul-Haq who simultaneously served as the Chief of Army Staff. After retiring, Khan became the President of the Northern University, Nowshera.

Khan died in November 2023, at the age of 99.

== Early life and military career ==
Sawar Khan was born on 1 December 1924 into a Muslim Gujjar family to Chaudhary Khuda Bukhsh, the Numberdar of Raman, Rawalpindi. He was commissioned before the independence of Pakistan in 1947 into the Indian Army's Corps of Artillery. He later opted for Pakistan Army in 1947. As a captain, Sawar became the Instructor Gunnery (IG) at the Artillery School.

== General officer ==
Khan was promoted to Lt. General on 24 March 1976 by General Zia-ul-Haq after he became the Chief of Army Staff superseding five other generals. Sawar Khan who at the time was serving as Adjutant General (AG) at the GHQ was sent as the Commander XI Corps, Peshawar, where he replaced the recently superseded Lt. Gen. Majeed Malik. He continued to serve in Peshawar until January 1978 when he was replaced by Lt. Gen. Fazle Haq. In 1978, Lt. Gen. Sawar Khan moved to Lahore to take over IV Corps as its Corps Commander. He took over from Lt. Gen. Iqbal Khan who proceeded as the Vice Chief of the Army Staff (VOAS), a newly created post.

== Martial law administrator of Punjab ==
When Zia imposed martial law, the then Lt. Gen. Sawar Khan was sent as the governor of Punjab province in 1978, in addition to his responsibilities as Commander IV Corps, Lahore. He was part of small coterie of generals under General Zia ul-Haq, who determined the national security policies in the martial regime. The other generals were Lt. Gen. Faiz Ali Chishti (Commander X Corps, Rawalpindi), Lt. Gen. Jehanzeb Arbab (Governor of Sindh and Commander V Corps, Karachi), Lt. Gen. Iqbal Khan (CJCSC), and the other military governors of Khyber-Pakhtunkhwa and Balochistan Fazle Haq and Rahimuddin Khan.

After a two-year stint, he was replaced by Lt. Gen. Ghulam Jilani Khan and promoted to four-star general.

== Vice Chief of Army Staff ==
In March 1980, when the post of the deputy chief of army staff (created by Zia-ul-Haq) was redefined and re-designated as the Vice Chief of Army Staff, General Sawar replaced Lt. Gen. Iqbal Khan. General Sawar was replaced by the Zia's deputy General Khalid Mahmud Arif in March 1984 after completing the four-year term. Sawar was a professional soldier and hailed from the Potohar plateau of north Punjab, which had been a traditional recruitment area for the British and the Pakistani armies.

== Awards and decorations ==

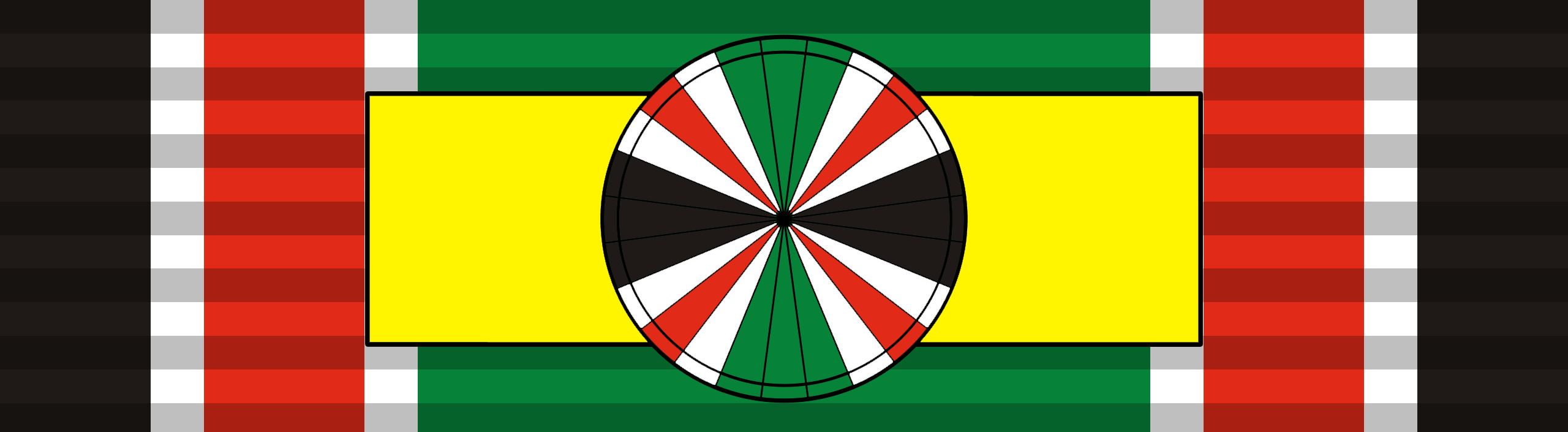

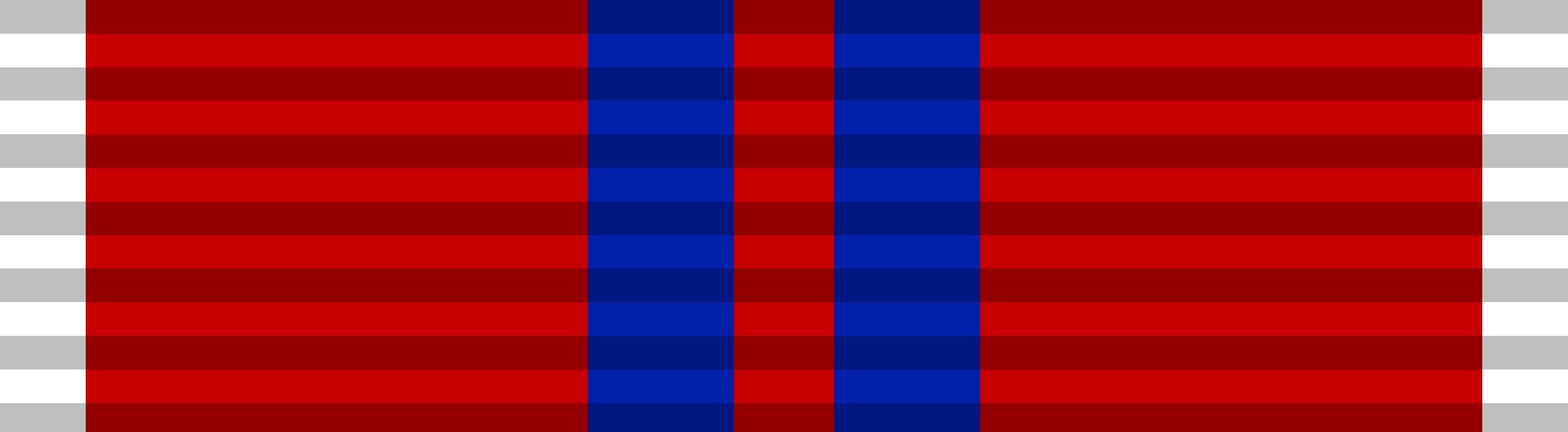

Nishan-e-Imtiaz (Military) (Order of Excellence)		Hilal-i-Imtiaz (Military) (Crescent of Excellence)	
Sitara-e-Basalat (Star of Valour)	Sitara-e-Harb 1971 War (War Star 1971)	Tamgha-e-Jang 1965 War (War Medal 1965)	Tamgha-e-Jang 1971 War (War Medal 1971)
Pakistan Tamgha (Pakistan Medal) 1947	Tamgha-e-Sad Saala Jashan-e-Wiladat-e-Quaid-e-Azam (100th Birth Anniversary of Muhammad Ali Jinnah)	Tamgha-e-Qayam-e-Jamhuria (Republic Commemoration Medal) 1956	Hijri Tamgha (Hijri Medal) 1979
Order of Military Merit Grand Cordon (Jordan)	War Medal 1939-1945	India Service Medal 1939–1945	Queen Elizabeth II Coronation Medal (1953)

=== Foreign Decorations ===
Foreign Awards
Jordan	The Order of Military Merit (Grand Cordon)
UK	War Medal 1939-1945
UK	India Service Medal 1939–1945
UK	Queen Elizabeth II Coronation Medal

== See also ==
- Gang of Four (Pakistan)

Political offices
Preceded by Aslam Riaz Hussain	Governor of Punjab; 1978–1980	Succeeded by Ghulam Jilani Khan
Military offices
Preceded by Iqbal Khan	Vice Chief of Army Staff; 1980–1984	Succeeded by Khalid Mahmud Arif
