= Operation Rah-e-Shahadat =

Joint-military operation involving Pakistan against armed insurgent groups

- Part of the Insurgency in Khyber Pakhtunkhwa and the Global War on Terrorism
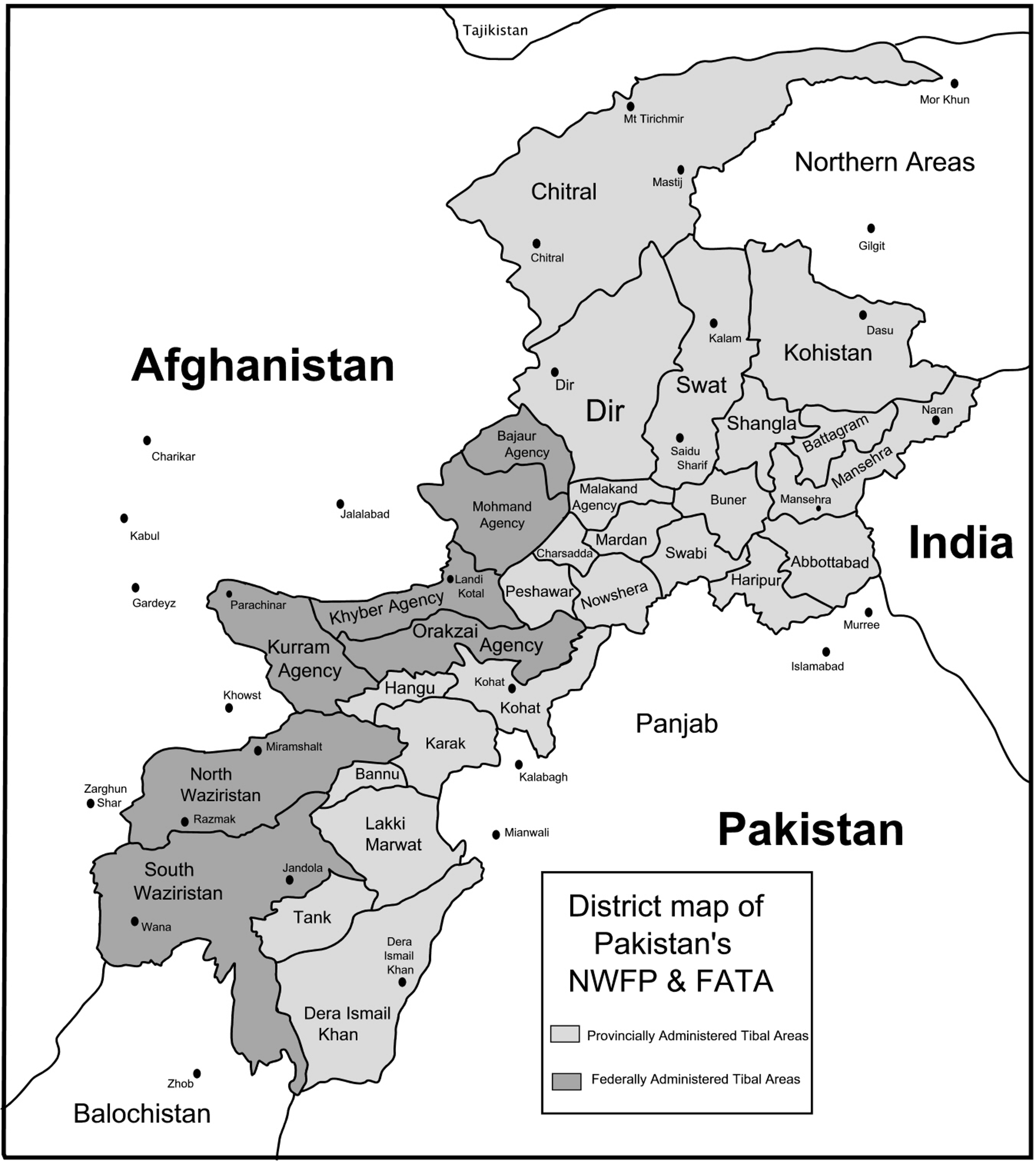
- Military Intelligence map: Domain of Pakistan Armed Forces Operations to the areas adjacent to Afghanistan.
Date	5 April 2013 – 30 June 2013
Location	Tirah Valley, FATA
Result	Pakistani victory

Commander(s) and Belligerent(s)
Pakistan	Tehrik-i-Taliban Pakistan; Swat Taliban; Lashkar-e-Islam

Commanders and leaders
Gen. Ashfaq Parvez Kayani; LGen Khalid Rabbani; Air Mshl Waseem-ud-din; RAdm Ather Mukhtar; MGen Ghayur Mehmood	Hakimullah Mehsud; Maulana Fazlullah; Mangal Bagh Afridi; Omar Khalid Khorasani

Units involved
(Pakistan) North–Western Forces Contingent; Northern Light Infantry Regiment	Unknown

Strength
5,000	Unknown

Casualties and losses
Unknown	Hundreds

Operation Rah-e-Shahadat (English: Path of Martyrdom; Urdu:راه شهادث), was a codename of a joint military operation that was commenced on 5 April 2013 by the Pakistan Army, with assistance provided by the PAF and Navy for air support. In close coordination with Local Peace Committee (Aman Lashkar), the army troops and special operations forces, aided by Frontier Corps, to flush out TTP and LeI militants from the Tirah Valley of the Khyber Agency. At least four Pakistani soldiers and 14 insurgents were killed while 5 soldiers were also wounded. In a major aerial operation, the Pakistan Air Force and navy fighter jets pounded hideouts of banned group LeI in and according to military intelligence reports, many militants escaped from the areas taking with them their injured fighters.

On 12 April 2013, nine Pakistani soldiers and seven insurgents were killed during clashes in Sipah area of Tirah Valley. The security forces took control of the areas of Sandana and Sheikhmal Khel in Sipah area. Three Lashkar-e-Islam militants were also arrested while a dozen others were injured. Two peace committee members were killed and 22 others were injured in a bomb blast in the same area.

On 13 April 2013, Pakistan Army's ISPR said that seven militants were killed in the Tirah Valley on 12 April. It did not confirm the casualties suffered by the security forces.

On 16 April 2013, a member of Zakhakhel peace committee (Tawheedul-ul-Islam) was killed in a bomb blast in Dari area of Tirah Valley.

On 2 May 2013, four Taliban-linked insurgents were killed and five others wounded after Pakistani fighter jets targeted TTP hideouts in the Tirah Valley.

On 5 May 2013, Pakistan Army's ISPR said that 16 insurgents and two soldiers were killed during heavy clashes in the Tirah Valley. Three soldiers were reported to be wounded. The military also claimed to have captured militant strongholds Kismat Sur and Sanghar and recovered huge cache of arms and ammunition from the militants fleeing the area.
