= Deputy Chief of the Army Staff (Pakistan) =

Pakistan Army's Deputy chief

Deputy chief of Army Staff
- Pakistan Army
- Type: Principal staff officer
- Abbreviation: DCOAS
- Reports to: Vice Chief of the Army Staff
- Seat: GHQ, Rawalpindi
- Formation: 17 May 2001; 25 years ago
- First holder: Lieutenant General Muzaffar Hussain Usmani
- Abolished: 8 October 2001; 25 years ago
- Unofficial names: Deputy Army Chief

The Deputy Chief of the Army Staff (DCOAS) was the deputy of the Chief of Army Staff and held the rank of Lieutenant-General.

== History ==
It was first officially established in May 2001 as the Principal Staff Officer of the Pakistan army by then Chief Executive of Pakistan General Pervez Musharraf after the 1999 military takeover.

The post of the Deputy Chief of the army staff is the third most senior position and the appointment holder is a three-star general. To date, only one Deputy COAS has been appointed and that is Lt. General Muzaffar Hussain Usmani who was appointed as Deputy Chief on 3 May 2001 by then Chief executive and COAS General Pervez Musharraf.

During Usmani's time as Deputy COAS held the rank of a three-star general and occupied the second-highest military position in the Pakistan Army. Gen. Musharraf's decision to appoint him was seen as a means to consolidate his own authority and potentially pave the way for his ascension to the presidency of Pakistan. However, their relationship soured over time, leading to Lt. Gen. Usmani's removal from the position in October 2001.

== Appointees ==
Mentioned below is the only general to serve as Deputy Chief of Army Staff

| No. | Portrait | Name (Birth–Death) | Term of office | | | Unit of commission | Ref. | |
| No. | Portrait | Name (Birth–Death) | Took office | Left office | Time in office | Unit of commission | Ref. | Notes |
|---|---|---|---|---|---|---|---|---|
| 1 | | Lieutenant General; Muzaffar Hussain Usmani HI(M) (1966–2020) | 17 May 2001 | 8 October 2001 | 144 days | 10 Frontier Force Regiment | | (Note: Lt. Gen. Usmani commenced his service in the Pakistan Army as a commissioned officer in 1966. Over a span of four decades, he fulfilled numerous command and staff roles, showcasing his versatile capabilities. Notably, he assumed leadership of a corps-sized formation stationed in Bahawalpur.) |

== See also ==
- Vice Chief of the Army Staff
- Deputy Chief of the Naval Staff
- Deputy Chief of the Air Staff
