= Orakzai and Kurram offensive =

2010 Pakistani military operation

Operation Khwakh Ba De Sham
- Part of the Insurgency in Khyber Pakhtunkhwa
- The Orakzai Agency highlighted in yellow
Date	Battle phase: (in Kurram) September 2009 – June 2010 (in Orakzai) March 2010 – June 2010 Insurgency phase: June 2010 – January 2011
Location	Kurram Agency and Orakzai Agency, Federally Administered Tribal Areas, Pakistan
Result	Pakistani victory

Belligerents
Pakistan	(Afghanistan) TTP; TNSM

Commanders and leaders
Gen. Ashfaq Parvez Kayani; Lt. Gen. Khalid Rabbani; ACM Rao Suleman; MG Tariq Khan	Hakimullah Mehsud †; Waliur Rehman Mehsud † (Afghanistan) Taj Gul †; Maulana Fazlullah; Mangal Bagh †

Units involved
Pakistan Armed Forces; Pakistan Army; 9th Infantry Division; 315th Paratrooper Brigade; 14th Regular Army Regiment; Pakistan Air Force; No. 25 Squadron; No. 15 Squadron; Civil Armed Forces; Frontier Corps; FC KPK (N)	Unknown

Strength
Frontier Corps and Regular Army: 45,000	Unknown

Casualties and losses
In Orakzai: 70 killed; 213 wounded; In Kurram: 18 killed	In Orakzai: 2,182–2,552 killed; In Kurram: 250+ killed; 333 insurgents captured
- At least 200,000 civilians displaced 3,100 civilians killed in Kurram by Taliban

The Orakzai and Kurram offensive, also known as Operation Khwakh Ba De Sham (Pashto: خوښ به دې شم; transl. I will teach you a lesson (Note: In Pashto, this literally translates to "You'll like me")) was a Pakistani military operation against the Tehrik-i-Taliban in the Orakzai and Kurram agencies of the Federally Administered Tribal Areas of Pakistan that began on 23 March 2010. It was part of the War in North-West Pakistan.

== Timeline ==
=== Start of offensive ===
On 23 March 2010, the Pakistani Army launched a military operation to clear Taliban insurgents from Orakzai Agency. Pakistani general Tariq Khan stated:

This will finish in a couple of months. We'll take care of all of them. We're just waiting for the major operations—like Orakzai and North Waziristan—to finish, to spare us the troops to start changing our methodology. Instead of kinetic, concentrated operations, we start search and cordon and sting operations, for which actually you need more boots on the ground.

On 1 April security forces claimed to have taken complete control of the Lower Orakzai Agency. On 12 April security forces claimed to have extended their control over more areas of Orakzai Agency and were advancing to Upper Orakzai Agency. Militants began fleeing to parts of Tirah Valley, which borders Khyber Agency.

=== End of operations in Lower Orakzai Agency ===
Operations in Lower Orakzai ended with seven thousand troops seizing control of the area on 5 May. With government-provided transport and security, five thousand Pakistani refugee families returned to their homes. About 400 militants were killed in Lower Orakzai; soldiers continued fighting in Central Orakzai.

=== Clashes in Orakzai ===
Between 10 and 19 May, clashes were ongoing in Orakzai. Over these days, a total of 118 insurgents and 11 soldiers were killed.

10 May – At least 9 soldiers and about 30 insurgents were killed in clashes in Orakzai. Military officials described the battle between the insurgents and the army as "fierce" and said that two officers were among the dead.

16 May – "Fighter jets and helicopter gunships attacked militant sanctuaries in the villages of Dabori, Gojar and Kamer Mela in Orakzai, killing 40 suspected insurgents", said Samiullah Khan, a senior government administrator in Orakzai. "Troops attacked militant hide-outs in Koul village, triggering clashes that killed 18 suspected insurgents. Five soldiers and at least 25 militants were wounded in the fighting. The injured militants were taken into custody", said Jehanzeb Khan, a local administrator. By 17 May the total number of dead militants reached 60.

19 May – Another military clash between Pakistani troops and the Taliban killed 28 insurgents and wounded 21. Also killed in the fighting were two Pakistani soldiers.

=== End of offensive in Orakzai ===
On 1 June, the Pakistan Army declared an end to military offensive in Orakzai after announcing it has fully cleared Orakzai of Taliban. However, locals claimed that while Lower Orakzai was cleared, the situation in Central and Upper Orakzai had not changed much. Pakistani authorities reported they were preparing for a full-scale military offensive in North Waziristan, targeting Taliban leadership and al-Qaeda.

=== Operation in Kurram ===
According to the Pakistani Army on 3 June, Taliban insurgents had also been cleared from the neighbouring Kurram Agency.

== Insurgency phase ==
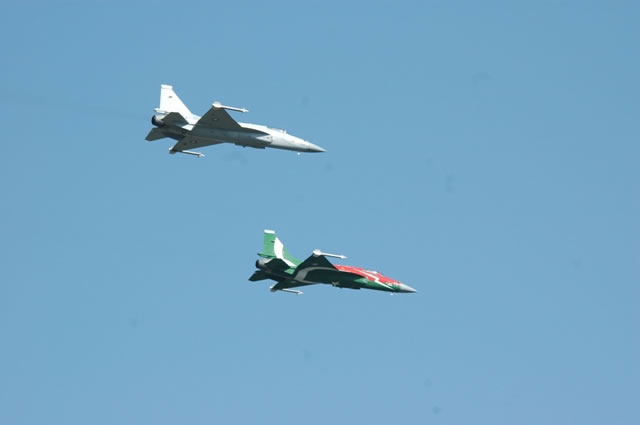
Pakistani fighter jets were actively involved in the operation

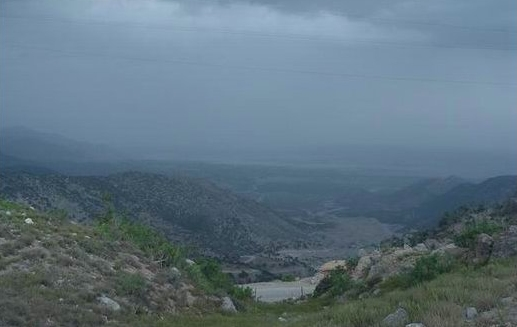
View of Kurram Agency

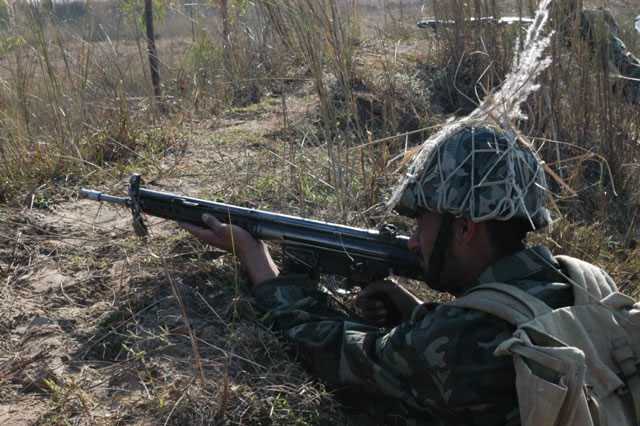
Pakistani soldier

=== 2010 ===
- 13 June – At least 44 Taliban insurgents were killed by the Pakistani army in the ongoing military operation in the tribal areas of Pakistan (military clashes continued mainly in Upper Orakzai and Kurram). In addition, 6 Pakistani soldiers were killed.
- 16 June – Insurgents kidnapped 60 people in Kurram.
- 20 June – A Pakistani air strike killed at least 13 Taliban insurgents in Orakzai.
- 21–22 June – At least 4 Pakistani army soldiers and 43 Taliban insurgents were killed during two days in Orakzai tribal areas.
- 23 June – A new clash in Orakzai killed at least 24 Taliban insurgents and 1 Pakistani paramilitary soldier. Also 9 soldiers were reportedly wounded.
- 24 June – At least 39 Taliban insurgents and 1 Pakistani soldier were killed in Upper Orakzai.
- 26 June – At least 14 Taliban insurgents were killed in Orakzai by Pakistani fighter jet.
- 28 June – At least 12 Taliban insurgents were killed and two security men were injured in military clashes within Upper Orakzai.
- 29 June – At least 66 Taliban insurgents were killed and another 30 injured in airstrikes and clashes with the security forces across the country's north-west. At least 4 Pakistani soldiers were also killed. At least 10 Taliban insurgents were killed by Pakistani Army in Kurram.
- 30 June – At least 20 Taliban insurgents were killed in Orakzai after a Pakistani airstrike.
- 1 July – After a military clash between two armed groups, at least 10 Taliban insurgents were killed. Pakistani sources reported that many of the militants from Orakzai Agency were migrating into the Kurram Agency.
- 4 July – At least 26 Taliban insurgents were killed and many other militants were injured after Pakistani military's jets launched airstrikes within Orakzai, in northwestern Pakistan.
- 5 July – At least 22 Taliban insurgents were killed by Pakistani fighter jets.
- 6 July – Pakistani command reported that 80% of the Kurram Agency had been cleared of insurgents. In ongoing military clashes in Kurram, at least 18 Pakistani soldiers and 96 Taliban insurgents were killed.
- 8 July – At least 14 Taliban insurgents were killed and 10 others were wounded after the Pakistani Armed Forces launched several airstrikes within Orakzai, in northwestern Pakistan.
- 9–10 July – Over two days, at least 27 Taliban insurgents were killed in two separate airstrikes by Pakistani fighter jets in Orakzai.
- 14 July – Pakistani troops killed at least 24 Taliban insurgents; among the dead rebels was a senior Taliban commander, Taj Gul.
- 16 July – At least 22 Taliban insurgents were killed and 13 others were reportedly injured during an attack on their hideouts within Orakzai tribal regions, which was conducted by Pakistani security forces. In Kurram, Taliban fired on the convoy with civilians, killing at least 16 people.
- 18 July – At least 15 Taliban insurgents were killed after Pakistani military fighter jets bombarded militant positions and destroyed eight militant hideouts in the Mamuzai district of Orakzai tribal regions.
- 20 July – At least 42 Taliban insurgents were killed by Pakistani security forces in both Kurram and Orakzai. In one incident Pakistan's military aerially bombarded militant hideouts in the Upper Orakzai region, killing 20 insurgents and wounding a further 15 others. Meanwhile, within the Kurram Agency, security forces targeted Taliban hideouts in a pre-dawn assault. It was later reported that 22 insurgents were killed and 11 others were apparently injured during this operation.
- 21 July – At least 30 Taliban insurgents were killed by the Pakistani Army in Orakzai.
- 22 July – At least 3 Pakistani Army soldiers and 33 Taliban insurgents were killed in Orakzai.
- 23 July – At least 29 Taliban insurgents were killed in airstrikes and military clashes with the Pakistani Army in Orakzai. Meanwhile, it was also reported that 5 Taliban insurgents were apparently killed in clashes with tribesmen in Kurram.
- 24 July – At least 39 Taliban insurgents were killed and many others injured after the Pakistani Army launched a fresh military operation within different areas of Upper Orakzai. It was also reported that 3 Taliban insurgents and 1 tribesman were killed in clashes in Kurram.
- 25 July – At least 23 Taliban insurgents were reportedly killed in Orakzai by fighter jets.
- 26 July – At least 34 Taliban insurgents were killed and 18 injured from Pakistani fighter jet attacks in Orakzai and Kurram.
- 27 July – 14 Taliban insurgents were killed in Pakistani fighter jet attacks in Orakzai.
- 30 July – 12 Taliban insurgents were killed in Kurrum when Pakistani security forces attacked militant positions.
- 1 August – 15 Taliban insurgents were killed by Pakistani Aircraft Fighters in Orakzai.
- 2 August – At least 15 Taliban insurgents were killed by Pakistani Army in Orakzai.
- 3 August – At least 12 Taliban insurgents were killed by Pakistani Security Forces in Upper Orakzai.
- 19 August – At least 14 Taliban insurgents were killed in military clashes with the Pakistani security forces in the Tapu region of Orakzai. At least 1 Pakistani soldier was also killed and another soldier injured.
- 20 August – At least 11 Taliban insurgents were killed by Pakistani Army in Orakzai and Kurram.
- 21 August – At least 8 Taliban insurgents and 1 Pakistani soldier were killed in Orakzai.
- 23 August – At least 2 Taliban insurgents were killed by Pakistani Security Forces in Orakzai. At least 7 citizens were killed when a bomb exploded in Kurram.
- 25 August – At least 7 Taliban insurgents, including an important Taliban commander, were killed and 3 others were reportedly injured in a military clash with the Pakistani military in Upper Orakzai.
- 2 September – At least 15 Taliban insurgents were killed and 10 others were reportedly injured after three militant hideouts in Kurram were destroyed by helicopter gunships of the Pakistani Army.
- 7 September – The Pakistani army claimed it had cleared militants from nearly 90% of Orakzai Agency and it was now helping the area's displaced persons return home.
- 10 September – 7 insurgents open fire on four local high school students in Orakzai, killing them. In an outrage, local civilians and tribesmen tracked and killed the 7 Taliban insurgents.
- 20 September – At least 8 Taliban insurgents were killed and 7 others were reportedly injured when Pakistani helicopter gunships attacked militant positions in Kurram.
- 5 October – At least 18 Taliban insurgents were killed and another 6 were injured when Pakistani helicopter gunships attacked militant positions in central Kurram.
- 21 October – At least 6 Taliban insurgents were killed by a roadside bomb in Kurram. Among the dead rebels was a top Taliban commander, Hakim Khan.
- 22 October – At least 6 Pakistani soldiers were killed by a roadside bomb in Orakzai.
- 23 October – At least 18 Pakistani Taliban insurgents were killed and 12 others injured when the Pakistan Army targeted and destroyed several militant hide-outs, as a result of Pakistani Army troops backed up by helicopter gunships in Orakzai. Meanwhile, it was also reported that Pakistani paramilitary forces pounded suspected militant positions, killing 5 Pakistani Taliban insurgents and injuring 7 others within the neighbouring Kurram Agency.
- 26 October – At least 6 Taliban insurgents were killed by Pakistani Army in Orakzai. It was reported that at least 1 Pakistani soldier was also killed in this clash.
- 27 October – Inspector General Frontier Corps Major General Nadir Zaib said that 90 percent of Orakzai agency areas have been cleared from the terrorists. He added that during the previous few months, 650 Taliban were killed and 250 were captured, with 60 officers killed and 194 sustaining injuries, while security forces were doing a successful operation for the remaining 10 percent. He also stated that Corps Commander Peshawar Lieutenant General Asif Yasin, while briefing the media in Orakzai, said the Pakistan army strongly intended to clear Taliban from the tribal areas by 2012 and that the valley of Tirah would also be cleared of Taliban soon.
- 29 October – 20 Taliban were killed when the Pakistani Army shelled hideouts in Orakzai.
- 1 November – At least 12 Taliban insurgents were killed and 9 others were reportedly injured after three militant hideouts were destroyed by helicopter gunships of the Pakistani Army, in the Orakzai tribal region of north-western Pakistan.
- 6 November – At least 22 Taliban militants were killed by shelling from Pakistani helicopter gunships on hideouts in Orakzai.
- 7 November – At least 5 Taliban insurgents were killed by unidentified armed men in Kurram. Among the dead rebels was a Taliban commander, Hikmat Shah.
- 11 November – At least 15 Taliban insurgents were killed after Pakistani military fighter jets bombarded militant positions and destroyed militant hideouts in Upper Orakzai. A top Taliban commander, Ziaullah, was arrested during this operation. At least 6 Taliban insurgents were killed by Pakistani Army in Orakzai.
- 13 November – At least 8 Taliban insurgents were killed by Pakistani Army in Orakzai.
- 21 November – At least 15 Taliban insurgents were killed by Pakistani Army in Orakzai.
- 25 November – At least 8 Taliban insurgents were killed by Pakistani Army in Orakzai.
- 1 December – At least 10 Taliban militants were killed by the Pakistani Army in Orakzai.
- 6 December – Pakistan security forces stated that more than 85% of Orakzai was cleared and that they were working on clearing the remaining 15%. During a grand peace jirga on December 5 held at Kalaya, Orkazai Agency headquarters, Sunni and Shia tribal elders unanimously agreed to collectively open all roads closed since 2005 and announced to take stern action jointly against elements found guilty of any subversive activity. The jirga was attended, among others, by FC Inspector General Major General Nadir Zaib, Orakzai Political Agent Riaz Mehsud, religious scholars from both Sunni and Shia sects, tribal maliks, chieftains, Sikhs, and elites of the areas. Representatives of the Haqqani network was reportedly involved in talks.
- 23 December – At least 2 Pakistani citizens were injured after Taliban insurgents opened firing on a convoy in Kurram.
- 29 December – At least 7 Taliban insurgents were killed by shelling from Pakistani helicopter gunships on hideouts in Kurram.
- 30 December – At least 20 Taliban insurgents were killed by shelling from Pakistani helicopter gunships on hideouts in Kurram.

=== 2011 ===
- 4 January – Taliban insurgents chopped off a hand of a local resident who was convicted of theft in Orakzai.
- 6 January – At least 6 Taliban insurgents were killed by Pakistani tribal volunteers in Orakzai.
- 7 January – At least 46 Taliban insurgents were arrested by Pakistani army forces in Kurram.
- 11 January – At least 5 Taliban insurgents were killed by unspecified militants in Kurram.
- 21 January – According to sources most of the areas of Orakzai Agency have been cleared of militants, while about 10% of the area (including Sefal Darra, Kasha, Wood Mela, Mamozai, and Ahang) was still under their control.

== See also ==
- Operation Rah-e-Nijat
- KPK Insurgency
- Operation Swift Retort
