= Vice Chief of the Army Staff (Pakistan) =

Pakistan Army's vice chief; 1969 – 2007

Vice chief of the Army Staff

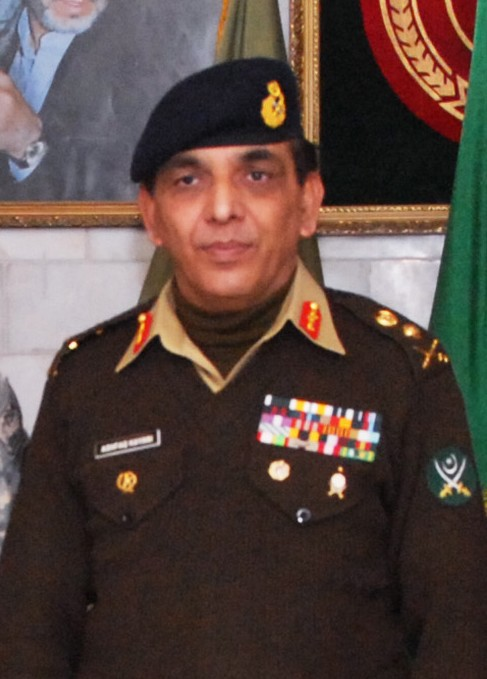
- Last VCOAS; General Ashfaq Parvez Kayani; 8 October 2007 – 28 November 2007
- Type: Second in command of Pakistan army
- Status: Vacant
- Abbreviation: VCOAS
- Reports to: Chief of the Army Staff
- Term length: 3 years, Renewable once
- Formation: 25 March 1969; 57 years ago
- First holder: General Abdul Hamid Khan
- Final holder: General Ashfaq Parvez Kayani
- Abolished: 28 November 2007; 18 years ago
- Deputy: Deputy Chief of the Army Staff

The Vice chief of the Army Staff (VCOAS) was an office in Pakistan Army that was principal deputy and second-in-command (S-in-C) of the Pakistan Army, reporting under the Chief of the Army Staff. The position was created in the existence of army chief is simultaneously the President of Pakistan, having taken over by imposing martial law against the elected civilian government. The post is now obsolete and no longer in existence with the army – the Chief of the General Staff now serves as the second-in-command in the army leadership.

The function and scope of the vice army chief was to "exercise and perform all the powers and functions vested in the chief of army staff under the law. rules, regulations, orders, and instructions for the time being in the force."

The vice army chiefs are considered to be the principal commanders of the army but not altogether, as the vice army chief has to report to the army chief, specifically in taking decisions regarding promotions. The post of the vice army chief is a very senior position and the appointment holder is a four-star general.

== List of Vice Chiefs Of Army Staff ==
All persons mentioned below have served as the Vice Chief of the Army Staff with distinction of General Abdul Hamid Khan who acted as the 'Chief of Staff' (COS) of the army under General Yahya Khan who was the President of Pakistan and also the holder of the post of Commander in Chief of the Pakistan Army. General Ashfaq Parvez Kayani was the last vice chief of army staff till date.

No.	Portrait	Name (Birth–Death)	Term of office			Unit of commission	Ref.
No.	Portrait	Name (Birth–Death)	Took office	Left office	Time in office	Unit of commission	Ref.
–		General; Abdul Hamid Khan HQA, SPk (1917–1984)	25 March 1969	20 December 1971	2 years, 270 days	10th Baloch	
1		General; Sawar Khan NI(M) (1924–2023)	13 April 1980	22 March 1984	3 years, 344 days	1st (SP) Med Regt Arty (FF)	
2		General; Khalid Mahmud Arif NI(M), SBt (1930–2010)	23 March 1984	29 March 1987	3 years, 6 days	11th Cavalry (FF)	
3		General; Mirza Aslam Beg NI(M), SBt (born 1931)	29 March 1987	17 August 1988	1 year, 141 days	16th Baloch	
4		General; Yusaf Khan NI(M) (born 1948)	8 October 2001	6 October 2004	2 years, 364 days	Guides Cavalry	
5		General; Ahsan Saleem Hayat NI(M) (born 1948)	7 October 2004	7 October 2007	3 years, 0 days	33rd Cavalry	
6		General; Ashfaq Parvez Kayani NI(M), HI(M) (born 1952)	8 October 2007	28 November 2007	52 days	5th Baloch	

== See also ==
- Vice Chief of the Air Staff (Pakistan)
- Vice Chief of the Naval Staff (Pakistan)
