= Abdul Hamid Khan (general) =

Pakistani general

Abdul Hamid Khan HQA SPk SQA NeT
- عبد الحمید خاں
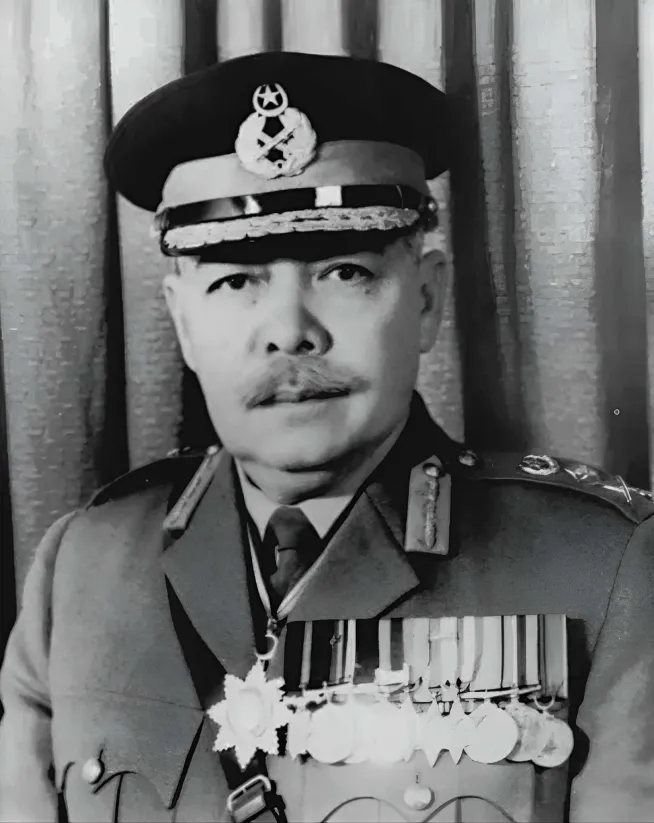
- Official Military portrait, 1971

5th Chief of Staff of the Pakistan Army
- De facto Commander-in-Chief (Note: Although Abdul Hamid Khan officially held the position of Chief of Staff (CoS), formally the Deputy Commander-in-Chief, he was granted the full powers of the Commander-in-Chief. During the Bangladesh War and the subsequent India–Pakistan war of 1971, he effectively served as the acting Commander-in-Chief and is officially recognised as the Army’s de facto leader at the time.); 26 March 1969 – 20 December 1971
- President: Yahya Khan
- Preceded by: Bakhtiar Rana
- Succeeded by: Sawar Khan (As Vice Chief of Army Staff)

15th Interior Minister of Pakistan Deputy Chief Martial Law Administrator
- In office 15 April 1969 – 3 August 1969
- Preceded by: Afzal Rahman Khan
- Succeeded by: Abdur Rashid Khan

Personal details
- Born: Abdul Hamid Khan; 29 April 1917 Maymyo, Burma, British India (present-day Myanmar)
- Died: 21 July 1983 (aged 66) Combined Military Hospital, Rawalpindi, Punjab, Pakistan
- Resting place: Lahore Military Cemetery
- Relations: Brig. Tariq Hamid Khan (son)
- Children: 3 sons
- Education: Government College Lahore (BA); Indian Military Academy
- Nickname(s): "Ham" "Silent Buddha"

Military service
- Allegiance: British India; Pakistan
- Branch/service: (British Raj) British Indian Army (1939–1947); Pakistan Army (1947–1971)
- Years of service: 1939—1971
- Rank: General
- Unit: 10th Baloch Regiment (S/No. PA – 95)
- Commands: Chief of Staff, Pakistan Army; Mangla I Corps; 11th Infantry Division
- Battles/wars: World War II; Mediterranean theatre; Indo-Pakistani War of 1965; Battle of Kasur; Battle of Khemkaran; Bangladesh Liberation War; Operation Searchlight; Indo-Pakistani War of 1971
- Awards: Hilal-i-Quaid-e-Azam; Sitara-i-Pakistan; Sitara-i-Quaid-e-Azam; Order of the Crown

General Abdul Hamid Khan (Note: Punjabi: عبدُ ٱلْحَمِيد خاں, romanized: ʿAbd al-Ḥamīd Khā̃) (29 April 1917 – 21 July 1983) was a Pakistani four-star rank general who served as the de facto Commander-in-Chief of the Pakistan army from 1969 to 1971. He led the Army during the Bangladesh Liberation War and the India–Pakistan war of 1971. He was also the Deputy Chief Martial Law Administrator under Yahya Khan.

Born in British Burma, Khan was commissioned into the British Indian Army in 1939. After serving in the Mediterranean theatre during the Second World War, he went on to command the 10th, 11th, and 15th infantry divisions of the Pakistan Army. During the Indo-Pakistani war of 1965, he led Pakistan to multiple victories on the Punjab Front. In 1966, he assumed command of the I Corps.

In the aftermath of the 1968-69 Pakistan revolution and the resignation of Ayub Khan, he was made the Chief of Staff of the Pakistan Army and was part of the Council of Administration within the Yahya Khan government. During the Bangladesh War and Indo-Pakistani war of 1971, he was the acting Commander-in-Chief of the Pakistan Army and headed the General Headquarters. He would also act as the Chief Martial Law Administrator of the country in the absence of the President.

He is widely regarded as the closest person to Yahya Khan during his presidency. He is also accused for complicity in the 1971 Bangladesh genocide.

== Early life and education ==
Abdul Hamid Khan was born on 29 April 1917 in Maymyo, British Burma, to a Punjabi-Kashmiri father and a Burmese mother. His father was an administrative officer from Gujrat working for the British Indian Government in Burma. Hamid Khan never publicly identified his mother who was a house servant from Mandalay.

Khan completed his early education in Mandalay before moving to Punjab in British india to pursue higher studies. Here he attended Government College Lahore, where he graduated with a Bachelor's degree.

Later, he enrolled into the Indian Military Academy in Dehra Dun. He was classmates with Yahya Khan and Jagjit Singh Aurora. After passing out of his term, he was commissioned into the British Indian Army as a second lieutenant on the Special List on 15 July 1939.

== Military career (1939–1971) ==
=== British Indian Army & World War Two ===
After being commissioned in July 1939, Abdul Hamid Khan was initially attached to the Somerset Light Infantry for experience from 11 August 1939. His date of commission was later antedated to 28 August 1938 and he was promoted to lieutenant on 28 November 1940. He was admitted to the British Indian Army on 27 August 1940. He was appointed acting captain then temporary captain on 23 December 1940. He had been posted to 3rd battalion 10th Baluch Regiment by October 1942.

During World War II, he fought on the Mediterranean and Middle eastern fronts. As a captain, Hamid Khan led an infantry company during the Battle of El Alamein. He also saw action in Italy towards the end of the war, where he was captured as a Prisoner of war.

He was promoted to war substantive captain and temporary major on 3 February 1944. He was briefly an acting lieutenant-colonel from 15 August to 18 October 1945. He had attended a wartime staff course.

=== Pakistan Army ===
During the partition of India, he opted for Pakistan and joined the newly created Pakistan Army, in 1947 he was promoted to lieutenant-colonel and became commanding officer of 6th battalion, Baluch Regiment, he commanded from April 1948 to November 1948. Later he was appointed commanding officer of 3rd battalion, Baluch Regiment, he served in this post from November 1948 to December 1949.

On 16 August 1952, Colonel Abdul Hamid Khan was appointed as the military secretary to the Commander-in-Chief of the Pakistan Army, General Ayub Khan.

In 1958, Hamid Khan was promoted to Major-General and served as the Director of military training, a brigadiers post, from 1958 to 1961. The name was changed to 'Director-general' (DGMT) for Khans appointment, as President Ayub Khan had "reposed great faith" in him. He was tasked with planning new organization and tactics for the army.

==== 1965 war with India ====
During the 1965 Indo-Pakistani War, then Major General Khan served as the General Officer Commanding (GOC) of 11th Infantry Division at Kasur. This division in addition to 10th Infantry Division under Major General Sarfaraz Khan repelled the Indian thrust at Lahore on 6 September 1965. Following victory at the Battle of Kasur, his division pushed the Indians back to the border and captured the district of Khemkaran in Indian Punjab, though further advances were checked. He then was able to repel multiple counter-attacks by the Indian Army in an effort to retake Khemkaran.

==== Yahya Khan Regime ====
After the Indo-Pak war of 1965, Khan was promoted to lieutenant general and served as the commander of I Corps, Pakistan's primary strike formation and a strategically important garrison town near the Indian border. Then based in Kharian (it is currently based in Mangla) his appointment as corps commander placed him in charge of key military operations and enhanced his prominence in the army hierarchy.

Khan was a close and trusted ally of General Yahya Khan, with their friendship tracing back to their early years in the military. Both officers shared a long-standing association, having served together in various capacities throughout their careers. This camaraderie and trust played a significant role in Hamid Khan’s rise through the ranks, particularly during Yahya Khan’s tenure as the Commander-in-Chief of the Pakistan Army and later as President of Pakistan.

In March 1969, Pakistan experienced severe political unrest and street protests against the regime of President Ayub Khan, largely driven by dissatisfaction with his policies and governance. Amid this chaos, General Yahya Khan, the then Commander-in-Chief of the Pakistan Army, removed Ayub and imposed martial law on 25 March 1969. Yahya took over as President of Pakistan, and in recognition of his loyalty and leadership, Lt. Gen. Hamid Khan was appointed to multiple roles.

After martial law was imposed by General Yahya Khan on 25 March 1969, Lieutenant General Hamid was appointed Deputy Martial Law Administrator (DMLA) of the country and was a central figure within the martial law council of administration.

On 26 March, he was appointed as the Chief of Staff of the Pakistan Army or in another sense the de facto Commander-in-Chief of the army in place of Yahya as he was the president. He would also act as the Chief Martial Law Administrator of the country in the absence of Yahya Khan.

During that time he briefly held the cabinet portfolio of Home Affairs for four months. He was promoted to full general on 1 January 1971, as a new years gift from Yahya Khan.

Hamid Khan was a central figure in Yahya's military government along with several active duty military officials:

Yahya Khan administration
Ministers	Portrait	Ministries and departments	Inter-services
General Yahya Khan		President and Chief Martial Law Administrator; Information and Broadcasting; Law and Justice; Foreign and Defence	Pakistan Army
General Abdul Hamid Khan		Deputy CMLA; Interior and Kashmir Affairs	Pakistan Army
Vice-Admiral S. M. Ahsan		Deputy CMLA; Finance and Planning Commission; Statistics, Commerce, and Industry	Pakistan Navy
Air Marshal Nur Khan		Deputy CMLA; Communications and Health; Labour and Science and Technology	Pakistan Air Force

==== Foreign diplomacy ====
General Abdul Hamid Khan led a Pakistani good-will delegation to Peking on 28 September 1969. During his week-long state visit, he met and held talks with Chinese Premier Zhou Enlai. He took part in China's National Day celebrations.

On 19 October 1969, he also led a week-long military mission in Saudi Arabia, where toured military sites and other institutions. He held a meeting with King Faisal of Saudi Arabia. In April 1970, he headed another week-long mission to Algeria, where he made a televised statement affirming Pakistan's support to the "just struggle" of the Palestinian people.

On 16 February 1971, General Hamid officially opened the 400-mile Karakoram Highway over the Khunjerab Pass, establishing a vital road link between Pakistan and China connecting Lhasa to Karachi. During a ceremony in Baltit with Chinese ministers, he described the highway as the beginning of a "new era of friendship" with China in a speech to officials of both countries, including Chinese communications minister Yang Chieh.

On 9 July 1971, Abdul Hamid Khan met US national security advisor Henry Kissinger at Nathia Gali and had lunch with him. The pair discussed American military aid to Pakistan in the lead of the war in East Pakistan. He also took part in a state luncheon hosted in Rawalpindi for a Chinese delegation in November 1971.

=== 1971 war with India ===
On 30 November 1971, Abdul Hamid Khan met with Pakistani president Yahya Khan and the Chief of the General Staff, Lieutenant General Gul Hassan Khan, where they planned and decided to authorize the launch of Operation Chengiz Khan, which occurred on 3 December 1971. It was a series preemptive strikes conducted by the Pakistan Air Force on Indian airbases, aimed at crippling Indian airpower and initiating hostilities in the west. The operation inflicted limited damage.

==== Western Front ====
His GHQ authorized the offensive in Chhamb under Major-General Iftikhar Janjua, which resulted in territorial gains. He also directed the attempted advance towards Longewala, which was described as a "favourite project" of Hamid by some sources, though there is disagreement over this claim. The effort was ultimately repelled by Indian forces due to a lack of air support on the pakistani side.

After the 18th division's unsuccessful advance at Longewala, General Hamid had split the 33rd Infantry division and spread its formations across various sectors in Sindh. This decision by Hamid had proved to be tactful as the Sindh was, according to Agha Humayun Amin, was highly underdefended and vulnerable to Indian exploitation. Though Hamid's defensive reapproach had, supposedly, reduced Lieutenant-General Tikka Khan's scope of potential gains in India as part of a counterattack.

Hamid Khan had also planned to allow India to occupy the BRB Canal so that he could launch a counter offensive by his primary strike force, the I Corps in order to secure Jammu Tawi and Poonch

Around the 8th of December, General Hamid Khan was called on by visiting French strategist General Andre Beaufre to gain an official view of Pakistan’s military situation. Hamid tasked his staff to assist Beaufre in touring the operational areas. However, Hamid Khan played a role in delaying the II Corps offensive into the Indian state of Punjab due to conflicting agreements within Army Command. This led President Yahya Khan to stall the operation.

The II Corps offensive was to commence on the 16th of December. The plan involved advancing east from Bahawalnagar towards Bhatinda and Ludhiana. Due to the need to split the 33rd division, the plan had to be revised. At 9 a.m. on 13 December, General Hamid gave his approval for launching the offensive. Under his directive, major elements of the IV Corps began mobilization on 14 December along the Ravi River. In addition, the 105th Brigade, which came under the II Corps, had made advances into Indian territory during the Battle of Fazilka and had repelled multiple counterattacks. However, due to subsequent orders to halt movements, the offensive was delayed for 24 hours. After Yahya Khan's address to the nation on the 16th about agreeing to the ceasefire in the East, General Hamid ordered Tikka Khan to 'freeze.' Ultimately, the offensive did not proceed before the ceasefire came into effect on December 17, 1971.

==== Eastern Front ====
General Hamid Khan was scheduled to visit East Pakistan on 2 December to review the situation, but the visit was cancelled and war commenced a day later. General Hamid maintained regular communication with the eastern sector throughout the war, sending numerous signals to the Governor of East Pakistan and the Eastern Command.

Lieutenant-General A.A.K. Niazi, the Commander of the Pakistani Eastern Command had initially refused to surrender despite mounting pressure and a directive by Yahya Khan. Though no official order was ever issued from Islamabad, General Hamid Khan sent a message to Niazi advising to accept the proposal by the Indian Forces but formally leaving the final decision to Niazi himself. Prior to this, Hamid had sent a telegram to Niazi on 10 December advising him to destroy as much military equipment as they could to avoid it falling into enemy hands.

General Hamid had also sent signals to the Governor of East Pakistan, Dr. Abdul Motaleb Malik, delegating the final decision to Malik and advising him to find a political settlement or negotiate a ceasefire, with Niazi only to provide military advice. Hamid's signal was perceived as a permission to surrender by the eastern garrison. Governor Malik resigned after the Indian Airforce bombed the Government House in Dacca.

According to A.A.K. Niazi, after his initial refusals to lay down arms, it was General Hamid and Air Marshal Abdur Rahim Khan who telephoned him on the 15th of December and ordered him to surrender to "save West Pakistan.” The Hamoodur Rahman Commission, however, rejected this claim, noting that while General Hamid had "suggested" that Niazi accept the Indian terms of surrender, he had explicitly left the decision to Niazi. The Commission concluded that Niazi had been authorised but not ordered to surrender, and dismissed his assertion that the suggestion led to the final decision.

After the surrender, General Hamid was contacted by Major-General Rao Farman Ali, who informed him of alleged abuses committed by intelligence agencies and also requested Hamid to launch an investigation into the murder of a National Awami Party treasurer.

As head of the army and the military operations during the Bangladesh Liberation War and the India–Pakistan war of 1971, he played a central role in directing Pakistan's Western front campaigns. He oversaw the launch of Operation Chengiz Khan, a preemptive strike on Indian airbases, aimed at crippling Indian airpower and initiating hostilities. Despite extensive planning, the operation inflicted only limited damage.

== Personality ==
Former foreign secretary Sultan Mohammed Khan, described Hamid:

"General Hamid was a good listener and spoke little. General Yahya often called him the "Silent Buddha". But he had a keen sense of humour, was warm-hearted, modest, shrewd and often down to earth in his judgment of men and human affairs. He enjoyed the complete trust of the President."

== In popular culture ==
- In the 2023 Indian film Sam Bahadur, Khan is portrayed by Manish Bomba.
- in the 2023 Indian film IB 71, which is based on the 1971 Indian Airlines hijacking, he is portrayed by Hobby Dhaliwal.
- In the 2026 Indian film Border 2, he is portrayed by Soumyarka Gupta.

== Dates of rank ==
Insignia	Rank	Date
	General	1 January 1971
	Lieutenant General	5 May 1966
	Major General	20 May 1958 (Note: Upon independence in 1947, Pakistan became a Dominion within the British Commonwealth of Nations. As a result, the rank insignia of the British Army, incorporating the Tudor Crown and four-pointed Bath Star ("pip"), was retained, as George VI remained commander-in-chief of the Pakistan Armed Forces. In 1956, when Pakistan became a republic, the crescent star replaced the crown, with a newly modelled "pip".)
	Brigadier	11 February 1954
	Lieutenant Colonel	1 September 1947
	Major (Temporary)	3 February 1944
	Captain (Temporary)	23 December 1940
	Lieutenant	28 November 1940
	Second Lieutenant	15 July 1939

== Awards and decorations ==
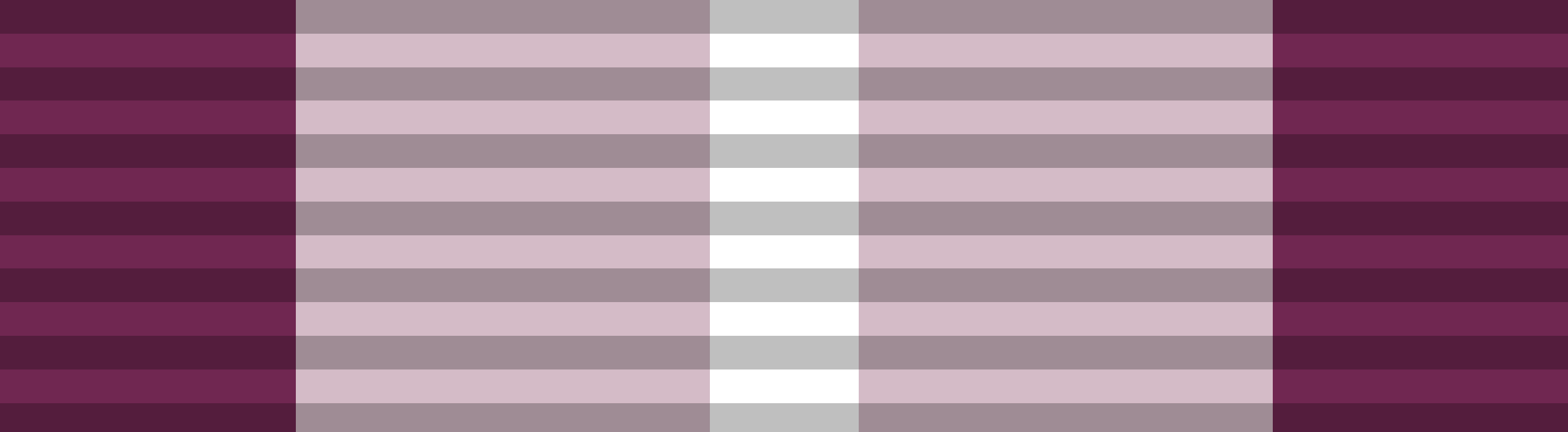
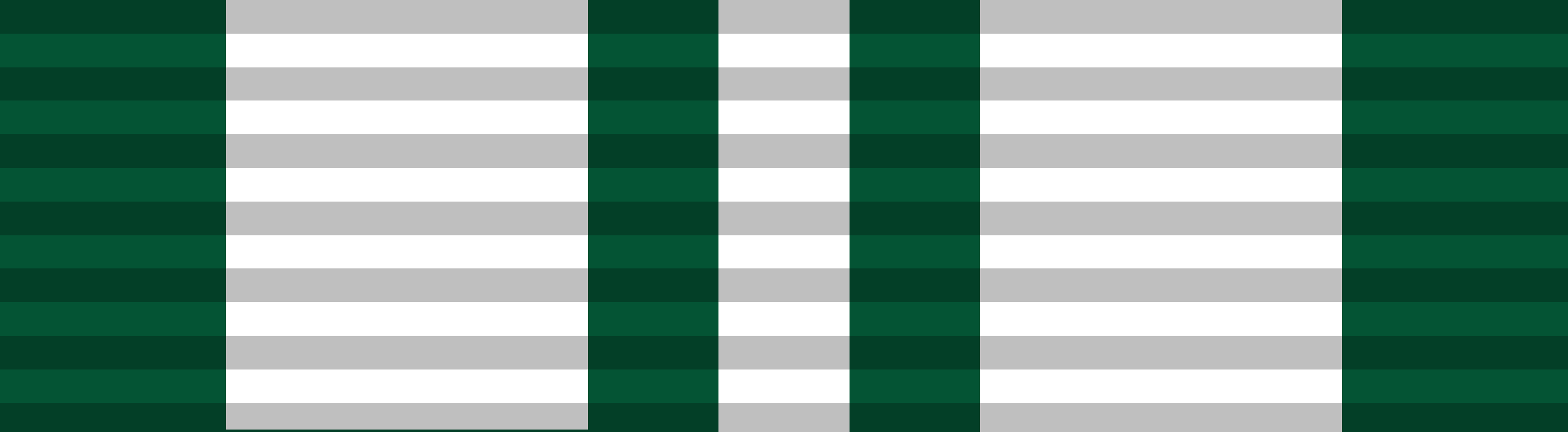
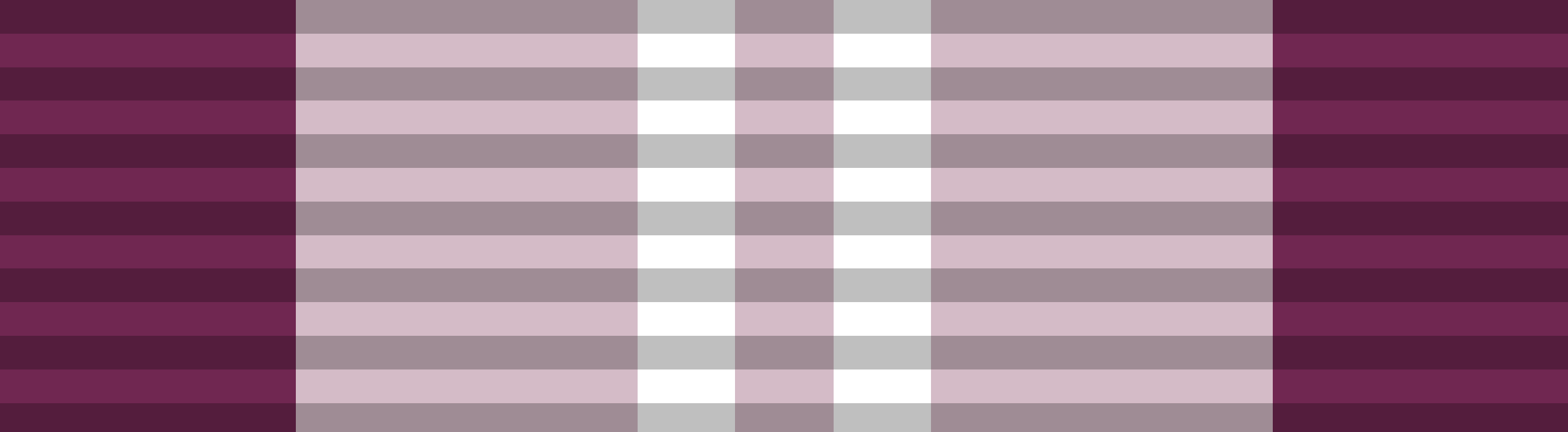

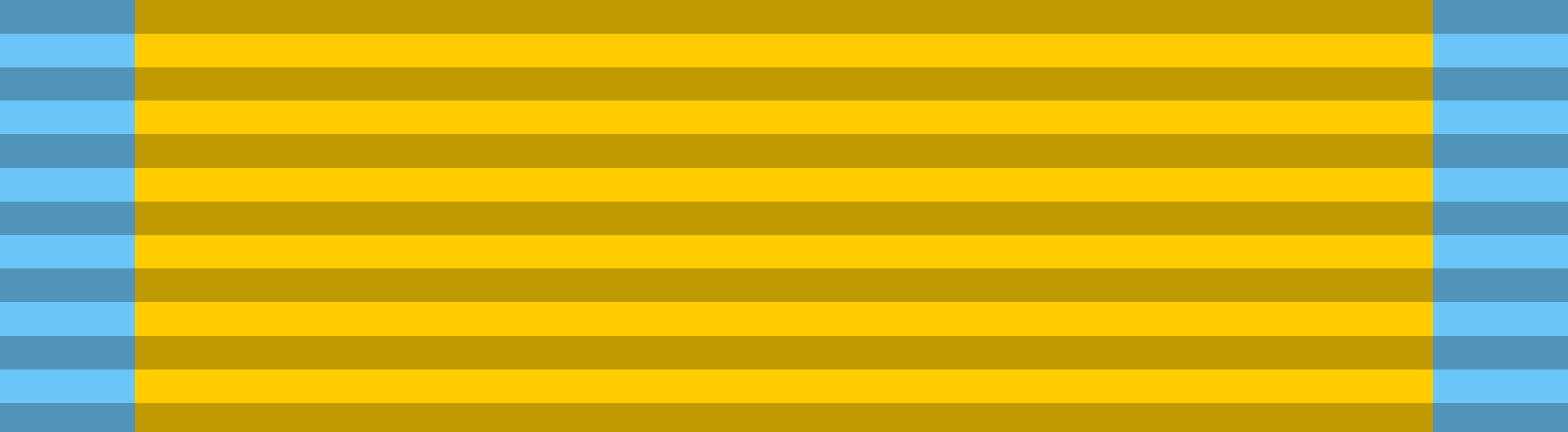

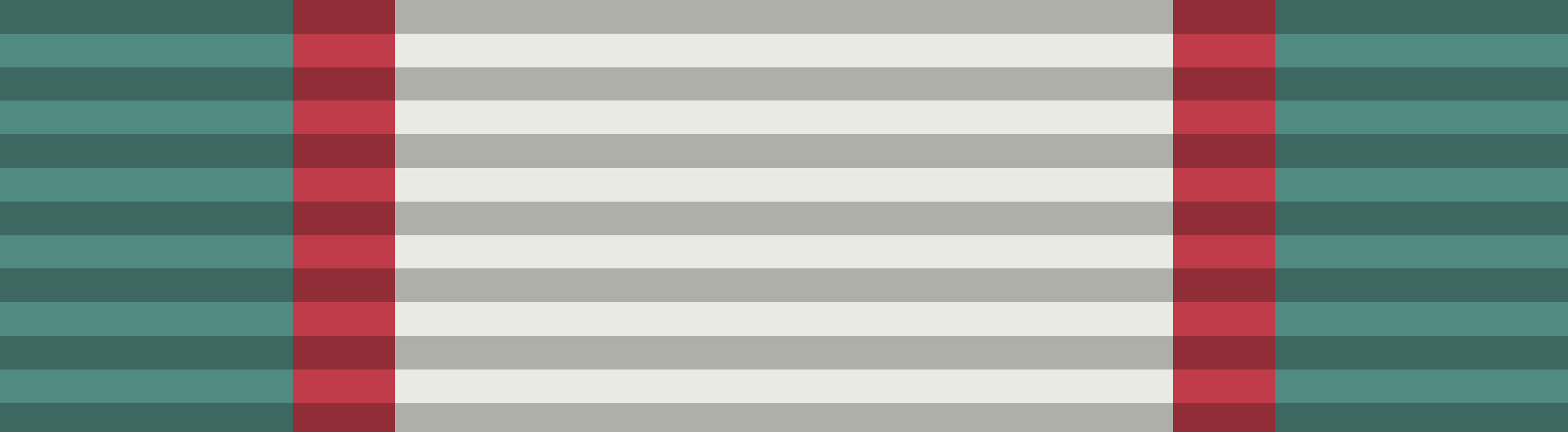

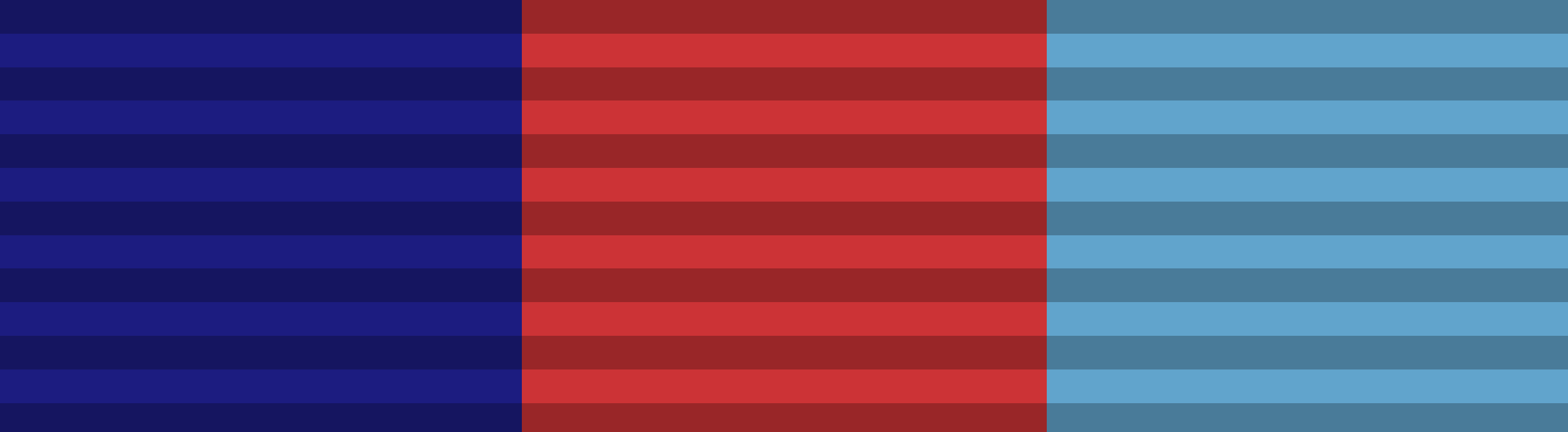

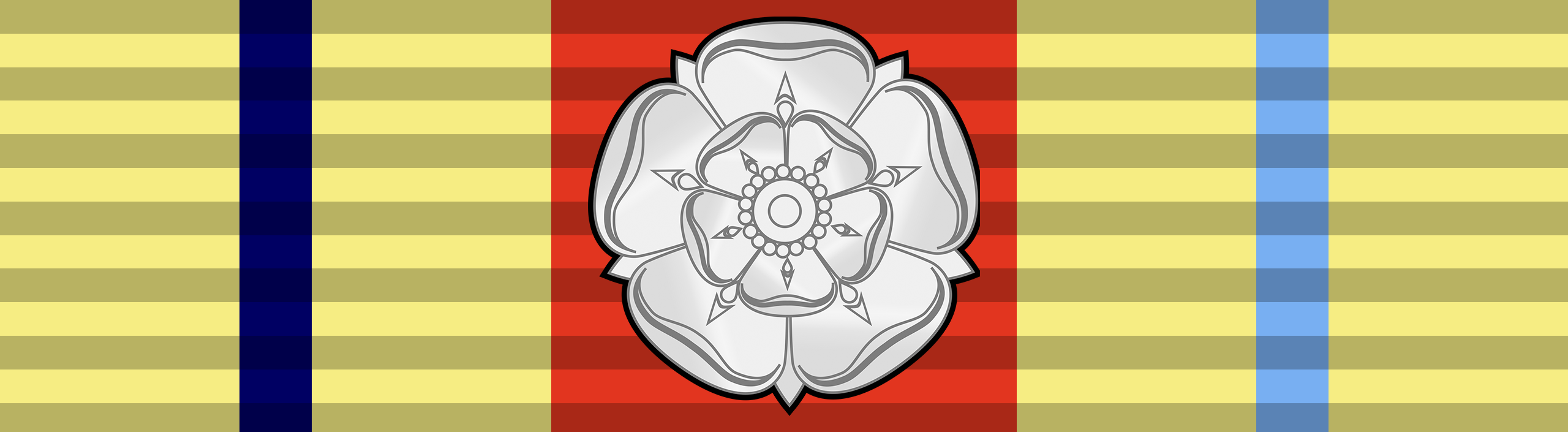

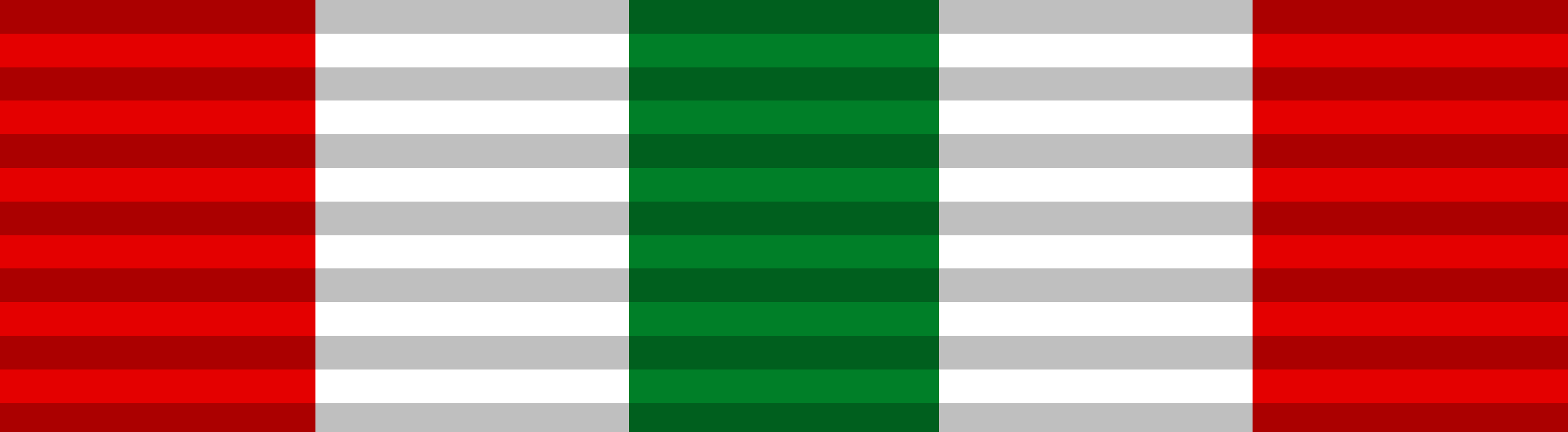

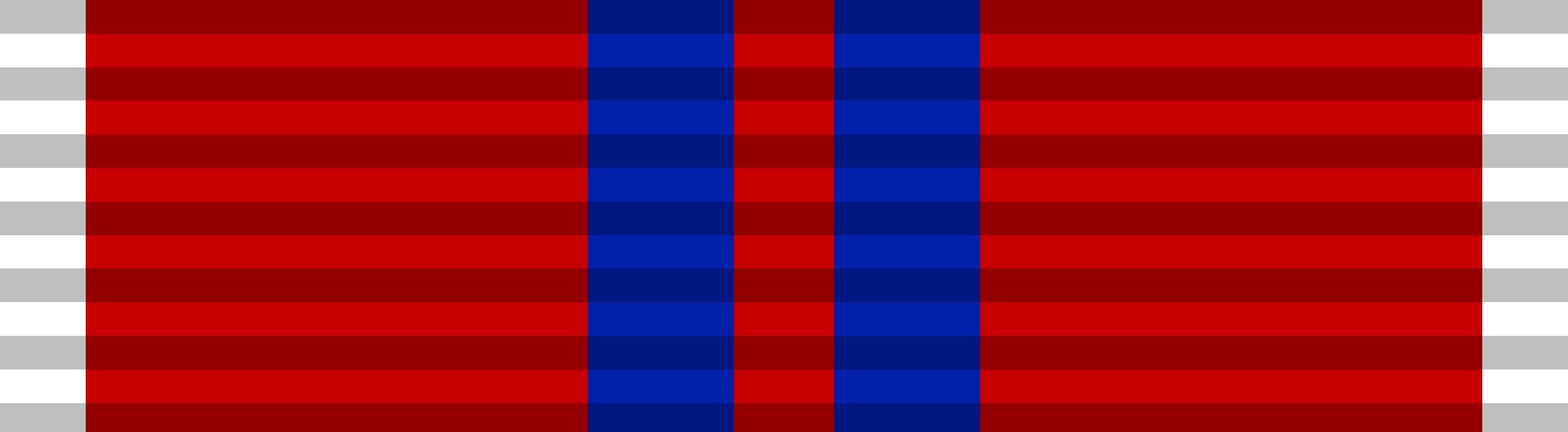

Hilal-e-Quaid-e-Azam (Crescent of the Great Leader) (HQA)	Sitara-e-Pakistan (Star of Pakistan) (SPk)		Sitara-e-Quaid-e-Azam (Star of the Great Leader) (SQA)				
Sitara-e-Harb 1965 War (War Star 1965)	Tamgha-e-Jang 1965 War (War Medal 1965)	Pakistan Tamgha (Pakistan Medal) 1947	Tamgha-e-Jamhuria (Republic Commemoration Medal) 1956				
Order of the Crown (Pahlavi Iran)	India General Service Medal (1936) North West Frontier 1937–39 Clasp	1939-1945 Star	Africa Star (with Rosette)	Italy Star	Defence Medal	War Medal 1939-1945	Queen Elizabeth II Coronation Medal (1953)

=== Foreign Decorations ===
Foreign Awards
UK	1939-1945 Star
UK	Africa Star
UK	Italy Star
UK	Defence Medal
UK	War Medal 1939-1945
UK	Queen Elizabeth II Coronation Medal
Imperial Iran	Order of the Crown

== Notes ==
Political offices
Preceded by Afzal Rahman Khan	Interior Minister of Pakistan; 1969	Succeeded by Sardar Abdur Rashid Khan
