= Chief of Staff of the Pakistan Army =

Chief of Staff, Pakistan Army
- چیف آف اسٹاف
- Flag of the Pakistan Army
- Ministry of Defence; Army Secretariat-I at MoD
- Status: Deputy C-in-C
- Abbreviation: CoS
- Member of: General Headquarters
- Reports to: Commander-in-Chief
- Appointer: Governor-General, Prime Minister or President of Pakistan
- Term length: Not fixed
- Constituting instrument: Article
- Precursor: Deputy Chief of the General Staff
- Formation: 15 August 1947; 79 years ago
- First holder: General Douglas Gracey
- Final holder: General Abdul Hamid Khan
- Abolished: 20 December 1971; 54 years ago
- Succession: Vice Chief of the Army Staff
- Deputy: Vice Chief of Staff

The Chief of Staff of the Pakistan Army was a senior military position that existed from 1947 to 1971, responsible for assisting the Commander-in-Chief of the Pakistan Army in operational, administrative, and organisational matters. The COS was essentially the second-in-command of the army during this period. This position was abolished in 1971.

The Chief of Staff would also perform the duties and roles of the C-in-C at certain times. Essentially becoming the Acting or De facto C-in-C. This was executed most notably by Douglas Gracey during the First Kashmir War and Abdul Hamid Khan during the Bangladesh Liberation War.

== History ==
The position of Chief of Staff was established in 1947, after the Independence of Pakistan, to manage the administrative and operational duties of the newly formed Pakistan Army.

The role of the COS was to serve as the principal staff officer to the Commander-in-Chief (C-in-C), ensuring the smooth functioning of military operations, planning, logistics, and strategic decision-making.

During the early years of Pakistan, the army's leadership was shaped by British-trained officers. The first few individuals to serve as Chief of Staff were instrumental in establishing the army's organizational structure, as well as coordinating operations during significant events such as the Indo-Pakistani war of 1947–1948 and later conflicts.

The position of Chief of Staff was abolished in 1971 after the Indo-Pakistani war of 1971, and its responsibilities were redistributed among senior officers within General Headquarters (GHQ).

The structural reorganization aimed to streamline the command hierarchy, with the Chief of Army Staff (COAS) emerging as the sole head of the army in 1972 replacing the Commander-in-Chief (C-in-C).

== List of former Chiefs of Staff ==
No.	Portrait	Chief of Army Staff	Took office	Left office	Time in office	Unit of Commission
01	Douglas Gracey	General; Douglas Gracey (1894–1964)	14 August 1947	15 February 1948	185 days	Gorkha Rifles
02	Ross Cairns McCay	Lieutenant general Ross Cairns McCay (1895–1969)	15 February 1948	2 May 1951	3 years, 76 days	Rajputana Rifles
03	Nasir Ali Khan	Lieutenant General; Nasir Ali Khan	2 May 1951	28 February 1957	5 years, 302 days	Rajput Regiment
04	Musa Khan	General; Musa Khan (1908–1991)	28 February 1957	28 October 1958	1 year, 242 days	Hazara Pioneers
05	Bakhtiar Rana	Lieutenant General; Bakhtiar Rana (1910–1996)	20 September 1966	25 March 1969	2 years, 186 days	Frontier Force Regiment
06	Abdul Hamid Khan	General; Abdul Hamid Khan (1917–1983)	25 March 1969	20 December 1971	2 years, 270 days	Baloch Regiment

== Abolition of the Position ==
In 1971, following the Bangladesh Liberation War and the subsequent restructuring of the Pakistan Army, the position of Chief of Staff was discontinued. This move was part of a broader effort to centralize authority under the Chief of Army Staff (COAS), who became the sole head of the Pakistan Army in 1972. The responsibilities of the COS were distributed among various departments and senior staff officers within the General Headquarters (GHQ).

== Legacy ==
The role of the Chief of Staff played a significant part in the development of the Pakistan Army's early command structure. The position bridged the gap between strategic planning and operational execution, ensuring smooth coordination within the military. While the position no longer exists, its impact on the army's organizational evolution remains notable in Pakistan's military history.
