= Nasir Ali Khan =

Pakistani general (born 1906)

Chief of Staff, Pakistan Army
- In office 2 May 1951 – 28 February 1957
- Preceded by: Lt. Gen. Ross McCay
- Succeeded by: Lt. Gen. Musa Khan
- Commander-in-Chief: General Ayub Khan

Personal details
- Born: 16 December 1906
- Died: ?
- Education: Royal Military College, Sandhurst; Staff College, Quetta; Imperial Defence College

Military service
- Allegiance: British India; Pakistan
- Branch/service: British Indian Army (1926–1947); Pakistan Army (1947–1957)
- Years of service: 1928—1957
- Rank: Lieutenant General
- Unit: Cheshire Regiment; Rajput Regiment
- Battles/wars: Mohmand campaign of 1935; World War II; Burma campaign

Nasir Ali Khan (born 16 December 1906) was a Pakistani former three-star rank general who served as the first native Chief of Staff of the Pakistan Army from May 1951 to February 1957.

== Early life ==
Nasir Ali Khan was born on 16 December 1906. He had a sister named Sughra.

== Military career ==
=== British Indian Army (1926–1947) ===
Nasir Ali Khan was commissioned into the British Indian Army from the Royal Military College, Sandhurst in 1928. After a brief period with the Cheshire Regiment in Poona, he was posted to the 1st Rajput Regiment.

He saw active service on the North-West Frontier in and participated in the Mohmand operations in 1935 with the Peshawar Brigade, which was commanded by General Auchinleck. On 16 February 1934, Lieutenant Nasir Ali Khan was appointed Quartermaster of the 1st battalion of the 7th Rajput Regiment.

At the outbreak of World War II in 1939, Khan was serving as Administrative Commandant of the 11th Rajput Regiment and conducted railway security duties in India. He attended the Staff College, Quetta in late 1940 and later served on the staff of General Headquarters. He subsequently served with the 20th Division in Bangalore and Ceylon before being posted to the 9th Rajput Regiment, which he commanded in 1944.

As a Lieutenant-Colonel, Nasir Ali Khan was among the officers appointed to the General Court Martial from 5 November 1945 to 31 December 1945, which held the trial of three officers of the Indian National Army (INA) at Delhi's Red Fort. The tribunal, presided over by Major General Alan Bruce Blaxland, was composed of seven officers tasked with trying Captain Shah Nawaz Khan, Captain Prem Sahgal, and Lieutenant Gurbaksh Singh Dhillon on charges arising from their service in the INA under Indian anti-colonial nationalist Subhas Chandra Bose.

In April 1946, he was posted to General Headquarters as an Assistant Military Secretary. In March 1947, Colonel Nasir Ali Khan was appointed Deputy Military Secretary at General Headquarters and became the first Indian officer to hold the appointment.

=== Pakistan Army (1947–1957) ===
Following the Partition of British India in 1947, Nasir Ali Khan joined the Pakistan Army.

As a Major General, Khan was the Quartermaster general in 1950. He completed the 5th post-war course at the Imperial Defence College, which concluded on 15 December 1950.

On 2 May 1951, he was promoted to the rank of Lieutenant General and appointed Chief of Staff of the Army. He served in this role until his retirement on 28 February 1957 and was succeeded by Lt. General Musa Khan.

== Later life ==
He was appointed as the Chairman of the West Pakistan Public Service Commission on 31 March 1959. He was a resident of Gulberg, Lahore.
