= Battle of Kasur (1965) =

Major Battle during the Indo-Pakistani War of 1965

- Part of Indo-Pakistani War of 1965
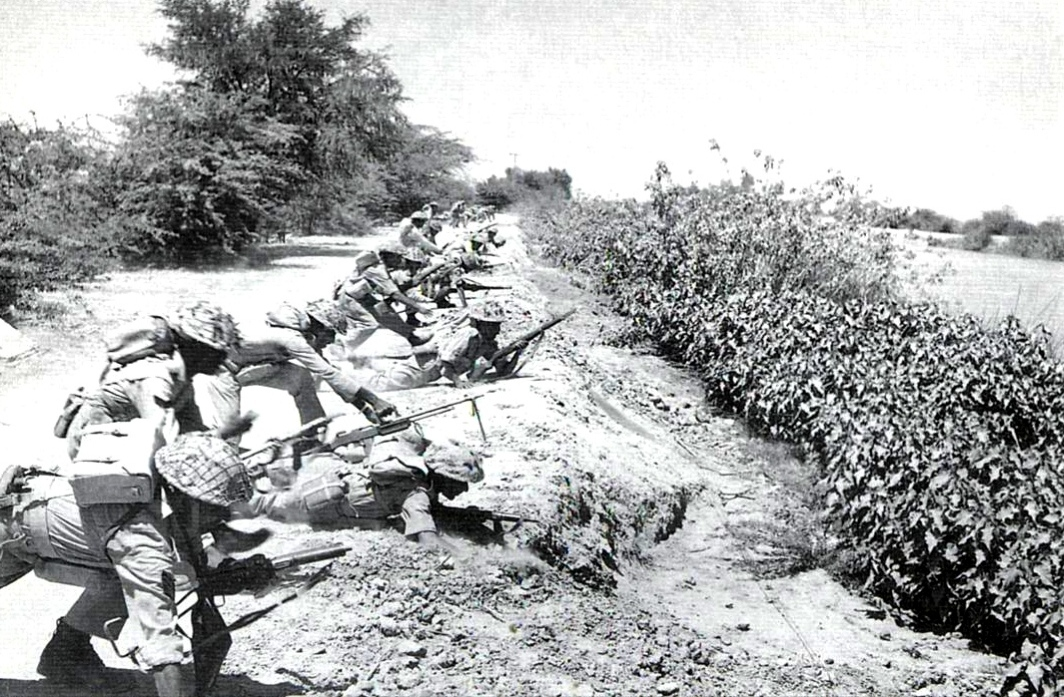
- Pakistani troops firing at Indian positions from a canal
Date	6–7 September 1965
Location	Kasur, Punjab, Pakistan
Result	Pakistani victory: Main Indian attack on Kasur repelled

Belligerents
Pakistan	India

Commanders and leaders
(Pakistan) Abdul Hamid Khan	(India) Niranjan Prasad

Units involved
(Pakistan) 11th Infantry Division: 21 Brigade; 52 Brigade; 106 Brigade; (Pakistan) 15th Lancers (Pakistan) 32 TDU Sqn	(India) 4th Mountain Division: 7 Mountain Brigade; 4 Grenadiers; 7 Grenadiers; 1/9 Gorkha Rifles; 62 Mountain Brigade; 18 Rajputana Rifles; 9 J&KJammu Kashmir Rifles; 13 Dogra Regiment; (India) Deccan Horse (India) 2 Ind. Armored Brigade

Strength
10,000 troops 60 tanks	17,000 troops 90 tanks

Casualties and losses
Unknown infantry casualties 12-17 tanks destroyed	1,100 casualties (both fatal and non-fatal); 30 tanks destroyed
- Civilian casualties: 1,200 killed, tens of thousands displaced

The Battle of Kasur was one of the largest battles of the Indo-Pakistani War of 1965, which took place on 6–7 September in the Pakistani city of Kasur, as part of India's aggression towards Lahore, the second largest city of Pakistan and provincial capital of Punjab.

The main fighting lasted for over a day, ending with the Indian retreat on 7 September, 1965 though minor raids and skirmishes continued till the ceasefire on 23 September, 1965 and later Tashkent Declaration was signed by both countries on 10 January 1966.

== Background ==
Kasur is a Pakistani city located 6 kilometers from the border with India, and 49 kilometers from Lahore. In 1965, Kasur was the only major city directly involved in a battle during the war.

The Indian plan was to attack and capture Kasur and advance to Lahore from there. This advance took place parallel to the Indian thrusts from the towns of Burki and Wagah.

== Strength ==
=== Pakistani defenses ===
Pakistan's 11th Infantry Division was in charge of defending the Kasur sector. It had two armored units: 15 Lancers (45 tanks) and 32nd TDU Squadron (15 tanks). Along the BRB Canal, two brigades were deployed - 52 Brigade and 106 Brigade. Meanwhile, the 21 Brigade was stationed at Luliani (northwest of Kasur, near the Lahore-Kasur road) and played the role of reserve forces for counter-attacks.

The Bambawali-Ravi-Bedian (BRB) Canal was Pakistan's main defensive line along this front. It was formidable in terms of the South Asian subcontinent where attack across water obstacles was regarded as a risky and difficult operation.

The western side of the canal had higher banks than the eastern side. This design gave Pakistani defenders a better view for firing and made it more difficult for Indian forces to cross the canal.

=== Indian attack ===
India's 4th Mountain Division, made up of 7 Mountain Brigade and 62 Mountain Brigade, was given the job of capturing Kasur. The division had support from Deccan Horse and the 2nd Independent Armored Brigade. The 7 Mountain Brigade attacked Kasur from the north, while the 62 Mountain Brigade attacked from the south. Deccan Horse provided support for both attacks, and the independent armored brigade was kept in reserve.

== Battle ==
On September 6, the Indian forces crossed the border and came within 2 miles of Kasur. Around 5:00 AM, Pakistan's 11th Division quickly moved to take up defensive positions along the BRB canal as the Indian attack grew stronger. The battle started with seven hours of heavy artillery fire and multiple airstrikes, followed by India's main attack on the city. Some of the war's most intense fighting happened here, lasting the entire day.

The 7 Mountain Brigade attacked from the north, targeting Ballanwala village and nearby bridges, but couldn't capture them. Meanwhile, the 62 Mountain Brigade had early success in the south, taking control of Sehjra salient and Rohi Nullah bund along the BRB Canal. However, Pakistani forces launched a strong counterattack that pushed the Indians back and regained these positions.

By late day September 6, India's 7 Grenadiers and 13 Dogra had taken such heavy losses that they were no longer combat-effective. These devastating casualties forced India's 4th Mountain Division to call off their main attack on Kasur and pull back to the border by 7 September. Pakistani reports described this retreat as a complete failure, noting that Indian forces abandoned significant amounts of weapons and ammunition which Pakistani troops captured.

Small Indian raids and airstrikes on Kasur continued till the ceasefire, though the city remained firmly in Pakistani hands.

== Aftermath and casualties ==
The Battle of Kasur was one of the toughest fights in the 1965 war between India and Pakistan. Pakistani reports say India suffered around 1,100 casualties, including dead, injured, and captured soldiers. Two Indian battalions—7 Grenadiers and 13 Dogra—were completely destroyed as fighting units. India also lost 30 tanks, while Pakistan lost between 12 and 17 tanks, and an unknown number of infantry.

On September 7–8, Pakistan's 1st Armored Division struck back hard and took control of Khem Karan, an important Indian market town just 5 km from the border. However, Pakistan's push forward was stopped when Indian forces fought back at the Battle of Asal Uttar.

== Civilian casualties ==
The war in Kasur started on September 6 when Indian troops came close to the town. For seven hours, heavy shelling destroyed buildings and killed people — a mosque fell on worshippers, and a school was badly damaged. On September 14, bombs destroyed part of the town and a factory outside it. Around 1200 people died as civilian casualties.

== See also ==
- Battle of Chawinda
- Battle of Asal Uttar
- Operation Gibraltar
