= Stand Down Order (1947) =

General order issued by Claude Auchinleck in 1947

The Stand Down Order was the title of a general order issued by Field Marshal Claude Auchinleck, the Supreme Commander of the Indian and Pakistani military forces, in 1947. It directed that, in the event of a war between the newly independent dominions of India and Pakistan, all the British officers on both sides should immediately stand down. The order was never invoked. However, it was raised when the Pakistani Governor-General, Mohammad Ali Jinnah, ordered Pakistani Army to march into Kashmir following the Indian air lift of troops for its defence. At Auchinleck's instance, Jinnah was forced to rescind his order. In subsequent months, the British government watered down the strength of the order, and General Douglas Gracey, the Commander-in-Chief of the Pakistani Army, defied it. Three brigades of the Pakistani Army were fighting in Kashmir in May 1948, as reported by Pakistan's foreign minister, Sir Zafrullah Khan, to the United Nations Commission for India and Pakistan.

== Bibliography ==
- Ankit, Rakesh (January 2010), "The Defiant Douglas", Epilogue, vol. 4, no. 1, pp. 46–47
- Ankit, Rakesh (2014), "To Issue 'Stand Down' or not...: Britain and Kashmir, 1947–49", Britain and the World, 7 (2): 238–260, doi:10.3366/brw.2014.0150
- Ankit, Rakesh (2016), The Kashmir Conflict: From Empire to the Cold War, 1945-66, Routledge, ISBN 978-1-317-22525-6

- Ankit, Rakesh (2014), Kashmir, 1945–66: From Empire to the Cold War (phd), University of Southampton

- Dasgupta, C. (2014) [first published 2002], War and Diplomacy in Kashmir, 1947-48, SAGE Publications, ISBN 978-81-321-1795-7
- Marston, Daniel (24 April 2014), The Indian Army and the End of the Raj, Cambridge University Press, ISBN 978-0-521-89975-8
- Moore, Robin James (1987), Making the new Commonwealth, Clarendon Press, ISBN 978-0-19-820112-0
