= Shabbir Sharif =

Pakistani soldier (1943–1971)

Major Shabbir Sharif NH SJ
- شبیر شریف
- Shabbir Sharif
- Born: 28 April 1943; Kunjah, Punjab Province, British India
- Died: 6 December 1971 (aged 28); Okara District, Punjab, Pakistan
- Relatives: General Raheel Shareef (brother); Raja Aziz Bhatti (distant relative)
- Military career
- Allegiance: Pakistan
- Branch: Pakistan Army
- Service years: 1961–1971
- Rank: Major
- Service number: PA-6911
- Unit: 6 Frontier Force Regiment
- Conflicts: Indo-Pakistan War of 1965; Operation Grand Slam; Indo-Pakistan War of 1971; Battle of Fazilka †
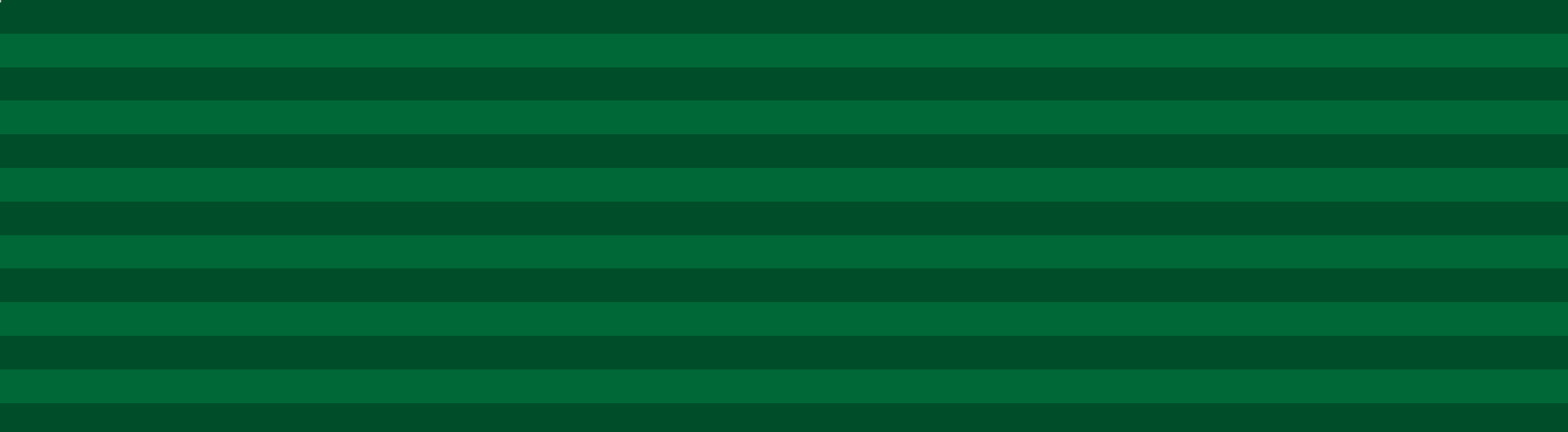
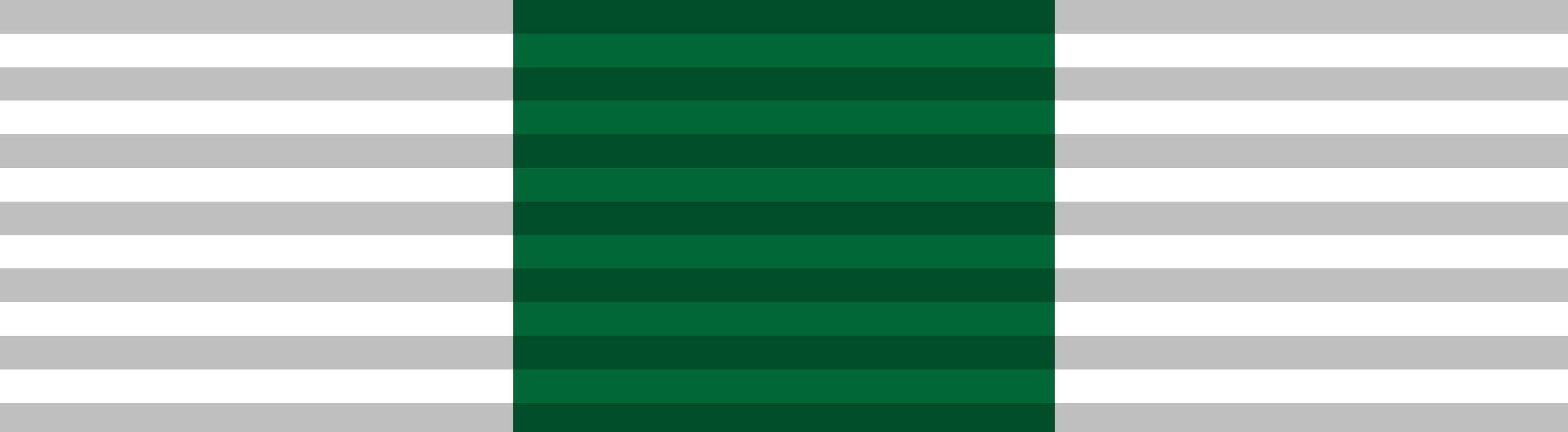
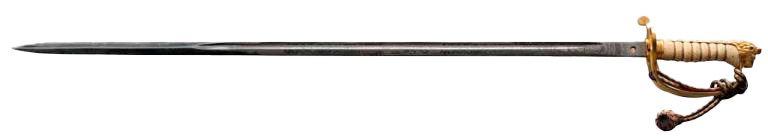
- Awards: Nishan-e-Haider Sitara-e-Jurat Sword of Honour

Major Muhammad Shabbir Sharif NH SJ (Urdu: محمد شبیر شریف ; c. 28 April 1943 – 6 December 1971), was a Pakistani military officer and the seventh recipient of Pakistan's highest military award, Nishan-e-Haider, which he was posthumously awarded for his actions of valor during the Indo-Pakistani War of 1971. He is the only recipient to have ever received both the Nishan-e-Haider and Sitara-e-Jurat for his bravery, and is regarded as the most decorated officer in the Pakistan Army. His younger brother, General Raheel Sharif, was the ninth Chief of Army Staff of the Pakistan Army.

== Early life and education ==
Sharif was born on 28 April 1943 in a Kashmiri Family at Kunjah, Gujrat District to Major Muhammad Sharif. He attended St. Anthony's High School, Lahore. While at Government College Lahore, he received a call to join Pakistan Military Academy (PMA) Kakul.

He used to play squash and won an Army level swimming medal while he was in 4th Frontier Force Regiment.

== Military career starting ==
He was commissioned in Pakistan Army on 19 April 1961. After successfully completing his training and being awarded the Sword of Honor, he was posted to the 6th Battalion of the Frontier Force Regiment. In 1965 war he was commanding 6FF under 10th Brigade, his unit saw action in Troti in first engagement Shabbir captured 4 Indian troops and destroyed 2 artillery guns with small patloon, in second action 6FF attack alongside with 13 Lancers on Troti right flank the attack succeed and Pakistani troops succeed to capture Troti plus a large number of Indian abandon vehicles, ammunition and POWs.

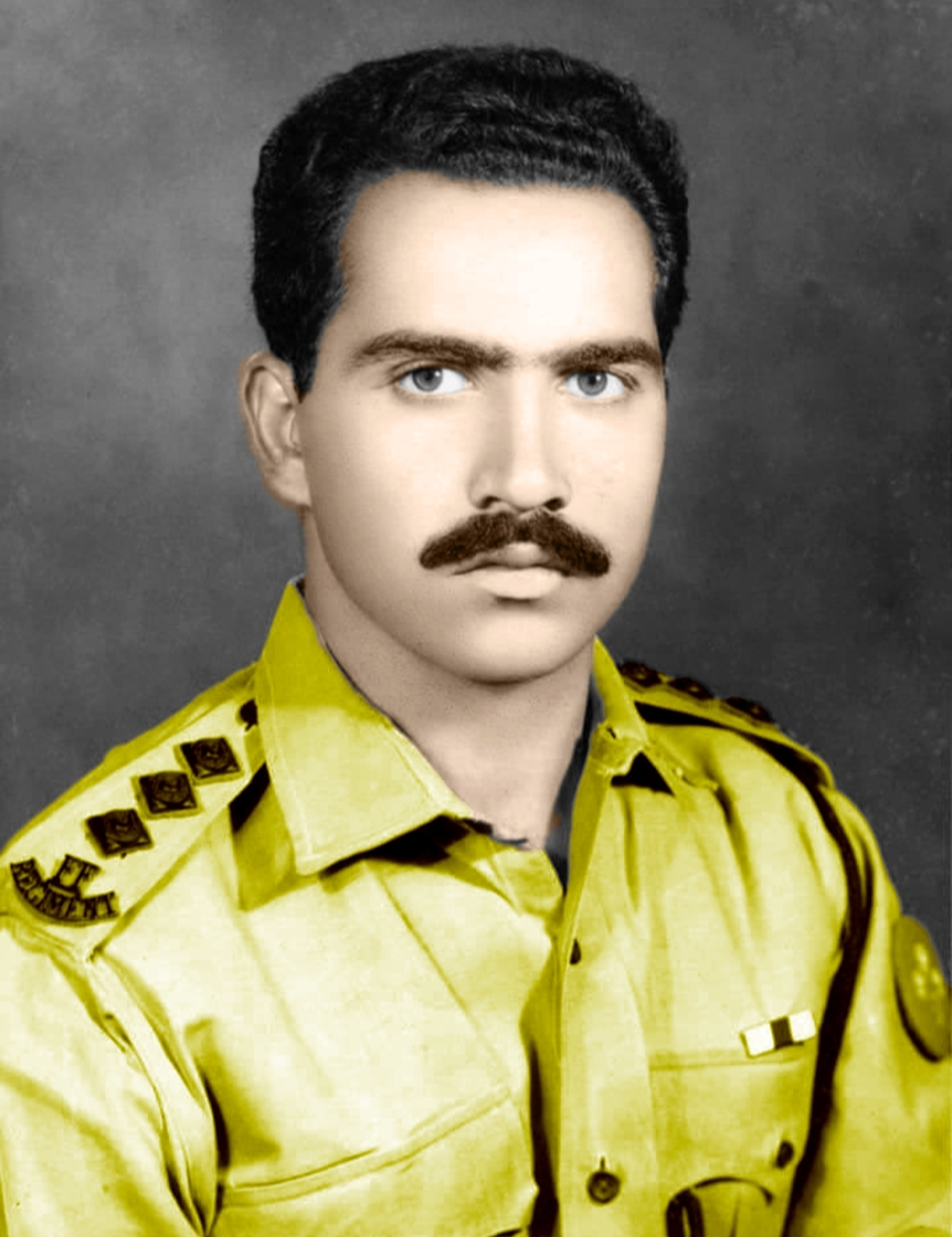
Shabbir Sharif in Captain insignia after 1965 War, wearing the Sitara-i-Jur'at on his chest.

== Nishan-e-Haider action ==
In the Indo-Pakistani War of 1971, the Pakistan Army launched an offensive on the Western front against the enemy. Sharif, as commander of a company of 6 Frontier Force Regiment, was ordered to capture high ground overlooking Grumukhi Khera and Beri, a village in the Sulemanki Sector.

On 3 December 1971, in a well-organized action, he fought alongside his men and held Indian attacks at bay. He cleared the Jhangar post by passing through the minefield laid by the enemy and swimming across a water obstacle, the 'Sabuna distributary', whilst under intense enemy fire and led his company to capture the objective.

On the afternoon of 6 December, the enemy launched an offensive preceded by air strikes and heavy artillery shelling. After casualties among the crew, he took over as a gunner on an anti-tank gun and started firing on the enemy tanks. While this fight was on, one of the enemy tanks fired at him thus killing him. His last words were quoted as: “Don’t lose the bridge.” It was the same bridge he died defending from the Indian Army's attack.

== Family ==
His younger brother, General Raheel Sharif was the Chief of Army Staff (November 2013 - November 2016), the highest rank in the Pakistan Army. He is also the relative of another Nishan-e-Haider holder, Raja Aziz Bhatti.

== In popular culture ==
An Indian Malayalam film, 1971: Beyond Borders, was inspired by the story of Major Shabbir Sharif.

== Awards and decorations ==
Nishan-e-Haider Award Recipient
- Date: 1971
- Country: Islamic Republic of Pakistan
- Presented by: Zulfiqar Ali Bhutto

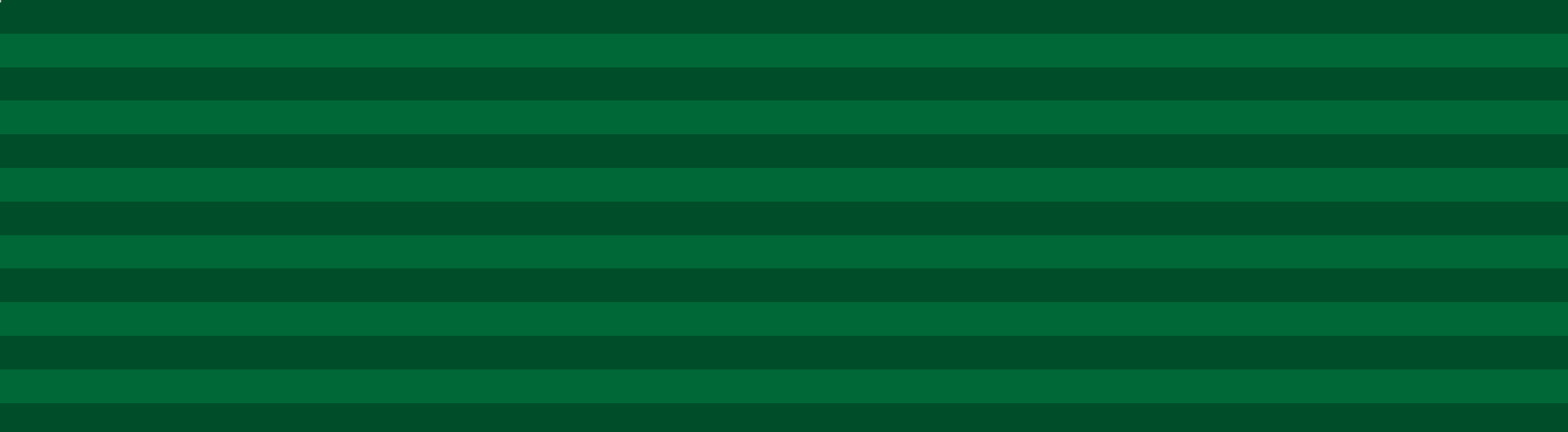
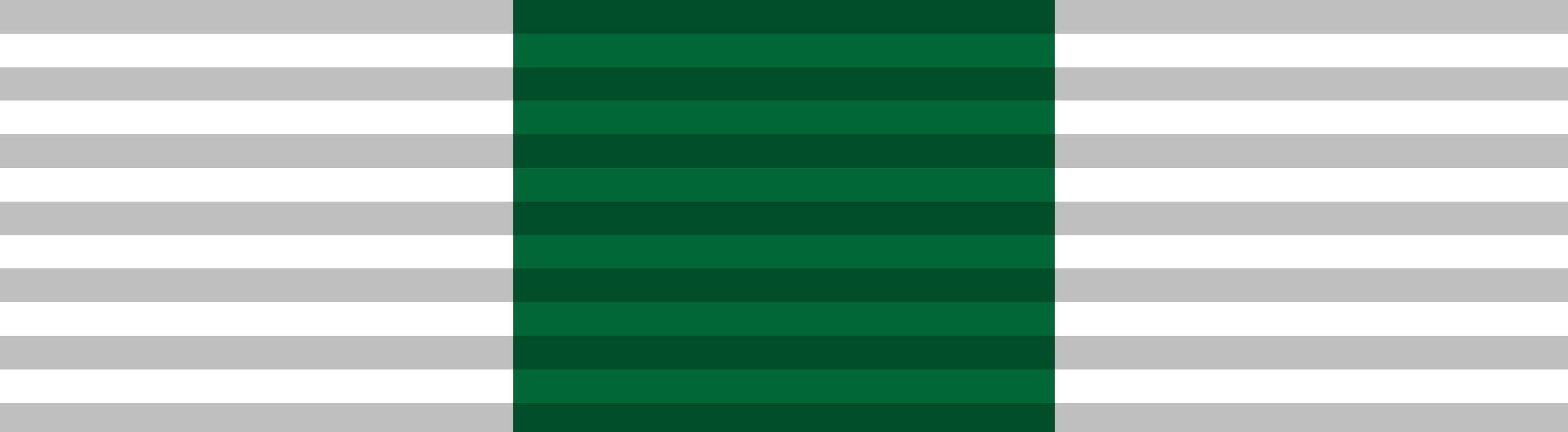

Nishan-e-Haider (Emblem of the Lion) 1971 War Posthumously		Sitara-e-Jurat (Star of Courage) 1965 War	Tamgha-e-Diffa (General Service Medal): 1. 1965 War Clasp; 2. 1971 War Clasp; Posthumously
Sitara-e-Harb 1965 War (War Star 1965)	Sitara-e-Harb 1971 War (War Star 1971) Posthumously	Tamgha-e-Jang 1965 War (War Medal 1965)	Tamgha-e-Jang 1971 War (War Medal 1971) Posthumously

Other awards he won are:

- Sword of Honor
