= Douglas Gracey =

British military officer (1894–1964)

Sir Douglas Gracey KCB KCIE CBE MC*
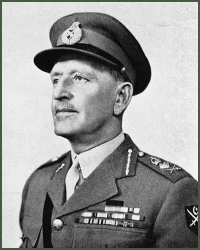
- Official Pakistan Army portrait, 1951
- Born: 3 September 1894; Muzaffarnagar, North-Western Provinces, British India
- Died: 5 June 1964 (aged 69); Surrey, England
- Military career
- Allegiance: United Kingdom; Pakistan
- Branch: British Army (1914–1915); British Indian Army (1915–1947); Pakistan Army (1947–1951)
- Service years: 1915—1951
- Rank: Lieutenant general (British India); General (Pakistan)
- Units: Royal Munster Fusiliers; 1st King George's Own Gurkha Rifles (The Malaun Regiment)
- Commands: Commander-in-Chief of the Pakistan Army (1948–1951); Chief of Staff of the Pakistan Army (1947–1948); British Indian I Corps; Northern Command, India; Allied Land Forces French Indochina; 20th Indian Infantry Division; 17th Indian Infantry Brigade
- Conflicts: First World War; Second World War; Anglo-Iraqi War; Syria-Lebanon campaign; Burma campaign; War in Vietnam (1945–1946); First Indo-Pakistani War
- Awards: Knight Commander of the Order of the Bath; Knight Commander of the Order of the Indian Empire; Commander of the Order of the British Empire; Military Cross & Bar; Mentioned in Despatches (3)

Sir Douglas David Gracey, KCB, KCIE, CBE, MC & Bar (3 September 1894 – 5 June 1964) was a British military officer who served as the second Commander-in-Chief of the Pakistan Army from 1948 to 1951. Prior to Pakistan's independence, he fought in the British Indian Army in both the First and Second World Wars.

== Early life ==
Born to English parents living in India, Gracey was educated in English schools before returning to India to serve in the military there. Gracey's initial education was at Blundell's School before moving on to the Royal Military College at Sandhurst, from where he was commissioned into the Unattached List, Indian Army on 15 August 1914 as a second lieutenant.

== Military career ==
By early 1915 he had been attached to the 5th Extra Reserve Battalion, Royal Munster Fusiliers. He served in France from 11 January to 2 May 1915 when he was wounded.

In September 1915, Gracey was appointed from the unattached list of the Indian Army into the 1st King George's Own Gurkha Rifles (The Malaun Regiment) with the rank of second lieutenant. With his Indian Army regiment he saw active service in Mesopotamia and Palestine and was awarded the Military Cross (MC) in 1917 and a Bar to the award in 1919.

The citation to his first MC read:

"For conspicuous gallantry and devotion to duty when commanding two companies in the attack. He succeeded in leading the two companies to the objective in spite of a determined opposition, and by his untiring energy and resource was largely responsible for the success of the operation."

As is often the case in wartime he held postings at various times with more senior acting rank, but was formally promoted lieutenant in August 1917 and captain with effect from August 1918.

=== Between the wars ===
Between the wars Gracey became an instructor at the Royal Military College, Sandhurst, in 1925, commanding one of the cadet companies. After this he attended the Staff College, Quetta, from 1928 to 1929, and his fellow students included Colin Gubbins, John Crocker, Eric Goddard, Lionel Cox, and Henry Davies, among many others, who were destined to achieve general officer rank. In peacetime, promotion came slowly and brevet ranks were used as an interim step to the next rank up for officers who performed well. In 1930, Gracey received a promotion to brevet major. In late 1931 he was appointed as GSO2 at GHQ India and by the time this appointment finished in late 1935 he had received his promotion to major. In early 1937 he was given another GSO2 posting at Western Command in India. Having waited so long to be raised from captain to major, his next advancements to brevet lieutenant-colonel and lieutenant-colonel came quite quickly, in January 1938 and February 1939.

==== Second World War ====
At the start of the Second World War in September 1939, Gracey was commanding officer of the 2nd Battalion, 3rd Queen Alexandra's Own Gurkha Rifles on the North West Frontier of India. In March 1940, upon his promotion to full colonel, he became assistant commandant of the Staff College, Quetta, with the Commandant then being Philip Christison, a British Army officer. In May 1941 he was promoted brigadier and given command of the 17th Indian Infantry Brigade which, as part of the 8th Indian Infantry Division, was sent shortly thereafter to Basra in Iraq but took no significant part in the Anglo-Iraqi War. In June 1941 the brigade was ordered to northwest Iraq to the Bec du Canard region in northeast Syria, part of the Syria-Lebanon campaign. After this Gracey and his brigade remained in Iraq as part of Iraqforce (subsequently Paiforce), protecting the Middle East from a possible Axis thrust south of the Caucasus. For his service, Gracey was appointed an Officer of the Order of the British Empire (OBE)

In April 1942 Gracey was promoted to acting major-general and given the task of forming and then commanding the 20th Indian Infantry Division. The division concentrated in Ceylon for training and in August 1943 was sent to the XV Indian Corps of the Fourteenth Army in northeast India to take part in the Burma campaign.

Soon the division was moved to IV Corps based at Imphal on the India–Burma border. From early April to late July 1944 the division was in almost constant combat during the Battle of Imphal, latterly as part of the XXXIII Indian Corps. There was then a four-month period of rest and recuperation before the division was back at the front with XXXIII Corps that attacked across the Chindwin river in December and thrust south. In February 1945 the division created a bridgehead across the Irrawaddy and broke out in mid-March to cut the Japanese communications and supplies to the battles being fought at Mandalay and Meiktila. The Fourteenth Army commander Lieutenant General "Bill" Slim was later to write about this action,

[The] break-out of the 20th Division was a spectacular achievement which only a magnificent division, magnificently led, could have staged after weeks of the heaviest defensive fighting.

Driving rapidly south the division captured Prome on 2 May, by which time the campaign was effectively over.

In February 1945 Gracey had been appointed a Commander of the order of the British Empire (CBE) for "gallant and distinguished services in Burma and on the Eastern Frontier of India" and in May his rank of major-general was made permanent. In July 1945, Gracey was made a Companion of the Order of the Bath (CB) and he was mentioned in dispatches. There were further mentions in dispatches for services in Burma in September 1945 and May 1946.

Because of Gracey's close relationship with his men, afforded by his long service as commander, the 20th Indian Infantry Division had a reputation as a happy and confident unit. Field Marshal Slim said of them, "I have never seen troops who carry their tails more vertically."

==== Indochina ====
In September 1945, Gracey led 20,000 troops of the 20th Indian Infantry Division ijnto Saigon. During the Potsdam Conference in July 1945, the Allies had agreed on Britain taking control of Vietnam south of the 16th parallel (then part of French Indochina) from the Japanese occupiers. Ho Chi Minh, the leader of the communist Viet Minh, proclaimed Vietnamese independence from French rule and big pro-independence and anti-French demonstrations and strikes were held in Saigon. The French, anxious to retain their colony, persuaded Lord Mountbatten, to authorise Gracey to declare martial law. Fearing a communist takeover of Vietnam, Gracey decided to arm French citizens who had remained in Saigon and allowed them to seize control of public buildings from the Viet Minh.

In October 1945, Gracey rearmed the Japanese garrison and used them to occupy the city. Some American commentaries call this controversial decision one that furthered Ho Chi Minh's cause of liberating Vietnam from foreign rule, starting the First Indochina War. Peter Dunn and Timothy Smith claim that his orders were intended to maintain essential services and prevent the slaughter of the civilian population. Marston reviews the military position Gracey was in. French General Philippe Leclerc arrived in Saigon in October 1945 to assume command but it was not until well into the first half of 1946 that enough French troops had arrived to allow Gracey in March 1946 to return with the bulk of his troops to India where the 20th Indian Infantry Division was disbanded.

==== After Second World War ====
Promoted acting lieutenant-general in May 1946, Gracey successively commanded Northern Command and Indian I Corps in India. He was appointed a Knight Commander of the Order of the Indian Empire (KCIE) in January 1948 and served in the honorary capacity of Colonel Commandant of the Indian Signal Corps between March 1946 and October 1948.

=== Pakistan ===
When British India was partitioned in 1947 Gracey became Chief of Staff in the newly created GHQ, Pakistan before succeeding Frank Messervy as the Commander-in-Chief of the Pakistan Army in 1948.

When the Pakistani tribal invasion of Kashmir began on 22 October 1947, Messervy was away in London, and Gracey was acting as the Army Chief. He declined to send Pakistani troops to the Kashmir front as ordered by Mohammad Ali Jinnah (the Governor General) but referred the issue to Claude Auchinleck, the Supreme Commander of Indian and Pakistani forces. Both the armies were under joint British command at this stage, and Auchinleck had already issued Standdown instructions to the effect that all British officers would stand down in the event of a military conflict between the two countries. After hearing Auchinleck's reasoning, Jinnah rescinded his order.

Gracey left the Pakistan Army in April 1951 to retire, having attained the rank of full general. However, his permanent rank in the British Army had never advanced beyond major general so on retirement he was granted the honorary rank of general, having also been advanced to Knight Commander of the Order of the Bath (KCB) in January 1951 at the request of the Pakistan government.

== Final years ==
After his retirement Gracey settled in Surrey. He was a keen cricketer and a member of the Marylebone Cricket Club (MCC) and served as Chairman of the Royal Hospital and Home for Incurables at Putney in the years before his death, which occurred on 5 June 1964, at the age of 69.

== Timeline ==
- Commissioned into 1st King George's Own Gurkha Rifles (The Malaun Regiment) (1915)
- Brigadier General Staff Western Command, India – 1938
- Commanding Officer 2nd Battalion 3rd Queen Alexandra's Own Gurkha Rifles – 1939 to 1940
- Assistant Commandant of Staff College Quetta, India – 1940 to 1941
- Commanding Officer 17th Indian Brigade, Iraq and Syria – 1941 to 1942
- General Officer Commanding 20th Indian Division, Burma – 1942 to 1946
- Commander in Chief Allied Land Forces French Indochina – 1945 to 1946
- General Officer Commander in Chief Northern Command, India −1946
- General Officer Commanding Indian I Corps – 1946 to 1947
- Chief of Staff, Pakistan Army – 1947 to 1948
- Commander in Chief Pakistan Army – 1948 to 1951
- Retired with honorary rank of general – 1951

== Awards and decorations ==
Knight Commander of the Order of the Bath	Knight Commander of the Order of the Indian Empire	Commander of the Order of the British Empire
KCB	KCIE	CBE

Military Cross	Mentioned in Despatches
MC with Bar	3 times

== See also ==
- Iraqforce
- Rawalpindi Conspiracy 1951
- First Indochina War

== Bibliography ==
- Mead, Richard (2007). Churchill's Lions: A Biographical Guide to the Key British Generals of World War II. Stroud: Spellmount. ISBN 978-1-86227-431-0.
- Smart, Nick (2005). Biographical Dictionary of British Generals of the Second World War. Barnesley: Pen & Sword. ISBN 1844150496.
- Slim, Field Marshal Viscount (1972) [1956]. Defeat into Victory. London: Cassell. ISBN 0-304-29114-5.
- Dunn, Peter (1985). The First Vietnam War. London: Hurst.
- Smith, Timothy (2014). 'Vietnam and the Unravelling of Empire General Gracey in Asia 1942–1951. London: Palgrave.

Military offices
Preceded by Sir Frank Messervy	C-in-C, Pakistan Army; 1948–1951	Succeeded by Ayub Khan
