= A. H. Amin =

Pakistani military historian (1961–2025)

Agha Humayun Amin
- آغا همایون امین
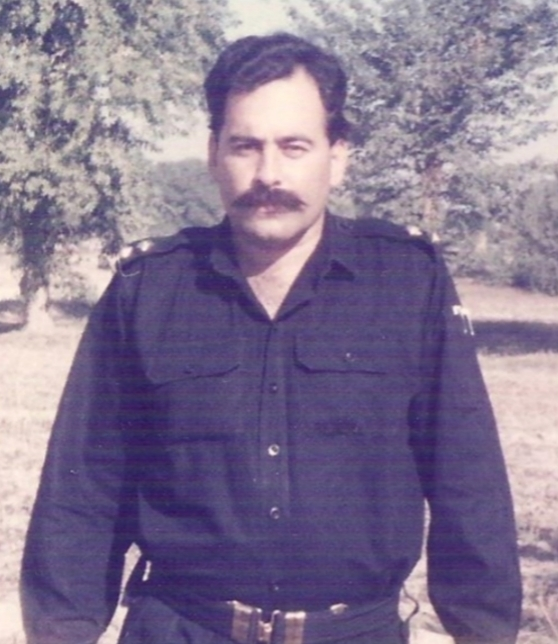
- Amin as a Lieutenant in 1989
- Born: 1961; Quetta, West Pakistan (Present-day Balochistan, Pakistan)
- Died: February 21, 2025 (aged 64); Lahore, Punjab, Pakistan
- Education: Forman Christian College; Pakistan Military Academy
- Military career
- Allegiance: Pakistan
- Branch: Pakistan Army
- Service years: 1981–1995
- Rank: Major
- Units: 11 Cavalry; 58 Cavalry; 15 Lancers
- Other work: Military historian; Defense analyst; Author

Agha Humayun Amin (Pashto: آغا همایون امین, Urdu: آغا ہمایوں امین,) (1961 – February 21, 2025) was a former Pakistan Army officer who later became a prominent military historian, and defense analyst. Known for his writings on South Asian military history, military strategy and geopolitics. Amin made significant contributions to the study of Pakistan’s military campaigns and regional conflicts.

== Early life and education ==
Amin was born into a military family in 1961 in Quetta, one of the major cities of Pakistan, located in the province of the current day Balochistan. His family was ethnically Pashtun but of Afghan origin. His family had served for centuries in the Government and Military. His father was a decorated Brigadier of the Pakistan Army. Amin had completed his 12th from Forman Christian College.

== Origins and family ==
Amin came from an ethnic Pashtun military family and his ancestors served in Afghanistan, and more specifically and prominently, the British Raj, dating back to the late nineteenth century. While they had settled in Northern India, they, through their military service and general connections, maintained deep relations with Afghanistan, and Afghans in general, due to their Pashtun roots.

His great-grandfather, Faiz Baksh, was a Pashtun man who came originally from Jalalabad, Afghanistan, as a scholar and teacher with a caravan, and travelled (or had some form of relations) throughout Turkey, Iran, and the broader Afghanistan. He was part of the centuries-long waves of settlement of Pashtuns migrating to India (specifically Northern India) during the medieval, Mughal, and British eras. He was specifically part of the Sikandra Rao and Aligarh migration groups, being part and/or having relations with the Sherwani and Lodi Pashtuns (tribes). Faiz eventually first settled somewhere near Aligarh, Sikandra Rao, and Delhi.

The confusion often arises because source materials reference their family being both Pashtun and Faiz Baksh being specifically from Aligarh. In the context of South Asian genealogy, the Aligarh designation indicates the geographic location of the ancestral family estate, historical employment, and location of eventual migration, not ethnic descent. This designation therefore reflects the family's long-standing regional settlement and estate rather than a non-Pashtun ethnicity, or in other words, not originating from Aligarh.

Faiz (who was also originally Afghan) married an Afghan woman (likely practicing endogamy) named Abadi Begum and for the majority of his life, lived in their own estate, Faiz Manzal in Delhi, named after him. The road in which the estate was located, Faiz Road, was also named after him to honor him. Faiz served in the police service, a common practice for Pashtuns wishing to maintain a martial life. He retired in around 1915 and died in 1920.

Additionally, extensive sources online transcript this family in detail, with specific events, migration, family sequences, and more. This is very likely due to not just isolated members, but widespread notability of the family in general. One such example is one of Faiz Baksh's son, Abdus Samad. Abdus Samad, son of Faiz Baksh and Abadi Begum, was a medical physician who completed his medical degree in Lucknow. Abdus Samad eventually became the personal physician of King Mohammed Zahir Shah of Afghanistan. He spent his time with the King in Kabul, and he was also with him in Gardez, where Zahir Shah spent his winter.

== Military career ==
Amin joined the army through 67th PMA Long Course and was commissioned in to the elite 11th Prince Albert Victor’s Own (PAVO) Cavalry and later the Armored Corps.

During his career, he served in various roles, focusing on operational strategy and armored warfare. He served at numerous units of Cavalry, including 11 Cavalry, 58 Cavalry and 15 Lancers and. He was later appointed Officer Commanding of 5th Armoured Squadron. He attained the rank of Major before retiring from the military in March 1994.

== Military history and writing ==
"The enemy is not in Waziristan or Afghanistan. The enemy is our own damn inefficiency and complacency."

— Agha Humayun Amin, Defence Journal, October 2009

After retiring, Amin turned to military history and analysis. He authored numerous books and articles on South Asian Wars and Key Military Individuals. Amin was one of the few officers, who had criticized the military failure of Pakistan in 1947, 1965, 1999 wars. He also covered various topics apart from Pakistan's military doctrine and wars, such as Soviet-Afghan War. Amin had talked about current affairs and ongoing crises in Pakistan.

=== Notable works ===
Agha Amin wrote extensively on military history, writing 30 books and over 200 articles. Some of his key works include:

- Pakistan Army Till 1965
- The Sepoy Rebellion of 1857-59
- Afghanistan: From Cold War to the War on Terror
- India-Pakistan Wars: A Strategic Analysis
- A Concise History of the Pakistan Army
- The Battle for Afghanistan: A Critical Analysis
- The 1965 War: A Reassessment
- The 1971 War: A Military Perspective

His work was known for its analytical depth, reliance on primary sources, and alternative perspectives on historical events.

== Contributions to defense analysis ==
Amin contributed articles to various military and strategic think tanks. His insights were featured in prominent publications such as Defence Journal, GlobalSecurity.org, Small Wars Journal and The Friday Times. His writings on Pakistan's military doctrines, regional conflicts, and historical battles are highly regarded among defense scholars and policymakers.

== Death and legacy ==
Amin died on February 21, 2025, in Lahore, Pakistan, after a brief illness from complications of cancer. Amin contributed much in military history and strategic analysis, doing in-depth research to uphold the truth, leveraging his extensive career, history, experience and connections to his advantage. Amin’s work remains influential among military historians, defense analysts, and strategic studies experts. His ability to combine firsthand military experience with historical research made his writings a valuable resource for understanding Pakistan’s defense history and South Asian military affairs.
