= Battle of Fazilka =

Battle in the Indo-Pakistani War of 1971

- Part of the Indo-Pakistani War of 1971
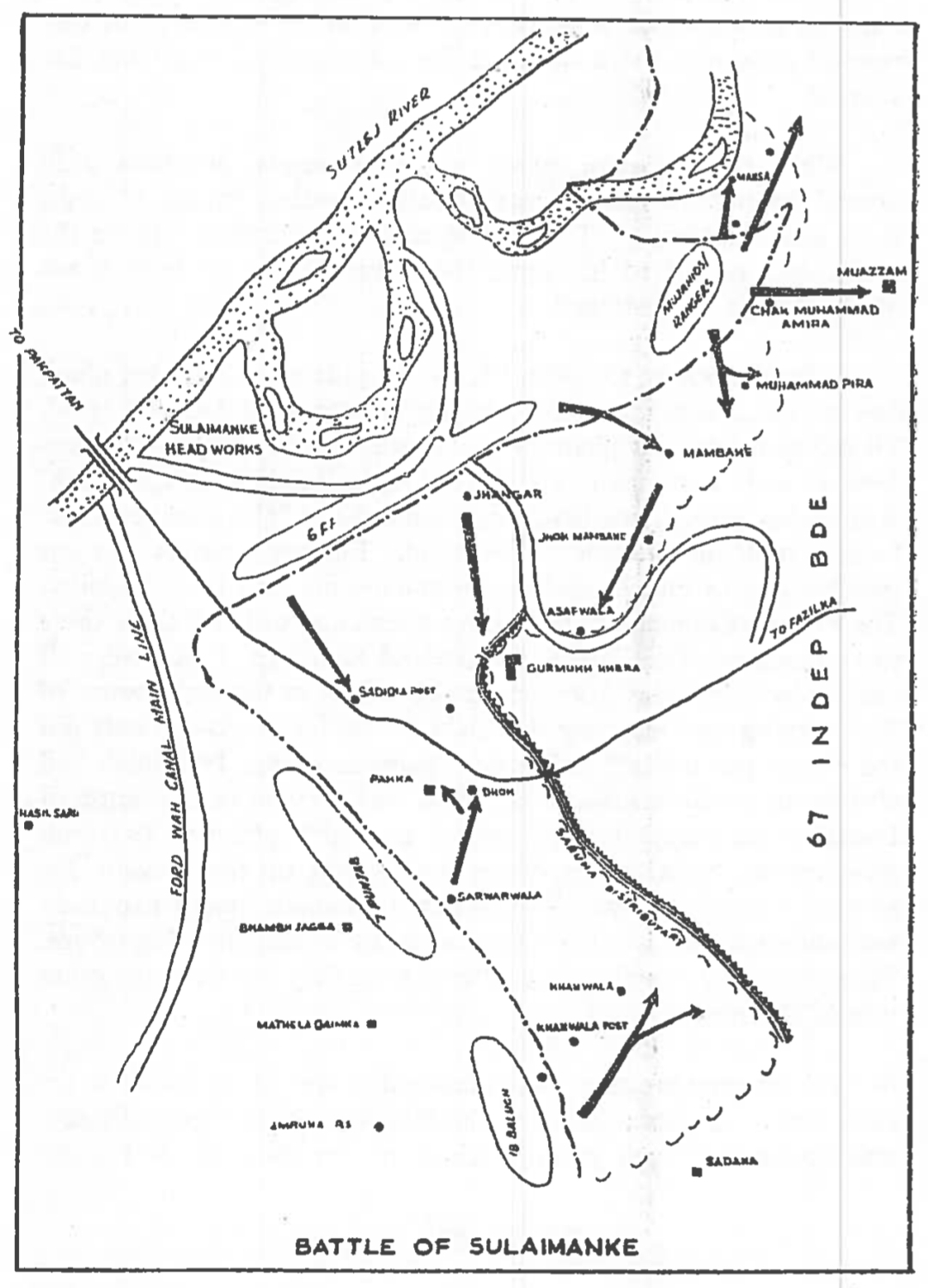
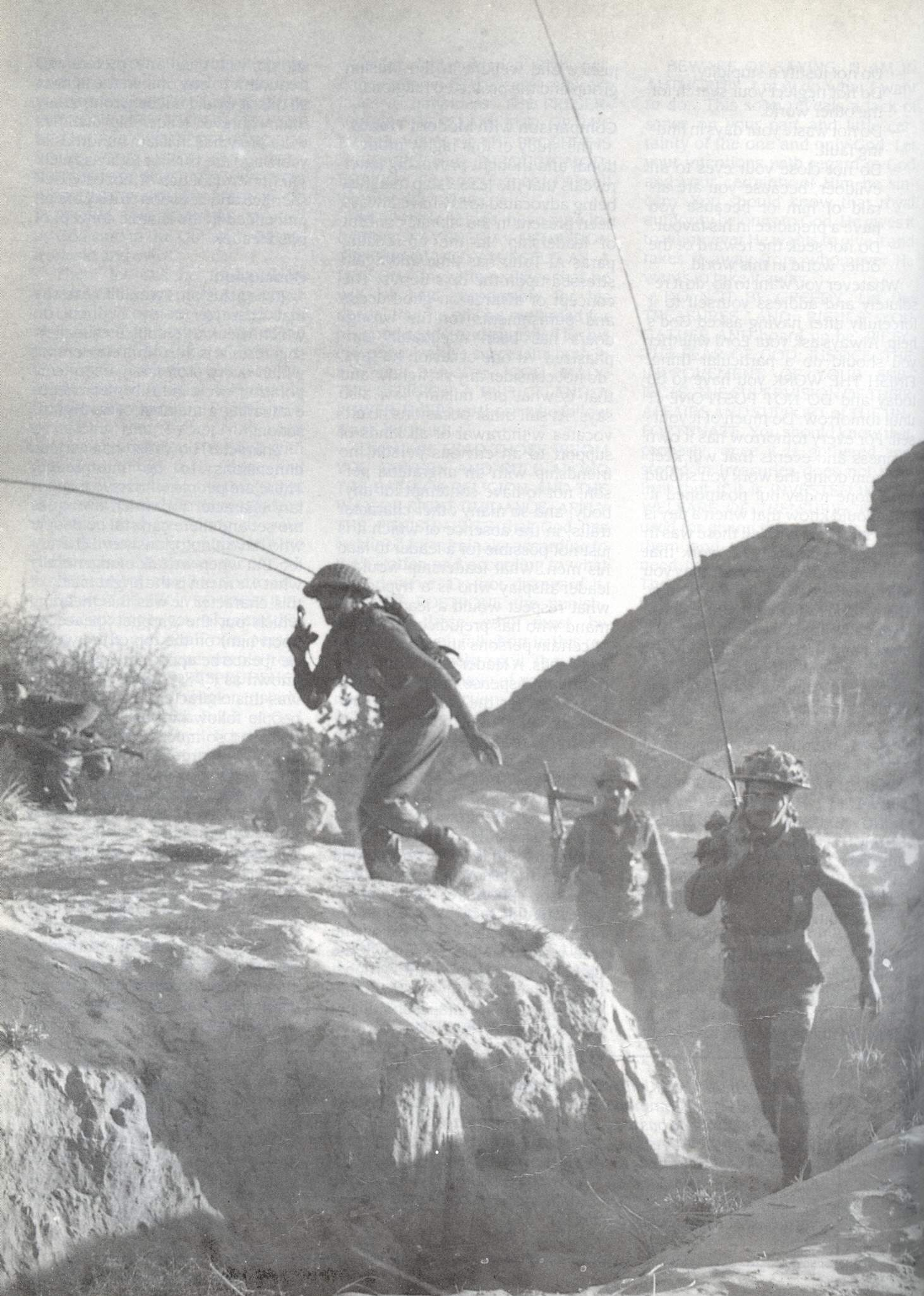
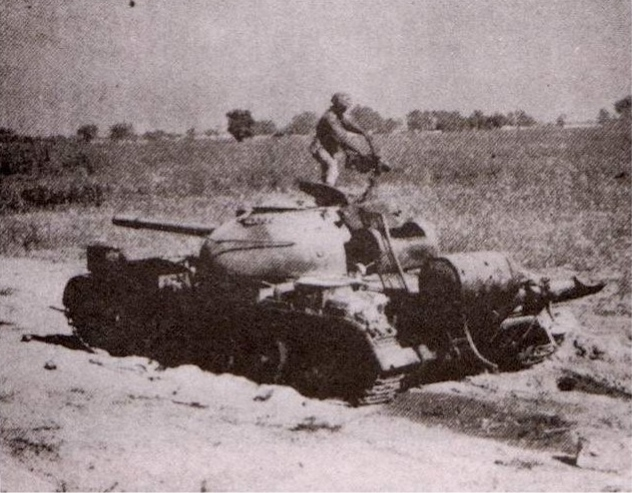
- From left to right and bottom: Battleground map of Sulemanki.; The Pakistani army overwhelmed the Indian defenses at Fazilka.; A Pakistani soldier from the 6th Frontier Force Regiment on a knocked-out Indian T-54/55 at Sulemanki.
Date	3 December – 17 December 1971
Location	Fazilka, Punjab India-Pakistan Border
Result	Pakistani victory
Territorial changes	Pakistan captured significant land in Fazilka

Belligerents
India	Pakistan

Commanders and leaders
(India) Brig. S.S. Chowdhry (replaced by Brig. G.S. Reen, later by Brig. Piara Singh)	(Pakistan) Brig. Amir Hamza (Pakistan) Major Shabbir Sharif †

Units involved
Indian Army: 67th Brigade; 3 Assam; 4 Jat; 15 Rajput; 3/11 Gorkha; 22 Cavalry; 8 Cavalry; Border Security Force	Pakistan Army: 105th Brigade; 6 Frontier Force Regiment; 7 Punjab Regiment; 18 Baloch Regiment; Pakistan Air Force: No. 17 Squadron PAF

Strength
16x T-54 tanks; 16x Sherman tanks; 24x field artillery guns; 8x medium artillery guns; (plus reinforcements)	16x Sherman tanks; Unknown artillery guns; 12x F-86 aircraft

Casualties and losses
190 killed; 145 captured; 196 missing; 425 wounded; Total Casualties: 956 Several tanks destroyed	59 killed; 30 Captured; Total Casualties: 89 1 tank captured

The Battle of Fazilka, also known as the Battle of Sulemanki, was a military engagement during the Indo-Pakistani War of 1971 in the western front, near the Indo-Pakistani border in Punjab. In this battle Pakistani forces achieved success against the Indian 67 Brigade, capturing significant territory west of Fazilka.

== Background ==
Fazilka, a prominent border city in Fazilka district, Punjab, lies at the end of a testing on the Sulemanki headworks in Pakistan. Defence of the headworks has always been one of the most important commitments of Pakistan's military planners. Their proximity-1.5 kilometres or so from Indian territory-made the area very vulnerable and largely influenced Pakistani concepts of its defence. Pakistan had no choice but to gain some cushion of depth by extending operations into Indian territory at the very outset. This was achieved in 1965 and was repeated in 1971.

== Battle ==
On the twilight of 3 December, the Pakistani brigade, under cover of intense artillery fire, charged through the Indian troops with such speed and ferocity that it was able to establish a foothold on the tank obstacle line of the Sabuna Distributary six miles inside, within an hour. The 6 FF ambushed the withdrawing enemy and killed 50 and captured 145.

The Indian army seemed to be very sensitive about this area and made determined efforts to recapture the lost ground every night with fresh troops throughout the war. Most of these attacks were launched on 'B' Company's (6 FF) positions. Sikhs, Rajputs, Gurkhas, Assamis and Jats were used at different times. The most determined attack was that of 4 Jats, when, on the night of December 5, some of its elements led by Major Narayan Singh penetrated 'B' Company's (6 FF) positions on the embank-ment. In the ensuing hand to hand fight this Indian Major was killed by another Pakistani company commander Major Shabbir Sharif. That night in another counterattack, the Indian tanks closed up to two yards of 6 FF positions after having destroyed all the antitank guns in the area. They were only repulsed by artillery fire and 3.5 Energa grenades. During all these fiercely fought battles, Five 8 Cavalry tanks were bogged down here, and four of them were destroyed by Pakistani artillery and infantry antitank weapons.

Since all Indian counterattacks were foiled within hours of darkness, air support during daytime largely served to mop up any stragglers, besides boosting friendly troops' morale. No 17 Squadron, based at Rafiqui, flew 55 F-86E sorties, of which 33 were considered successful. In 22 sorties, either no targets could be found or, bombs were released on dead reckoning with questionable results. Half a dozen tanks and some vehicles were claimed as destroyed.

According to Indian Army Major General and military historian Sukhwant Singh the Indian army failed at the battle of Fazilka:

So obsessed were the Indian commanders with the elimination of the Pakistan lodgment that between Chowdhary and Ram Singh five counterattacks were launched for this purpose. All failed miserably as troops were committed piecemeal in the expected direction and over ground having a funnelling effect on the assaulting troops These unimaginative attacks resulted in inordinately heavy casualties and eroded Indian morale. On the other hand, our failures made heroes of the men of B Company 6 FF holding the lodgement, Indeed, they deserved praise showered on them.

== Aftermath ==
Although major hostilities ended with the ceasefire, on 26–27 December, Indian 4 Para of 51 Para Brigade conducted an assault to dislodge a small Pakistani platoon from a sand dune near Nagi village. The attack resulted in 21 Indian killed and 60 wounded.

== Awards ==
Pakistani Major Shabbir Sharif from 6 FF awarded with Nishan-e-Haider.

Brigadier Amir Hamza awarded by S.J.

== See also ==
- Indo-Pakistani War of 1965
