= 11th Infantry Division (Pakistan) =

- Active: July 1965 - Present
- Country: Pakistan
- Allegiance: PAK
- Branch: Pakistan Army
- Type: Infantry
- Role: Division
- Size: 20,000 men (though this may vary as units are rotated)
- Part of: IV Corps
- Division Headquarters: Lahore, Punjab province
- Colours: Red over Black
- Anniversaries: Defence Day
- Engagements: Indo-Pakistani War of 1965; Battle of Lahore Battle of Khem Karan Battle of Husseinwala
- Decorations: Awards and decorations of the Pakistan military

Commanders
- General Officer Commanding: Major General Rao Imran Sartaj

- Colonel Staff: Colonel Babar
- Notable commanders: General Raheel Sharif; General Abdul Hamid Khan; LTG Nadeem Taj; Maj-Gen Bilal Omer Khan; Maj-Gen Raza Muhammad; Maj-Gen Azeem Asif; LTG Shafaat Ullah Shah; Maj-Gen Muhammad Ali Khan

Insignia
- Flag

The 11th Infantry Division, or the Battle-Axe Division is an active formation of the Pakistan Army. It is currently deployed under IV Corps and is responsible for the defence of Lahore and its surrounding areas.

The division was formed just before the Indo-Pakistani War of 1965. Prior to this, the army chief at the time, General Muhammad Musa, had been calling for raising two new divisions; this was denied by the government citing a benign security environment, the lack of funds and the general reluctance of the US to fund new risings under the foreign military assistance scheme.

After the 1962 Sino-Indian War, the Indian army underwent a substantial increase in numbers and capability and, therefore, the Pakistani government reversed its position and the division was raised by utilising reserve GOC, Major General Abdul Hamid Khan. The Division was then assigned to the defence of Lahore.

== 1965 Indo-Pak War ==
The Division as a whole first went into action at the Battle of Lahore, though individual units had seen action already in the Rann of Kutch and in Operation Grand Slam. It, along with the 10th Division, successfully withstood the Indian assault towards Lahore, with the 11th fighting in the Kasur region. After this battle, the division was committed to the Khem Karan offensive, for which the Divisional HQ was given command of the 1st Armoured Division. The two formations successfully managed to capture Khem Karan, though further attacks by the 1st Armoured were checked by the Indians. At the same time as the fighting in Khem Karan, the Indian offensive towards Sialkot was making progress at the Battle of Chawinda and the 1st Armoured was withdrawn to reinforce the Pakistani forces in that sector. The 11th was forced to fall back to Khem Karan, where it withstood multiple attempts by the Indians to retake the town, however the ceasefire found the division in command of the town and several hundred square kilometres of Indian territory.

== 1971 War ==
Six years later, the division once again went into action in the 1971 war, and in a repeat of the experience in 1965, the Division crossed the Radcliffe Line, the international border, once more. 106 Brigade succeeded in overwhelming the resistance of the Indian 15th Battalion, Punjab Regiment (35 Infantry Brigade, 14th Infantry Division of India) to take significant ground near Hussainiwala, thereby controlling a key dam and threatening the border town of Ferozepur. One of the famous features that the formation captured was the Qaisar-e-Hind Fort.

== 1989 Battle of Jalalabad ==
According to former Afghan General Syed Quddus, who took part in the Battle of Jalalabad and wrote about his experiences in his 2019 publication 'Hamāsa-ye Nabard-e Jalālābād', the 11th Infantry Division and two border brigades of the Pakistan Border Forces, supported the Mujahideen assault on Jalalabad with rocket and artillery fire from a distance.

== Order Of Battle ==
The division is at present deployed around Lahore and has the following composition:

- 21st Infantry Brigade, Lahore
- 52nd Infantry Brigade, Lahore
- 106th Infantry Brigade, Lahore
- Artillery Brigade, Lahore
- 15th Heavy Mechanized Brigade, Lahore
