= Commander-in-Chief of the Pakistan Army =

Head of the Pakistan Army from 1947 to 1972

- پاک فوج کے کمانڈر انچیف
- Flag of the Pakistan Army
- Ministry of Defence; Army Secretariat-I at MoD
- Abbreviation: C-in-C
- Residence: Rawalpindi Cantonment
- Seat: General Headquarters; Rawalpindi Cantonment in Punjab, Pakistan
- Nominator: Governor General of Pakistan, Prime Minister or President of Pakistan
- Appointer: Governor General of Pakistan, Prime Minister or President of Pakistan
- Term length: Not fixed
- Formation: 15 August 1947; 79 years ago
- First holder: Frank Messervy
- Final holder: Gul Hassan Khan
- Abolished: 3 March 1972; 54 years ago
- Succession: Chief of Army Staff
- Unofficial names: Army chief
- Deputy: Chief of Staff of the Pakistan Army

The Commander-in-Chief of the Pakistan Army (abbreviation: C-in-C of the Pakistan Army) was the professional head of the Pakistan Army from 1947 to 1972. As an administrative position, the appointment holder had main operational command authority over the army.

Direct appointments to the command of the Pakistan Army came from the British Army Council until 1951, when the first native Pakistani commander-in-chief (General Ayub Khan) was nominated and appointed by the Government of Pakistan.

The C-in-C designation was changed to 'Chief of Army Staff' in 1972. Six generals served as C-in-C, the first two were British natives and the post's name was derived from the post of Commander-in-Chief of the British Indian Army.

== History ==
Prior to the Partition of British India on 14 August 1947, the senior generals of the British Indian Army were appointed by the Army Council (1904) of the British Army.

The supreme military commander's appointment was known as Commander-in-Chief, India who directly reported to the Governor-General of India who was also under the British monarchy. Field Marshal Sir Claude Auchinleck was the last Commander-in-Chief of the undivided British Indian Army who became the supreme commander of India and Pakistan on 15 August 1947 serving till November 30 of that year.

Dominion of Pakistan was born on 14 August 1947 and its army was known as 'Royal Pakistan Army'; on 15 August British Indian Army's General Frank Messervy became the first C-in-C of the newly created Pakistan Army. General Ayub Khan was the first native Pakistani to hold the appointment on 17 January 1951. However, Ayub didn't hold the substantive rank of full general till 1957.

In 1969, when General Yahya Khan became President of Pakistan, Lieutenant General Abdul Hamid Khan was promoted to full General and was appointed as the 'Chief of Staff of the Army'. On 20 March 1972, the commander-in-chief post was renamed as "Chief of Army Staff (COAS)" with Lieutenant-General Tikka Khan elevated to four star rank to be appointed as army's first chief of army staff; this renaming was done copying India's COAS appointment.

== Appointees ==
The following table chronicles the appointees to the office of the Commander-in-Chief since the independence of Pakistan to 1972.

=== Commanders-in-Chief, Pakistan Army (1947–1972) ===
No.	Portrait	Commander-in-Chief	Took office	Left office	Time in office	Unit of Commission	Notes
1	Sir Frank MesservyKCSI KBE CB DSO & Bar	General; Sir Frank Messervy; KCSI KBE CB DSO & Bar (1893–1974)	15 August 1947	10 February 1948	179 days	9th Hodson's Horse	The first commander-in-chief of the army who was in the acting rank of full general.
2	Sir Douglas David GraceyKCB KCIE CBE MC & Bar	General; Sir Douglas David Gracey; KCB KCIE CBE MC & Bar (1894–1964)	11 February 1948	16 January 1951	2 years, 339 days	1st King George's Own Gurkha Rifles (The Malaun Regiment)	The last native British officer to hold the title, served as an acting full general like his predecessor.
3	Ayub KhanNPk HJ HPk MBE LoM	General; Ayub Khan; NPk HJ HPk MBE LoM (1907–1974)	17 January 1951	27 October 1958	7 years, 284 days	5 Punjab Regiment	The first native Pakistani officer to serve as Commander-in-Chief. He was also the first to hold the position with the substantive rank of general in 1957.
4	Musa KhanHPk HJ HI HQA MBE IDSM	General; Musa Khan; HPk HJ HI HQA MBE IDSM (1908–1991)	28 October 1958	17 September 1966	7 years, 324 days	6/13 Frontier Force Rifles (1FF)	C-in-C during the Indo-Pak war of 1965 and also the longest serving officer to hold the post.
5	Yahya KhanHPk HJ SPk NePi	General; Yahya Khan; HPk HJ SPk NePi (1917–1980)	18 September 1966	19 December 1971	5 years, 92 days	10 Baluch Regiment	First Commander-in-Chief to serve as President of the country from 1969 to 1971.
6	Gul Hassan KhanSQA SPk	Lieutenant General; Gul Hassan Khan; SQA SPk (1921–1999)	20 December 1971	3 March 1972	74 days	5th Horse	Last Commander-in-Chief, serving till 1972 in the rank of Lieutenant General.

== Responsibility ==
The responsibility of the C-in-C was to perform as the chief commander of the army, he was responsible to make army and war policies along with other senior generals. He had the main command authority over the army. It was also the responsibility of the general to preside over the formation commanders meeting and any other meeting in the General Headquarters.

== Chief of Staff of the Army ==
The C-in-Cs were assisted by Chiefs of Staff (COS), as prior to the formation of the Pakistan Army, the General Headquarters was an HQ of the Northern Command of the British Indian Army and there had been the appointment of the Chief of Staff under its commander, this trend continued in independent Pakistan's newly created army headquarters (GHQ). The last Chief of Staff was General Abdul Hamid Khan, who served till 1971. Another noted chief of staff was Lieutenant General Nasir Ali Khan in 1950s.

== See also ==
- Military dictatorship in Pakistan
