= Democracy in Pakistan =

Politics in Pakistan refers to the ideologies and systems by which Pakistan was established in 1947. As envisaged by the nation's founding father, Muhammad Ali Jinnah, Pakistan is a nation-state, constitutionally a democratic parliamentary republic. The national cabinet, led by the Prime Minister of Pakistan has executive power and the president is the head of state elected by the electoral college. Pakistan's political system is based on an elected form of governance. The democratic elections held in 2008 were the first to conclude a 5-year term in the nation's political history. However, since the country's inception, the military has had disproportionate power over state affairs. Several military interventions have disrupted Pakistan's democracy. These interventions include takeovers by General Ayub Khan (1958-1969), General Yahya Khan (1969-1971), General Zia Ul Haq (1977-1988), and General Pervez Musharraf (1999-2008).

== History ==
In the wake of intensifying political instability, the civilian bureaucracy and military assumed governing power in 1958. Since its independence, Pakistan's political system has fluctuated between civilian and military governments at various times throughout its political history, mainly due to political instability, civil-military conflicts, political corruption, and the periodic coup d'états by the military establishment against weak civilian governments, resulting in the enforcement of martial law across the country (occurring in 1958, 1977 and 1999, and led by chief martial law administrator-generals Ayub Khan, Zia-ul-Haq and Pervez Musharraf respectively). Democracy in Pakistan, however imperfect, has been allowed to function to varying degrees.

The 2018 Pakistani general election was allegedly interfered with by the Pakistan Army. An year earlier, the army had a fallout with Nawaz Sharif for attempting to curb the military's traditional dominance of politics. Sharif was removed from office after his disqualification by the Supreme Court and subsequently sentenced to seven years in prison on corruption charges. Sharif deniend wrongdoing while suggesting a collusion between the courts and the military. In a HARDtalk interview, Haroon Hameed, the then CEO of Dawn, claimed that Pakistan Army had influence over the elections. Hameed cited the military’s social media and use of bots and trolls by the intelligence agencies. He additionally mentioned censorship faced by media outlets like Geo TV and Dawn.

The 2024 Pakistani general election while deeply flawed and with claimed electoral irregularities demonstrates a "continuity of an electoral process that has historically been subject to political engineering". A February Gallup poll ahead of the election found that around 70 percent of Pakistanis lacked confidence in the honesty of their elections.

== Current status ==
Until 2013, Pakistan did not experience a democratic transfer of power from one democratically elected government that had completed its tenure to another. All of its previous democratic transitions have been aborted by military coups. In 2024 Pakistan was autocratizing according to V-Dem Democracy indices.

== See also ==
- Censorship in Pakistan
- 1970 Pakistani general election#Aftermath
- Military coups in Pakistan
- Secularism in Pakistan
- Socialism in Pakistan
- Military dictatorship in Pakistan
