= Military dictatorship in Pakistan =

1958–1971, 1977–1988, 1999–2008 periods

Military Dictatorship in Pakistan پاکستان میں فوجی آمریت
- 1958–1971, 1977–1988, 1999–2008
- Flag Coat of arms
- Status: Military regime
- Capital: Islamabad (from 1967), previously Karachi
- Largest city: Karachi
- Official languages: Urdu (national), English (official)
- Religion: Islam (state religion)
- President / Chief Martial Law Administrator / Chief Executive
  - 1958–1969: Ayub Khan
  - 1969–1971: Yahya Khan
  - 1977–1988: Zia-ul-Haq
  - 1999–2008: Pervez Musharraf
- Legislature: Suspended or Controlled (varied during military rule)
- Historical era: Cold War, War on terror
  - Coup by Ayub Khan (first established): 27 October 1958
  - End of the 1968–69 Pakistan revolution (first abolished and second established): 25 March 1969
  - End of the 1971 Pakistan Military Officer's Revolt (second abolished): 20 December 1971
  - Operation Fair Play (third established): 5 July 1977
  - 1988 PAF C-130B crash (third abolished): 17 August 1988
  - 1999 Pakistani coup d'état (fourth established): 12 October 1999
  - Return to civilian rule (fourth abolished): 18 August 2008
- Currency: Pakistani Rupee
- ISO 3166 code: PK
- Today part of: Pakistan; Bangladesh

Pakistan’s post-independence history has alternated between military-controlled civilian governments and periods of direct military rule. In four main episodes – under Ayub Khan (1958–1969), Yahya Khan (1969–1971), Zia-ul-Haq (1977–1988), and Pervez Musharraf (1999–2008) and one side chapter Iskander Mirza (1958). The country was governed by generals who seized power in coups and suspended democratic institutions.

In total, roughly half of Pakistan’s history (about 33 of 75 years) has been under military rule. Each regime imposed martial law or a controlled “guided” democracy, implementing its own constitutional changes and policies. These periods profoundly shaped Pakistan’s political trajectory, strengthening the military’s role and altering civil society, the judiciary, the media, and human rights.

== Origins of military rule ==
In all the cases of Military rule, a group of around 4 Military officials were usually behind the unfolding events. They were referred to as the Gang of Four, a quantified and common colloquial implicit term for the influential set of figures behind Pakistan's militarism and coups.

=== 1950s ===
- Ghulam Muhammad, Governor-General of Pakistan
- Iskander Mirza, Interior Minister and future President of Pakistan
- Ayub Khan, Commander-in-Chief of the Pakistan Army
- Chaudhri Muhammad Ali, Finance Minister and future Prime Minister of Pakistan

=== 1970s ===
- Yahya Khan, President and Chief Martial Law Administrator
- Abdul Hamid Khan, Interior Minister and acting Commander-in-Chief of the Army
- Nur Khan, Governor of West Pakistan
- S. M. Ahsan, Governor of East Pakistan (1969-1971)

=== 1980s ===
- Muhammad Zia-ul-Haq, Chief of the Army Staff and President
- Akhtar Abdur Rahman, Director-General of the Inter-Services Intelligence
- Khalid Mahmud Arif, Vice Chief of Army Staff
- Zahid Ali Akbar Khan, Engineer-in-Chief of the Army.

=== 1990s ===
- Ehsan ul Haq, Director-General of the Inter-Services Military Intelligence
- Aziz Khan, Force Commander of Northern Areas and Chief of the General Staff
- Mahmud Ahmed, Commander of X Corps and Director-General of the ISI
- Shahid Aziz, Director-General of the Inter-Services Military Operations

== Government types by period ==
Period	Government Type	Head of State	Major Military Conflicts
1958–1962	Military Dictatorship (Martial Law)	Ayub Khan	Bajaur Campaign
1962–1969	Dictatorial Presidential Republic	Ayub Khan	Kutch Conflict; Indo-Pakistani War of 1965
1969–1971	Authoritarian Military Dictatorship (Martial Law)	Yahya Khan	Bangladesh Liberation War; Indo-Pakistani War of 1971
1977–1985	Military Dictatorship (Martial Law)	Zia-ul-Haq	Siachen Conflict
1985–1988	Dictatorial Presidential Republic	Zia-ul-Haq	Soviet–Afghan War
1999–2002	Military Rule (Chief Executive)	Pervez Musharraf	Kargil War; 2001-02 India-Pakistan standoff
2002–2008	Dictatorial Presidential Republic	Pervez Musharraf	War in North-West Pakistan

== Ayub Khan (1958–1969) ==
Field Marshal Muhammad Ayub Khan (1907–1974) seized power in Pakistan in a military coup on 27 October 1958, deposing President Iskander Mirza. Ayub, a career soldier-turned-politician, declared martial law and assumed the titles of President and Chief Martial Law Administrator. In his first few years in office, Ayub Khan was approved of by almost all Pakistanis.

Suspending the 1956 Constitution, Ayub Khan sought to build a strong centralized state. In 1962, he promulgated a new presidential constitution, which replaced the parliamentary system with a presidential one and concentrated executive powers in his office. To secure political legitimacy, Ayub introduced the Basic Democracies system in 1959, a controlled electoral framework based on local councils ("basic democrats"), who later formed an electoral college to confirm his presidency through the 1965 presidential election. He defeated Fatima Jinnah, a major opposition figure in a controversial vote widely criticized for irregularities.

Ayub's regime prioritized economic modernization and industrialization. His government launched significant land reforms, initiated the Green Revolution in the Punjab to boost agricultural productivity, and encouraged industrial expansion, especially in textiles and cement sectors. Pakistan's GDP growth averaged over 7% annually during much of the 1960s, and The New York Times and other Western outlets hailed Pakistan as a model for developing economies.

Ayub’s administration also introduced progressive social reforms. The Muslim Family Laws Ordinance 1961 improved women's rights in marriage and inheritance, while pioneering state-led family planning initiatives to curb population growth, unprecedented in Pakistani history. Internationally, Ayub aligned Pakistan firmly with the Western Bloc during the Cold War. Pakistan joined SEATO (1954) and CENTO (1955) and received substantial foreign aid from the United States and later China, strengthening its military and economy.

Despite economic success, Ayub Khan's rule was increasingly viewed as authoritarian. He banned most political parties under the Political Parties Act of 1962, muzzled the press via the 1960 Press and Publications Ordinance, and repressed opposition movements including leftist labor unions, Pashtun, Baloch, and Bengali nationalist groups, as well as religious parties like Jamaat-e-Islami.

The Indo-Pakistani War of 1965 with India over the disputed region of Kashmir ended in a stalemate after the Tashkent Agreement, but it significantly damaged Ayub’s prestige at home. Many Pakistanis saw the war's inconclusive end as a national humiliation. From 1968 onwards, widespread discontent erupted into mass protests across West Pakistan and East Pakistan (modern-day Bangladesh), in what became known as the 1968–69 Pakistan revolution. Students, workers, peasants, and political activists united against Ayub's regime, demanding democratic reforms and the end of military rule.

Facing intense pressure, Ayub Khan agreed to hold talks with opposition leaders and promised constitutional reforms. However, unable to stem the growing unrest or secure a transition acceptable to all parties, he resigned on 25 March 1969, transferring power to the Commander-in-Chief General Yahya Khan, who imposed another period of martial law.

== Yahya Khan (1969–1971) ==
General Agha Muhammad Yahya Khan (1917–1980) assumed power on 25 March 1969 following the resignation of President Ayub Khan. Yahya immediately declared martial law and took on the roles of President, Chief Martial Law Administrator, Commander-in-Chief of the Pakistan Army, and Supreme Commander of the Pakistan Armed Forces, concentrating all executive, legislative, and military authority in his hands.

Upon assuming office, Yahya pledged to transition Pakistan back to civilian governance. His government initiated political reforms, notably the dissolution of the controversial One Unit policy, which had amalgamated the provinces of West Pakistan into a single administrative unit. This move restored the original provinces Punjab, Sindh, Balochistan, and North-West Frontier Province (NWFP) as separate entities.

In December 1970, Yahya oversaw Pakistan’s first general election based on the principle of direct adult franchise. The election, considered one of the fairest in Pakistan’s history, resulted in a landslide victory for the Awami League led by Sheikh Mujibur Rahman, which won 160 out of the 162 National Assembly seats allocated to East Pakistan. The PPP, led by Zulfikar Ali Bhutto, dominated West Pakistan but lacked an overall majority. However, the unwillingness of the West Pakistani political establishment to transfer power to the Awami League triggered a severe political crisis. Tensions heightened when Yahya postponed the opening of the National Assembly scheduled for March 1971, leading to mass civil disobedience and widespread protests across East Pakistan.

On 25 March 1971, after negotiations with Mujibur Rahman collapsed, Yahya Khan authorized the launch of Operation Searchlight, a brutal military crackdown intended to suppress the growing Bengali nationalist movements. The operation targeted political activists, students, and civilians, and is widely considered to have involved extensive human rights violations and mass killings. Estimates of the death toll vary, but most historians agree that hundreds of thousands of civilians perished. The atrocities committed during Operation Searchlight galvanized the Bangladesh Liberation War, as the Mukti Bahini (Bengali guerrilla forces) intensified their resistance with support from India.

On 3 December 1971, Pakistan launched pre-emptive Operation Chengiz Khan, a series of airstrikes against Indian airbases, aiming to neutralize India's capability to intervene. However, India responded by launching a full-scale invasion of East Pakistan, leading to rapid Pakistani military collapse. On 16 December 1971, Yahya Khan ordered the Eastern Command of the Pakistan Army under Lieutenant General A. A. K. Niazi to surrender to the combined Indian and Mukti Bahini forces in Dhaka, resulting in the creation of the new sovereign state of Bangladesh.

In the aftermath of Pakistan's defeat, Yahya Khan faced widespread condemnation from both the public and some junior officers in the military establishment. On 20 December 1971, under intense pressure, he resigned from the presidency and handed over power to Zulfikar Ali Bhutto, who assumed control as both President and Chief Martial Law Administrator.

== Zia-ul-Haq (1977–1988) ==
General Muhammad Zia-ul-Haq (1924–1988) seized power in a bloodless coup on 5 July 1977, overthrowing Prime Minister Zulfikar Ali Bhutto and his elected government. Declaring martial law, Zia became the Chief Martial Law Administrator, while retaining his position as Chief of Army Staff (Pakistan). Although he initially pledged to hold fresh elections within 90 days, he indefinitely postponed them and consolidated power.

In April 1979, Bhutto was controversially tried, convicted of ordering a political assassination, and executed by hanging under Zia’s rule, a decision widely criticized internationally as politically motivated. With his chief rival eliminated, Zia embarked on a program of Islamization, later known as Ziaism.

Zia's Islamization policies fundamentally reshaped Pakistan’s legal and social systems. His regime promulgated the Hudood Ordinances in 1979, instituting Islamic punishments (hudud) for offenses like adultery, theft, and consumption of alcohol. The 1984 Law of Evidence devalued women's testimony to half that of a man’s in financial matters. Economic changes included the promotion of Islamic banking and the mandatory zakat (charity) deduction system.

In parallel, Zia restructured the political system to entrench military dominance. He suspended the 1973 Constitution of Pakistan, dissolved Parliament, banned political parties, and ruled through a tightly controlled Majlis-e-Shura (consultative council) appointed by decree. In the 1985 Pakistani general election, Zia permitted elections on a strictly non-party basis, appointing Muhammad Khan Junejo as Prime Minister, though retaining decisive authority.

Internationally, Zia forged a strong alliance with the United States and Saudi Arabia during the Soviet–Afghan War. Pakistan became a key base for U.S.-funded Mujahideen insurgents fighting Soviet forces in Afghanistan, which in turn flooded Pakistan with weapons, militants, and narcotics. Observers note that Zia’s decade-long rule "fundamentally transformed Pakistan’s polity, creating an almost entirely theocratic form of government." During this period, sectarianism flourished, with Sunni militant groups gaining prominence, while blasphemy laws were expanded to target minorities and dissenters.

Zia’s rule ended abruptly on 17 August 1988, when he died in a plane crash near Bahawalpur under mysterious circumstances, along with several senior military officials and the U.S. ambassador to Pakistan. His death paved the way for the 1988 Pakistani general election and a brief restoration of civilian rule under Benazir Bhutto.

== Pervez Musharraf (1999–2008) ==
General Pervez Musharraf (1943–2023) staged Pakistan’s most recent military coup on 12 October 1999. In a swift takeover, he ousted elected Prime Minister Nawaz Sharif, imposed a state of emergency, and placed Sharif, along with his cabinet, under house arrest while the Pakistan Army seized key institutions, airports, and media outlets. Musharraf, then Chief of Army Staff, appointed himself Chief Executive of Pakistan and later President of Pakistan, dissolving the National Assembly but promising to hold future elections.

In October 2002, general elections were held under the framework of Musharraf’s controversial Legal Framework Order, 2002, which reshaped Pakistan’s constitution and bolstered presidential powers. Through a powerful, military-dominated National Security Council (Pakistan) and new political parties like the Pakistan Muslim League (Q), Musharraf secured a parliamentary majority and consolidated his position.

Following the September 11 attacks in 2001, Musharraf aligned Pakistan closely with the United States in the war on terror, receiving billions in United States foreign aid. Early in his rule, he liberalized the Economy of Pakistan, encouraging privatization and deregulation. Pakistan experienced notable economic growth rates between 2002 and 2007. Private media expanded rapidly, with numerous television channels flourishing during his tenure.

However, Musharraf’s regime remained authoritarian. Opposition parties faced crackdowns; prominent politicians like Nawaz Sharif and Benazir Bhutto were exiled or marginalized through legal and political maneuvers. In late 2007, under mounting pressure from judicial activism and political opposition, Musharraf declared another state of emergency on 3 November. He suspended the Constitution of Pakistan, dismissed the Supreme Court of Pakistan (which was expected to rule against his dual role as president and army chief), and shut down independent media channels. His actions triggered mass protests, led notably by the Lawyers' Movement advocating for the restoration of the judiciary and rule of law.

After suffering heavy defeats in the February 2008 elections, and facing the threat of impeachment by the new parliament, Musharraf resigned as President on 18 August 2008 and departed Pakistan for self-imposed Exile. His resignation marked the end of nearly nine years of military-dominated governance.

== Impact on civil society, judiciary, media and institutions ==
Pakistan’s repeated cycles of military rule have had deep and lasting impacts on its institutions and society. Each dictatorship restructured the legal and political framework to concentrate power in the executive. Coups were often retroactively legitimized by pliant courts invoking the Doctrine of necessity, significantly weakening judicial independence. Under Zia and Musharraf, judges who resisted military authority were dismissed, arrested, or coerced, while handpicked benches validated military orders. For example, Musharraf’s 2007 state of emergency required judges to swear loyalty under a new Provisional Constitutional Order; those who refused, including Chief Justice Iftikhar Muhammad Chaudhry, were removed. A compliant judiciary sanctioned extra-constitutional laws, including Zia’s Islamization measures and Musharraf’s constitutional amendments. Power shifted decisively to the presidency and military: Zia’s Eighth Amendment and Musharraf’s Legal Framework Order, 2002 gave the president unilateral authority to dismiss elected governments, undermining the legislature.

Press and Civil liberties similarly eroded under military regimes. Censorship laws introduced during Ayub and expanded by Zia curtailed newspapers, textbooks, and broadcasting. Independent media outlets were closed or nationalized, and strict media ordinances restricted dissent. Although Musharraf initially encouraged private media expansion, his government reverted to heavy censorship during the 2007 Pakistani state of emergency, shutting down private television channels and harassing journalists.

Political freedoms were also restricted: opposition parties were banned (e.g., Zia banned all parties until the 1985 elections), protests outlawed, and public gatherings tightly controlled. Civil society organisations, especially those advocating human rights or regional autonomy, were often harassed, restricted, or dissolved.

Human rights abuses were widespread across all periods of military rule. Security forces faced credible accusations of Extrajudicial killings, Enforced disappearances, and Torture. Zia’s era institutionalized discrimination against women through the Hudood Ordinances and marginalized minorities. During Musharraf’s alliance with the U.S. in the war on terror, rights organizations reported secret detentions and abuses against terrorism suspects. In 2007–08, hundreds of judges, lawyers, journalists, and activists were detained during the crackdown on dissent. Fundamental freedoms of assembly, speech, and religion remained severely restricted during these periods.

Local governance and political participation were also manipulated. Military rulers often promoted ostensibly democratic local councils, such as Ayub’s Basic Democracies and Zia’s devolution programs,which scholars argue primarily served to centralize and legitimize military control. National elections were staged under heavily constrained conditions: restricted franchises, party-less formats, and engineered results. Analysts note that, despite formal electoral processes, it remained "essentially impossible to become prime minister without the military’s approval."

In sum, military rule has stunted the development of Pakistan’s Civil institutions and democratic norms. Each coup weakened the legislature, marginalized political parties, and deepened a pattern of impunity. Even long after formal transitions back to civilian government, the military continues to exercise substantial influence over civil society and state governance.

== Contemporary role of the military in governance ==
Although Pakistan has officially returned to civilian rule since the 2008 Pakistani general election, the Pakistan Armed Forces, particularly the Pakistan Army, continue to wield significant influence over governance and decision-making from behind the scenes.

=== Establishment and hybrid regimes ===
The term "Establishment" is often used to refer to the alliance between military, intelligence, and select bureaucratic and judicial actors. Since 2008, Pakistan has been described as a “hybrid regime” where elected governments operate under informal military oversight.

=== Political engineering and civilian manipulation ===
Pakistan’s military has played a major role in shaping electoral outcomes and party politics. Before the 2018 Pakistani general election, it was accused of favoring Pakistan Tehreek-e-Insaf (PTI), pressuring opposition candidates, influencing media coverage, and intimidating dissenting voices.

=== Foreign and strategic policy ===
On issues such as relations with India, Afghanistan, and the CPEC, the military remains the dominant policymaker, overshadowing civilian institutions like the Foreign Office.

=== Judiciary and media influence ===
The military retains informal control over parts of the judiciary and the media. Judges who are seen as opposing military preferences have reportedly faced pressure or removal, while favored rulings often align with military interests. Media outlets are subject to censorship, enforced disappearances of journalists, and indirect control through regulatory bodies.
