= 1953–1954 Pakistani constitutional coup =

1953 military takeover of government in Pakistan

Governor-General Ghulam Mohammad dismissed Pakistani Prime Minister Khawaja Nazimuddin's government in 1953 despite the Prime Minister enjoying the support of the Constituent Assembly and, subsequently, dismissed Pakistan's first constituent assembly in 1954, steps later described as Pakistan's constitutional coup given that Ghulam Mohammad was the representative of the head of state and Queen of Pakistan, Elizabeth II.

== Background ==
Pakistan was formed in 1947. Its constituent assembly was made up of Pakistani delegates from elections in British India in 1946 and in 1947. It attempted to produce a constitution and act as an interim parliament.

Malik Ghulam Muhammad dismissed the Nazimuddin government with General Ayub Khan's backing in April 1953 saying that he had been "driven to the conclusion that the cabinet of Khawaja Nazimuddin has proved entirely inadequate to grapple with the difficulties facing the country", although the government had won the confidence of the House only a fortnight earlier. General Ayub himself admitted at a news conference at the Governor's House in Karachi in October 1964, that "when there was a conflict between him (Khawaja Nazimuddin) and Governor-General, I decided to side with the Governor-General."

== History ==
On 24 October 1954, the Constituent Assembly amended the Government of India Act 1935. The amendments precluded the Governor-General from acting except on the advice of his ministers. In retaliation Ghulam Mohammad dissolved the Constituent Assembly itself, at a time when it had almost finalized the draft of the constitution, only because the members of the Assembly's sub-committee had decided to curtail his powers. This he did with the active support of General Ayub Khan.

== Aftermath ==
=== Judicial review ===
Ghulam Mohammad's action was condoned by the federal judiciary in particular by Justice Munir in the case Federation of Pakistan v. Maulvi Tamizuddin Khan.

Justice Munir, ruled in favour of the dismissal in the Maulvi Tamizuddin Khan's case, declaring that the Assembly was not a sovereign body. Munir declared that the Constitutional Assembly had "lived in a fool's paradise if ever seized with the notion that it was the sovereign body of the state."

According to Munir, the independence Muhammad Ali Jinnah gained for his country was restricted by the prerogative rights of the Crown. He adopted the argument made to the court by Lord Diplock that Pakistan did not become independent in 1947; it had attained a status the same as that Munir felt the senior Dominions possessed, virtually indistinguishable from independence.

The conclusion reached by Justice Cornelius in his dissenting opinion was entirely different. He answered Munir's interpretation of Commonwealth history with his own understanding of the meaning of a dominion. He maintained that the historical fact was that Pakistan had been created with complete independence, and he pointed to what he believed to be clear differences in the status of the senior dominions and the new dominion of Pakistan. Cornelius stressed that Pakistan was an independent state.

According to Allen McGrath, author of the Destruction of Pakistan's Democracy, when Munir denied the existence of the Assembly's sovereignty, he destroyed Pakistan's existing constitutional basis. He did further harm when he did not indicate where sovereignty resided. He thereby created a vacuum which was an opportunity for Ghulam Mohammad.

To support Ghulam Mohammad's use of non-constitutional emergency powers, Munir found it necessary to move beyond the constitution to what he claimed was the common law, to general legal maxims, and to English historical precedent. He relied on Bracton's maxim "that which is otherwise not lawful is made lawful by necessity", and the Roman law maxim urged by Jennings, "the well-being of the people is the supreme law." This was to be used as legal justification for all subsequent martial laws.

This coup marked the end of the Muslim League created by Muhammad Ali Jinnah and the beginning of the overt assumption of power by the Pakistan bureaucracy with the military's assistance. By 1958 the military was to step in openly.

== See also ==
- Military coups in Pakistan
- King–Byng Affair, a Canadian constitutional crisis in 1926
- 1975 Australian constitutional crisis
- 2008–09 Canadian parliamentary dispute
- 2011–12 Papua New Guinean constitutional crisis
- 2013 Tuvaluan constitutional crisis
