= Dosso case =

Famous constitutional case in Pakistan

Dosso v. Federation of Pakistan
- Court: Supreme Court of Pakistan
- Decided: 27 December 1958; 66 years ago
- Citation: P.L.D. 1958 S.C. 533

Ruling
- Decision of Lahore High Court was reversed and martial law was legitimized

Court membership
- Judges sitting: Justices; Muhammad Munir; Muhammad Shahabuddin; Alvin Robert Cornelius; Amiruddin Ahmad

Laws applied
- Doctrine of necessity, Laws (Continuance in Force) Order 1958

Dosso v. Federation of Pakistan was the first constitutional case after the promulgation of the Constitution of Pakistan of 1956 and an important case in Pakistan's political history. The case gained prominence as it indirectly questioned the first martial law imposed by President Iskander Mirza in 1958.

Dosso was a tribal person from district Loralai in Baluchistan then under Provincially Administered Tribal Areas who committed a murder. He was arrested by tribal authorities and handed over to the Loya jirga who convicted him under the Frontier Crimes Regulation (FCR). Relatives of Dosso challenged the decision in Lahore High Court (then the West Pakistan High Court) who ruled in favour of Dosso. The Federal Government appealed the decision to the Supreme Court of Pakistan who reversed the High Court's decision by referring to the Hans Kelsen theory of legal positivism.

== Case facts ==
Dosso was a resident of the Loralai tribal district who committed a murder. He was arrested by the Levis Forces who handed him over to the tribal authorities and was eventually trialed by Loya Jirga. He was charged with murder under section 11 of the FCR 1901 and was convicted by the Loya Jirga. Dosso's relatives challenged the decision in the Lahore High Court. The High Court considered the case according to the 1956 constitution of Pakistan and ruled in favour of Dosso. In its ruling, the High Court declared the FCR was repugnant to the constitution, specifically that Dosso was entitled to equality before law under articles 5 and 7 of the constitution. The Loya Jirga's decision was therefore quashed. The Federal Government of Pakistan filed an appeal in the Supreme Court of Pakistan and the High Court decision was overturned.

== Hearing in High Court ==
Relatives of Dosso filed a petition against his conviction by the Loya Jirga in the West Pakistan High Court (Lahore High Court), arguing that he was a citizen of Pakistan and hence must be tried according to Pakistani laws, and not the FCR. Articles 5 and 7 of the Constitution of Pakistan of 1956 stated that all citizens were equal and were to receive a fair trial under the law. Dosso's relatives also challenged the relevant provisions of FCR as unconstitutional under against Articles 5 and 7.

=== High Court judgment ===
The High Court decided the case in favour of Dosso and declared the FCR as unconstitutional.

== Supreme Court hearing ==
The Federal Government of Pakistan appealed the decision in the Supreme Court of Pakistan and a hearing date was set for 13 October 1958.

=== Martial law 1958 ===
On 7 October 1958, the President Iskander Mirza imposed martial law and appointed the Commander-in-Chief of Pakistan Army General Ayub Khan as the Chief Martial Law Administrator (CMLA). All of the government machinery; legislatures, central and provincial were dissolved.

After three days of martial law, the Laws (Continuance in Force) Order 1958 came into effect, replacing the constitution but continuing all other laws and restoring the jurisdiction of all courts.

==== Impacts of Martial law on the case ====
Martial law impacted the case significantly and raised the important technical legal point that if the Supreme Court maintained the decision of Lahore High Court, it followed that the old constitution was still in force since that decision was decided under articles 5 and 7 of the Constitution of Pakistan 1956. It was also argued that if this was the case, and the old constitution could still be invoked, then the status of the martial law regulations and the Laws (Continuance in Force) Order 1958 could also be challenged.

=== Supreme Court judgment ===
The Supreme Court decided the case under the new laws and quashed the decision of the Lahore High Court. The Supreme Court bench, headed by Justice Munir, based its decision on Hans Kelsen's General Theory of Law and State.

==== Effect of Supreme Court judgment ====
The judgment legitimized the martial law of 1958 as a bloodless coup and stated that since it was not resisted or opposed by the public, this implied that the public accepted the legitimacy of the new regime. According to the Supreme Court, the Laws (Continuance in Force) Order 1958 was valid and abrogated the old constitution. Furthermore, it was held that since the constitution was abrogated, but all the older laws remained in force, this meant that FCR 1901 could not be unconstitutional and was therefore still in force and the decision of Loya jirga to convict Dosso was lawful.

== Significance of Supreme Court judgment ==
The Dosso case has a far-reaching effect on the political history of Pakistan. The recognition of martial law based on Kelsen's theory was subsequently applied in many other cases in Pakistan.

=== Impact on the politics of Pakistan ===
The Supreme Court's judgment in Dosso case greatly impacted the politics in Pakistan and opened the door for the legitimization of three subsequent martial laws, resulting in CMLA Ayub Khan ruling the country for the following decade. The decision also disturbed ties between East and West Pakistan which were eventually settled by establishing parity between both wings and incorporating both Urdu and Bengali as national languages. The decision of the Supreme Court also validated the British implied legacy of Frontier Crimes Regulation ("Black Law") which continued to be enforced in the tribal region till 2018.

=== Independence of Judiciary ===
The decision of the Supreme Court of Pakistan has been criticized for undermining the independence of the judiciary and the democratic process by validating the suspension of the constitution and the imposition of martial law.

== See also ==
- Federation of Pakistan v. Maulvi Tamizuddin Khan
- 1958 Pakistani coup d'état
