= Uganda v Commissioner of Prisons, Ex Parte Matovu =

High Court of Uganda decision in 1966

Uganda v Commissioner of Prisons, ex parte Michael Matovu
- Court: High Court of Uganda
- Decided: 1966
- Citations: [1966] 1 EA, at p.514

Court membership
- Judges sitting: Egbert Udo Udoma, CJ; Sheridan and Jeffreys Jones, JJ.

Keywords
- Political Question Doctrine, Kelsen theory, legality of government and Constitution, legal order

Uganda v. Commissioner of Prisons, Ex Parte Michael Matovu, [1966] 1 EA 514, is a decision of the High Court of Uganda in which Hans Kelsen's "General Theory on Law and State" and the Political Question Doctrine were considered in determining the legal validity of Uganda's 1966 Constitution. The 1966 Constitution had come into place following what was by and large, a coup d'état executed by Apollo Milton Obote when he seized all powers of government and suspended Uganda's 1962 Independence Constitution, eventually leading to its abolition.

== Facts ==
On February 22, 1966, Uganda's Prime Minister, Apollo Milton Obote, issued a statement to the nation in which he announced that he had assumed all powers of government in the interest of “national stability, public security and tranquility”. Two days later, he suspended the 1962 Constitution of Uganda. However, the parts of the Constitution relating to, inter alia; the courts, the civil service, the armed forces and the National Assembly were preserved for continuity of the basic functioning of the state.

On April 15, 1966, Uganda's National Assembly abolished the 1962 Constitution by resolution and replaced it with the 1966 Constitution to be in force pending the establishment of a Constituent Assembly to draft and pass a new Constitution (this later came to be the 1967 Constitution). Under the new Constitution, all executive authority was vested in the President, in this case Apollo Milton Obote, to be exercised with the advice and consent of cabinet. Former President, Sir Edward Mutesa was consequently evicted from the State House and eventually forced to flee into exile. The new Constitution also abolished the federal states that had been created by its predecessor.

The Applicant in this case, Michael Matovu, also the Saza Chief of Buddu in Buganda Kingdom, was arrested on May 22, 1966, and detained at Masindi Prison under the provisions of the Deportation Ordinance. He was subsequently transferred to Luzira Prison in Buganda Kingdom. On May 23, 1966, a state of emergency was declared in Buganda Kingdom by proclamation and this was later confirmed by the National Assembly which also passed new legislation governing such states of emergency in form of the Emergency Powers Act and the Emergency Powers (Detention) Regulations. Michael Matovu was released from prison on July 16, 1966 and ordered to leave. However, he was re-arrested upon stepping outside the Prison and consequently re-detained, this time under the emergency powers laws.

The Minister of Internal Affairs ordered his detention on August 10, 1966, and the said detention order was served on him in prison the next day. A fortnight later, he appeared before a tribunal for review of his case. On September 6, 1966, Michael Matovu filed, through his advocate, what purported to be an application for the prerogative writ of habeas corpus under Section 349 of the Criminal Procedure Code of Uganda. However, his application involved the need to answer various questions requiring constitutional interpretation and so the presiding judge, Jeffreys Jones, J, referred the matter to a 3-member bench of the Court (Udo Udoma, CJ; Sheridan and Jeffreys Jones, JJ) for hearing and determination of the Constitutional questions (not the application for the writ of habeas corpus per se).

The issues for determination revolved about the competence of the Application, the Constitutional validity of the emergency powers laws and therefore by extension, the constitutionality or legal validity of Michael Matovu's detention. The most important issue however, and the core of this precedent, turned out to be the question of the 1966 Constitution's validity. No doubt, the roots of this 1966 Constitution lay in an extra-constitutional act to wit, a coup d'état or revolution perpetrated by Apollo Milton Obote when he seized all powers of government.

== Holding/Analysis ==
=== "Jettisoning formalism to the winds" ===
In the first instance, the Court overlooked what would ordinarily be grave errors in the original application by Michael Matovu such as failure to file a notice of motion, name a proper respondent and reliance on defective affidavits. It considered that liberty of a citizen was at stake and so decided to let substance prevail over form.

“Indeed but for the fact that the application concerns the liberty of a citizen, the court would have been justified in holding that there no application properly before it. In the first place the affidavits as instituted and headed are defective. There is no respondent named against whom the writ is sought and to whom the writ should issue.”

=== Political Question Doctrine ===
The Court also heard arguments in respect of the validity of the 1966 Constitution. The Attorney General of Uganda argued that the question of validity of the Constitution was a Political question which the court was precluded from inquiring into as it was a matter properly within the exclusive province of the other branches of government. For this proposition, decisions such as Luther v. Borden and Marbury v. Madison from the United States were relied upon. The Court, while accepting that the Political Question Doctrine was a sound and applicable doctrine, declined to hold the view that the validity of the 1966 Constitution was a political question. In its view, it was vested with power to interpret the Constitution and this power involved inquiring into the validity of a new Constitution rather than resigning that duty to co-ordinate branches of government. The Court also seemingly differentiated between questioning the validity of government and questioning the validity of the Constitution. It opined that it had no power to do the former but could do the latter. A thin line, however, stands between the two concepts and it is difficult to fathom a substantial difference between them. Nevertheless, the Court was seeking to determine which Constitution was the reigning, supreme law of the land. Was it the 1962 Independence Constitution, or the 1966 Constitution? For no two Constitutions could simultaneously exist and additionally, the judges were, as a result of their judicial oaths the oath of allegiance, bound to uphold and protect the Constitution of Uganda as by law established. This particular argument thus failed as the Court did not view the validity of the Constitution per se, as a political question.

Having rejected the submission that the validity of the 1966 Constitution was a political question, the Court heard an alternative argument that incorporated Hans Kelsen's theory on how change in a state's basic norm may effectively create a new and valid legal order to replace the state's former legal order, thereby creating a new binding legal regime. The Attorney General submitted that under International Law, an independent and sovereign nation may have its government or Constitution changed by way of a coup d’état, where an abrupt political change destroys a pre-existing legal order and effectively replaces it in a manner that pre-existing legal order did not itself contemplate. It was thus argued that the suspension of the 1962 Constitution and seizure of all powers of government by Apollo Milton Obote in February 1962 was in fact a coup d’état. Added to this were the events of ejecting former President and Head of State (Sir Edward Mutesa) from the State House and in fact his subsequent escape beyond the territorial boundaries of Uganda coupled with inter alia, the abolition of federal states, closure of appeals to the Privy Council and the elimination of the High Court of Buganda. The apex of these events was of course the effective assumption by Apollo Milton Obote of the Executive Office of President. It was put to the Court that a coup d'état or revolution had occurred in Uganda, destroying the legal order underlying the 1962 Constitution and establishing the new legal order under which the 1966 Constitution was validly established. Reference was also made to how the new Constitution was effective, having been accepted by the masses as the new law. Further reliance was sought on the Pakistani Supreme Court decision in the Dosso case where the Kelsen theory was applied in a similar circumstance.

==== Kelsen's theory ====
Kelsen's theory does postulate that a "legal order" (basic norm) underlies every legal system which in turn consists of legal norms (binding rules of conduct). A legal order (basic norm) determines legal norms, which are valid as long as they are in accordance with the legal order establishing them. Legal Norms under a legal system may include periodic elections by which power is successively transferred, for example. Abiding by legal norms begets legitimacy and defying them creates illegitimacy. The legal order or basic norm however, is the hypothetical, whole underlying basis for a legal government. In essence, it is the source or point of origin of all law and authority in the state; the very foundation of validity. Kelsen stated that a change in a state's “legal order” or basic norm by way of revolution or coup d’état, which is a means not within the contemplation of the deposed legal order or system, creates a new valid government or Constitution if only the new legal order is efficacious in terms of control and recognition. Even when some of the legal content or legal norms of the deposed regime, for example preexisting laws, are preserved, they are in effect new norms because the reason for their validity has changed. Only their content is identical to the old norms.

″No jurist would maintain that even after a successful revolution the old constitution and the laws based thereupon remain in force, on the ground that they have not been nullified in a manner anticipated by the old order itself. Every jurist will presume that the old order – to which no political reality any longer corresponds – has ceased to be valid, and that all norms, which are valid within the new order, receive their validity exclusively from the new constitution. It follows that, from this juristic point of view the norms of the old order can no longer be recognized as valid norms.″ – Kelsen.

Kelsen emphasized that a new legal order must be effective in order to be valid, otherwise it becomes an illegality under the “still-valid” legal order it has failed to depose, exposing its perpetrators or architects to inter alia, treason charges. Kelsen additionally theorized that in international law, a revolution or coup d'état is a valid way of changing a government as long as the new legal order has effective control over the same territory as the one before it to the end that the identity of the State in question remains the same under international jurisprudence. Only its government changes, albeit through what domestically in that state, is an “illegal” means when you consider the deposed legal order's stipulations as to what is permissible as a mode of assuming power. On the international scene however, the new government becomes legitimate while the identity of the state remains the same.

″…by international law…the legal order remains the same as long as its territorial sphere of validity remains essentially the same, even if the order should be changed in another way than that prescribed by the Constitution, in the way of a revolution or coup d’etat. A victorious revolution or a successful coup d’etat does not destroy the identity of the legal order which it changes. The order established by revolution or coup d’etat has to be considered as a modification of the old order, not as a new order, if this order is valid for the same territory. The government brought into permanent power by a revolution or coup d’etat is, according to international law, the legitimate government of the State, whose identity is not affected by these events. Hence, according to international law, victorious revolutions or successful coups d’etat are to be interpreted as procedures by which a national legal order can be changed. Both events are, viewed in the light of international law, law creating fact. Again injuria jus oritur: and it is again the principle of effectiveness that is applied.″

In the Dosso v. Federation of Pakistan, the Supreme Court of Pakistan applied Kelsen's theory to determine that the Pakistani President's annulment of the 1956 Constitution of Pakistan and his imposition or declaration of martial law in 1958 amounted to a revolution that established a new legal order under which the law was to now be derived. Three days after annulling the 1956 Pakistani Constitution, the President had promulgated an order, the Laws (Continuance in Force) Order, which validated previous laws except the Constitution within the new legal order. Importantly, even the fundamental human rights that had been enshrined within Pakistan's 1956 Constitution were deemed to also have been excluded from the new legal order.

The Court (in ex parte Matovu) concluded that the Kelsenian principle was equally applicable in the case of Uganda and held that the 1966 Constitution was thus valid because it was the product of a successful revolution which had led to a new legal order, ousting that of the 1962 Constitution.

″Applying the Kelsenian principles, which incidentally form the basis of the judgment of the Supreme Court of Pakistan in the above case, our deliberate and considered view is that the 1966 Constitution is a legally valid constitution and the supreme law of Uganda; and that the 1962 Constitution having been abolished as a result of a victorious revolution in law does no longer exist nor does it now form part of the Laws of Uganda, it having been deprived of its de facto and de jure validity. The 1966 Constitution, we hold, is a new legal order and has been effective since April 14, 1966, when it first came into force.″

The Court also accepted various affidavits of key government officials as sufficiently demonstrative of the acceptance by the people, of the new legal order and hence equally demonstrative of its efficacy. Emphasis was laid on one particular affidavit, sworn by the Permanent Secretary of the Ministry of Foreign Affairs, in which it was stated that all foreign countries with which Uganda had relations had recognized the new government or legal order.

The Court drew a distinction between recognition of a new Head of State and the recognition of a new State all together. It however concluded that it was beyond its province to ‘accord recognition to the government’ of its own country; that it was obliged merely to abide by the Constitution, which Constitution originates its (the Court's) own existence and which Constitution exists only because the State supersedes it (the Constitution) in existence. That is to say, there can be no Constitution without a State. This appears to be a final reiteration of the Political Question Doctrine. The Court, in essence, was saying that legality of government, as opposed to legality of the Constitution, was beyond its scope of jurisdiction. Although, again, it is difficult to see how determination of Constitutional Validity is not a determination of legality of government.

″We would like to emphasize, however, that the question of the recognition of the new Head of State of Uganda by foreign nations is not strictly within the scope of this enquiry. For, in our view it is not within the province of this court, nor is it within its competence to accord recognition to the government or international status of the government of this country which is our own country. Courts, legislatures and the law derive their origins from the constitution, and therefore the constitution cannot derive its origin from them, because there can be no law unless there is already a state whose law it is, and there can be no state without a constitution.″

== Significance ==
Uganda v. Commissioner of Prisons, Ex Parte Matovu, commenced and sowed the seeds for the advent of the Political question Doctrine in Uganda. It has subsequently been applied in landmark decisions such as Attorney General v. Major General David Tinyefunza, Constitutional Appeal No. 1 of 1997, wherein it was extensively applied by Justice George Wilson Kanyeihamba to distance the Court from the affairs of the army and the Executive authority over it, save in a few select, necessary cases; and IPPR v the Attorney General, Miscellaneous Application No.592 of 2014, in which the Applicant sought an injunction to bar the Ugandan government from enabling or sponsoring the exportation of qualified Ugandan medical doctors and nurses to Trinidad and Tobago. The Doctrine's effect has however been greatly curtailed, and nearly wiped out (seemingly) by the recent Supreme Court decision in CEHURD v the Attorney General, an appeal from the Country's Constitutional Court's decision in CEHURD v the Attorney General, Constitutional Petition No. 16 of 2011.

== See also ==
- Dosso v. Federation of Pakistan
- Marbury v. Madison
- Luther v. Borden
