= Local Councils Association of the Punjab =

Pakistani non-governmental organisation

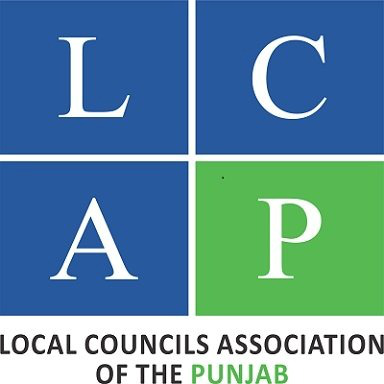
- Headquarters: House # 400, Block # B-2, Johar Town, Lahore
- Location: Pakistan
- President: Fozia Khalid Warriach
- Website: www.lcap.org.pk

Local Councils Association of Punjab is a Lahore-based organization that defends the interests of local governments in the Punjab province, Pakistan regardless of the size of the communities they serve.

== History ==
During Pervez Musharraf's regime in Pakistan (October 1999 to August 2008), a devolution plan was introduced, leading to the establishment of local governments across the country in 2001. The Canadian International Development Agency (CIDA) Devolution Support Project (CDSP) operated in Punjab from July 2003 to September 2008, aiming to strengthen the devolution process and the new local government system. Among its interventions, CDSP facilitated the creation of an Association of local governments in the province.

CDSP started the process of formulation of LCA in September 2004. After analyzing the situation of informal alliances and networks in Pakistan, CDSP and all other stakeholders came to the conclusion that the idea of establishing an association has to be a unique one that incorporates all local government stakeholders in it.

The establishment process had its origins in a series of discussions and consultations to design an institution that can serve the local needs. In a local elected representatives’ conference they decided to proceed with urgency to create a provincial local government Association. Since then extensive outreach was undertaken among elected officials and an Interim Joint Committee (IJC) was formed with a mandate to begin engagement with Districts, Provincial and Federal Governments on local governments’ priority issues. In December 2005, a study tour to the Philippines and Thailand was undertaken to expose IJC members and appropriate Provincial Government officials to the functioning and experiences of local government associations in those two countries.

A major step in the LCA development process was the formation of the IJC to model the structure, functioning and relations of the formal Association to be. During the next few months, extensive outreach was undertaken in nine additional districts of Punjab (besides Lodhran and Kasur) where there was strong interest in the formation of an Association. Given the intensive and extensive outreach that was done, strong and increasing support for the LCA at all levels of the local government system, the work and successful functioning of the IJC, and the lessons learned from the study tour, the immediate next target was the actual establishment of the formal LGA at a founding convention that was held in July 2006 in Lahore where the first board and presidency was elected. The ever-made Association of local governments was named “Local Councils Association of the Punjab (LCAP)”.

== Work ==
LCAP works to strengthen decentralization and local self-government in Punjab and to increase communication within the local governments., with upper governments and more particularly with the citizens. The organization also works to provide the local citizens access to basic services such as water, sanitation, health and transport. LCAP generates its revenue from Annual Membership Fee, Grants from different Development Partners for specific actions and interest on income from Bank Deposits.

== International affiliations ==
LCAP is a member of several global networks of local governments and their associations which include United Cities and Local Governments (UCLG), Commonwealth Local Government Forum (CLGF) and Local Governance Initiative and Network (LOGIN). LCAP is also in partnership with number of international institutions that provide trainings to local government functionaries around the year. Most prominent are International Urban Training Center (IUTC), the Hague Academy and Committee on Institutional Building (CIB).
