= Muhammad Munir =

Pakistani judge (1895–1979)

- محمد منیر

2nd Chief Justice of Pakistan
- In office 29 June 1954 – 2 May 1960
- Appointed by: Malik Ghulam Muhammad
- Preceded by: Abdul Rashid
- Succeeded by: Muhammad Shahabuddin

Personal details
- Born: 1895 Amritsar, Punjab, British India
- Died: 1979 (aged 83–84)
- Education: Government College University, Lahore

Muhammad Munir (Urdu: محمد منیر; 1895–1979) was the second Chief Justice of Pakistan, serving from 1954 to 1960.

== Background ==
Munir was born into a Kakkyzai Pashtun family and obtained his degree of master's in English Literature from Government College University, Lahore, he joined Punjab University Law College to earn his L.L.B. He started his career as a lawyer in Amritsar in 1921. He moved to Lahore in 1922.

== Career ==
Munir was appointed assistant advocate-general of Punjab in 1937, and first president of the Income Tax Appellate Tribunal of British India in 1940. He was elevated to the Bench of Judicature at Lahore in 1942. He and Justice Din Muhammad represented the All-India Muslim League on the Punjab Boundary Commission in 1947. The following year he was made the chairman of the Pakistan Pay Commission. In 1949, he was made the chief justice of the Lahore High Court.

=== Chief Justice ===
In 1954, Munir was made the chief justice of the Federal Court, chief justice of Pakistan. Besides being the chief justice, he also remained the chairman of the Delimitation Commission from June 1956 to July 1958. He retired on 2 May 1960.

In the major Federation of Pakistan v. Maulvi Tamizuddin Khan case, Munir invoked the doctrine of necessity, validating the dissolution of the first Constituent Assembly of Pakistan. The assembly was dissolved on 24 October 1954, by Governor General Ghulam Muhammad, an alumnus of Aligarh Muslim University. He has been widely criticized for validating the dissolution, although some of the Pakistani politicians had called for its dissolution. Due to Munir's ruling in the case, he has been perceived as a controversial figure, primarily due to his doctrine legitimizing the further dissolutions of assemblies.

He also validated 1958 Pakistani military coup by invoking doctrine of necessity.

== Writings ==
Justice Munir also wrote a book From Jinnah to Zia, arguing that Jinnah stood for a secular state.

== See also ==
- List of Pakistanis
- Chief Justice of Pakistan
- Doctrine of necessity

Legal offices
Preceded by Abdul Rashid	Chief Justice of Pakistan; 1954–1960	Succeeded by Muhammad Shahabuddin
