= Federation of Pakistan v. Maulvi Tamizuddin Khan =

Pakistani court case

- Court: Federal Court of Pakistan

Court membership
- Judges sitting: Muhammad Munir; Mohammad Sharif; S. A. Rehman; A.S.M. Akram; Alvin Robert Cornelius

Federation of Pakistan v. Maulvi Tamizuddin Khan (1955) was a court case of the Dominion of Pakistan. The Federal Court of Pakistan (now the Supreme Court of Pakistan) ruled in favor of the Governor General of Pakistan's dismissal of the 1st Constituent Assembly of Pakistan. The dismissal was legally challenged by Maulvi Tamizuddin Khan, the president of the assembly. Except one dissenting opinion, the majority of the court supported the dismissal on grounds of the doctrine of necessity. The verdict was considered a blow to democratic norms, which had ramifications in modern-day Pakistan and Bangladesh, and led to the dismissal being described as a constitutional coup.

== Facts ==
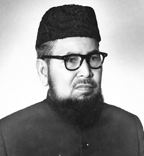
Maulvi Tamizuddin Khan challenged the Governor General's actions

In 1954, Governor General Ghulam Muhammad dissolved the Constituent Assembly of Pakistan. Earlier, he dismissed Prime Minister Khawaja Nazimuddin who enjoyed the confidence of the constituent assembly. Maulvi Tamizuddin Khan, the President of the Constituent Assembly and a representative from East Bengal, challenged the Governor General's actions in the Sindh High Court, where the dissolution was ruled as ultra vires by Chief Justice George Constantine. The federal government appealed in the country's apex Federal Court.

== Judgement ==
In 1955, the Federal Court led by Chief Justice Muhammad Munir ruled in support of the Governor General. The court suspended the decision of the High Court and held the Governor General, and not the Constituent Assembly, to be the sovereign authority. The court opined that royal assent can only be given by the Governor General as Pakistan was still a dominion and hence not a fully independent country. It gave the decision based on technical grounds that the section of Government of India Act of 1935 in question was not applied to this case because the governor general had not assent to it.

=== Dissent ===
A lone dissenting opinion was given by Justice Alvin Robert Cornelius who argued Pakistan was indeed an independent country within the Commonwealth.

== Significance ==
Some believe, the verdict dealt a blow to the notion of parliamentary supremacy in Pakistan, whereas Pakistan was already an independent dominion created by the Indian Independence Act 1947. The British parliament enjoyed parliamentary supremacy in its own realm. But the Federal Court's verdict stripped Pakistan's parliamentary supremacy, even though Pakistan itself was an independent realm headed by the Queen of Pakistan. The verdict paved way for the future judiciary to support unconstitutional and undemocratic actions, such as military coups. The doctrine of necessity was applied by successive Pakistani and Bangladeshi courts to validate the actions of martial law authorities.

== See also ==
- Dosso case
- Constitutional coup
- 1953 Pakistani constitutional coup
- Constitution of Pakistan
- Constitution of Bangladesh
- Bangladesh Italian Marble Works Ltd. v. Government of Bangladesh
