= Muhammad Shahabuddin =

Pakistani politician and judge (1895–1971)

- محمد شہاب الدین
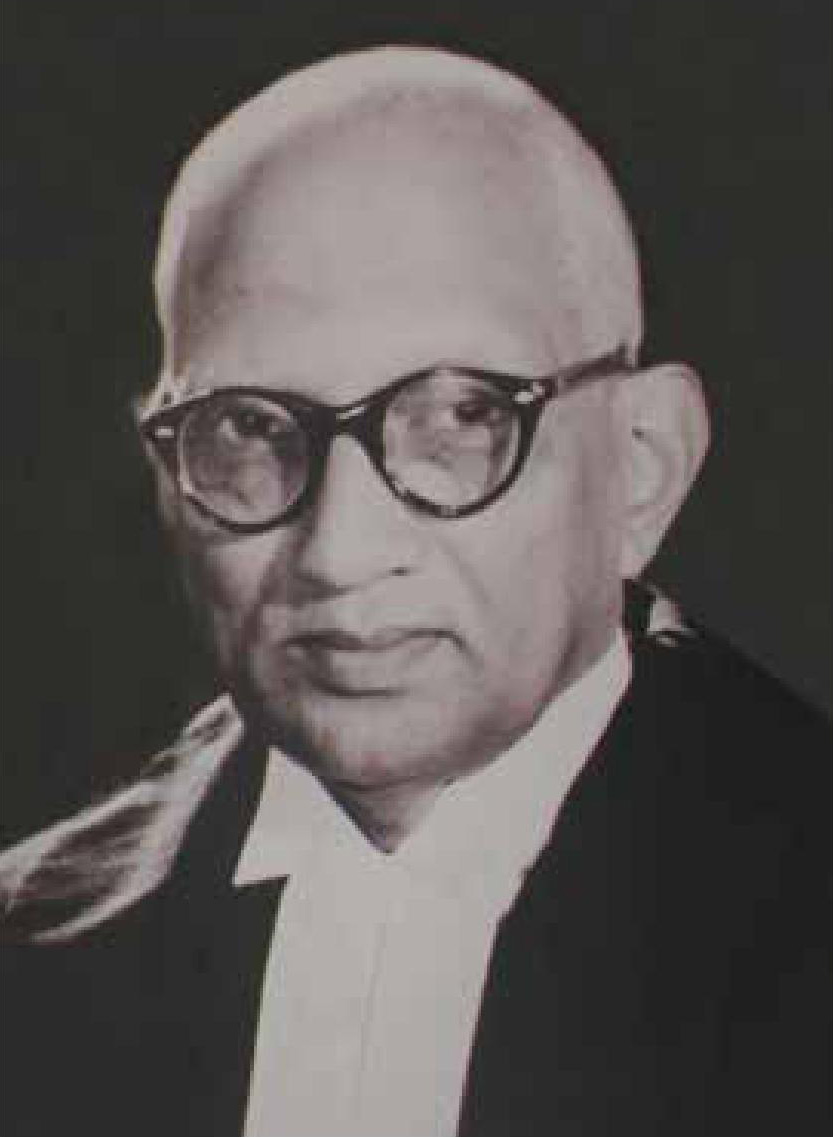

3rd Chief Justice of Pakistan
- In office 3 May 1960 – 12 May 1960
- Appointed by: Ayub Khan
- Preceded by: Muhammad Munir
- Succeeded by: Alvin Robert Cornelius

Acting Governor of East Bengal
- In office 22 December 1954 – 14 June 1955
- Preceded by: Iskander Ali Mirza (23rd October 1954)
- Succeeded by: Amiruddin Ahmad

Personal details
- Born: 13 May 1895 Eluru, Madras Presidency, British India
- Died: 13 April 1971 (aged 75) Lahore, Punjab, Pakistan
- Education: University of Madras; Government Law College, Chennai

Muhammad Shahabuddin (13 May 1895 – 13 April 1971) was the 3rd Chief Justice of Pakistan, serving from 3 May to 12 May 1960. He also served as acting Governor of East Bengal from 22 December 1954 to 14 June 1955.

== Early life ==
Shahabuddin was born on 13 May 1895 at Ellore in erstwhile Madras State to a Deccani Muslim family. He graduated in arts from Madras Christian College and in law from Madras Law College.

== Career ==
Shahabuddin joined the Indian Civil Service in November 1921 and was posted as a sub-collector at Madras. He later served as a joint magistrate and a district and session judge until February 1943 when he was appointed an additional judge of the Madras High Court. In September 1945 he was confirmed as a judge of the Madras High Court.

Shahabuddin was appointed as a judge of Dhaka High Court after the Partition. He served on the Indo-Pak Boundary Disputes Tribunal in 1949–50. He became the Chief Justice of the Dhaka High Court in February 1950. In 1953 he was appointed as a judge of the Federal Court. From 22 December 1954 to 14 June 1955 he acted as the Governor of East Bengal (Pakistan). Prime Minister Mohammad Ali Chaudhury handed over the government of East Pakistan to Abu Hossain Sarkar and made him Chief Minister on 3 June 1955. Shahabuddin was not told of the decision beforehand and as a result he resigned from the governorship on 4 June 1955. He became the Chief Justice of Pakistan in 1955. Shahabuddin also chaired the Constitution Commission.

== Death ==
Shahabuddin died on 13 April 1971 in Lahore, Pakistan.

== See also ==
- List of Pakistanis
- Chief Justice of Pakistan
