= 1958 Pakistani military coup =

1958 imposition of direct military control in Pakistan

- Part of the Military coups in Pakistan
Date	27 October 1958
Location	Pakistan
Result	Coup successful: Overthrow and exile of Iskander Ali Mirza; Martial law declared; Ayub Khan sworn in as President of Pakistan

Belligerents
(Pakistan) Pakistani Government	Pakistan Army

Commanders and leaders
Iskander Ali Mirza	Ayub Khan; Wajid Ali Khan Burki; Azam Khan; Khalid Shaikh

The 1958 Pakistani military coup was the first military coup in Pakistan that took place on 27 October 1958. It resulted in the toppling of Iskander Ali Mirza, the president of Pakistan, by Muhammad Ayub Khan, the commander-in-chief of the Pakistan Army.

On 7 October, Mirza abrogated the Constitution of Pakistan and declared martial law. Iskander Mirza had lost the support of many of the leading politicians and was alarmed at a plan by Huseyn Shaheed Suhrawardy to unite the political leadership of Bengal and Punjab against him. Therefore he turned to Ayub Khan and the military for help.

== Pre-coup crisis ==
The prelude to Ayub Khan's declaring martial law in Pakistan was fraught with political tension and sectarian politics in which the political establishment of the new country alienated its citizens through controversial governance and perceived political failings. Among the most controversial failings of the government were the continued uncertainty around canal water disputes causing a rift between the largely still agriculturally dependent economy of Pakistan's government and citizen farmers as well as the general geopolitical failure to adequately deal with the Indian threat to Pakistani Sovereignty in the disputed region of Jammu and Kashmir. In 1956 the Constituent Assembly of Pakistan approved a constitution that ended Pakistan's status as an independent Dominion of the British Empire, to create an Islamic Republic of Pakistan. Maj. Gen. Iskander Mirza, as the last Governor General of Pakistan, elected indirectly as the state's interim president. The new constitution was, however, followed by a period of political turmoil in Pakistan which further agitated the populace and factions within the military. In the two-year period between 1956 and 1958, this turmoil saw four prime ministers - Chaudhry Muhammad Ali, Huseyn Shaheed Suhrawardy, Ibrahim Ismail Chundrigar and Sir Feroz Khan Noon -in rapid succession. A precedent existed in Pakistan whereby a Governor-General—in 1956 that office belonged to Malik Ghulam Muhammad before its powers were assumed by the president—could dismiss a prime minister and rule by decree until a new government could be formed. Many viewed Mirza's use of this power as a deliberate manipulation of the constitution for his own ends. In particular, Mirza's One Unit scheme amalgamating the provinces of Pakistan into two wings - West Pakistan and East Pakistan - was politically controversial and proved difficult and costly to enforce. The quick succession of prime ministers as a result of Iskander Mirza's controversial actions fostered the view within the military that the public would support a coup against Pakistan's civil government and allow Ayub Khan to seize control of the country.

== Martial law ==
On October 7, President Iskander Mirza declared martial law in Pakistan. He abrogated the constitution of 1956, describing it as "unworkable" and full of "dangerous compromises." He dismissed the government of Sir Feroz Khan Noon, dissolved the National Assembly of Pakistan and the provincial legislatures. Mirza also proceeded to outlaw all political parties. He appointed General Ayub Khan, the Commander-in-Chief of the Pakistani army as the Chief Martial Law Administrator and nominated him to become the new Prime Minister of Pakistan, charged with administering the country.

== Military coup ==
On October 27, Iskander Mirza resigned from the presidency, transferring it to Ayub Khan. He was pressured to resign by Lieutenant Generals Azam Khan, Wajid Ali Khan Burki, and Khalid Shaikh. Both men saw the other as a rival to their respective positions. Mirza believed his own position had become largely redundant after Ayub Khan assumed most executive powers as chief martial law administrator and prime minister, and acted to assert himself, while Ayub Khan thought Mirza was conspiring against him. It is said that Ayub was alerted of Mirza's plan to have him arrested on his return from Dhaka. It is widely held that Ayub Khan and generals loyal to him forced Mirza to resign. Mirza was later taken to Quetta, the capital of the province of Baluchistan, before being exiled on November 27 to London, England, where he resided until his death in 1969.

== Aftermath ==
The coup was received positively in Pakistan as relief from unstable governments and weak political leadership. There was hope that strong central leadership could stabilise the economy and promote modernisation and the restoration of a stable form of democracy. The Ayub Khan regime was also supported by foreign governments such as the United States.

Ayub Khan combined the offices of president and prime minister, becoming both the head of state and government. He created a cabinet of technocrats, diplomats, and military officers. These included Air Marshal Asghar Khan, Md. Hafizur Rahman, A. K. Khan, Muhammad Ibrahim and Zulfikar Ali Bhutto, the future prime minister. In contrast, with future Pakistani military rulers such as Gen. Zia-ul-Haq and Gen. Pervez Musharraf, Ayub Khan did not seek to hold the posts of president and army chief simultaneously. He appointed Gen. Muhammad Musa as the new commander-in-chief. Ayub Khan also obtained judicial validation of his move when the Supreme Court of Pakistan validated and legalised his take-over under the "Doctrine of necessity."

== See also ==
- Dosso case
