= Chief Martial Law Administrator =

Head of a military government

The office of the chief martial law administrator (CMLA) was a senior and authoritative post created in countries such as Pakistan, Bangladesh and Indonesia that gave considerable executive authority and powers to the holder of the post to enforce martial law in the country in events to ensure the continuity of government. This office has been used mostly by military officers staging a coup d'état. On some occasions, the office has been under a civilian head of state.

== Pakistan ==
Some famous holders of this post in Pakistan include:

No.	Portrait	Name (birth–death)	Term of office			
No.	Portrait	Name (birth–death)	Took office	Left office	Note(s)	Time in office
1	A black and white portrait of Ayub Khan	Ayub Khan (1907–1974)	7 October 1958	8 June 1962	Field Marshal Ayub Khan held the post under President Iskandar Ali Mirza.	3 years, 244 days
2		Yahya Khan (1917–1980)	25 March 1969	20 December 1971	General Yahya Khan held the post simultaneously as the President of Pakistan.	2 years, 270 days
3		Zulfikar Ali Bhutto (1928– 1979)	20 December 1971	14 August 1973	Zulfikar Ali Bhutto became the first civilian to hold this post in Pakistan after the secession of East Pakistan.	1 year, 237 days
4		Muhammad Zia-ul-Haq (1924–1988)	16 September 1978	17 August 1988	General Muhammad Zia-ul-Haq held this office under President Fazal Ilahi Chaudhry after overthrowing Prime Minister Bhutto.	10 years, 123 days
5	A portrait of Pervez Musharraf	Pervez Musharraf (1943–2023)	12 October 1999	21 November 2002	General Pervez Musharraf held this office under President Muhammad Rafiq Tarar, although it was styled as "Chief Executive of Pakistan"	3 years, 40 days

== Bangladesh ==
Some famous holders of this post in Bangladesh include:

No.	Portrait	Name (birth–death)	Term of office			Notes
No.	Portrait	Name (birth–death)	Took office	Left office	Time in office	Notes
1		Khaled Mosharraf (1937–1975)	3 November 1975	6 November 1975	4 days	Held this post in 1975 for four days after a bloodless coup only to be killed in a counter coup resulting from a popular uprising led by JSD leader retired Lt. Col. Abu Taher
2		Abu Sadat Mohammad Sayem (1916–1997)	6 November 1975	29 November 1976	1 year, 23 days	Held this post after Mosharraf's death while serving as the fifth president of Bangladesh.
3		Ziaur Rahman (1936–1981)	29 September 1976	6 April 1979	2 years, 189 days	Succeeded to this post during Sayem's presidency until the withdrawal of martial law a year after being elected as president.
4		Hussain Muhammad Ershad (1930–2019)	24 March 1982	11 November 1986	4 years, 232 days	Held this post after a bloodless coup overthrowing Abdus Sattar until withdrawal of martial law in 1986.

== Indonesia ==
In Indonesia, this post was briefly held by army chief Suharto, who seized power in 1966 and forced President Sukarno to resign in 1967. Sukarno had also enforced martial law during his tenure as President of Indonesia.

== See also ==
- Military coup
- Military regime
- Martial law
- Military government
- Military occupation
- Military coups in Bangladesh
- Military coups in Pakistan
- Coups d'état in Sudan
- Military coups in Nigeria
- Military coups in Argentina
