= Military coups in Pakistan =

Military coups in Pakistan began in 1958 when army chief Muhammad Ayub Khan overthrew and exiled president Iskandar Ali Mirza. Since its creation in 1947, Pakistan has spent several decades under military rule. These periods include 1958–1971, 1977–1988, and 1999–2008.

== 1953/54 constitutional coup ==
In 1953, the Governor-General Ghulam Muhammad dismissed the government of the Prime Minister Khawaja Nazimuddin despite it enjoying the support of the Constituent Assembly of Pakistan; then in 1954 he dismissed the Constituent Assembly itself to prevent it changing the constitution to restrict the Governor-General's powers. The failure of the courts to support representative institutions in Federation of Pakistan v. Maulvi Tamizuddin Khan provided a pattern which later led to more open military intervention against elected governments to be justified using a doctrine of necessity.

== 1958 coup ==
In 1958, Pakistan’s first President, Major General Iskandar Ali Mirza, dismissed the Constituent Assembly and the government of Prime Minister Feroz Khan Noon. He appointed army commander-in-chief Gen. Ayub Khan as Chief Martial Law Administrator. Thirteen days later, Mirza himself was exiled by Ayub Khan, who appointed himself president.

== 1971 Majors and Colonels revolt ==
In 1971, several military officers revolted against the government, compelling the government to resign and transferring power to Z.A Bhutto.

== 1977 coup (Operation Fair Play) ==
Operation Fair Play was the code name for the coup d'etat conducted at midnight on July 4, 1977, by the military, led by Chief of Army Staff General Zia-ul-Haq, against the government of then-Prime Minister Zulfikar Ali Bhutto. General Zia ordered the arrest of Bhutto, his ministers and other leaders of both the Pakistan People's Party and the Pakistan National Alliance. In a nationally televised address, General Zia announced that the National Assembly of Pakistan and all provincial assemblies were dissolved, and that the Constitution of Pakistan was suspended.

The martial law imposed by President General Zia introduced the strict form of conservatism that promoted the nationalist, religious and anti-sectarianist ideologies. Under Zia's dictatorship a heavy Islamization of the country took place (the emblem of which were the so called Hudud Ordinances), which steered the country away from Muhammad Ali Jinnah's non-sectarian vision.

== 1999 coup ==
In October 1999, senior officers loyal to army chief Gen. Pervez Musharraf arrested Prime Minister Nawaz Sharif and his ministers after thwarting the Sharif regime's attempt to dismiss Musharraf and prevent his plane from landing in Pakistan as he returned from a visit to Sri Lanka.

== Indirect intervention ==
The death of Muhammad Zia-ul-Haq in August 1988 led to the appointment of Ghulam Ishaq Khan as President. Khan had vast, unchecked Presidential powers and was known to be close to the Pakistani military. He had dismissed both Benazir Bhutto (1990) and Nawaz Sharif (1993) as Prime Ministers, though the latter dismissal resulted in his own resignation in what is known in Pakistan as the Abdul Waheed Kakar formula.

== Unsuccessful coup attempts ==
=== 1951 ===
There have been numerous unsuccessful coup attempts in Pakistani history. The first noted attempt was a planned coup, the Rawalpindi conspiracy in 1951 led by Maj. Gen. Akbar Khan along with left-wing activists and sympathetic officers against the government of Liaquat Ali Khan, Pakistan's first prime minister. Prominent poet-intellectual Faiz Ahmed Faiz was suspected of involvement.

=== 1973 ===
In 1973, Brig. Ali, Major Farouk Adam Khan, Squadron Leader Ghous, Colonel Aleem Afridi and Lt. Colonel Tariq Rafi plotted a coup against the government of Zulfiqar Ali Bhutto to establish a revolutionary military junta. However Colonel Aleem Afridi backed down and informed the government against the plot. The coup plotters were court martialed and arrested.

=== 1980 ===
In 1980, a plot by Maj. Gen. Tajammul Hussain Malik to assassinate Zia-ul-Haq on Pakistan Day on March 23, 1980, was exposed and thwarted.

=== 1984 ===
In 1984, General Zia ul Haq's regime faced another coup d'etat attempt, just four years after the failed plot of 1980. This time the coup was orchestrated by the leftist factions seeking to overthrow Zia and establish a populist military regime in the country. The attempt was foiled by Inter Services Intelligence and all the plotters were arrested.

=== 1995 ===
In 1995, a coup attempt against the government of Benazir Bhutto led by Maj. Gen. Zahirul Islam Abbasi with the support of Islamic extremists failed.

== See also ==
- Military dictatorship in Pakistan
- Military coups in Argentina
- Military coups in Bangladesh
- Military coups in Nigeria
- Sudanese coup d'état (disambiguation)
- Military coups in Turkey
- List of coups and coup attempts by country
