= Frontier Corps Balochistan (South) =

Pakistani paramilitary force

Frontier Corps Balochistan (South) سرحد واہنی بلوچستان (جنوبی)
- Logo of FC Balochistan South
- Abbreviation: FCB (S)

Agency overview
- Formed: 2017; 9 years ago

Jurisdictional structure
- Federal agency: Pakistan
- Operations jurisdiction: Pakistan
- Governing body: Ministry of Interior
- Constituting instrument: Frontier Corps Ordinance, 1959
- General nature: Federal law enforcement
- Specialist jurisdictions: Paramilitary law enforcement, counter insurgency, riot control; National border patrol, security, integrity

Operational structure
- Overseen by: Pakistan Army
- Headquarters: Turbat, Balochistan
- Elected officer responsible: Mohsin Raza Naqvi, Minister of Interior
- Agency executive: Major General Zafar Iqbal, Inspector General, FC Balochistan (South)
- Parent agency: Civil Armed Forces

The Frontier Corps Balochistan (South) (Urdu: سرحد واہنی بلوچستان (جنوبی), reporting name: FCB (S)), is a federal paramilitary force in Pakistan, operating in the southwestern part of the province of Balochistan, to overseeing the country's borders with Afghanistan and Iran and assist with maintaining law and order. It is one of four Frontier Corps with the others being: FC Khyber Pakhtunkhwa (North) and FC Khyber Pakhtunkhwa (South) stationed in Khyber Pakhtunkhwa province, and FC Balochistan (North) stationed in the northern part of Balochistan province.

The Frontier Corps are often confused with Frontier Constabulary as both forces abbreviated as ''FC''. Frontier Corps are group of four paramilitary forces officered by the Pakistan Army. On other hand, Frontier Constabulary is unified force officered by the Police Service of Pakistan.

The Corps is headed by a seconded inspector general, who is a Pakistan Army officer of at least major-general rank, although the force itself is officially under the jurisdiction of the Interior Ministry.

The Corps consists of several infantry regiments, themselves composed of one or more battalion-sized wings. Some of the regiments were raised during the colonial era.

== History ==
The Frontier Corps was created in 1907 by Lord Curzon, the viceroy of British India, in order to organise seven militia and scout units in the tribal areas along the border with Afghanistan: the Khyber Rifles, the Zhob Militia, the Kurram Militia, the Tochi Scouts, the Chagai Militia, the South Waziristan Scouts and the Chitral Scouts.

The Frontier Corps was led by an "inspecting officer" who was a British officer of the rank of lieutenant colonel. In 1943 the inspecting officer was upgraded to an inspector general (an officer with the rank of brigadier), and the corps was expanded with the addition of new units—the Second Mahsud Scouts (raised in 1944) and the Pishin Scouts (in 1946).

After Pakistan and India became independent in 1947, Pakistan expanded the corps further by creating a number of new units, including the Thal Scouts, the Northern Scouts, the Bajaur Scouts, the Karakoram Scouts, the Kalat Scouts, the Dir Scouts and the Kohistan Scouts. British officers continued to serve in the Frontier Corps up to the early 1950s. The corps was split into two major subdivisions with FC Balochistan incorporating the Zhob Militia, the Sibi Scouts, the Kalat Scouts, the Makran Militia, the Kharan Rifles, the Pishin Scouts, the Chaghai Militia and the First Mahsud Scouts.

In the mid-1970s, the Pakistani government used FC Balochistan to counter terrorism in Balochistan, and the force is unpopular among some of the local population who associate them with human rights violations and heavy-handed operations. To improve the image of the corps, it has been involved in the construction of schools and hospitals, although as of late 2004, corps installations in the province were being routinely attacked by terrorists.

In 2007, after the collapse of truce agreements between the Pakistani government and local militants, the Frontier Corps, teamed with regular Pakistani military units, conducted incursions into tribal areas controlled by the militants. The effort produced a series of bloody and clumsy confrontations. On 30 August 2007 about 250 troops, mostly from the Frontier Corps, surrendered to militants without a fight. In early November 2007, most were released in exchange for 25 militants held by the Pakistan Army.

There is a widespread consensus among United States government military and intelligence experts that the Frontier Corps are the best potential military units against the Islamist militants because its troops are locally recruited, know local languages and understand local cultures. The United States provided more than US$7 billion in military aid to Pakistan from 2002 to 2007, most of which was used to equip the Frontier Corps because it is in the front line of the fight against the Islamist insurgents. From late 2007, the Pakistani government intended to expand the corps to 100,000 and use it more in fighting Islamist militants, particularly Al-Qaeda, after extensive consultations with the U.S. government, with a multi-year plan to bolster the effort, including the establishment of a counterinsurgency training centre. The US Obama policy for Pakistan was seen as a clear victory for the Pakistan Army lobby in the US. The $1.5 billion a year unrestricted aid recently announced will go a long way in seeing that the Frontier Corps stay at the height of their professional abilities due to new equipment and training.

The Corps also fired occasionally on the U.S.-assisted Afghan Army.

== Role ==
- Border security duties.
- Assist Army/FCNA in the defense of the country as and when required.
- Protect important communication centers and routes.
- Undertake counter militancy/criminal/terrorism operations on orders.
- Assist law enforcement agencies in maintenance of law and order.
- Safeguard important sites and assets

During times of difficulties, the government occasionally gives the FC the power to arrest and detain suspects such as in late 2012 and early 2013 when the Prime Minister of Pakistan granted the FC policing powers. These temporary powers can also be extended on the orders or consent of the provincial government or federal government or both.

== Organisation ==
The Corps is led by an Inspector General, who is a seconded major general from the Pakistan Army. It has various supporting units

Inspector General, FC KPK South
Major General, Bilal Sarfaraz
Wings
| Frontier Corps Battle School, Khuzdar, Balochistan | 142 Special Operations Wing | Frontier Corps Intelligence Unit (South) | Dalbandin Rifles |
| Independent Armed Car Squadron | Awaran Militia (2006) | Chagai Militia | Dasht Scouts (2018) |
| Kalat Scouts (raised in 1965) | Mekran Scouts (1974) | Kharan Rifles (1965) | Nushki Militia (2002) |
| Panjgur Rifles (2005) | Taftan Rifles | Interior Ministry support | 50 Aviation Squadron |
Artillery Unit
Armoured Unit

== Equipment ==
=== Basic Equipment ===
- GIDS Ballistic Helmet
- Bullet Proof vests
- GIDS Knee pads

=== Small Arms ===
- VSK-100: The VSK 100 is essentially a Belarusian version of the AKM.
- QBZ-95: Used by the Special Operations Group (SOG) anti-terrorist unit
- H&K G3: POF Made G3 Battle Rifles
- AK-47: Multiple Variants in service
- MG3: POF Made MG1A3 variant in service
- PK-16: POF made Dshk heavy machine gun
- Type-85: Chinese 12.7mm HMG
- RPG-7: Rocket Propelled Grenade
- Type-79: Chinese variant of the Dragonuv Sniper rifle

=== Mortars and Artillery ===
- MO-120RT: 120mm Mortar
- LLR-81 Mortar: 81mm Mortar

=== Vehicles ===
- Toyota Land Cruiser Prado: VIP transport
- Toyota Hilux: Main Utility and troop/officer transport vehicle
- Land Rover Defender: Utility Vehicle
- Mitsubishi L-200: Utility Vehicle
- Hino Ranger: Troop/Supply transport

=== Armoured Vehicles ===
The Frontier Corps operates various HIT made armoured vehicles.

- Mohafiz: Unknown numbers in service.
- CSK-181: Unknown numbers in service
- Type-59 Tank: Type-59II variant in service. Handed over to Frontier Corps by Pakistan Army
- Type-69 Tank: Type-69IIMP Variant in service. Also handed over by Pakistan army.
- T-55M: Modernised T-55 MBT. Number of Ex-Serbian units procured in 2020.

=== Aircraft ===
The Corps has access to the aviation resources of the Pakistan Army.

== Inspectors general ==
The Corps was divided into FC NWFP and FC Balochistan in 1974. The inspectors general listed below are from 1974 to 2017. For previous inspectors general, see the Frontier Corps article.

1. Maj. Gen. Rehmat Ali Shah (Mar. 1974 to Dec. 1976)
2. Brig. Shakur Jan, SJ (Fen 1977 to Jul 1978)
3. Maj. Gen. Alam Jan Mehsud (Jul 1978 to Jun 1980)
4. Maj. Gen. Khurshid Ali (Jun 1980 to Feb 1984)
5. Maj. Gen. M. Akram (Feb 1984 to Nov 1984)
6. Maj. Gen. Shafiq Ahmed, SJ (Nov 1984 to Apr 1985)
7. Maj. Gen. Sardar M. Khalid (May 1985 to Oct 1990)
8. Maj. Gen. Chaudhry M. Nawaz (Nov 1990 to Oct 1991)
9. Maj. Gen. Syed Zafar Mehdi (Oct 1991 to Nov 1993)
10. Maj. Gen. M. Zia-ul-Haq (Nov 1993 to Oct 1997)
11. Maj. Gen. Rafiullah Khan Niazi (Oct 1997 to Oct 1999)
12. Maj. Gen. M. Ziaullah Khan (Nov 1999 to Oct 2001)
13. Maj. Gen. Syed Sadaqat Ali Shah (Oct 2001 to Oct 2004)
14. Maj. Gen. Shujaat Zamir Dar (Oct 2004 to Feb 2007)
15. Brig. Khalid Mukhtar Farani ( A /IGFC 2006 due to injury of IG and DIG )
16. Maj. Gen. Salim Nawaz (Mar 2007 to Oct 2010)
17. Maj. Gen. Ubaid Ullah Khan Khattak (Oct 2010 to Aug 2013)
18. Maj. Gen. Ejaz Shahid (Aug 2013 to Feb 2015)
19. Maj. Gen. Sher Afghun (Feb 2015 to Dec 2016)
20. Maj. Gen. Nadeem Anjum (Dec 2016- Dec 2018)

In 2017 FC Balochistan was split into FC Balochistan (North) and FC Balochistan (South).

1. Maj. Gen. Saeed Ahmed Nagra (2017-2018)
2. Maj. Gen. Sardar Tariq Aman (2018 - Jan 2020)
3. Maj. Gen. Sarfaraz Ali (Jan 2020 - Dec 2020)
4. Maj. Gen. Ayman Bilal Safdar (Dec 2020 - Oct 2021)
5. Maj. Gen. Kamal Anwar Chaudhry (Oct 2021-Sept 2023)
6. Maj. Gen. Kamran Ahmad (Sept 2023—Sept 2024)
7. Maj. Gen. Bilal Sarfaraz (September 2024—September 2026)
8. Maj. Gen. Zafar Iqbal (September 2024—Present)

== Schools and colleges ==
Most of the FC educational institutes are affiliated with Federal board rather than provincial boards in Balochistan.

- Lieutenant Safiullah Shaheed FC school, Nushki. (Chaghai Militia)

== See also ==
- Law enforcement in Pakistan
- Civil Armed Forces
- Insurgency in Balochistan
