= Balochistan Levies =

Paramilitary gendarmerie in Balochistan, Pakistan

Balochistan Levies لعویوں بلوچستان
- Logo of the Balochistan Levies

Agency overview
- Formed: 1859
- Dissolved: Oct 2025
- Superseding agency: Balochistan Police
- Employees: 23,132 personnel (2018)

Jurisdictional structure
- Operations jurisdiction: Pakistan
- General nature: Gendarmerie

Operational structure
- Agency executive: Abdul Ghaffar Magsi, Director general

Website
- https://balochistanleviesforce.gob.pk/

Balochistan Levies (لعویوں بلوچستان) was a paramilitary gendarmerie in the Pakistani province of Balochistan. It operated as one of two primary law enforcement agencies tasked with maintaining law and order in the province, along with Balochistan Police. The levies force had jurisdiction in most districts of Balochistan.

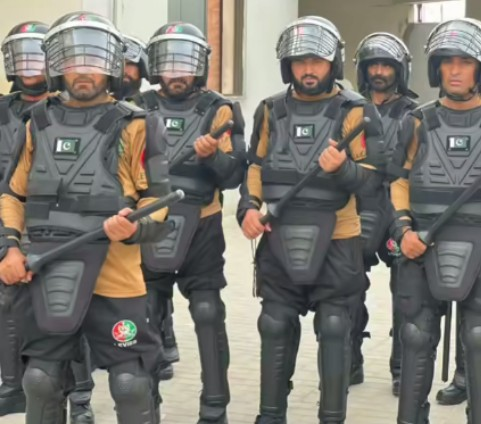
Balochistan Levies personnel in full armor, without firearms

== History ==
The force has its origins back in the days of the British Raj, and has continued to function for over a century. It is headed by a director-general and is mostly constituted by local security personnel, including Baloch and Pashtun officers. During the regime of Pervez Musharraf, the Balochistan Levies had been disbanded and merged into the provincial police force. It was restored in 2010.

In October 2025, the Levies Force was formally merged into the Balochistan Police in six of the province’s seven administrative divisions (Quetta, Kalat, Makran, Zhob, Rakhshan and Nasirabad) following a provincial cabinet decision, with all Levies personnel, infrastructure and assets in those “A-areas” now placed under police jurisdiction.

== Operations ==
Areas which are manned by and are under the control of the Levies are called "B-Areas" which constitute around 90% of the total area of Balochistan while those under the control of the Balochistan Police are dubbed "A-Areas" i.e. around 10%. The levies have been praised for their efficiency and reliability compared to the police force; this is attributed to the fact that it predominantly consists of local officers who are familiar with and well accustomed to the political and law and order landscape of Balochistan, thus fulfilling the concept of community policing, whereas the police force predominantly consists of non-locals. It is also in charge of more areas as compared to the police, and yet has a lower budget, rendering it the "cheapest available law enforcement agency". However, many critics have contended that the force has been used by Baloch tribal chiefs to serve their own interests. The force has often been targeted by militants involved in the insurgency in Balochistan.

In 2018 the Balochistan government embarked on a four year long levies reorganization to improve the force "to turn it into a professional and motivated law-enforcement agency."

== Law enforcement in Balochistan ==
Balochistan Police is responsible for the law and order situation in mostly urban areas only, which are called A areas. This division has been in place, in various forms, since the time of the British Raj. Balochistan's rural areas, called B areas, are policed by the Balochistan Levies. The Frontier Corps operates in both areas. This division is seen as a severe handicap by the police and Levies as criminals based outside their areas of jurisdiction can easily plan attacks and run away.

The distinction was eliminated by Musharraf, however, it was brought back by the PPP government of 2008 under the Chief Minister of Balochistan Aslam Raisani. The frequent swings in policy obviously do not allow institution-building and hurt the agencies' abilities to deal with crime.

Since the September 11 terrorist attacks and the War in Afghanistan (2001-2021) targeted killings, kidnappings, and terrorist attacks have risen substantially. In 2013 there were several bombings targeting the Hazara community in Quetta. and attacks on police including senior officials.

== Duties ==
Balochistan Levies duties include but are not limited to the following:

- Maintenance of law and order which includes patrolling and highway patrol,
- Execution and service of judicial summons and warrants and manning jails.
- Protection of vital installations, railways tracks, bridges and culverts, buildings and railways.
- Security of foreign missions and delegations.
- Maintenance of law and order in Afghan refugees camps.
- natural disaster response and relief.
- Assist other agencies in the prevention of smuggling.
- helps protect the Pakistan – Afghanistan border.
- Collection of land revenue, usher, agriculture taxes, and all kinds of loans including Bank Loans.

== Organization ==
The Balochistan Levies, covering 90% areas of Balochistan, is headed by the Director General (DG) Levies Force who is assisted by three Directors; Operations, Administration, and Intelligence & Investigations.

The current DG proposed to establish new wings for counter-terrorism, digital communication, China-Pakistan Economic Corridor security, intelligence and investigation, plus establish a quick response force and bomb disposal squad(s). He also wants to expand the Levies by another 2000 members.

There are currently six Levy Zones each Headed by a Director who controls three or more District Area of Operations:

1. Quetta, covering Pishin, Killah Abdullah, and Ziarat districts
2. Zhob (Hqs Loralai), covering Zhob, Loralai, Barkhan, Musakhel, Killa Saifullah, and Kohlu districts
3. Sibi (Hqs Sibi), covering Sibi, Kachhi (Bolan), Jhal Magsi, and Dera Bugti districts
4. Kalat(Hqs Khuzdar), covering Khuzdar, Kalat, and Awaram districts
5. Chagai (Hqs Mastung), covering Chagai, Mastung, Kharan, and Nushki districts
6. Mekran (Hqs Turbat), covering Kech, Panjgur, and Gwadar (see note) districts

Note: Gwadar is to be redesignated an "A-Area" and thus be turned over to the Balochistan Police. thereby reducing the covered districts from 23 to 22, out of 30 total.

== Directors-General ==
- Director General, Abdul Ghaffar Magsi (BSS-19)

== See also ==
- Law enforcement in Pakistan
- Pakistan Levies
