= 142 Special Operations Wing =

Pakistani paramilitary unit

- Founded: 2007
- Country: Pakistan
- Branch: Civil Armed Forces
- Type: Special forces
- Role: Special operations Counter-terrorism
- Part of: Frontier Corps Balochistan (South)
- Engagements: Insurgency in Balochistan

142 Special Operations Wing is a paramilitary special forces unit of the Frontier Corps Balochistan (South) in Pakistan.

Information about the unit is generally classified, and the unit is rarely mentioned by officials. There was a brief mention in June 2017 when the unit participated in a raid on a suspected militant base in Mastung, Balochistan. It was also the subject of some media attention in January 2018 when a cadre of new recruits completed their training at Khuzdar. The passing out ceremony was attended by a very senior Army general, Asim Saleem Bajwa, who was the military commander for the southwest of Pakistan at the time.

The unit has been involved in anti-drugs operations. In 2011-2012, it received a number of drug-testing kits, through a United Nations programme, to assist in their work against drug smuggling.

== See also ==
- List of military special forces units
