= 34th Light Infantry Division =

34th Light Infantry Division (SSD)
- Special Security Division (SSD)
- Active: September 2016
- Country: Pakistan
- Branch: Pakistan Army
- Type: Light infantry
- Role: Infrastructure security
- Size: 15,000 personnel
- Part of: [CGS]
- HQ: Chilas

Commanders
- General Officer Commanding: Major-General Amjad Aziz Mughal
- Former commander: Major-General Kamran Nazir Malik HI(M)

The 34th Light Infantry Division, also known as Special Security Division (SSD), is a 2-star Pakistan Army formation, raised in September 2016 as a response to major concerns over how to protect the China-Pakistan Economic Corridor (CPEC) and its workforce from serious internal and external threats.

== Organization ==
34th Light Infantry Division (SSD) consists of 15,000 personnel organised into nine army infantry battalions and six paramilitary wings (from the Pakistan Rangers and the Frontier Corps), the latter funded by the Interior Ministry.

The SSD is the land-based counterpart to CPEC's maritime security command, Task-Force 88, raised in December 2016, and led by the Pakistan Navy, including personnel from the Pakistan Marines and the Maritime Security Agency.

== Commanders ==
In 2016, SSD was formed and stationed at Chilas. Later it was renamed as 34th Light Infantry Division. And finally it is renamed into Special Security Division (SSD).

First GOC was appointed in September 2016.

- Maj Gen Abid Rafique (September 2016 - April 2017)
- Maj Gen (Now Lt Gen) Ahsan Gulrez (April 2017 - October 2018)
- Maj Gen Ghulam Jafar (October 2018 - February 2020)
- Maj Gen Kamran Nazir Malik (December 2020 - December 2022)
- Maj Gen Muhammad Abbas (December 2022- December 2024)
- Maj Gen Amjad Aziz Mughal (December 2024- to date)

== See also ==
- X Corps (Pakistan)
- XI Corps (Pakistan)
- China–Pakistan relations
