= Gilgit-Baltistan Scouts =

Pakistani border security and paramilitary force

Gilgit Baltistan Scouts گلگت بلتستان اسکاؤٹس
- Logo of the Gilgit−Baltistan Scouts

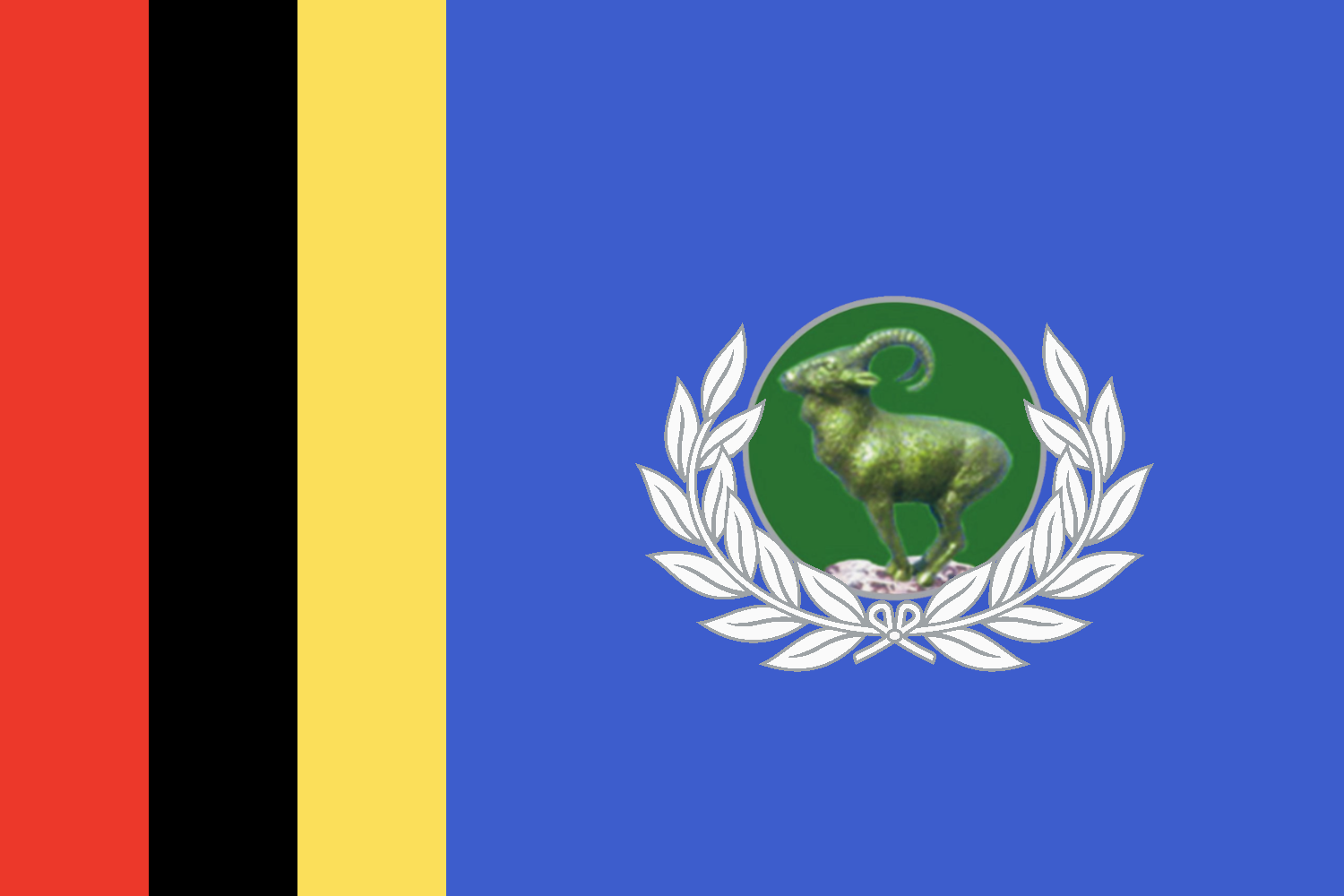
- Flag of the Gilgit−Baltistan Scouts
- Common name: GB Scouts
- Motto: شمال کے محافظ; Defenders of the North

Agency overview
- Formed: 2003; 23 years ago
- Preceding agencies: Northern Light Infantry; Gilgit Scouts
- Annual budget: Rs. 2.1 billion (2020)

Jurisdictional structure
- Federal agency: Pakistan
- Operations jurisdiction: Gilgit-Baltistan, Pakistan
- Governing body: Ministry of the Interior
- General nature: Federal law enforcement
- Specialist jurisdictions: Paramilitary law enforcement, counter insurgency, riot control; National border patrol, security, integrity

Operational structure
- Overseen by: Pakistan Army
- Headquarters: Gilgit, Gilgit-Baltistan
- Elected officer responsible: Mohsin Raza Naqvi, Minister of Interior
- Agency executive: Director General, Brig Yasir Javed Khan
- Parent agency: Civil Armed Forces

Website
- www.gilgitbaltistanscouts.gov.pk

The Gilgit−Baltistan Scouts (GBS) is a federal paramilitary force in Pakistan tasked with border and internal security in the nominally extreme northern mountainous autonomous territory of Gilgit-Baltistan. The GBS was formed in 2003 under the control of the Interior Ministry of Pakistan, but it claims a tradition dating back to the Gilgit Scouts formed during the British Raj era. However, the earlier Scouts unit is now a full infantry regiment of the Pakistan Army called the Northern Light Infantry Regiment, which mostly operates in the same region as the current Scouts.

== Formation ==
Gilgit Scouts

The original Gilgit Scouts was raised by the British Raj in 1913 to defend the princely state of Jammu and Kashmir's northern frontier. In August 1947, the Scouts along with rebels in the Jammu and Kashmir State Forces, switched allegiance to Pakistan and fought on the northern front of the Indo-Pakistani War of 1947–1948, conquering important places such as Skardu, Kargil and Drass (the latter two were subsequently recaptured by the Indian Army). In 1949, the Gilgit Scouts were split into two forces, with the wing under the original name 'Gilgit Scouts' designated for internal security operations, and a second wing, named the 'Northern Scouts', designated for major external operations. In 1964, the Northern Scouts were further bifurcated with the raising of the 'Karakoram Scouts' based in Skardu. All three forces were brought together again in 1975, under the banner of the Northern Light Infantry (then a paramilitary force). Following the 1999 Kargil War with India, where the Northern Light Infantry saw extensive combat, the force was converted into a regular regiment of the Pakistan Army. The present force of Gilgit-Baltistan Scouts was created in 2003 to fill the internal security role previously carried out by the Northern Light Infantry.

== Units ==
The force is composed of a headquarters, a training centre and six manoeuvre wings (each approximately the size of a battalion). About 40 platoons have been tasked with law enforcement within Gilgit-Baltistan, including seizure of unauthorised weapons. The Scouts went through an expansion phase in 2014, with more than 1,500 new personnel being recruited to help with law enforcement on critical infrastructure projects such as the Karakoram Highway. A sixth wing was also added, charged with protecting the building of the Diamer-Bhasha Dam

- HQ Wing at Gilgit
- 112 Wing serving on the Line of Control under 323rd Brigade of the Pakistan Army.
- 113 Wing at Skardu
- 114 Wing at Siachen
- 115 Wing at Chilas
- 116 Wing at Ghanche
- 117 Wing at Ghizer

Flag Variant of The Gilgit Baltistan Scouts

Interior Ministry support

- 50 Aviation Squadron

=== Ranks ===
Rank group	General / flag officers	Senior officers			Junior officers
Gilgit−Baltistan Scouts
Gilgit−Baltistan Scouts	Brigadier بریگیڈیئر	Colonel کرنل	Lieutenant colonel لیفٹیننٹ کرنل	Major میجر	Captain کیپٹن	Lieutenant لیفٹنینٹ	Second lieutenant سیکنڈ لیفٹیننٹ

Rank group	Junior commissioned officers			Non commissioned officer	Enlisted
Gilgit−Baltistan Scouts							No insignia
Gilgit−Baltistan Scouts	Subedar-Major صوبیدار میجر	Subedar صوبیدار	Naib Subedar نائب صوبیدار	Havildar حوالدار۔	Naik نائیک۔	Lance Naik لانس نائیک۔	Sepoy سپاہی۔

== Standard equipment ==
- Automatic Rifles – 7.62 mm Heckler & Koch G3, 7.62 mm Type 56 (POF made)
- Sub-Machine Guns – 9 mm Heckler & Koch MP5
- Pistols – Glock series, Sigma series
- Sniper Rifles – POF PSR-90, Steyr SSG 69
- Hand Grenades – ARGES 84 (POF made)
- Anti-tank Weapons – RPG-7 (Rocket Launcher), M40A1 (Recoilless Rifle)
- Machine Gun – 7.62 mm Rheinmetall MG3 (POF made)
- Heavy Machine Gun – 12.7mm Type 54 (POF made)
- Mortars – Various locally produced in use
- Bullet Proof Jackets – Various local and foreign types
- Helmets – Modular Integrated Communications Helmet and indigenous helmets locally produced
- Night-vision device
- Utility Vehicles – HIT Mohafiz, Indus Hilux locally produced
- Helicopters – Bell 206, Bell 412

== Appearance ==
The formal headwear of the scouts are somewhat similar to the ones worn by the Pakistan Rangers (Punjab).

== Operations and Internal Security ==
The Force has been performing both operational and Internal Security tasks since its raising. The Special Composite Task Force formed for the protection of Karakoram Highway is commanded by the Gilgit−Baltistan Scouts. The Force also took part in recent operations in Waziristan.

== Director Generals ==
- Brigadier Inayat Wali (2004–2005)
- Brigadier Tassaduq Hussain Zahid (2005–2007)
- Brigadier Azmat Ali (2007–2009)
- Brigadier Nadeem Ul Ahsan Tirmizi (2009–2012)
- Brigadier Babar Allauddin (2012–2014)
- Brigadier Farooq Azam (2014–2016)
- Brigadier Ijaz Ur Rehman Tanveer (2016 - 2017)
- Brigadier Abrar Ahmed (2017 - 2019)
- Brigadier Zia Ur Rehman (2019 - 2022)
- Brigadier Arslan Israr Mirza (2022 - to date)

== See also ==
- Civil Armed Forces
- Law enforcement in Pakistan
- Northern Light Infantry Regiment
- Gilgit Scouts
- Ladakh Scouts
- Gilgit-Baltistan Levies Force
