= Kharan Rifles =

- Country: Pakistan
- Branch: Civil Armed Forces
- Role: Paramilitary police
- Size: 5 battalion-sized Wings
- Part of: Frontier Corps
- Garrison/HQ: Nok Kundi

Commanders
- Current commander: Colonel Qamar Zaheer
- Previous commanders: Colonel Pir Sadiq Shah; Colonel Sadiq Ali Shah

The Kharan Rifles is a paramilitary regiment forming part of the Pakistani Frontier Corps Balochistan (South). It is responsible for border security, counter-insurgency, and maintaining law and order in southwest Pakistan. It guards the border area at the junction of Pakistan, Iran and Afghanistan, a major transit area for trade and traffic. The regiment which is commanded by seconded officers of the Pakistan Army is administratively under the Interior Ministry.

== History ==
In 1978, the Balochistan Constabulary, a paramilitary unit based in the Khuzdar, Kharan and Washuk Districts in Balochistan Province, was deactivated, raised anew as a unit of the Frontier Corps and joined by the 84th Wing of the Chagai Militia. The new name of the unit was the Kharan Rifles and their base was moved from the large city of Khuzdar to the remote settlement of Nok Kundi. The Rifles were subdivided into three battalions: the 75th Wing, the 76th Wing, and the 84th Wing. By 1985 the Rifles had a strength of 2,200 personnel, but it remained a lightly armed unit.

In 1988, personnel of the Rifles discovered and neutralised several explosive devices on the main highway linking the Iranian city of Zahedan and Pakistani city of Quetta. In September 1999, one person died and three were injured in a confrontation with armed personnel based in Taftan.

In the early 21st century, the Rifles apprehended significant amounts of smuggled weapons and ammunition near the Pakistan-Afghanistan border in Chagai District including on 11 July 2002, and 16 March 2006.

The Rifles have also been in anti-drugs operations. In June 2002, the unit intercepted smugglers and seized two tonnes of heroin, with an estimated street value of $13 million. In 2011-2012, the unit received a number of drug testing kits to assist in their work against drug smuggling.

== Units ==
- Headquarters Wing
- 60 Wing
- 75 Wing
- 76 Wing
- 84 Wing
- 145 Wing
