= Pakistan Levies =

Pakistani provincial paramilitary forces

The Pakistan Levies (Urdu: پاکستان لیویز, romanized: Pakistan Liyuz), or Federal Levies, are provincial paramilitary forces (gendarmeries) in Pakistan, whose primary missions are law enforcement, assisting the civilian police (where co-located) in maintaining law and order, and conducting internal security operations at the provincial level. The various Levies Forces operate under separate chains of command and wear distinct patches and badges.

== About ==
Levies are locally recruited paramilitary forces (gendarmeries) responsible for security and law enforcement in Pakistan's tribal areas. Historically, they were federally funded and governed by the Federal Levies Force (Service) Rules of 2012 and the subsequent amendments in 2013.

Following the 2018 merger of the Federally Administered Tribal Areas (FATA) and Provincially Administered Tribal Areas (PATA) into their respective provincial administrations, the governance of Levies forces has transitioned. As of 2024, all Levies forces fall under the control of their respective provincial governments and are guided by acts passed by the provincial assemblies.

== Organization ==
Levies forces typically follow a hierarchical command structure with a Commandant at the helm. Here's a breakdown of the key positions:

Commandant: This position is usually held by the Political Agent of the Agency in Federally Administered Tribal Areas or the District Coordination Officer (for local Frontier Regions). The Commandant is responsible for the overall leadership and operations of the Levies force within their jurisdiction.

- Deputy Commandants: Two Deputy Commandants assist the Commandant:
  - Deputy Commandant (Operations): Appointed by the Provincial Government, this officer can be an Assistant Political Agent, an officer of the agency or Frontier Region, or any designated district officer. They are responsible for overseeing operational matters within their specific jurisdiction.
  - Deputy Commandant (Administration): This position can be filled by an officer from the Federal or Provincial civil service or a designated district officer. They handle administrative and establishment matters of the Levies force and report directly to the Commandant.

Director-General (Federal Levies): Historically, a Director-General appointed by the Federal Government exercised oversight over the federal Levies force. However, with the transfer of Levies to provincial control, the role of the Director-General has been redefined or eliminated depending on the specific provincial structure.

== Forces ==
=== Balochistan ===
The Balochistan Levies operate in the Pakistani province of Balochistan where it serves as one of two primary law enforcement agencies tasked with maintaining law and order in the province. The levies force has jurisdiction in most districts of Balochistan. The force has approximately 23,132 personnel in 2018 and traces its origins back to the days of the British Raj, and has continued to function for over a century. It is headed by a director-general and is mostly constituted by local security personnel, including Baloch and Pashtun officers. During the regime of Pervez Musharraf, the Balochistan Levies had been disbanded and merged into the provincial police force. It was restored in 2010.

Areas which are manned by and are under the control of the Levies are called "B-Areas" which constitute around 90% of the total area of Balochistan while those under the control of the Balochistan Police are dubbed "A-Areas" i.e around 10%. The levies have been praised for their efficiency and reliability compared to the police force; this is attributed to the fact that it predominantly consists of local officers who are familiar with and well accustomed to the political and law and order landscape of Balochistan, thus fulfilling the concept of community policing, whereas the police force predominantly consists of non-locals. It is also in charge of more areas as compared to the police, and yet has a lower budget, rendering it the "cheapest available law enforcement agency". However, many critics have contended that the force has been used by Baloch tribal chiefs to serve their own interests. The force has often been targeted by militants involved in the insurgency in Balochistan.

=== Khyber Pakhtunkhwa ===
The Levies in Khyber Pakhtunkhwa operate between the former Federally Administered Tribal Areas (FATA), the Provincially Administered Tribal Areas (PATA), and settled areas in Khyber Pakhtunkhwa known as the Frontier Regions (FR). Different from the khasadars, often referred to as tribal police who are appointed by tribal authorities, the Levies are appointed by the political administration on merit basis and are given arms and ammunition by the government. The 2018 sanctioned strength of KP levies was 11,739 personnel. The various Levies in KP report to Secretary Home and Tribal Affairs of KP. The Levies in Khyber Paktunkwa are covered under the Provincially Administered Tribal Areas Levies Force Regulation, 2012

- Malakand Levies, operates in Malakand Division
- Dir Levies (not be confused with the Dir Scouts which is part of the Frontier Corps).

Note that the federal levies and Khasadar in KPK now fall under the Khyber Pakhtunkhwa Police.

=== Gilgit-Baltistan ===
==== Gilgit Baltistan Levies Force ====
The Pakistani-administered region of Gilgit-Baltistan has also set up a similar unit called the Gilgit-Baltistan Levies Force. The most recent rules for the force were issued on 27 March 2017.

=== Punjab ===
==== Border Military Police ====
The Border Military Police (BMP) is a levies force established under the Punjab Border Military Police Act, 1904. It's responsible for maintaining security in the notified tribal areas of Dera Ghazi Khan and Rajanpur districts of Punjab, Pakistan. It operates under the provincial Home department.

The Act defines the powers and duties of the BMP personnel. It also outlines procedures for disciplinary actions and the conditions of service for BMP members. It also covers resignation, court jurisdiction and application of the Act on former Baluch Levy.

== Recruitment ==
The Levies is a standing force consisting of locally recruited personnel who must undertake a six month basic training course which covers "basic laws, investigation techniques, crowd control, basic intelligence, arrest and detention procedure, jail duties, drill, weapons training, field craft, bomb disposal, counter assault, traffic control, raids, watch & ward etc."

== Uniforms ==
The Federal Levies Force (Amended) Service Rules, 2013, mandate a specific uniform for the federal Levies under their jurisdiction. This uniform consists of a black shalwar kameez, brown chappals (sandals), white socks, a black beret cap and a black belt. Junior commissioned officers (JCOs) wear a brown belt during duty hours.

This dress code applies specifically to the federal Levies. Levies forces under the control of individual provinces have their own designated uniforms defined by separate provincial regulations.

== See also ==
- Law enforcement in Pakistan
- Civil Armed Forces
- Federal Constabulary
- National Guard (Pakistan)
- Levy (disambiguation)
