= Balochistan Police =

Police force in Balochistan, Pakistan

Balochistan Police بلوچستان پولیس
- Abbreviation: B.P
- Motto: امرُ بِالمعرُوف و نھی عِن المنکر (Arabic) نیکی کا حکم دو اور برائی سے روکو (Urdu) (Enjoining good and forbidding wrong)

Agency overview
- Formed: 1970; 56 years ago
- Employees: 42,770
- Annual budget: Classified

Jurisdictional structure
- Operations jurisdiction: Pakistan
- Map of Balochistan Police's jurisdiction
- Area: 347,200 square kilometres (134,100 sq mi)
- Population: 23,000,000
- Legal jurisdiction: Balochistan, Pakistan
- Governing body: Government of Balochistan, Pakistan; Government of Pakistan
- Constituting instrument: Balochistan Police Act 2011

Operational structure
- Headquarters: Quetta, Balochistan, Pakistan
- Agency executive: Muhammad Tahir PSP, Inspector General of Police 2. Khwaja Masrur Husain
- Parent agency: Police Service of Pakistan

Website
- http://www.balochistanpolice.gov.pk/

Balochistan Police or Baloch Police (Balochi and Urdu: بلوچستان پولیس) is responsible for policing urban Balochistan, Pakistan. Its strength is 42,770 as of 2023. The current Inspector General of Balochistan Police is Muhammad Tahir.

== Law enforcement in Balochistan ==
Service colour	Dark blue and red
Uniform colour	Black, Khaki

Balochistan Police is responsible for the law and order situation in mostly urban areas of the province only, which are called A areas. This division has been in place, in various forms, since the time of the British Raj. Balochistan's rural areas, called B areas, are policed by the Balochistan Levies. The Frontier Corps operates in both areas. This division is seen as a severe handicap by the police as criminals based outside their limited area of jurisdiction can easily plan attacks and run away.

The distinction was eliminated by Pervez Musharraf, however, it was brought back by the PPP government of 2008 under CM Balochistan Aslam Raisani. The frequent swings in policy obviously do not allow institution-building and hurt the agencies' abilities to deal with crime.

Since Pakistan's post 9/11 involvement in the war on terrorism targeted killings, kidnappings, and terrorist attacks have risen substantially. In 2013 there were several bombings targeting the Hazara community in Quetta and attacks on police including senior officials.

== 2008 - 2013 ==
PPP formed a government in Balochistan and ruled in a coalition with Nawab Aslam Raisani as Chief Minister. Aslam Raisana chose Humayan Joegazai as CCPO Quetta, who was known to have close links with lashkar-e-Jhangvi. During the start of his career, he ordered policemen to fire live rounds at Hazara protesters. 25 innocent civilians were killed. He was brought back to Quetta by Raisani and during his tenure, things once again took a turn for the worse, particularly for the Hazara community.

== Improvement in 2014 ==
The number of terrorist attacks dropped from 205 in 2013 to 154 in 2014 (a 25 percent decline) and the number of people killed in terrorist attacks fell from around 350 in 2013 to 48 in 2014 (an 86 percent decline).

== Levies Merger ==
The Government of Balochistan has once again abolished the Balochistan Levies Force merging it into the Balochistan Police to "strengthen institutional structure, reduce duplication, and ensure better governance in remote and conflict-prone districts".

== Organization ==
- Balochistan Constabulary, a reserve police unit of Balochistan police consisting of more than 10,000 personnel located in the districts of Kharan and Khuzdar, was converted to a unit of Frontier Corps (Balochistan) and named the Kharan Rifles. It was organized at Khuzdar and then moved its HQ to Nokkundi in 1978. The personnel of the constabulary units were then organized as 75 Wing and 76 Wing, while 84 Wing of Chagai Militia was detached from that unit and placed under a command given the name "Kharan Rifles".

== Designations ==
Designations of Balochistan Police are as follow:

Grade	Police Ranks	Abbreviations
BPS-05	Constable	PC
BPS-07	Head Constable	HC
BPS-09	Assistant Sub-Inspector	ASI
BPS-14	Sub-Inspector	SI
BPS-16	Police Inspector	Inspector
BPS-17	Assistant Superintendent of Police; Deputy Superintendent of Police	ASP; DSP
BPS-18	Superintendent of Police	SP
BPS-19	Senior Superintendent of Police/Assistant Inspector General	SSP/AIG
BPS-20	Deputy Inspector General	DIG
BPS-21	Additional Inspector General	Addl. IG
BPS-22	Inspector General of Police	IGP

=== Posts ===
SHO, SDPO, DPO, CCPO, RPO and PPO are posts, not ranks. So you may see a lower rank acting at a higher post for some time.

== IGPs of Balochistan Police ==
	Name	From-date	To-date
34	Muhammad Tahir	8 September 2025	Present
33	Moazzam Jah Ansari	28 August 2024	07-09-2025
32	Abdul Khaliq Shaikh	02-06-2022	28-08-2024
31	Mohsin Hassan Butt	01.03.2022	02-06-2022
30	Muhammad Tahir Rai	23-1-2021	23-02-2022
29	Mohsin Hassan Butt	13-7-2018	22-1-2021
28	Mr. Moazzam Jah Ansari	18-10-2017	12-7-2018
27	Mr. Ahsan Mehboob	02-11-2015	30-09-2017
26	Mr. Muhammad Amlish	17-06-2014	02-09-2015
25	Mr. Mushtaq Ahmad Sukhera	25-02-2013	16-06-2014
24	Mr. Tarik Umar Khitab	15-06-2012	23-02-2013
23	Rao Amin Hashim	18-05-2011	10-05-2012
22	Mr. Malik Muhammad Iqbal	13-07-2010	06-04-2011
21	Syed Jawed Ali Shah Bukhari	06-08-2009	13-07-2010
20	Mr. Asif Nawaz	09-08-2008	02-07-2009
19	Mr. Saud Gohar	04-11-2007	09-08-2008
18	Mr. Tariq Mehmood Khosa	18-01-2007	03-11-2007
17	Ch. Muhammad Yaqoob	30-05-2004	31-12-2006
16	Dr. Muhammad Shoaib Suddle	19-09-2001	30-05-2004
15	Syed Kamal Shah	24-07-2000	16-09-2001
14	Mr. Abdul Qadir Hayee	28-11-1999	24-07-2000
13	Mr. Muhammad Habib Khan	30-11-1998	27-11-1999
12	Mr. Asif Ali Shah	29-04-1997	30-11-1998
11	Mr. Javaid Qayum Khan	31-10-1995	29-04-1997
10	Mr. Faqir Zia Masoom	25-07-1993	31-10-1995
9	Mr. Gohar Zaman	06-08-1992	25-07-1993
8	Mr. Muhammad Aziz Khan	13-02-1991	05-08-1992
7	Mr. Kamar Alam	30-09-1984	03-02-1991
6	Syed Saadat Ali Shah	04-09-1982	11-08-1984
5	Dr. Dilshad Najmuddin	05-07-1977	28-08-1982
4	Comdr. M.A.R. Arif	26-09-1974	04-07-1977
3	Mr. Muhammad Nawaz Khan	13-03-1973	12-04-1974
2	Mr. Masroor Hassan	07-02-1972	25-05-1972
1	Ch. Fazal-E-Haq	01-07-1970	17-01-1972

== See also ==
- Frontier Corps, the paramilitary law enforcement wing in Balochistan
- Law enforcement in Pakistan
- Khyber Pakhtunkhwa Police
- Punjab Police
- Sindh Police
