= Taftan Rifles =

Pakistani paramilitary unit

- Founded: 1977
- Country: Pakistan
- Branch: Civil Armed Forces
- Type: Paramilitary
- Role: Light infantry
- Size: 7 Wings
- Part of: Frontier Corps Balochistan (South)
- Regimental centre: Nok Kundi

Commanders
- Current commander: Colonel Abdul Majeed

The Taftan Rifles is a paramilitary regiment forming part of the Frontier Corps Balochistan (South) of Pakistan. It is named after the border town of Taftan, Balochistan. The regiment is tasked with defending part of the border with Afghanistan and Iran, and assisting with law enforcement in the districts adjacent to the border. This includes countering drug smuggling operations from the Golden Crescent, with several significant seizures such as in May 2019, October 2019, and May 2021.

The regiment had a 2020/21 budget of Rs. 1.88 billion and is currently composed of a headquarters wing and seven battalion-sized manoeuvre wings. The Rifles have undergone an expansion in recent years with more than 1,700 recruits being successfully trained over a two-year period covering 2021 and 2022.

== Units ==
- Headquarters Wing
- 73 Wing
- 75 Wing
- 105 Wing
- 109 Wing
- 148 Wing
- 167 Wing
- 170 Wing
