= Bajaur Scouts =

Pakistani paramilitary unit

- Founded: 1 April 1961 (65 years, 6 months)
- Country: Pakistan
- Allegiance: Ministry of Interior
- Branch: Frontier Corps Khyber Pakhtunkhwa (North)
- Type: Paramilitary unit
- Role: Border patrol Counterterrorism; Counterinsurgency; Special operations
- Size: 7 Wings
- Part of: Civil Armed Forces
- Regimental centre: Khar, Bajaur
- Mottos: تیار و وفادار; Ready and Loyal

Commanders
- Commandant: Colonel Waqas Shoaib Jan

Insignia
- War Flag

The Bajaur Scouts is a paramilitary regiment of the Frontier Corps Khyber Pakhtunkhwa (North) of Pakistan, recruited locally in Bajaur District and officered by regular Pakistan Army officers. The Scouts were previously the Bajaur Levies, and served in the Bajaur, Swat, and Dir tribal areas. The force was formed in April 1961 from several units of the Khyber Rifles and Chitral Scouts. In the early 21st century, the Scouts have been involved in anti-drugs operations. In 2011-2012, the unit received a number of drug testing kits to assist in their work against drug smuggling.

== History ==
=== Battle of Bajaur (Operation Sherdil 2008) ===
Bajaur Scouts along with other troops of from Frontier Corps launched Operation Sherdil on 7 August 2008 with a support from Infantry Brigade of Pakistan army under the command of its then Commandant Colonel Nauman Saeed. The operation was primarily launched to end the political movement of the Tehrik-e-Taliban Pakistan in Bajaur. Bajaur area was administered by Tehrik-e-Taliban Pakistan from 2002 to 2007, and it remained Al-Qaeda's central command and control for carrying out activities in Northeast Afghanistan and Kunar province after the US invasion of Afghanistan. Resultantly, Pakistan launched Operation Sherdil to clear militants from Bajaur in 2008. The Operation Sherdil witnessed the valour of Bajaur Scouts and its Commandant Nauman Saeed during this operation when Scouts under the command of Colonel Nauman rescued the convoy of Inspector-General Frontier Corps Major-General Tariq Khan who was ambushed on 9 September 2009 at Nissarabad. Col. Nauman went back to the ambush site with a tank and a Quick Response Force to extricate the crew of a vehicle that was disabled by the militants fire. His tank received multiple hits by RPG-7s and his operator suffered a bullet injury. However, they extracted the stranded vehicle along with the soldiers. He was awarded by the government for his contribution to the operation. The operation resulted in decisive victory for Pakistan in which around 1800 militans were killed and area was cleaned-off from the militants.

== Role ==
The Bajaur Scouts serves as the first line of defence as force is responsible for the patrolling of Bajaur portion of Afghanistan-Pakistan border that cuts through Bajaur district on Pakistani side whereas Kunar province on Afghanistan side. Additionally, the Bajaur Scouts provides security to the key installations located across the Bajaur such as tunnels, dams, and military installations. The force plays a pivotal role in the defence of various projects of CPEC. Since the US invasion of Afghanistan in 2001, the Bajaur Scouts has played a frontline role against terrorism. The force also assists local Law Enforcement Agencies in the maintenance of law and order across the region.

- Border Patrolling.
- Assist Army/FCNA in the defense of the country as and when required.
- Protect important communication centers and routes.
- Undertake counter militancy/criminal/terrorism operations on orders.
- Assist law enforcement agencies in maintenance of law and order.
- Safeguard important sites and assets

During times of extraordinary law and order crisis, the government occasionally grants power to the Chitral Scouts to arrest and detain a criminals.

== Units ==
- Headquarters Wing
- 171 Wing
- 172 Wing
- 173 Wing
- 174 Wing
- 175 Wing
- 176 Wing
- 177 Wing
