= Zhob Militia =

Paramilitary unit of the Pakistani Frontier Corps

- Active: 1852 – present
- Country: British Raj (1852–1948); Pakistan (1948–present)
- Allegiance: Pakistan
- Branch: British Indian Army (1852–1948); Frontier Corps (1948–present)
- Type: Militia/Paramilitary
- Role: Light infantry Internal security
- Size: 4,000 in 4 battalions±
- Regimental Centre: Zhob, Baluchistan

The Zhob Militia is a paramilitary regiment of the Frontier Corps, a Civil Armed Force based in Baluchistan and are one of the oldest paramilitary forces in the region. The militia is under the control of the Frontier Corps and is commanded by officers seconded from Pakistan Army.

== History ==
They were raised by Cavalry officer William Raikes-Hodson in 1852 to be an infantry scouting adjunct to the Corps of Guides and Hodson's Horse. They were raised entirely from Pashtun and Baluch tribesmen as well as Persian-speaking Afghans. Between 1917 and 1920 they acted as a Mounted infantry regiment under the command of British officers. They fought against Amānullāh Khān forces during the Third Anglo-Afghan War. The enlisted men and sepoys are mostly recruited from the Tareen, Kakar and Abdali tribes native to the region. The Militia converted from the .303 Rifle to the L1A1 Self-Loading Rifle in 1984. In the latter part of the Soviet-Afghan War, the unit carried on scouting and mounted reconnaissance operations deep into Khost and Ghazni, Afghanistan.

== Organization ==
The Zhob Militia is headquartered at Zhob Cantonment, previously called Fort Sandeman, and its four wings are located at Zhob, Sambaza, Muslim Bagh, and Qamardin Karaz. It is headed by a Brigadier with a Lt. Col commanding each wing

== Equipment ==
All Battalions are equipped along Light Infantry/Rifles lines with minimum heavy support weapons. Unlike other Infantry Battalions of the Pakistan Army, Zhob Militia does not have a Support Company having heavy weapons like Anti Tank Missiles and 120 mm Mortars. All Rifle Companies are equipped with the L1A1 Self-Loading Rifle and MG 3 machine gun only, with Support Platoons in each Company armed with 81 mm Mortars and Target-Locating Radars.

== Units ==
- Headquarters Wing
- 149 Wing
