= Dir Scouts =

Pakistani paramilitary force

- Founded: 1 April 1970
- Country: Pakistan
- Branch: Civil Armed Forces
- Size: 6 wings
- Part of: Frontier Corps Khyber Pakhtunkhwa (North)
- HQ: Central Dir

Commanders
- Commandant: Colonel Qadeer Ahmad

The Dir Scouts is a paramilitary regiment forming part of the Pakistani Frontier Corps Khyber Pakhtunkhwa (North) in Pakistan. The name alludes to the former Dir District in Khyber Pakhtunkhwa province. The regiment has a 2020/21 budget of Rs. 2.047 billion and is composed of a headquarters wing with six battalion-sized manoeuvre wings.

The Scouts are tasked with defending the border with Afghanistan and assisting with law enforcement in the areas adjacent to the border. This has also included providing security during provincial assembly elections. Previously, the Scouts also assisted with attempts to eradicate poppy cultivation.

During the 2022 Pakistan floods, the regiment assisted with rescue work and disaster relief, such as operating an emergency control centre.

== Units ==
- Headquarters Wing
- 181 Wing
- 182 Wing
- 183 Wing
- 184 Wing
- 185 Wing
- 186 Wing
