= Chagai Militia =

Paramilitary unit of Pakistan's Frontier Corps

- Active: 1907 - present
- Country: British India 1907-1948; Pakistan 1948-Present
- Allegiance: Pakistan
- Branch: British Indian Army; Frontier Corps
- Type: Militia/Paramilitary
- Role: Light Infantry; Internal Security
- Size: 5 Battalions
- Regimental Centre: Chagai, Baluchistan

The Chagai Militia (Urdu: چاغی ملیشیا) is a paramilitary unit of Pakistan's Frontier Corps, originating in the area of Chagai District in Baluchistan (Pakistan). The regiment was initially known at the Chagai Levies and was raised by British Indian Army and Police officers in the early 1900s, and renamed in 1950. It recruits traditionally from the Tareen tribe and has a sanctioned strength of 2,500 men and 70 officers. Like the other Frontier militias, it is led by commissioned officers from the Pakistan Army.
