= Frontier Corps =

Pakistani paramilitary force

Frontier Corps سرحد واہنی
- One of the two main logos of the Frontier Corps
- Abbreviation: FC
- Motto: ہر دم پُر دم (Urdu for 'Always Vibrant')

Agency overview
- Formed: 1878; 148 years ago
- Employees: 70,000 personnel as of 2017
- Annual budget: Rs. 105 billion (2024)

Jurisdictional structure
- Federal agency: Pakistan
- Operations jurisdiction: Pakistan
- Governing body: Ministry of Interior
- Constituting instrument: Frontier Corps Ordinance, 1959
- General nature: Federal law enforcement
- Specialist jurisdictions: Paramilitary law enforcement, counter insurgency, riot control; National border patrol, security, integrity

Operational structure
- Headquarters: Peshawar (FC KPK North); Wana, Lower South Waziristan District (FC KPK South); Quetta (FCB North); Turbat (FCB South)
- Elected officer responsible: Mohsin Raza Naqvi, Minister of Interior
- Agency executives: Major General Rao Imran Sartaj, Inspector General, KPK (North); Major General Atif Mujtaba, Inspector General, Balochistan (North); Major General Mehr Omer Khan, Inspector General, KPK (South); Major General Bilal Sarfaraz, Inspector General, Balochistan (South)
- Parent agency: Civil Armed Forces

Website
- www.interior.gov.pk/index.php/hq-frontier-corps-kpk-peshawar www.interior.gov.pk/index.php/hq-frontier-corps-balochistan-quetta

The Frontier Corps (Urdu: سرحد واہنی, romanised: Sarhad Wahini, reporting name: FC) are a group of four paramilitary forces of Pakistan, operating in the provinces of Balochistan and Khyber Pakhtunkhwa, to maintain law and order while overseeing the country's borders with Afghanistan and Iran. There are four Frontier Corps: FC KPK (North) and FC KPK (South) stationed in Khyber Pakhtunkhwa province (formed from the previously named North-West Frontier Province and the Federally Administered Tribal Areas), and FC Balochistan (North), FC Balochistan (South) and FC Balochistan (West) stationed in Balochistan province.

The Frontier Corps are often confused with Frontier Constabulary as both forces are abbreviated as ''FC''. Frontier Corps are group of four paramilitary forces officered by the Pakistan Army. On the other hand, Frontier Constabulary is a unified force officered by the Police Service of Pakistan.

Each Corps is headed by a seconded inspector general, who is a Pakistan Army officer of at least major-general rank, although the force itself is officially under the jurisdiction of the Interior Ministry.

With a total manpower of approximately 70,000, and a budget of Rs. 105 billion, the task of the Frontier Corps is to help local law enforcement, and to carry out border patrol, counter-insurgency, counter-terrorism and anti-smuggling operations.

Each Corps consists of several regiments, themselves composed of one or more battalion-sized wings. Some of the regiments were raised during the colonial era. These include the Chitral Scouts, the Khyber Rifles, the Kurram Militia, the Tochi Scouts, the South Waziristan Scouts, and the Zhob Militia. The Khyber Rifles were in fact regularised during the Indo-Pakistani War of 1965 and fought with distinction in Kashmir.

== History ==
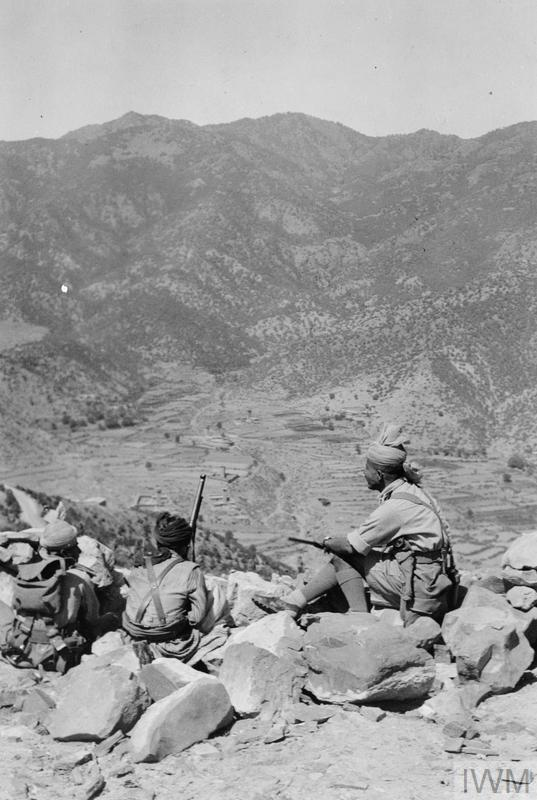
Tochi Scouts in operations against Faqir Ipi in the 1930s

The Frontier Corps was created in 1907 by Lord Curzon, the viceroy of British India, in order to organise seven militia and scout units in the tribal areas along the border with Afghanistan: the Khyber Rifles, the Zhob Militia, the Kurram Militia, the Tochi Scouts, the Chagai Militia, the South Waziristan Scouts and the Chitral Scouts.

The Frontier Corps was led by an "inspecting officer" who was a British officer of the rank of lieutenant colonel. In 1943 the inspecting officer was upgraded to an inspector general (an officer with the rank of brigadier), and the corps was expanded with the addition of new units—the Second Mahsud Scouts (raised in 1944) and the Pishin Scouts (in 1946).

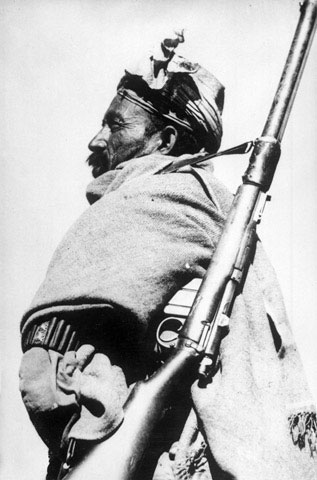
A member of the Khyber Rifles circa 1948

After Pakistan gained independence in 1947, Pakistan expanded the corps further by creating a number of new units, including the Thal Scouts, the Northern Scouts, the Bajaur Scouts, the Karakoram Scouts, the Kalat Scouts, the Dir Scouts and the Kohistan Scouts. British officers continued to serve in the Frontier Corps up to the early 1950s. The corps was split into two major subdivisions with FC Balochistan incorporating the Zhob Militia, the Sibi Scouts, the Kalat Scouts, the Makran Militia, the Kharan Rifles, the Pishin Scouts, the Chaghai Militia and the First Mahsud Scouts. In 1975 three units, the Gilgit Scouts, the Karakoram Scouts and the Northern Scouts, were merged to form a new paramilitary force called the Northern Light Infantry, which is now a full infantry regiment of the Pakistan Army.

In the mid-1970s, the Pakistani government used FC Balochistan to counter the terrorists in Balochistan, and the force is unpopular among some of the local population who associate them with and heavy-handed operations. To improve the image of the corps, it has been involved in the construction of schools and hospitals, although as of late 2004, corps installations in the province were being routinely attacked by terrorists.

In the late 1990s, the Frontier Corps played an important role in eliminating opium poppy cultivation from Dir District in Khyber Pakhtunkhwa.

In 2007, after the collapse of truce agreements between the Pakistani government and local militants, the Frontier Corps, teamed with regular Pakistani military units, conducted incursions into tribal areas controlled by the militants. The effort produced a series of bloody and clumsy confrontations. On 30 August, scores of Pakistani troops, mostly from the Frontier Corps, were captured by militants. In early November, most were released in exchange for 25 militants held by the Pakistan Army.

There is a widespread consensus among United States government military and intelligence experts that the Frontier Corps are the best potential military units against the Islamist militants because its troops are locally recruited, know local languages and understand local cultures. The United States provided more than US$7 billion in military aid to Pakistan from 2002 to 2007, most of which was used to equip the Frontier Corps because it is in the front line of the fight against the Islamist insurgents. From late 2007, the Pakistani government intended to expand the corps to 100,000 and use it more in fighting Islamist militants, particularly Al-Qaeda, after extensive consultations with the U.S. government, with a multi-year plan to bolster the effort, including the establishment of a counterinsurgency training centre. The US Obama policy for Pakistan was seen as a clear victory for the Pakistan Army lobby in the US. The $1.5 billion a year unrestricted aid recently announced will go a long way in seeing that the Frontier Corps stay at the height of their professional abilities due to new equipment and training.

The Corps has also fired occasionally on the U.S.-assisted Afghan Army.

== Role ==
- Border security duties
- Assist Army/FCNA in the defense of the country as and when required
- Protect important communication centers and routes
- Undertake counter militancy/criminal/terrorism operations on orders
- Assist law enforcement agencies in maintenance of law and order
- Safeguard important sites and assets

During times of difficulties, the government occasionally gives the FC the power to arrest and detain suspects such as in late 2012 in Balochistan and early 2013 in Quetta by orders from the Prime Minister of Pakistan. These temporary powers can be extended on the orders or consent of the provincial government, federal government, or both.

== Organisation ==
The senior command posts are filled by officers seconded from the Pakistan Army for two to three years. The four Corps are divided into forty two regiments, most of which are composed of a number of battalion-sized "wings" together with a number of training and support units. See the daughter articles for listings of regiments.

- eleven infantry and one armoured regiments in Khyber Pakhtunkhwa (North)
- ten infantry regiments in Khyber Pakhtunkhwa (South)
- ten infantry regiments in Balochistan (North)
- ten infantry regiments in Balochistan (South)

== Personnel ==
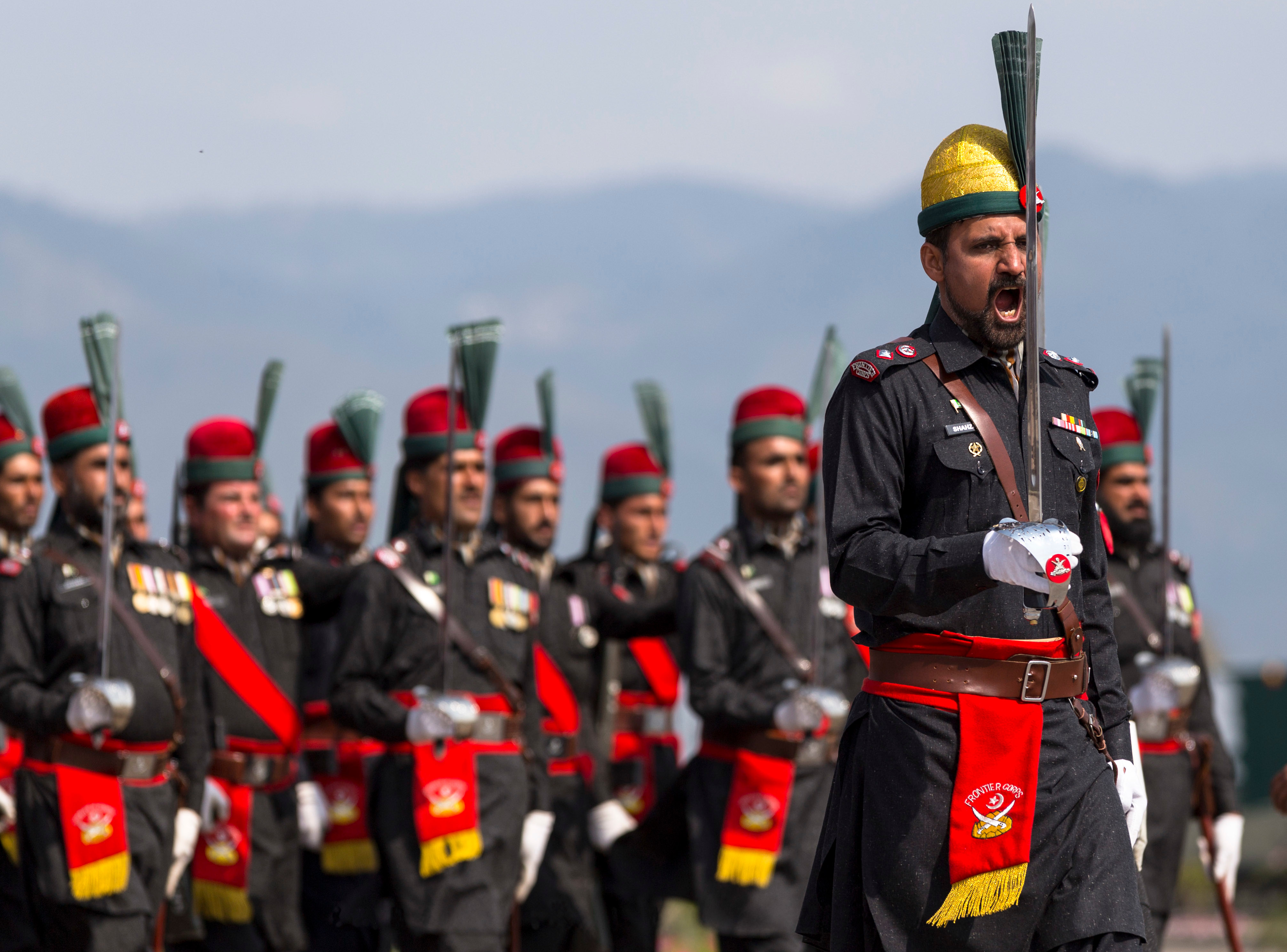
Personnel from FC KPK marching on Pakistan Day

There were a total of 70,000 active personnel as of 2017 and additional wings have been raised to meet the security challenges. Frontier Corps units are locally recruited and are officered by Pakistani Army officers.

In January 2022 during a press briefing Pakistan military spokesperson General Babar Iftikhar said, as a part of Pakistan's Western border management, 67 new wings have been established for the FC Balochistan and FC Khyber Pakhtunkhwa to strengthen border security and formation of the six more wings is in process.

=== Ranks ===
Rank group	General / flag officers		Senior officers	Junior officers
Pakistan Frontier Corps
Pakistan Frontier Corps	Commandant کمانڈنٹ	Deputy commandant ڈپٹی کمانڈنٹ۔	Senior superintendent سینئر سپرنٹنڈنٹ۔	Superintendent سپرنٹنڈنٹ۔	Assistant district officer اسسٹنٹ ڈسٹرکٹ آفیسر۔

Rank group	Junior commissioned officers			Non commissioned officer	Enlisted
Pakistan Frontier Corps							No insignia
Pakistan Frontier Corps	Subedar صوبیدار	Naib subedar نائب صوبیدار	Head constable ہیڈ کانسٹیبل۔	Havildar حوالدار	Naik نائیک	Lance naik لانس نائیک	Sepoy سپاہی

== Inspectors general ==
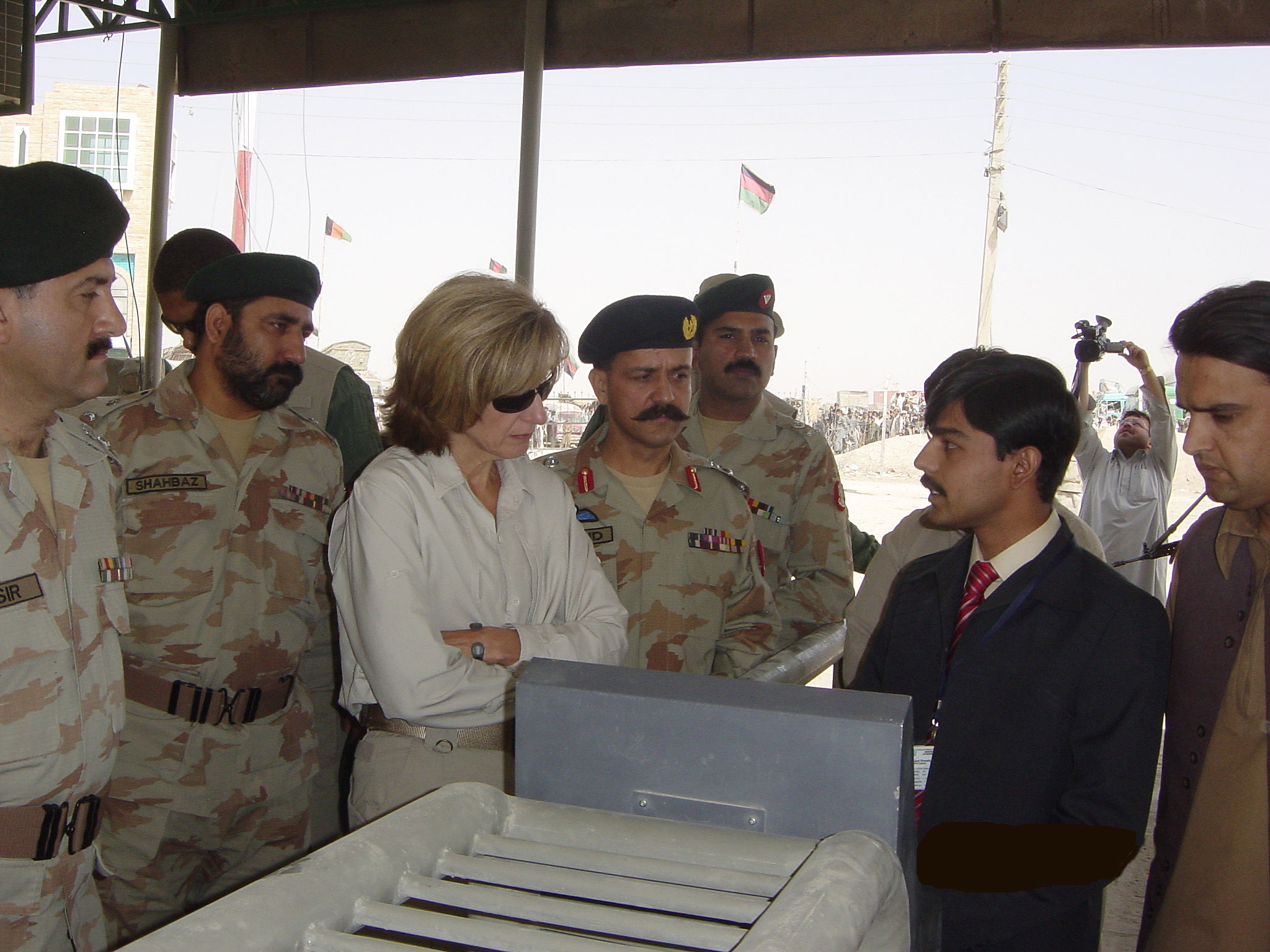
US DEA Administrator Karen P. Tandy with senior Frontier Corps Balochistan officials and Pakistani Government officials right in front of the Afghan-Pakistani border

After independence in 1947, the Inspectors-General were as follows:

1. Brig. Ahmad Jan, MBE (1950–51)
2. Brig. K A Rahim Khan (1951–53)
3. Brig. Bakhtiar Rana, MC (1953–55)
4. Brig. Sadiq Ullah Khan, M.C (1955–58)
5. Brig. Rakhman Gul, SQA, S, K, MC (1958–63)
6. Brig. Sadiq Ullah Khan, MC (1963–64)
7. Brig. Bahadur Sher, MC (1964–66)
8. Brig. Mahboob Khan, TQA (1966–69)
9. Brig. Mahmud Jan, SQA (1969–71)
10. Maj. Gen. Shireen Dil Khan Niazi (1971–72)
11. Brig. Iftikhar e Bashir (1972)
12. Maj. Gen. Naseerullah Babar, SJ & Bar (1972–74)

== See also ==
- Law enforcement in Pakistan
- Civil Armed Forces
- National Guard (Pakistan)
- Pakistan Levies
- Military history of the North-West Frontier
- Insurgency in Khyber Pakhtunkhwa
- Insurgency in Balochistan
