= Civil Armed Forces =

Pakistani paramilitary forces

- Service branches: Pakistan Rangers; Punjab Rangers; Sindh Rangers; Frontier Corps; Frontier Corps Khyber Pakhtunkhwa (North); Frontier Corps Khyber Pakhtunkhwa (South); Frontier Corps Balochistan (North); Frontier Corps Balochistan (South); Federal Constabulary; Pakistan Coast Guards; Gilgit-Baltistan Scouts
- Headquarters: Ministry of Interior, Islamabad

Leadership
- Commander-in-Chief: President Asif Ali Zardari
- Prime Minister: Shehbaz Sharif
- Minister of Interior: Mohsin Raza Naqvi

Personnel
- Active personnel: 291,000

Related articles
- History: Military history of Pakistan; Wars Involving Pakistan
- Ranks: Army ranks and insignia Naval ranks and insignia Air Force ranks and insignia

The Civil Armed Forces (CAF) are a group of ten paramilitary and gendarmerie organizations which fall under the Ministry of Interior, separate and distinct from the regular Pakistan Armed Forces, which fall under the Ministry of Defence. They are responsible for maintaining internal security, engaging in law enforcement, border control, counterinsurgency and counterterrorism, riot control, and anti-smuggling. They frequently operate alongside the Pakistani military in response to natural disasters. During times of war, they can have their command transferred to the Ministry of Defence, and effectively combined to form a reserve force for the Pakistani military.

== History ==
Some CAF units were originally raised in the colonial era on the frontiers of the empire and played a key role in the consolidation of control by building a link between the state and communities in strategically sensitive frontier areas through recruitment to government service. In many areas paramilitary units continue to play exactly the same historical role decades after independence.

The CAF are currently undergoing significant expansion, with 57 additional wings approved for raising in 2015–16 to address internal and border security challenges and to provide protection for the China-Pakistan Economic Corridor (CPEC). This expansion is coordinated by a new two-star command established in September 2016, the Special Security Division.

The CAF are paid for from the budget of the Ministry of Interior which also provides administrative support. However, they are (with the exception of the Frontier Constabulary) commanded by officers on secondment from the Pakistan Army. They function under the operational control of army corps headquarters not only in wartime but also whenever Article 245 of the Constitution of Pakistan is invoked to provide "military aid to civil power", as in Karachi since 2015 and in Punjab since February 2017.

== List of forces ==
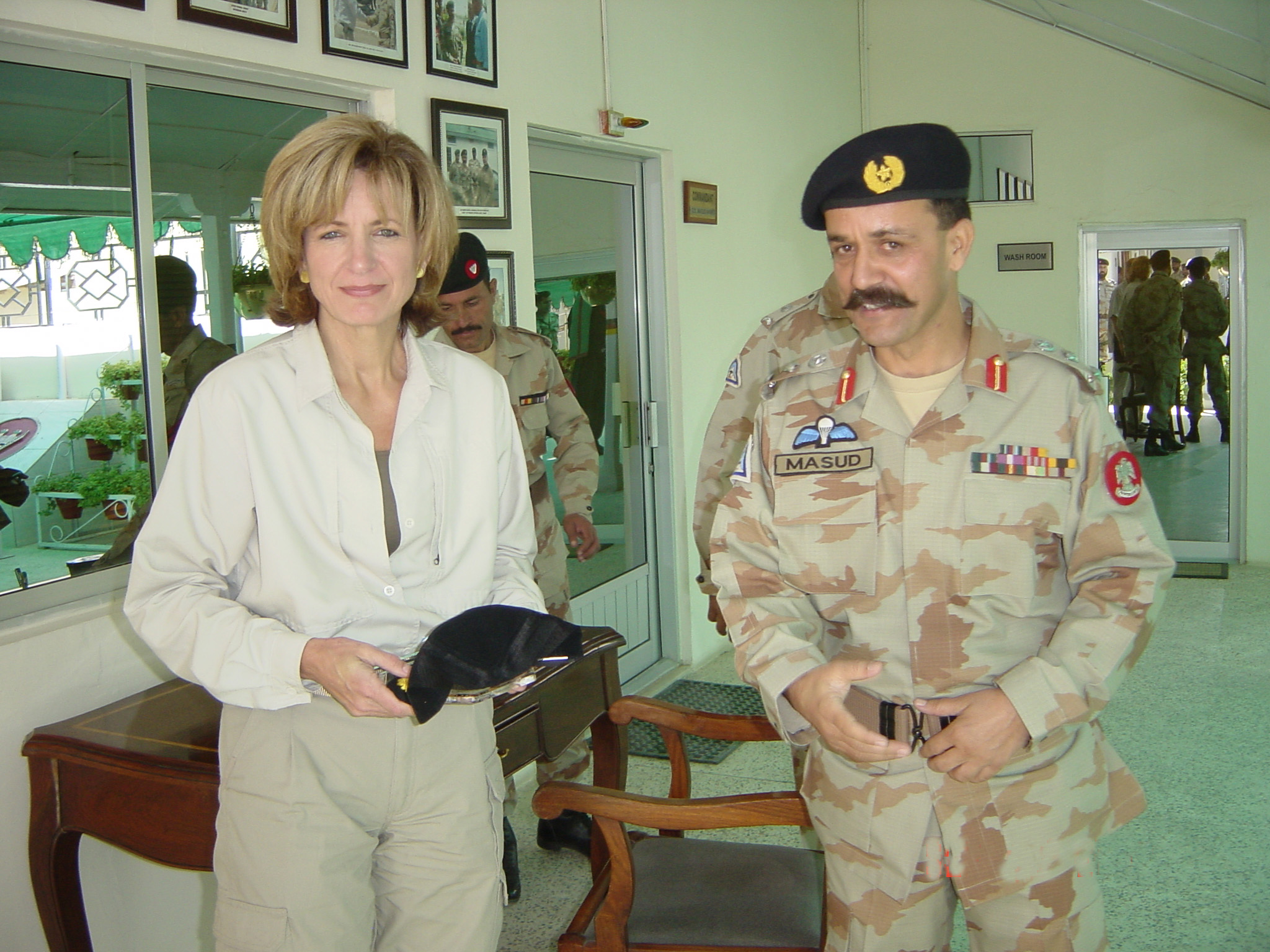
Colonel Masud, Commandant of the Frontier Corps' Pishin Scouts (right), presents U.S. Drug Enforcement Administrator Karen P. Tandy (left) with his unit ballcap in Chaman, Balochistan, Pakistan, September 2007

- Punjab Rangers
  - Headquartered in Lahore.
  - Divided into five commands, each composed of several battalion-sized "wings" of approximately 800 men each.
  - This force has a border security role on the Punjab provincial external border with India. It also performs internal security duties (counterinsurgency, counter-gang, public order, etc.) under the operational control of Pakistan Army corps commanders.
- Sindh Rangers
  - Headquartered in Karachi.
  - Divided into seven commands, each composed of several battalion-sized "wings" of approximately 800 men each.
  - This force has a border security role on the Sindh provincial external border with India. It also performs internal security duties (counterinsurgency, counter-gang, public order, etc.) under the operational control of Pakistan Army corps commanders.
- Frontier Corps Khyber Pakhtunkhwa (North)
  - Formed in 2017 by the splitting of Frontier Corps Khyber Pakhtunkhwa.
  - Headquartered in Peshawar.
  - Composed of eleven infantry and one armoured regiment, each formed from several battalion-sized "wings".
  - Under the command of the Army's XI Corps, the force has been in the forefront of counter-insurgency operations against the Tehrik-i-Taliban Pakistan and foreign militants since 2003.
- Frontier Corps Khyber Pakhtunkhwa (South)
  - Formed in 2017 by the splitting of Frontier Corps Khyber Pakhtunkhwa.
  - Headquartered in Dera Ismail Khan.
  - Composed of ten infantry regiments, each formed from several battalion-sized "wings".
  - Under the command of the XI Corps, the force has been in the forefront of counter-insurgency operations against the Tehrik-i-Taliban Pakistan and foreign militants since 2003.
- Frontier Corps Balochistan (North)
  - Formed in 2017 by the splitting of Frontier Corps Balochistan.
  - Headquartered in Quetta.
  - Composed of ten infantry regiments, each formed from several battalion-sized "wings".
  - Under the command of the XII Corps, the force has been in the forefront of counter-insurgency operations against the Pakistani Taliban, Baloch separatists, and the Islamic State's Khorasan branch.
- Frontier Corps Balochistan (South)
  - Formed in 2017 by the splitting of Frontier Corps Balochistan.
  - Headquartered in Turbat.
  - Composed of ten infantry regiments, each formed from several battalion-sized "wings".
  - Under the command of the XII Corps, the force has been in the forefront of counter-insurgency operations against Baloch separatists, Baloch Islamist-Jihadists, and the Islamic State's Pakistan branch.
- Frontier Corps Balochistan (West)
  - Formed in 2026 by splitting the Frontier Corps Balochistan(South).
  - Headquartered in Khuzdar.
  - Under the command of the XII Corps, the force will be in the forefront of counter-insurgency operations against Baloch separatists and guard Iran-Pakistan border.
- Federal Constabulary (formerly Frontier Constabulary
  - Formed in 1915 as the Frontier Constabulary before being renamed in 2024.
  - Headquartered in Islamabad (moved from Peshawar Cantonment).
  - This is a gendarmerie that as of 2024 operates all over Pakistan. It used to only operate in the border districts of Balochistan and border/tribal districts Khyber Pakhtunkhwa, which were formerly known as the Federally Administered Tribal Areas, and was also used in Karachi to fight crime.
  - Unlike the Frontier Corps, it's commanded by officers from the Police Service of Pakistan.
- Pakistan Coast Guards
  - Formed in 1973.
  - Headquartered in Karachi.
  - Split into two sectors, each commended by a Brigadier and a few Colonels
    - Sector West in Balochistan
    - Sector East in Sindh
  - The force should not be confused with the Maritime Security Agency, which is a coast guard in the Pakistan Navy which operates deeper into the ocean.
  - Tasked with protecting the coastal areas of Balochistan and Sindh Province. Largely a shore-based force with a particular focus on combating smuggling
  - Commanded by a two-star rank Major-General, seconded from the Pakistan Army.
- Gilgit Baltistan Scouts
  - Formed in 2003 as a replacement CAF after the previously paramilitary Northern Light Infantry was converted into a regular infantry regiment of the Pakistan Army in recognition of their performance during the Kargil War.
  - Headquartered in Gilgit.
  - Composed of six battalion-sized "wings".
  - Under the command of the Army's Force Command Northern Areas, the force has been involved in providing security for infrastructure projects in the China–Pakistan Economic Corridor.
- 50 Aviation Squadron of the Ministry of Interior is the nucleus of an air wing designed to provide additional air support to CAFs, including in disaster relief and medical evacuations.

== Ranks ==
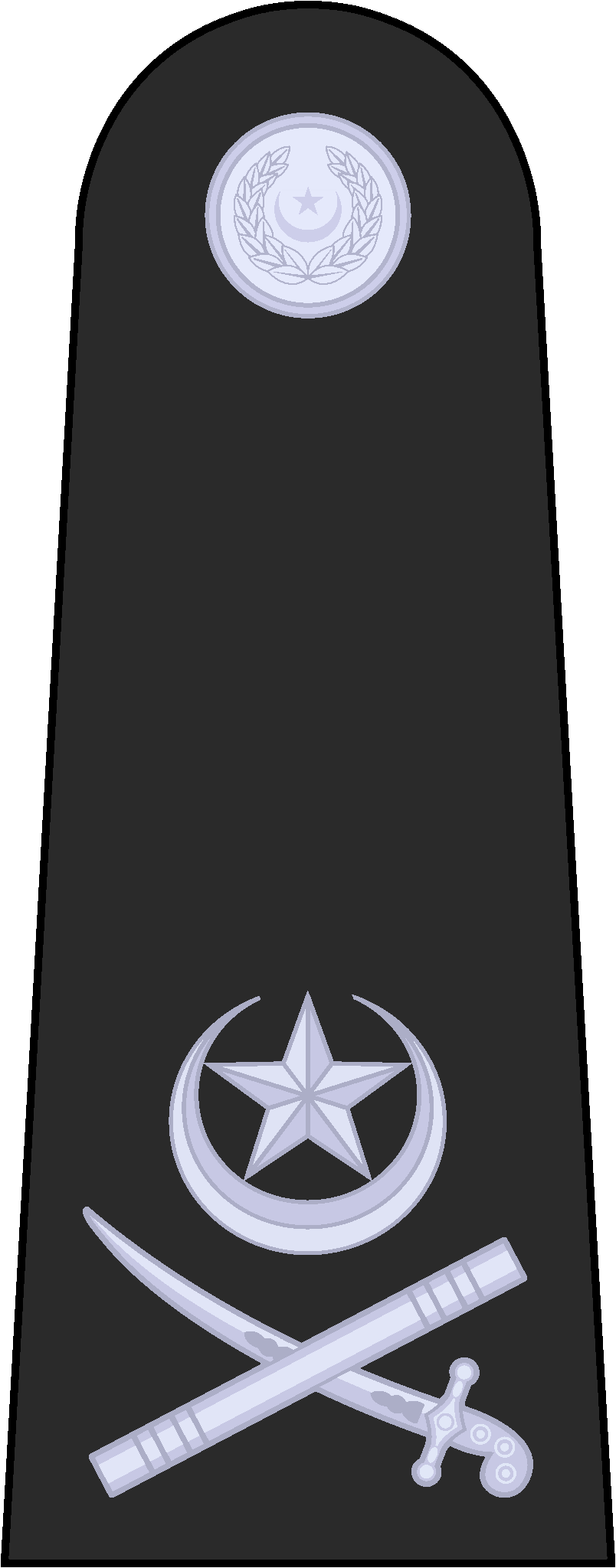
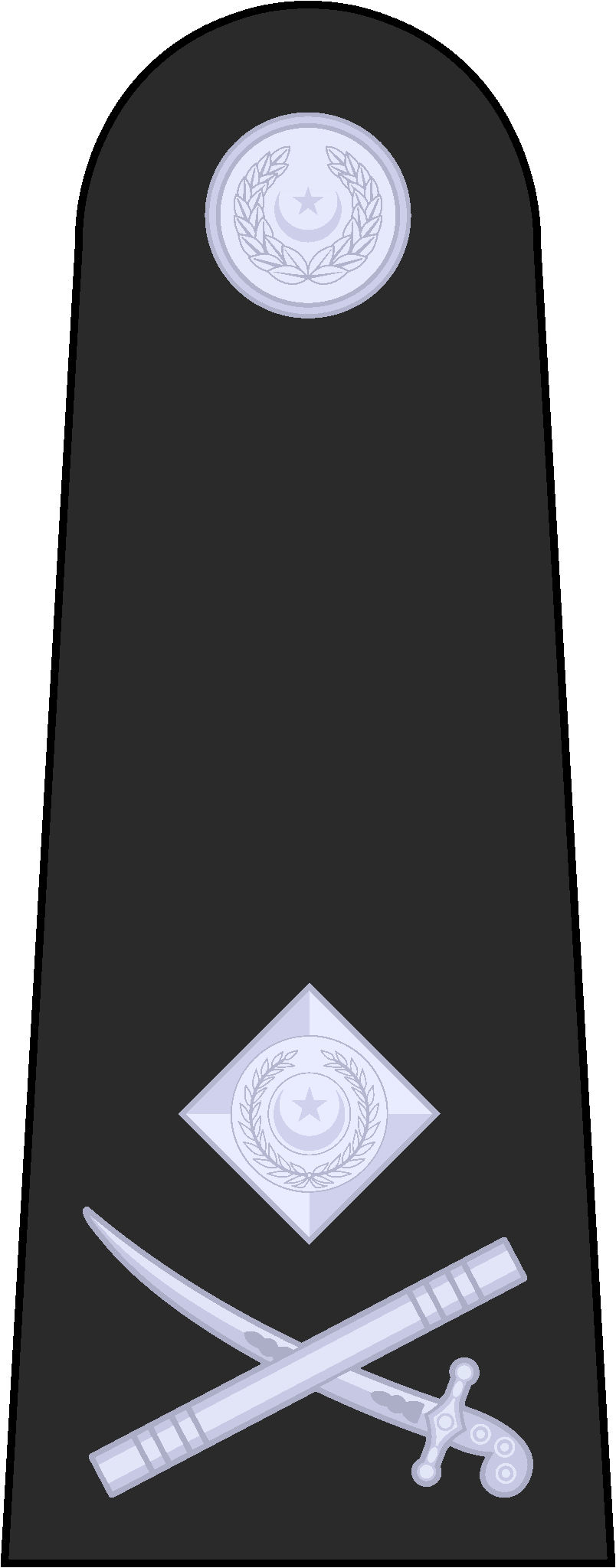
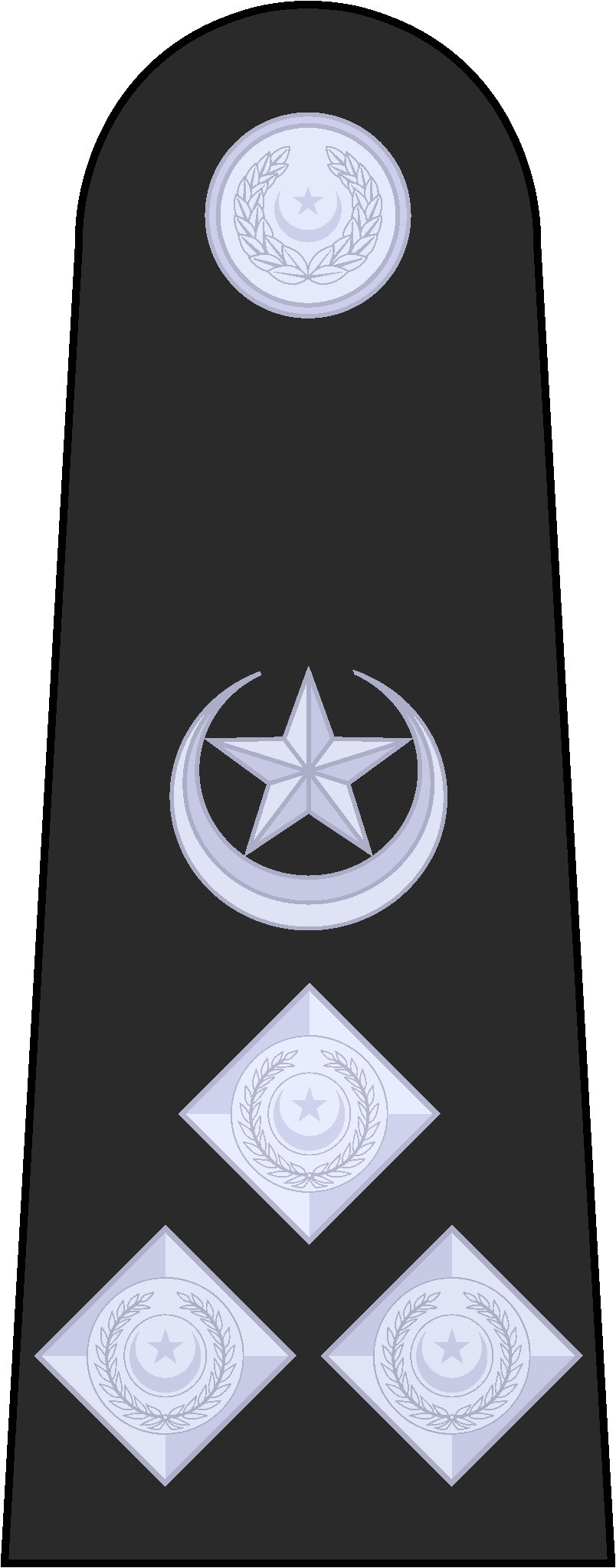
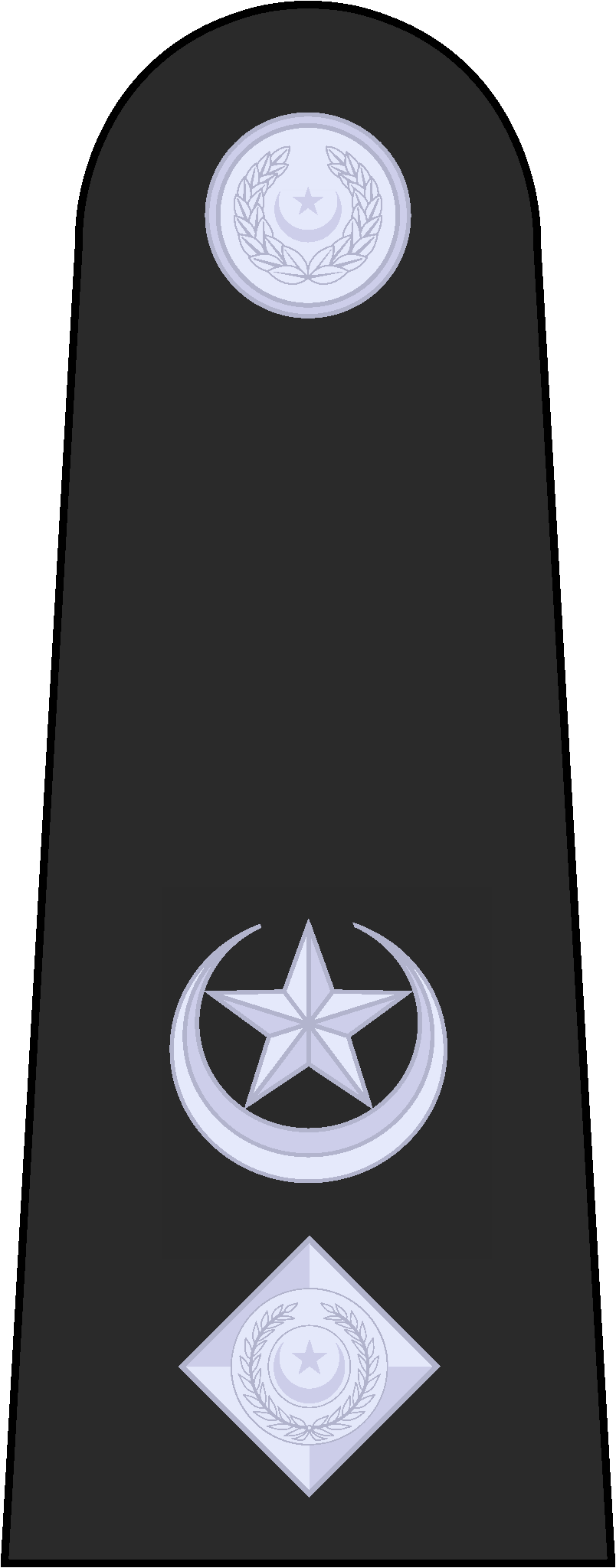
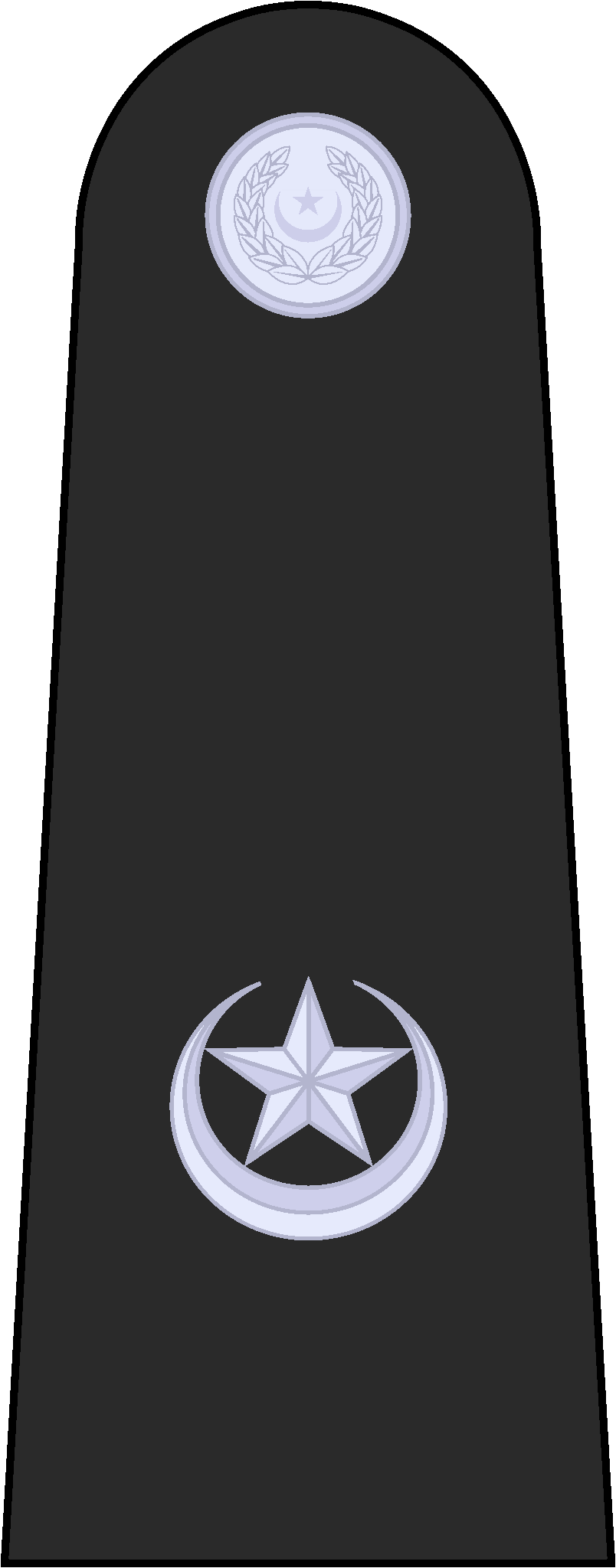
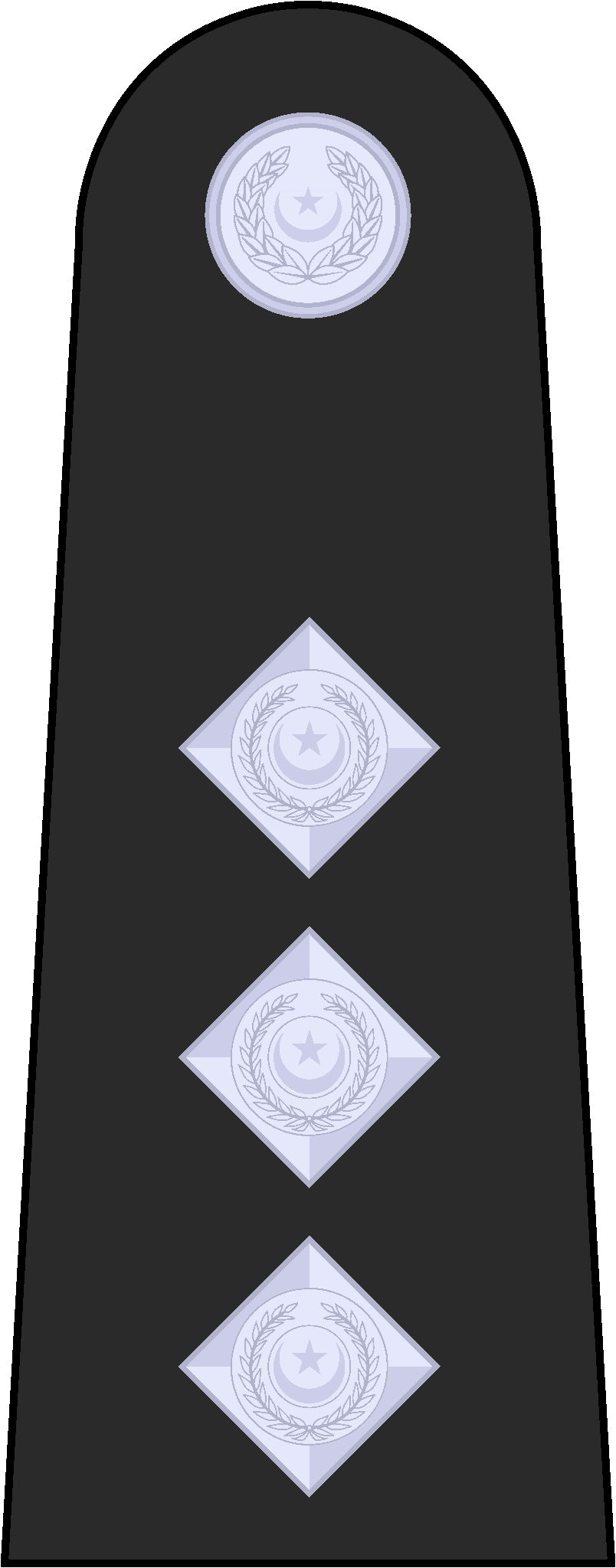
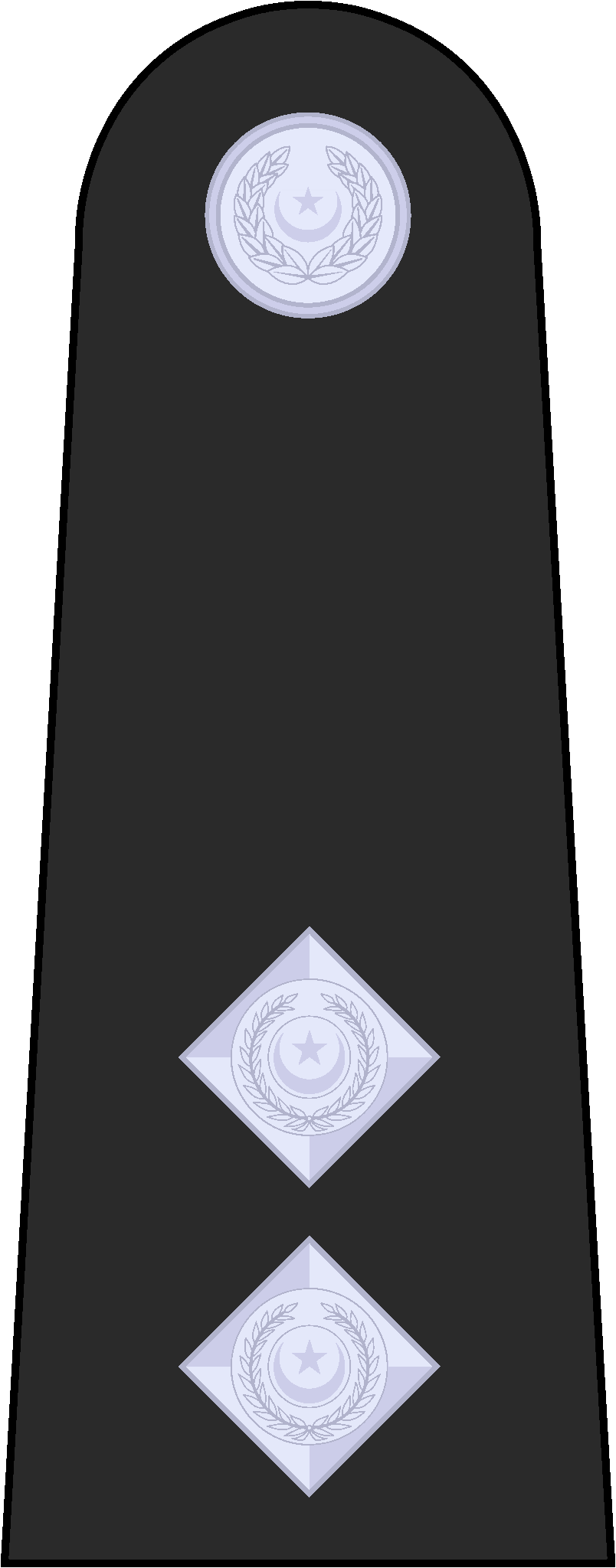
Rank group	General / flag officers		Senior officers			Junior officers
Pakistan Rangers
Pakistan Rangers	Director general ڈائریکٹر جنرل			Senior superintendent of the Rangers سینئر سپرنٹنڈنٹ۔	Superintendent of the Rangers سپرنٹنڈنٹ	Deputy superintendent of the Rangers ڈپٹی سپرنٹنڈنٹ۔	Inspector انسپکٹر	Direct Entry Sub inspector ڈائریکٹ انٹری سب انسپکٹر۔
Pakistan; Federal Constabulary
Pakistan; Federal Constabulary	Commandant Federal Constabulary کمانڈنٹ	Deputy commandant ڈپٹی کمانڈنٹ۔		District officer ضلعی افسر۔		Assistant district officer اسسٹنٹ ڈسٹرکٹ آفیسر۔
Pakistan Frontier Corps
Pakistan Frontier Corps	Commandant کمانڈنٹ	Deputy commandant ڈپٹی کمانڈنٹ۔		Senior superintendent سینئر سپرنٹنڈنٹ۔		Superintendent سپرنٹنڈنٹ۔	Assistant district officer اسسٹنٹ ڈسٹرکٹ آفیسر۔
Gilgit−Baltistan Scouts
Gilgit−Baltistan Scouts		Brigadier بریگیڈیئر	Colonel کرنل	Lieutenant colonel لیفٹیننٹ کرنل	Major میجر	Captain کیپٹن	Lieutenant لیفٹنینٹ	Second lieutenant سیکنڈ لیفٹیننٹ
Pakistan Coast Guards
Pakistan Coast Guards	Major general میجر جنرل	Brigadier بریگیڈیئر	Colonel کرنل	Lieutenant colonel لیفٹیننٹ کرنل	Major میجر	Captain کیپٹن	Lieutenant لیفٹنینٹ	Second lieutenant سیکنڈ لیفٹیننٹ
Rank group	General / flag officers		Senior officers			Junior officers

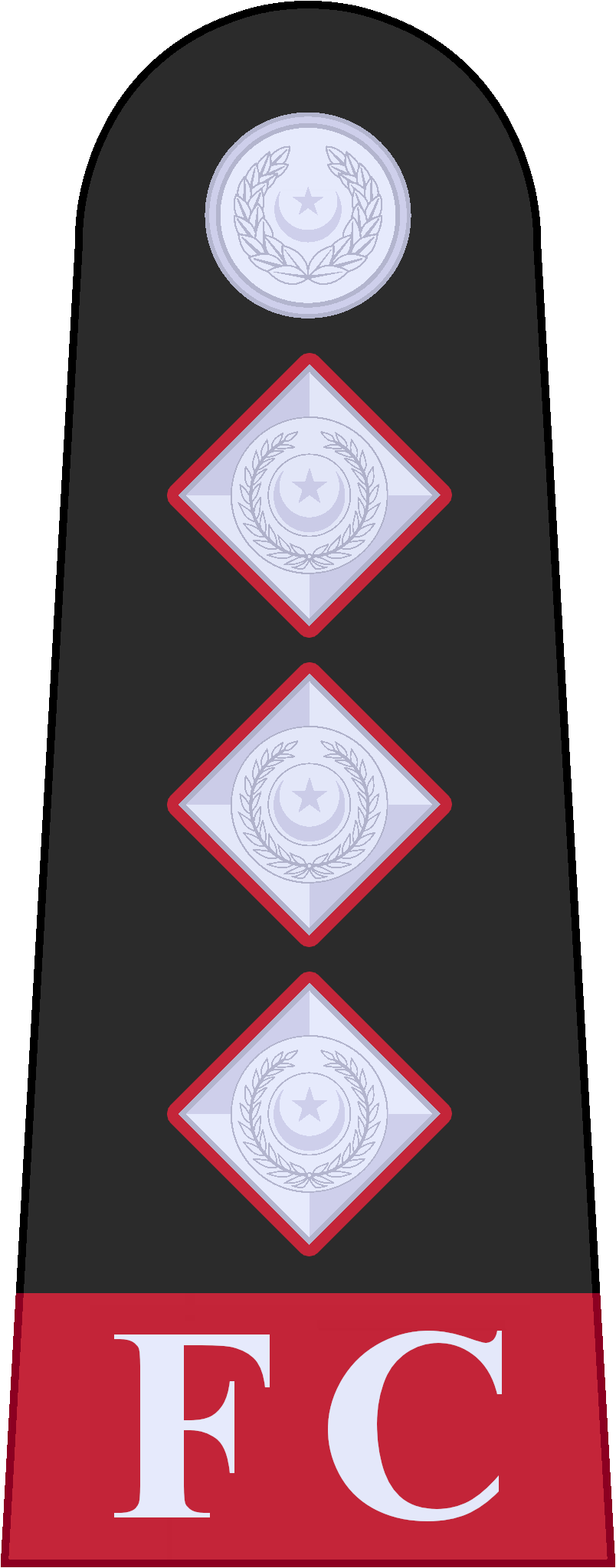
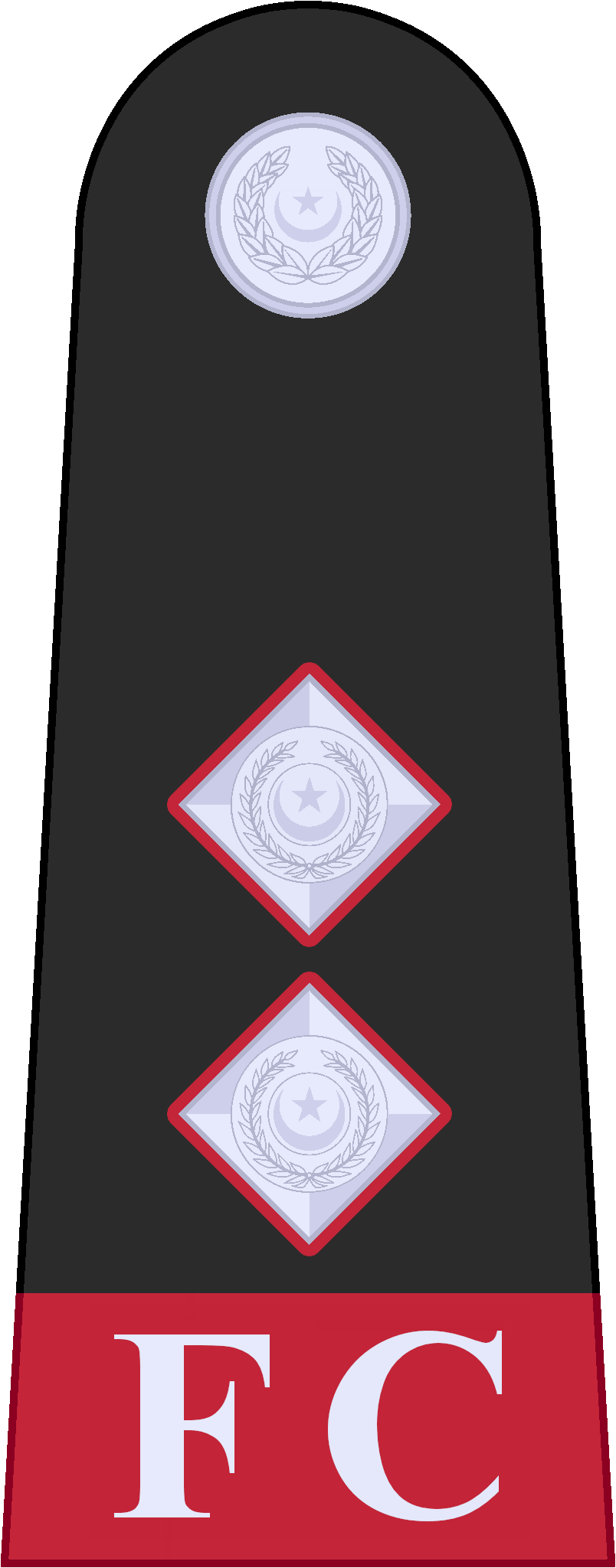
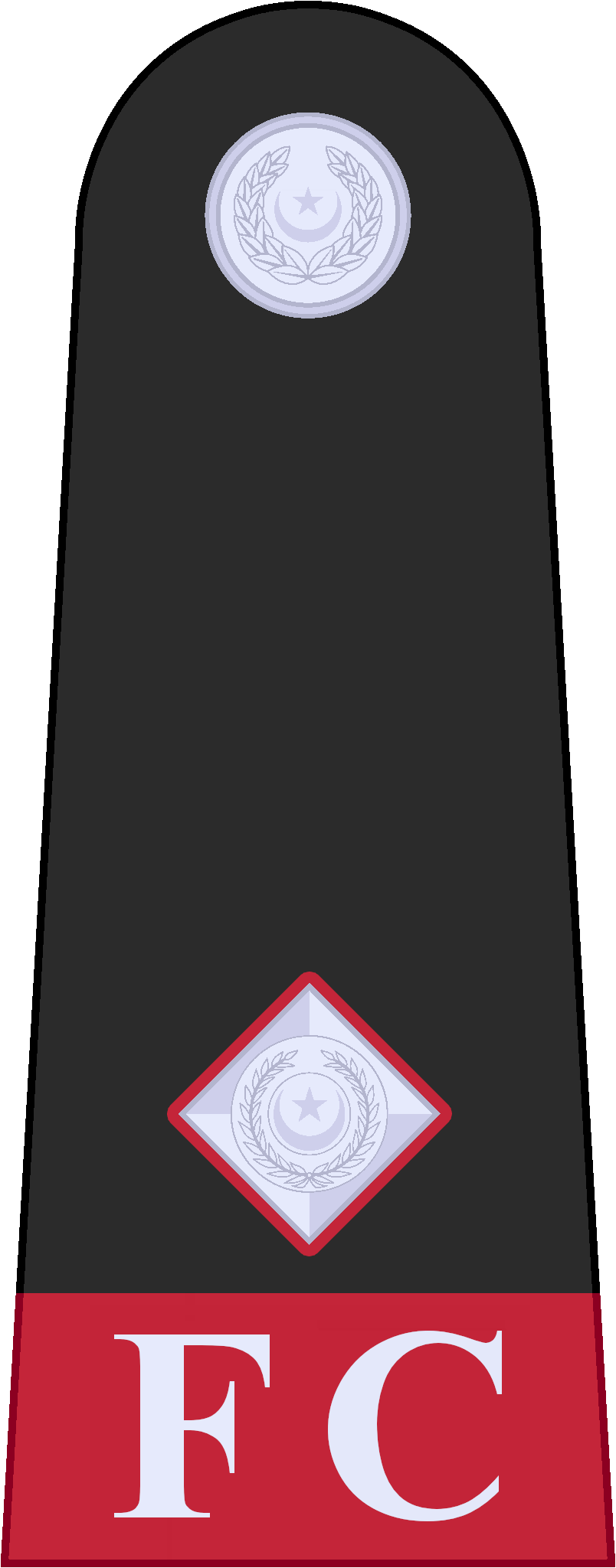
Rank group	Junior commissioned officers				Non commissioned officer			Enlisted
Pakistan Rangers								No insignia
Pakistan Rangers	Senior inspector سینئر انسپکٹر۔	Inspector انسپکٹر	Sub inspector سب انسپکٹر۔		Havildar حوالدار۔	Naik نائیک۔	Lance Naik لانس نائیک۔	Sepoy سپاہی۔
Pakistan; Federal Constabulary								No insignia
Pakistan; Federal Constabulary	Subedar-Major صوبیدار میجر	Subedar صوبیدار	Naib Subedar نائب صوبیدار		Havildar حوالدار۔	Naik نائیک۔	Lance Naik لانس نائیک۔	Constable کانسٹیبل
Pakistan Frontier Corps								No insignia
Pakistan Frontier Corps		Subedar صوبیدار	Naib subedar نائب صوبیدار	Head constable ہیڈ کانسٹیبل۔	Havildar حوالدار	Naik نائیک	Lance naik لانس نائیک	Sepoy سپاہی
Gilgit−Baltistan Scouts								No insignia
Gilgit−Baltistan Scouts	Subedar-Major صوبیدار میجر	Subedar صوبیدار	Naib Subedar نائب صوبیدار		Havildar حوالدار۔	Naik نائیک۔	Lance Naik لانس نائیک۔	Sepoy سپاہی۔
Pakistan Coast Guards								No insignia
Pakistan Coast Guards	Subedar-Major صوبیدار میجر	Subedar صوبیدار	Naib Subedar نائب صوبیدار		Havildar حوالدار۔	Naik نائیک۔	Lance Naik لانس نائیک۔	Sepoy سپاہی۔
Rank group	Junior commissioned officers				Non commissioned officer			Enlisted

== See also ==
- Law enforcement in Pakistan
- Pakistan Armed Forces
- National Guard (Pakistan)
- Pakistan Levies
