= List of Pashtuns =

Collection of notable Pashtun figures

Pashtuns, also known as Pakhtuns and Afghans are an ethnic group that inhabit Afghanistan and Pakistan . They are one of the most populous ethnic groups in both countries. There is a significant Pashtuns diaspora in neighbouring countries such as India and Iran.

Pashtuns are traditionally organised into tribal divisions, and their society is defined by the Pashtunwali, the traditional code by which they live. It is extremely important in the social structure and interactions of the Pashtun tribes.

There are more than 350–400 Pashtun tribes making Pashtuns the world's largest segmentary lineage society.

== Rulers and generals ==
- Sultan Pakhal Swati - Founder of the Gibari Empire, also known as the Sultanate of Swat.
- Sultan Jehangir Khan Swati - Sultan of the Sultanate of Swat, ruling from Swat. Grandson of Sultan Pakhal.
- Jalal-ud-din Khilji (1290–1296) – Founder of the Khilji dynasty.
- Alauddin Khilji (1296–1316) – Famous for military campaigns and market reforms.
- Qutb-ud-din Mubarak Shah (1316–1320) – Last ruler of the Khilji dynasty.
- Bahlul Lodi – founder of Lodi Dynasty (reigned 1451–1489), most powerful of the Pashtun chiefs, who replaced the last king of the Sayyid dynasty in 1451
- Sikandar Lodi – Sultan of Delhi
- Ibrahim Lodi – Sultan of Delhi Lodi Dynasty Reign 1517 – 21 April 1526
- Amir Kror Suri
- Sher Shah Suri – Sultan of the Sur Empire Reign 17 May 1540 – 22 May 1545
- Adil Shah Suri – Last ruler of the Sur Dynasty
- Islam Shah Suri – Sultan of the Sur Empire Reign 27 May 1545 – 22 November 1554
- Firuz Shah Suri – Firuz Shah Suri
- Muhammad Adil Shah, Sultan of Hindustan
- Ibrahim Shah Suri – Sultan of the Sur Empire
- Sikandar Shah Suri – Sultan of the Sur Empire
- Abdur Rahman Khan – monarch of Afghanistan in the late 19th century
- Ahmad Shah Durrani – founding father of Afghanistan
- Shah Mahmud Hotaki, also known as the Conqueror, third Ruler of Hotak dynasty
- Abdul Aziz Hotak – second ruler of the Afghan Hotaki dynasty
- Malak Ahmad Khan Yusufzai – First ruler and founder of Modern-day Pashtunkhwa
- Gaju Khan Yousafzai – Pashtun revolutionary leader, ruled from Kunar to Taxila
- Wazir Akbar Khan – Emir of Afghanistan
- Jahan Khan – Commander-in-Chief of the Durrani Empire
- Amanullah Khan – Ghazi of the Third Anglo-Afghan War and King of Afghanistan from 1919 to 1929
- Amir Khan – Nawab of Tonk
- Ashraf Hotaki – Shah of Persia from 1725 to 1729 and fourth ruler of the Hotaki dynasty
- Ayub Shah – Afghan king
- Azim Khan – Barakzai noble and governor of Kashmir
- Azad Khan Afghan – Pashtun who was a major contender for supremacy in ruling Persia
- Daud Khan Panni – Mughal general
- Daud Khan Rohilla – a founder of Rohilkhand
- Daulat Khan Lodi – Governor of Lahore under the Lodi dynasty
- Dilir Khan Daudzai – 17th century Mughal general
- Dost Mohammad of Bhopal – Nawab of Bhopal
- Dost Mohammad Khan – monarch of Afghanistan in the 19th century
- Habibullah Khan – King/Emir of Afghanistan
- Haibat Khan Niazi – Commander of Niazi contingent of Sher Shah Suri's army and Governor of Punjab
- Hafiz Rahmat Khan Barech – Rohilla Chieftain
- Hamid Khan Lodi – founder of Lodi dynasty of Multan after the end of Arab rule in 961 A.D
- Hamidullah Khan – last Nawab of former Bhopal state in India
- Hussain Hotak – last ruler of the Hotaki dynasty at Kandahār
- Inayatullah Khan – Afghan king
- Isa Khan Niazi – Masnad-e-Aali in reign of Sher Shah Suri shafqat zaman
- Khawas Khan Marwat – general of Sher Shah Suri
- Khushal Khan Khattak – Warrior-Poet and Chief of the Khattak tribe of Pashtuns
- Malik Akora Khattak - Great grandfather of Khushal Khan Khattak and Chief of Khattak tribe
- Mahmud Hotak – Shah of Persia from 1722 to 1725 and third ruler of the Hotak Dynasty
- Mahmud Shah Durrani – monarch of Afghanistan in the 18th century
- Mirwais Hotak – founder of the Afghan Hotak dynasty in Kandahār
- Mohammad Akbar Khan – Afghan prince and warrior
- Mohammad Ayub Khan – Afghan Royal Prince and Emir of Afghanistan, fondly remembered as the Victor of Maiwand
- Muhammad Habib Khan Tarin – Nawab, chieftain and cavalry officer
- Muhammad Khan Bangash – founder of Farrukhabad state in the early 18th century
- Mohammad Nadir Shah – King of Afghanistan from 1929 to 1933
- Mohammad Yaqub Khan – monarch of Afghanistan in the late 19th century
- Mohammed Zahir Shah – last king of Afghanistan, reigned for 40 years
- Muhammad Mahabat Khan III – last Nawab of Junagarh (defunct title)
- Najabat Khan – Pashtun Nawab and renowned warrior
- Najib Khan Yousafzai – Afghan Rohilla Nawab instrumental in the Afghan victory at Panipat III, inflicting the largest ever number of fatalities in a classic formation between two armies
- Nasrullah Khan – Shahzada Crown Prince of Afghanistan
- Nawab Muzaffar Khan – Durrani Nawab of Multan
- Shah Shujah Durrani (Sadozai) – former king of Afghanistan
- Sher Shah Suri – Afghan king of India and founder of the Sur Empire
- Timur Shah Durrani – monarch of Afghanistan, second ruler of the Durrani Empire
- Zabita Khan – Rohilla chieftain
- Zain Khan Sirhindi – Durrani general
- Zaman Shah Durrani – monarch of Afghanistan
- Khwaja Usman – Pashtun Chieftain warrior of Bengal
- Hakim Khan Sur – Army General of Maharana Pratap in Battle of Haldighati
- Kalu Khan Yousafzai – Afghan warrior and military leader in 16th Century who inflicted one of the greatest defeats of the Mughal Empire in the Battle of the Malandari Pass (1586)
- Sartor Faqir – Pashtun tribal Yusufzai leader and freedom fighter; declared a jihad against the British Empire in 1897
- Mullah Omar - Founder of Taliban

== Artists ==
=== Afghanistan ===
- Farhad Darya (Afghanistan) – Afghan singer and composer, known for his contributions to Afghan music.
- Ahmad Zahir (Afghanistan) – Pashtun singer and composer, known for his brilliant musical talent.

=== Pakistan ===
- Abdul Ghani Khan (Pakistan/Afghanistan) – Pashto poet, writer, philosopher, and artist
- Ameer Hamza Shinwari (Pakistan/Afghanistan) - Pashto Poet, Writer, philosopher etc
- Sardar Ali Takkar (Pakistan/Afghanistan) – popular sufist Pashto singer.
- Rahim Shah (Pakistan) – popular Pashto and Urdu singer
- Khyal Muhammad (Pakistan) – prominent Pashto folk singer
- Gulzar Alam (Afghanistan/Pakistan) – Pashto singer and music composer
- Gul Panra (Pakistan) – Urdu-Pashto female singer
- Zeb Bangash (Pakistan) – Urdu-Pashto folk singer
- Zeek Afridi (Pakistan) – Urdu-Pashto folk singer
- Badar Munir (Pakistan) – Pashto Film former actor
- Kushhal Khan (Pakistan) – Pashto model and actor

=== United Kingdom ===
- M Huncho (Afghan-British) – Afghan-British rapper and singer from London.
- Imran Ahmed - political strategist and CEO of the Center for Countering Digital Hate

== Authors ==
=== Afghanistan ===
- Kabir Stori, Pashtun nationalist writer and poet who founded and served as chairman of the Pashtuns Social Democratic Party (PSDP)
- Khushal Khattak, Pashtun poet, tribal chief, warrior and the national poet of Afghanistan
- Abdul Hai Habibi, prominent Afghan historian and a member of the National Assembly of Afghanistan
- Abdul Rauf Benawa, writer, poet, journalist, historian, and social activist of Afghanistan.
- Abdul Shakoor Rashad, prominent researcher, professor of Pashto language, and author of several books.

=== Pakistan ===
- Khan Abdul Ghani Khan – Pashto poet, philosopher, and writer
- Hamza Shinwari – Pashto poet and writer known for his romantic poetry
- Ajmal Khattak – Pashto poet, writer, and politician
- Rahman Baba – Pashto poet and Sufi saint
- Abaseen Yousafzai – Pashto poet known for his modernist poetry
- Hafiz Alpuri – Pashto Poet
- Khatir Afridi – Pashto poet and writer
- Malala Yousafzai – Pashto writer, activist, and Nobel Peace Prize laureate

=== India ===
- Sri M, born Mumtaz Ali Khan, Author, Educationist, Spiritual Guide, Yogi of Nath tradition, founder of Sathsang Foundation and Bharat Yoga Vidya Kendra, Padma Bhushan awardee

== Aviators ==
=== Afghanistan ===
- Abdul Ahad Momand (Afghanistan) – 4th Muslim astronaut who visited Space and first Muslim in the entire world who bring Quran to the moon. Due to Abdul Ahad Momand, Islam is now the 4th religion practiced in space. He spoke Pashto in space so Pashto is the 4th language spoken in the space.

=== Pakistan ===
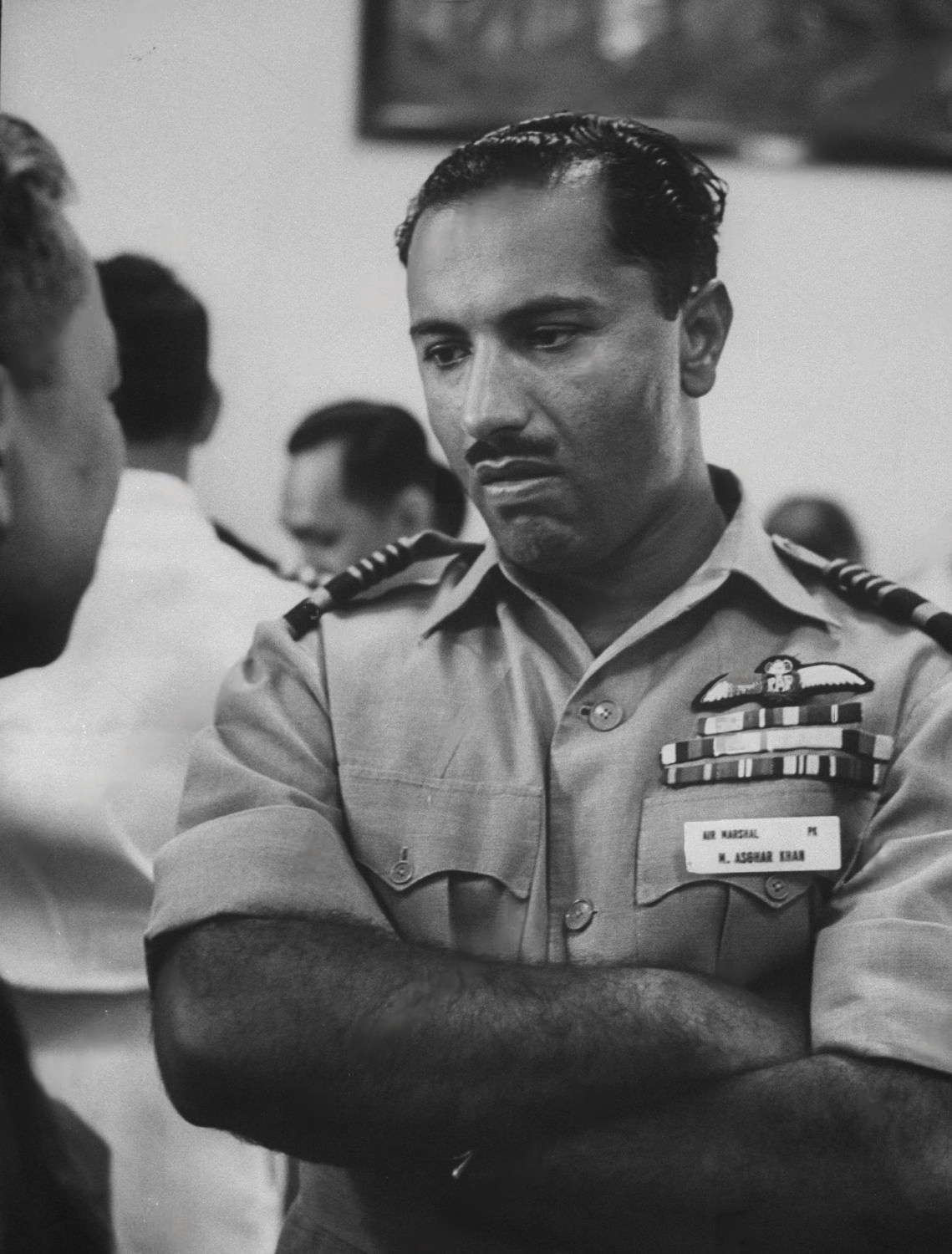
Air Marshal Asghar Khan, first native Commander-in-Chief of the Pakistan Air Force, politician, and author was from the Afridi tribe of Pashtuns.

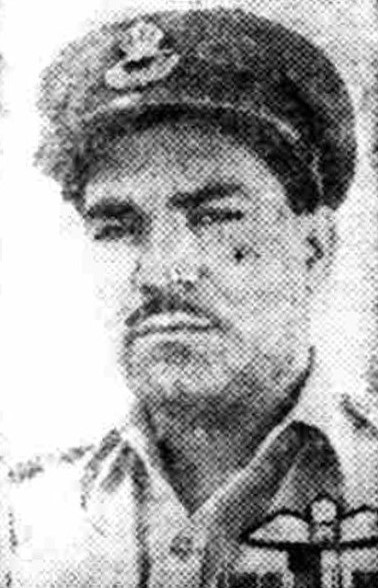
Air Vice Marshal Khyber Khan, former Deputy Chief of Air Staff of the PAF and diplomat

- Air Marshal Asghar Khan – First native Commander-in-Chief of the Pakistan Air Force and first pilot from the Indian subcontinent to fly a fighter jet, the Gloster Meteor III.
- Air Vice Marshal Khyber Khan – former Deputy Chief of Air Staff of the PAF and diplomat
- Jahangir Khan (Pakistan) – Pakistani tourist who became the first Pashtun and the second Pakistani to fly around the world in commercial aircraft.
- Hakeemullah Khan Durrani (Pakistan) – Former Pakistani Air Marshal and Chief of Air Staff of the Pakistan Air Force.

== Architects ==
- Sharif Fayez – Afghan architect and urban planner who has contributed to the rebuilding efforts in Afghanistan.
- Hayatullah Khan Durrani – Afghan architect and urban planner who has played a vital role in the development and reconstruction of Afghanistan.

== Businesspeople ==
- Afghanistan
- Mirwais Azizi (born 1962) is a Dubai-based Afghan businessman. He is the chairman of Azizi Group of companies, which he founded in 1989 with a presence in realty, banking, investment, and hospitality.
- Mahmud Karzai is Afghan Businessman Net Worth: $900 Million Industry: Real Estate and Energy.
- Hashmat Karzai was an Afghan-American businessman and political advisor.
- Pakistan
- Javed Afridi – Pakistani business tycoon, Owner of Peshawar Zalmi.
- Begum Kulsum Saifullah Khan (Pakistan) – Pakistani businesswoman.
- Nasrullah Khan Durrani Founder and Chairman of Durrani Group, a prominent business conglomerate in Pakistan.
- Faisal Dawood CEO of Dawood Hercules Corporation, one of the largest industrial groups in Pakistan.
- Sirajuddin Aziz CEO of Habib Metropolitan Bank, one of the leading banks in Pakistan.
- Anwar Saifullah Khan is owner of Saif Group Net worth (USD) $5.0 billion (2025)
- Noor Alam Khan Source(s) of wealth Properties, gold mines, real estate and agricultural land. Net worth it (USD) $4.4 billion (2025)
- Malik Riaz is Pakistani Businessman owner of Bahria Town belong to Pashtun Kakazai tribe

== Bureaucrats ==
=== Afghanistan ===
- Habibullah Khan Tarzi, Afghan diplomat and scion of the country's leading political family

=== Pakistan ===
- Jamshed Burki – Interior Secretary of Pakistan
- Ghulam Ishaq Khan - Former President of Pakistan
- Safwat Ghayur – Commandant Frontier Constabulary who embraced martyrdom on Pakistan's War on Terrorism
- Nasir Durrani – Inspector General of Khyber Pakhtunkhwa Police.
- Masood Sharif Khan Khattak – Director-General Intelligence Bureau (Pakistan)
- Salahuddin Khan Mehsud – Chief of Counter Terrorism Department
- Moazzam Jah Ansari – Commandment Frontier Constabulary, IG KPK Police, and IG Balochistan Police
- Muhammad Naeem Khan (inspector general) – Inspector General of Khyber Pakhtunkhwa Police
- Akbar Khan Hoti – Director-General Federal Investigation Agency
- Syed Akhtar Ali Shah – Commandant National Police Academy of Pakistan and Inspector General of Khyber Pakhtunkhwa Police
- Azam Khan – Principal Secretary to the Prime Minister of Pakistan
- Shehzad Khan Bangash – Chief Secretary Khyber Pakhtunkhwa and Federal Secretary of Pakistan
- Shehzad Arbab – Establishment Secretary of Pakistan
- Saeed Wazir – Inspector-General of Gilgit-Baltistan Police
- Aftab Durrani – Interior Secretary of Pakistan
- Dil Jan Khan Marwat – Commandant Frontier Constabulary
- Roedad Khan – Chief Secretary of Khyber Pakhtunkhwa and diplomat played a key role during Cold war
- Rustam Shah Mohmand, Chief Secretary of N.W.F.P, Diplomat, commissioner for Afghan refugees and ambassador of Pakistan to Afghanistan
- Sartaj Aziz – National Security Advisor
- Mahmud Ali Durrani – National Security Advisor
- Amanullah Khan Jadoon, Federal Minister and twice elected MPA of Khyber Pakhtunkhwa
- Asif Durrani – Pakistani diplomat of Foreign Service of Pakistan served as envoy to Iran and Afghanistan
- Shahryar Khan – Foreign Secretary of Pakistan and Chairman Pakistan Cricket Board
- Aziz Ahmad Khan – Pakistani diplomat of Foreign Service of Pakistan served as ambassador to India
- Yusuf Khattak – Pakistani left-wing intellectual Politician, Pakistan Movement Activist, Federal Minister and statesman who represented Pakistan internationally
- Aslam Khattak – Pakistani diplomat and former Governor of Khyber Pakhtunkhwa, served as envoy to Afghanistan
- Mohammed Sadiq – Pakistani diplomat of Foreign Service of Pakistan, served as Special Representative of Pakistan to Afghanistan
- Asad Jahangir - Inspector General of Sindh Police
- Muhammad Naeem Khan - Inspector General of Khyber Pakhtunkhwa Police
- Akhtar Hassan Khan Gorchani - Director-General Intelligence Bureau (Pakistan)
- Abdul Rehman Baitanai - Joint Director State Bank of Pakistan

== Scientists ==
=== Afghanistan ===
- Ghulam Sediq Wardak (Afghanistan) – Pashtun inventor who is known for more than 344 inventions
- Jamal al-Din al-Afghani – one of the founders of Islamic Modernism, as well as an advocate of Pan-Islamic unity in India against the British.
- Zemaryalai Tarzi – Pashtun archeologist
- Daud Shah Saba – Ethnic Afghan (Pashtun) geologist
- Mohammad Qayoumi – 28th president of San Jose State University and 4th president of California State University, East Bay; also a well known engineer by occupation

=== Pakistan ===
- Munir Ahmed Khan (Pakistan) – Chairman of Pakistan Atomic Energy Commission who played a crucial role in Pakistan' Nuclear Programme
- Ziauddin Sardar (Pakistan) – scientist and author of more than 50 books
- Monowar Khan Afridi – Pakistani military general and malariologist and Vice-Chancellor of University of Peshawar

== Film Industry ==
=== India ===
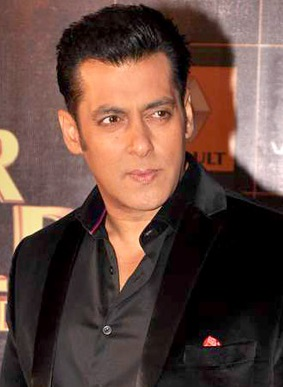
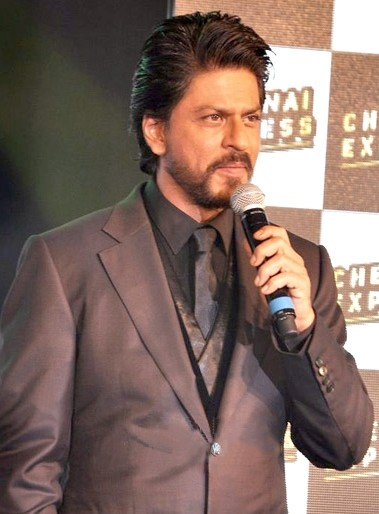
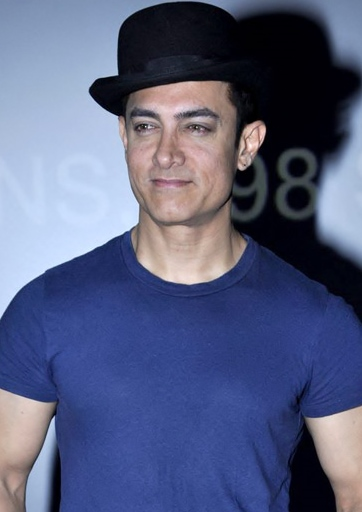
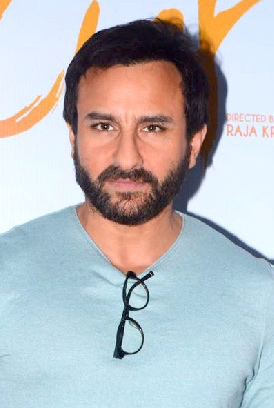
Salman Khan (left), Shah Rukh Khan (center left), Aamir Khan (center right), and Saif Ali Khan (right)
- Madhubala (born Mumtaz Jehan Begum Dehlavi) — Indian actress who starred in over 60 films, including the historical epic Mughal-e-Azam (1960)
- Ataullah Khan – Indian film producer and director
- Shah Rukh Khan - Indian actor and film producer who works in Hindi films, According to Khan his paternal family was an ethnic Pashtun from Peshawar, Khyber Pakhtunkhwa.
- Parveen Babi – Indian actress and model known for being the first Bollywood star to appear on the cover of Time magazine. She hailed from the Babi dynasty.
- Amjad Khan – Indian actor known for his iconic portrayal of the character Gabbar Singh in the film "Sholay." He belonged to a Pashtun family.
- Kader Khan - Indian actor, screenwriter and film producer. He was born in Kabul, Afghanistan and is an ethnic Pashtun of the Kakar tribe.
- Zareen Khan – Indian actress who made her debut in Bollywood. She has Pashtun ancestry from her father's side and originally from Swat
- Aamir Khan – famous Bollywood actor, his family has roots from Herat in Afghanistan, he belongs to the Khan-Hussain family.
- Salman Khan – famous Bollywood actor, he belongs to the Salim Khan family.
- Arbaaz Khan – Indian actor, film producer, and director. He is of Pathan descent and the brother of Salman Khan.
- Saif Ali Khan - actor and film producer who primarily works in Hindi films. He belongs to the Pataudi family.
- Soha Ali Khan – actress of Pataudi Royalty, she is the younger sister of Saif Ali Khan.
- Sara Ali Khan – actress from the Pataudi family, she is the daughter of Saif Ali Khan.
- Irrfan Khan - Indian actor, who belongs to a family of Pathan ancestry.

=== Pakistan ===
- Nazir Ahmed Khan – Nazir Ahmed Khan, renowned director, actor, producer, filmmaker, pioneer and founding father of Pakistan Film Industry post partition. He was also one of the pioneers of the pre-partition Sub Continental Film Industry starting from Calcutta and spanning to Bombay and Lahore.
- Adeeb – Pakistani film actor. He appeared in 38 Indian films from 1940 to 1962, although he did not start performing in films very actively until the 1950s
- Mahira Khan – Pakistani actress known for her roles in Pakistani and Indian films. She has Pashtun ancestry from her father's side.
- Neelam Muneer – Pakistani actress from Mardan
- Fawad Khan – Pakistani actor born into Pashtun family
- Kushhal Khan – Pakistani actor from Nowshera, Descendant of Kushal Baba
- Laila Khan – Pashto singer from Peshawar
- Bilal Abbas Khan – Pakistani actor
- Feroze Khan – Pakistani actor

== Journalists ==
=== Afghanistan ===
- Mina Mangal — journalist, political advisor, and women's rights activist who was killed by gunfire in 2019 in uncertain circumstances.
- Najiba Ayubi – Afghan journalist and women's rights advocate, known for her work in promoting press freedom and advocating for women's rights.
- Sami Yousafzai – Afghan journalist.
- Sana Safi — BBC World Service journalist.
- Ezatullah Zawab is a journalist from Jalalabad, Nangarhar Province, Afghanistan.

=== Pakistan ===
- Rahimullah Yusufzai – Pakistani journalist and expert on Afghan affairs, known for his reporting on the region.
- Saleem Safi – Pakistani journalist, columnist, and television anchor, specializing in political analysis and current affairs.
- Nasim Zehra – Pakistani journalist and television anchor, known for her expertise in political analysis and foreign affairs.
- Asma Shirazi – Pakistani journalist and television anchor, known for her work in political journalism and interviewing prominent figures.
- Iftikhar Ahmad – Pakistani journalist and television anchor, known for his talk show focused on political and social issues.
- Wajahat Saeed Khan – Pakistani journalist, news anchor and defence analyst.

== Politicians ==
=== Afghanistan ===
- Ashraf Ghani Ahmadzai – Afghan former politician, academic, and economist who served as the president of Afghanistan from September 2014 until August 2021, when his government was overthrown by the Taliban.
- Ahmad Wali Karzai, Chairman of Kandahar Provincial Council from 2005 until his assassination in 2011.
- Mohammad Sarwar Ahmedzai, Afghan presidential candidate and deputy national security advisor
- Pacha Gul Wafadar, Afghanistan's Ambassador to Bulgaria under Sirdar Dawood
- Ghulam Hassan Safi, prominent Afghan politician and diplomat in the 1960s
- Suhail Shaheen, prolific writer, editor and Head of the Political Office

=== Pakistan ===
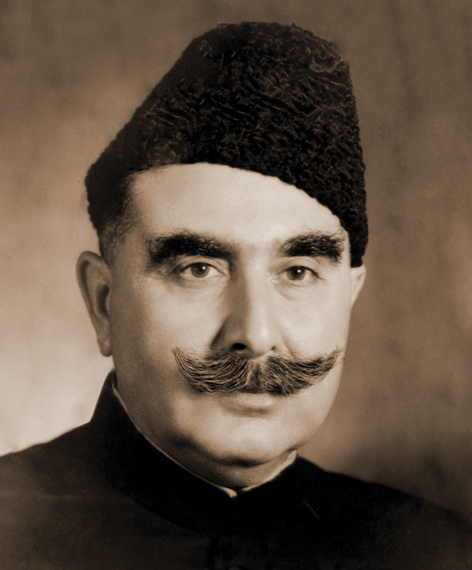
Abdul Rab Nishtar

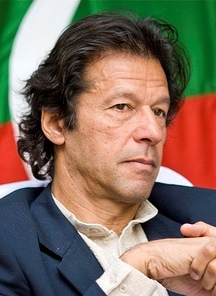
Imran Khan

- Abdur Rab Nishtar, one of the founding fathers of the Pakistan from Peshawar, played a key role during the Pakistan Movement
- Imran Khan, former first-class cricketer, founder of the Pakistan Tehreek-e-Insaf, and 22nd Prime Minister of Pakistan
- Gohar Ali Khan, Pakistani lawyer and politician, Chairman of the Pakistan Tehreek-e-Insaf (PTI) since 2 December 2023
- Zartaj Gul, first woman Climate Minister in the world, hails from Waziristan
- Khan Abdul Hamid Khan, President and Prime Minister of Azad Kashmir
- Masood Khan, President of Azad Kashmir and Permanent Representative of Pakistan to the United Nations.
- Siraj-ul-Haq, 5th Emir of Jamaat-e-Islami and ex-Minister of Finance of Khyber Pakhtunkhwa
- Shehryar Khan Afridi, Federal Interior Minister of Pakistan from Kohat
- Sania Nishtar, prominent Pakistani technocrat, author, doctor and politician from Peshawar served as Federal Minister for the Poverty Alleviation
- Sher Afzal Khan Marwat - Member of the National Assembly of Pakistan since 29 February 2024, prominent representative of Pakistan Tehreek-e-Insaf (PTI)
- Qasim Suri, 19th Deputy Speaker of the National Assembly of Pakistan belongs to the Sur tribe of Quetta
- Pervez Khattak, Federal Defence Minister of Pakistan from Nowshera
- Omar Ayub Khan, Federal Minister of Energy of Pakistan from Haripur
- Murad Saeed, Federal Communication Minister of Pakistan from Swat
- Mufti Abdul Shakoor, Federal Minister for Religious Affairs of Pakistan from Lakki Marwat
- Mirza Muhammad Afridi, Deputy Chairman of Senate of Pakistan
- Khurshid Mahmud Kasuri, Foreign Minister of Pakistan
- Khan Abdul Jabbar Khan, 1st chief minister of West Pakistan
- Habibullah Khan Marwat, 1st chairman of Senate of Pakistan
- Gohar Ayub Khan, 1st speaker of National Assembly of Pakistan from Khyber Pakhtunkhwa
- Ghulam Faruque Khan, Governor of East Pakistan and business tycoon of Pakistan
- Azam Khan Swati, Federal Minister for the Railways of Pakistan from Mardan
- Fazal Ur Rehman, Emir of Jamiat-Ulema-Islam(F) and leader of Pakistan Democratic Movement from Tank
- Mufti Asad Mehmood, Federal Communication Minister of Pakistan and Deputy leader of JUIF
- Ali Muhammad Khan, Federal Parliamentary Minister of Pakistan from Mardan
- Akram Khan Durrani, former Chief Minister of Khyber Pakhtunkhwa and Ex Federal Minister for Housing and Works from Bannu
- Ali Amin Gandapur, Federal Minister for Kashmir Affairs of Pakistan from Dera Islmail Khan
- Aimal Wali Khan, President of Pakistan's Awami National Party
- Abdul Haq Akorwi (Pakistan), Prominent political leader, Mujahid during Soviet Afghan war and a teacher from Akora Khattak
- Abdul Majeed Khan Achakzai (Pakistan), Member of the Provincial Assembly of Balochistan
- Abdul Samad Khan Achakzai (Pakistan), freedom fighter and one of the well known politician from Balochistan
- Khalilur Rehman, Deputy Chairman of Senate
- Daud Khan Achakzai (Pakistan), chairperson of senate committee on communication and member of Senate Committee on Information, Broadcasting and National Heritage, Law and Justice, Defence Production, Select Committee from Awami National Party (ANP)
- Hamid Khan Achakzai, Pakistani politician from Balochistan affiliated with the Pakhtunkhwa Milli Awami Party
- Mahmood Khan Achakzai, Pakistani Pashtun regionalist politician who is the Chairman of Pashtunkhwa Milli Awami Party
- Ameer Muqam, President of PMLN Khyber-Pakhtunkhwa advisor to the Prime Minister of Pakistan
- Muhammad Khan Achakzai, Pakistani politician who served as the 23rd Governor of Balochistan
- Noor Jehan Panezai, first woman Deputy Chairman of Senate of Pakistan
- Afzal Bangash, Marxist politician, activist and co-founder of the Mazdoor Kisan Party (MKP)
- Abdul Aziz Khan Kaka, member of the Khudai Khidmatgar Movement from Zaida Kallay, Swabi who defeated the Imperial Crown's Political Agent, Sir Sahibzada Abdul Qayyum Khan in the elections of 1936 and following the inception of Pakistan he spent a total 21 years of imprisonment for "political crimes" and eventually joined the National Awami Party where he was elected in 1970 to the provincial legislature as a representative of the NAP
- Sardar Abd-ur Rashid Khan, Member of Pakistan Muslim League, Chief Minister of North-Western Province
- Sardar Bahadur Khan, Member of Pakistan Muslim League Chief Minister of North-Western Province
- Mufti Mehmood, Emir of Jamat Ulema-e-Islam and Chief Minister of North-Western Province.
- Sardar Inayatullah Khan Gandapur – Chief of Gandapur tribe, prominent member of Pakistan People's Party served as Chief Minister of Khyber-Pakhtunkhwa, Federal Minister of Finance
- Nasrullah Khan Khattak, Chief Minister of Khyber-Pakhtunkhwa
- Aftab Khan Sherpao, Chairman Quami Watan Party, Federal Minister of Interior of Pakistan
- Ameer Haider Khan Hoti, Chief Minister of Khyber-Pakhtunkhwa
- Gul Muhammad Khan Jogezai, Governor of Balochistan
- Miangul Aurangzeb, Governor of Khyber-Pakhtunkhwa
- Syed Fazal Agha, 19th Deputy Chairman of Senate
- Owais Ahmed Ghani, Federal Minister of Climate
- Amanullah Khan Yasinzai, Governor of Balochistan
- Kamran Khan Bangash, Pakistani politician served as Provincial Minister for Higher Education Khyber-Pakhtunkhwa
- Shahram Khan, Provincial Minister of Local Government
- Shah Farman, Governor Khyber-Pakhtunkhwa
- Hisham Inamullah Khan, Provincial Minister of Health
- Atif Khan, Provincial Minister of Tourism
- Ziaullah Bangash, Provincial Minister of Primary Education
- Akbar Ayub Khan, Provincial Minister of Works
- Muhibullah Khan, Provincial Minister of Agriculture
- Qalandar Khan Lodhi, Provincial Minister of Food
- Arshad Ayub Khan, Provincial Minister of Local Government and Rural Development
- Fazal Hakim Khan, Provincial Minister of Climate Change
- Shakeel Ahmad, Provincial Minister of Communication and Works
- Muhammad Adnan Qadri, Provincial Minister of Religious Affairs
- Aftab Alam Khan Afridi, Provincial Minister of Law and Parliamentary Affairs
- Aqib Ullah Khan, Provincial Minister of Irrigation
- Khaliq Ur Rehman Khattak, Provincial Minister of Excise, Taxation and Narcotics Control
- Nazir Ahmed Abbasi, Provincial Minister of Revenue
- Syed Qasim Ali Shah, Provincial Minister of Health
- Pashtoon Yar Khan, Provincial Minister of Public Health Engineering
- Meena Khan, Provincial Minister of Higher Education
- Faisal Khan Tarakai, Provincial Minister of Elementary & Secondary Education
- Muhammad Sajjad, Provincial Minister of Agriculture
- Fazal Shakoor, Provincial Minister of Labour
- Muhammad Zahir Shah, Provincial Minister of Food
- Amjad Ali, Provincial Minister of Mines and Minerals
- Syed Muhammad Ishtiaq, Provincial Minister of Environment
- Amjad Ali Khan Niazi, Chairman Standing Parliamentary Committee for Defence
- Mirza Muhammad Afridi, Deputy Chairman of Senate
- Shandana Gulzar, first woman of Khyber-Pakhtunwa elected on general seat of National Assembly
- Salim Saifullah Khan, Pakistani politician and former senator
- Israr Tareen - Federal Minister of Defence Production of Pakistan.
- Sajid Hussain Turi - Federal Minister for Overseas Pakistanis and Human resources and development
- Mashal Yousufzai - Advisor in the Provincial Cabinet of Khyber Pakhtunkhwa

== Presidents ==
=== India ===
- Zakir Husain – Afridi Descent Governor of Bihar from 1957 to 1962 and was elected the Vice President of India in 1962. Husain was the first Muslim and the first governor of a state to be elected President of India.

=== Pakistan ===
- Ayub Khan (1907–1974) – Pakistani military commander who served as President of Pakistan from 1958 to 1969.
- Yahya Khan (4 February 1917 – 10 August 1980) was a Pakistani military officer who served as the third president of Pakistan from 1969 to 1971.
- Ghulam Ishaq Khan, (20 January 1915 – 27 October 2006), was a Pakistani politician who served as the seventh president of Pakistan from 1988 to 1993.
- Malik Ghulam Muhammad, third Governor-General of Pakistan, a kakazai pashtun.

=== Afghanistan ===
- Mohammad Daoud Khan – served as the first President of Afghanistan from 1973 to 1978.
- Nur Muhammad Khan Taraki – Served as the second President of Afghanistan from 1978 to 1979.
- Hafizullah Amin – He remained the 3rd head of state of Afghanistan from Sept 1979 to Dec 1979, H. organized their communist Revolution in 1978.
- Babrak Karmal – He served as the Head of state from 1979 to 1986 from People's Democratic Party.
- Haji Muhammad Khan Tsamkani – He served as the Head of state from 1986 to 1987.
- Mohammad Najibullah Ahmadzai – He served as the communist Head of state from 1987 to 1992.
- Abdul Rahim Hatif – After the assassination of Dr Najibullah, He acted as the president of Afghanistan for 2 weeks.

== Military ==
=== Afghanistan Forces ===
- Ghazi Mir Zaman Khan, War Hero of the 1919 Anglo Afghan War
- Ghulam Haidar Rasuli, Afghan officer martyred in the 1978 coup d'état
- Abdullah Khan Tarzi, Afghan statesman who served as a soldier in the War of Independence
- Abdul Raziq Achakzai – former lieutenant commander of Afghan armed forces
- Mohammad Akram – vice Chief of Staff of the Afghan National Army.
- Sardar Shah Wali Khan – Afghanistan's Field Marshal who was a political and military figure.
- Abdul Jabar Qahraman, Military Officer and politician under The Democratic Republic of Afghanistan and later The Islamic Republic of Afghanistan.
- Khoshal Sadat, Deputy Interior Minister for Security under The Islamic Republic of Afghanistan.
- Sami Sadat, Lieutenant General of Afghanistan under Hamid Karzai and Ashraf Ghani.
- Obaidullah Akhund – Defense Minister of Afghanistan from 1996 to 2001.
- Dadullah – Afghan Taliban senior Military commander until his death 2007.
- Abdul Qadir – Military Higher officer in Afghanistan Air Force.

=== Pakistan Armed Forces ===
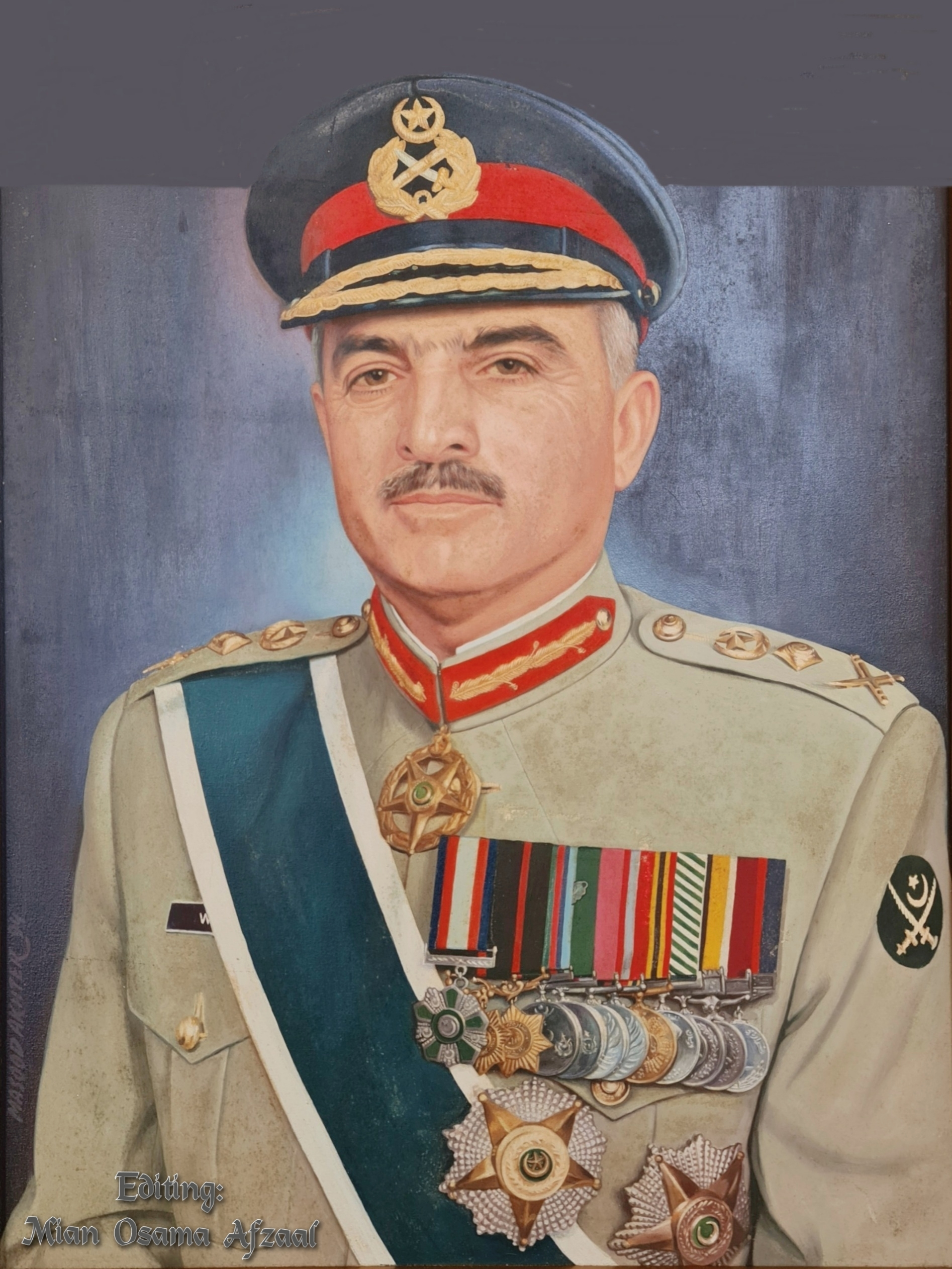
Abdul Waheed Kakar, Army Chief of Pakistan in the 1990s from the Kakar tribe.

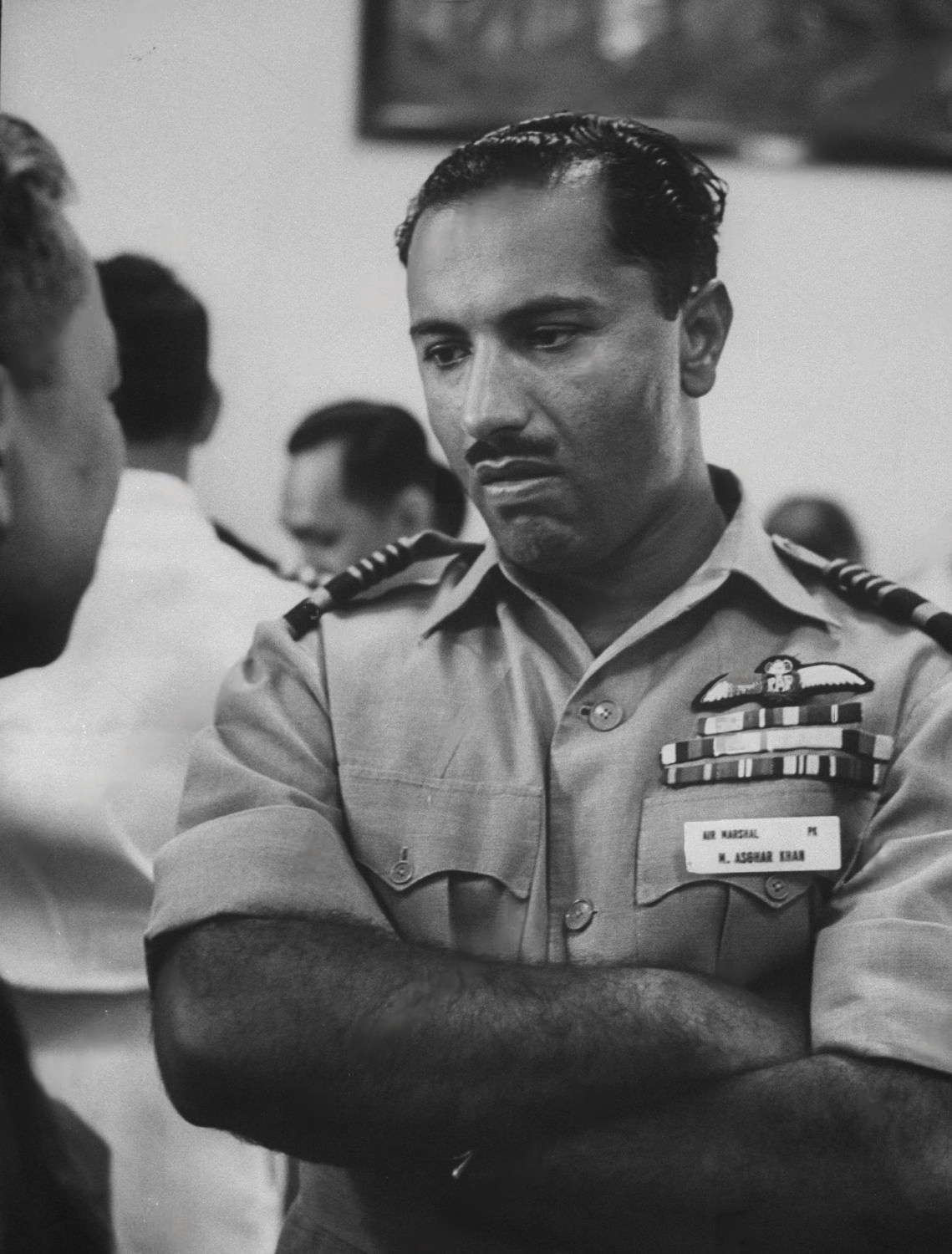
Air Marshal Asghar Khan, first native Commander-in-Chief of the Pakistan Air Force, politician, and author was from the Afridi tribe of Pashtuns.

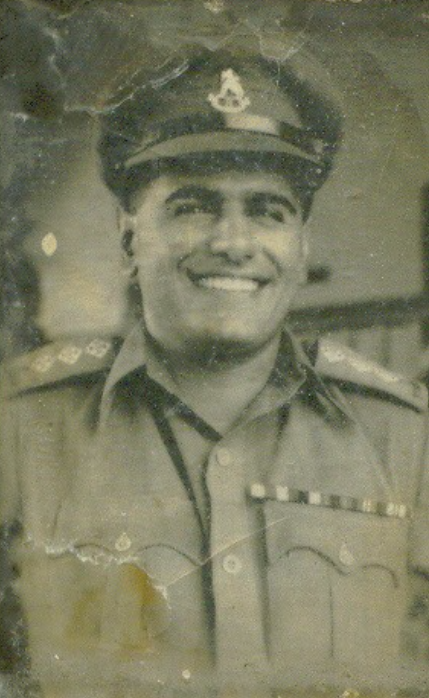
Major Aslam Khan captured the Kennedy Peak (Myanmar) in World War II and played a key role in the merger of Gilgit-Baltistan into Pakistan, was from the Afridi tribe and elder brother of Asghar Khan.

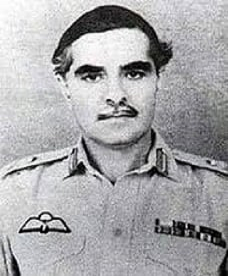
General Gul Hassan Khan, 10th Chief of General Staff and last C-in-C of the Pakistan Army

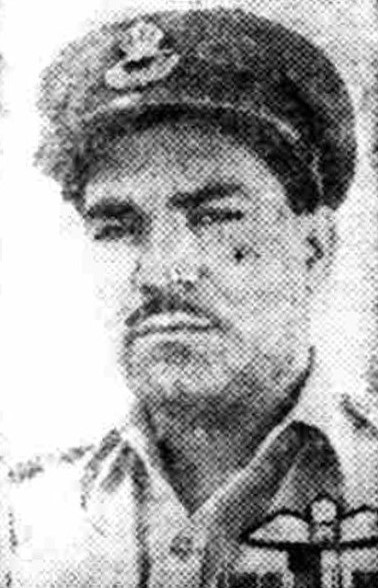
AVM Khyber Khan, former Deputy Chief of Air Staff of the PAF and diplomat

- Field Marshal Ayub Khan – 2nd President of Pakistan and First Commander-in-Chief of the Pakistan Army from Haripur.
- Yahya Khan – President of Pakistan and Commander-in-Chief.
- Gul Hassan Khan – Commander-in-Chief of Pakistan Army from Quetta.
- Wajid Ali Khan Burki – Pioneer of the Pakistan Army Medical Corps.
- Azam Khan – First commander of the Pakistan Army's I Corps, key Minister of Ayub's martial law cabinet, and served as the Governor of East Pakistan.
- Abdul Waheed Kakar – Chief of Army Staff from Pakistan Army.
- Farooq Feroze Khan – Chief of Air Staff of Pakistan Air Force.
- Jehangir Karamat – Chief of Army Staff, Kakazai Pashtun of Punjab.
- Asghar Khan – First native Commander-in-Chief of the Pakistan Air Force
- Khyber Khan – former Deputy Chief of Air Staff of the PAF and diplomat
- Hakimullah Khan Durrani – Chief of Air Staff of the Pakistan Air Force
- Karamat Rahman Niazi – Chief of Naval Staff of Pakistan Navy
- Abbas Khattak – Chief of Air Staff of Pakistan Air Force.
- Anwar Shamim – Chief of Air Staff of Pakistan Air Force.
- Amjad Khan Niazi - Chief of Naval Staff of Pakistan Navy
- Jamal A. Khan Afridi – Chief of Air Staff of the Pakistan Air Force
- General Ehsan ul Haq – Chairman Joint Chiefs of Staff Committee and DG ISI.
- Aziz Khan – Chairman Joint Chiefs of Staff Committee of Pakistan Armed Forces.
- Akhtar Abdur Rahman – Chairman Joint Chiefs of Staff Committee and DG ISI.
- Sher Ali Khan Pataudi – Chief of General Staff of the Pakistan Army.
- Sahabzada Yaqub Khan – Chief of General Staff of the Pakistan Army.
- Ali Kuli Khan Khattak – Chief of General of Staff of the Pakistan Army.
- Akbar Khan – 1st Chief of General Staff of the Pakistan Army, played a key role in the liberation of Azad Kashmir during first Indo-Pakistani War of 1947–1948.
- Farrakh Khan – Chief of General of Staff of the Pakistan Army.
- Mian Hayaud Din – Chief of General Staff of the Pakistan Army.
- A. A. K. Niazi – Commander of Eastern Military High Command during the 1971 Indo-Pak War.
- Ghulam Jilani Khan - Lt. General of the Pakistan Army, later served as the Director-General of the ISI and the Governor of Punjab.
- Zia Ullah Khan - Lt. General of the Pakistan Army, recipient of the Hilal-i-Imtiaz.
- Nigar Johar– first female three-star Lt. General of Pakistan Army, served as first female Surgeon General of Pakistan Armed Forces from Swabi.
- Shuja Khanzada – Pakistan Army officer who fought in the War of '71 and Siachen conflict, martyred in a suicide blast at Attock
- Aslam Khan Afridi – Brigadier of the Pakistan Army who played a prominent role in the merger of Gilgit-Baltistan into Pakistan.
- Habibullah Khan Khattak – Pakistan Army general and former British Indian Army officer of the Burma campaign during the Second World War
- Fazle Haq – Corps Commander Pakistan Army and Governor of Khyber Pakhtunkhwa.
- Alam Khattak – Commander Southern Command Pakistan Army.
- Obaidullah Khan Khattak -– Commander Army Strategic Forces Command.
- Ali Jan Aurakzai – Corps Commander Pakistan Army from Orakzai
- Muhammad Arif Bangash – Corps Commander Pakistan Army from Hangu.
- Asad Durrani – Pashtun of Durrani tribe who served as chief of Pakistan's premier intelligence agency ISI.
- Hamid Gul – Chief of Inter-Services Intelligence of Pakistan who played key role in birth of Afghan Mujahideen
- Imran Ullah Khan – Corps Commander X Corps and Governor of Balochistan.
- Karnal Sher Khan – Pakistani military captain and recipient of Nishan-e-Haider for his role in the Kargil War, one of the only eleven holders of the highest military award.
- Khushdil Khan – Corps Commander Pakistan Army and Governor of Balochistan
- Major Amir – ISI official who played a pivotal role in Afghan affairs of the ISI.
- Naseerullah Babar – Interior Minister of Pakistan and IG Frontier Corps.
- Tariq Khan – Comman der Central Command Pakistan Army.
- Jahan Dad Khan – Corps Commander and Governor of Sindh.
- Mohammad Shafiq – Corps Commander Bahawalpur and Governor of Khyber Pakhtunkhwa.
- Sanaullah Khan Niazi – Major General of the Pakistan Army.
- Bilal Omer Khan – Major General of the Pakistan Army.
- Monowar Khan Afridi – Brigadier of the Pakistan Army, who was founder of the modern health and medical education system in Pakistan and vice-chancellor of the Peshawar University
- Roohullah Mohmand – was an officer in the Pakistan Army's Special Services Group (SSG) who was posthumously awarded the Tamgha-i-Jurat for his bravery during a terrorist attack on the Police Training College, Quetta.
- Shaheen Mazhar Mehmood – Corps Commander XI Corps and I Corps Pakistan Army from Karak.
- Shakir Ullah Khattak – Lieutenant General of the Pakistan Army who is serving as the Chairman of Heavy Industries Taxila.
- Hassan Khattak – Lieutenant General in the Pakistan Army, currently serving as the Quartermaster General (QMG) at the General Headquarters (GHQ).
- Mumtaz Hussain – Major-general in the Pakistan Army served as the General Officer Commanding (GOC)Special Services Group (SSG).
- Shifaat Ali Khan – Rear admiral of the Pakistan Navy serving at Naval Headquarters(NHQ).
- Alam Jan Mehsud – Lieutenant General of the Pakistan Army hailing from Waziristan, served as the Corps Commander IV Corps and IG Frontier Corps.

== Royalty ==
=== Khalji Empire (1290-1320) ===
- Khilji dynasty was the second dynasty which ruled the Delhi Sultanate, covering large parts of India for nearly three decades between 1290 and 1320. It was founded by Jalal-ud-din Firuz Khalji
- Alauddin Khilji, renowned military commander and Emperor of Hindustan

=== Durrani Empire (1747-1823) ===
- Ahmad Shah Abdali – Founder of Durrani Empire and former ruler of Afghanistan, India, Pakistan, Iran and some parts of Tajikistan, Uzbekistan and Turkmenistan.
- Timur Shah Durrani – Second Ruler of Durrani Empire and Former ruler of Afghanistan and Punjab Region.
- Zaman Shah Durrani – Third Ruler of Durrani Empire.

=== Hotak Empire ===
- Mirwais Khan Hotak – Founder of Hotak Empire. Also known as the "Emir Of Greater Afghanistan".
- Abdul Aziz Hotak – Second Ruler of Hotak Empire.
- Mahmud Hotak – Third ruler of Hotak Empire. He was known as the Shah of Iran.
- Ashraf Hotak – Fourth Ruler of Hotak Empire. Also known as the Shah of Iran. He defeated the Ottoman Empire in the Ottoman Hotak War.
- Hussain Hotak – Fifth and last ruler of Hotak Dynasty,

=== Lodi Empire ===
- Bahlul Lodi – The founder and first emperor of the Lodi Empire
- Sikandar Khan Lodi – Second Emperor of the Lodi Sultanate
- Ibrahim Lodi – Third and Last Monarch of the Lodi dynasty

=== Barakzai Dynasty ===
- Sultan Mohammad Khan – Was the brother of Dost Muhammad Khan and First Afghan ruler of Barakzai Dynasty.
- Dost Muhammad Khan – Was the founder of Barakzai Dynasty and remained one of the prominent ruler of Afghanistan During The first Anglo Afghan War
- Wazir Akbar Khan (1842–1843) – was ruler and prominent part of the First Anglo Afghan War delivering a crushing defeat to the British Empire and its Raj subjects
- Sher Ali Khan – Emir of Afghanistan (1863–1866)

=== Sur Empire ===
- Sher Shah Suri – The founder and first monarch of Sur Empire
- Islam Shah Suri – Second Emperor of Sur Empire
- Firuz Shah Suri – Third Emperor of Sur Empire
- Muhammad Adil Shah – 4th Emperor of Sur Empire
- Ibrahim Shah Suri – 5th Emperor of Sur Empire
- Sikandar Shah Suri – 6th Emperor of Sur Empire
- Adil Shah Suri – 7th and last emperor of Sur Empire

=== Pakhtunkhawa State (Yusufzai) (1520-1620) ===
- Malak Ahmad Khan Yusufzai, The founder of and first ruler of Pakhtunkhawa State.
- Gaju Khan Baba, was the Second Ruler of Pakhtunkhawa State.
- Malak Misri Khan Yusufzai, was the Third Ruler of Pakhtunkhawa State.
- Malak Ghazi Khan Yusufzai, was the Fourth ruler of Pakhtunkhawa State.
- Kalu Khan Yousafzai, was the 5th Ruler of Pakhtunkhawa State.
- Bahaku Khan Yusufzai, was the Last Ruler of Pakhtunkhawa State.

=== Bangash Dynasty ===
- Muhammad Ghazanfar-Jang Bangash Khan, Nawab of Farrukhabad, Allahabad and Malwa
- Ahmad Khan Bangash, Nawab of Farrukhabad who commanded a division of the Afghan army in the Third Battle of Panipat

=== Babi Dynasty ===
- Sher Khan Babi, was the founder of Babi Dynasty

== Revolutionaries ==
- Darya Khan Afridi, an early fighter of Pashtun Self-Governance, annihilated the Mughal Army at the Khyber Pass.
- Aimal Khan Mohmand, Pashtun Warrior who declared Jehād against the Mughal Empire leading the great Afghan Revolts killing prominent commanders of the Mughal Force
- Abdul Samad Khan Achakzai (7 July 1907 – 2 December 1973) (Pashto: عبدالصمد خان اڅکزی), commonly known as Khan Shaheed (خان شهيد) was a Pashtun nationalist and political idealist. Abdul Samad Khan spent half his life in prisons in British India and Pakistan. Khan Shaheed gave the idea of Pashtunistan.
- Nur Muhammad Tarakai, Afghan communist revolutionary who served as President of the Marxist–Leninist Democratic Republic of Afghanistan and led the Saur Revolution on the 28th of April, 1978
- Hafizullah Amin, Afghan communist revolutionary who organised the Saur Revolution serving as General Secretary of the People's Democratic Party of Afghanistan
- Nisar Muhammad Yousafzai, a War Hero of the Afghan War of Independence, recipient of the Order of Gallantry of the Emirate of Afghanistan, escaped the subsequent British Death Sentence after the occupation of his hometown Swabi and fled to Turkestan to join the Bolshevik Party
- Abdul Ghaffar Khan, Independence freedom fighter of the British Raj and proponent of the Pashtunistan movement
- Sartōr Faqīr, Pashtun tribal rebel leader who led a valiant stand of various Afghan tribes against the British Empire at Malakand
- Faqir of Ipi, Chieftain of Waziristan who fought for the Pashtunistan struggle against the British Raj and its 40,000 British Indian soldiers and continued a guerilla struggle against the succeeding state of Pakistan
- Kushal Khān Khaṭak, National Poet of Afghanistan who rallied the tribes of Pakhtunkhwa against the Mughal Empire of Aurangzeb
- Ghazi Umra Khan of Jandul, also known as the Afghan Napoleon conquered northern Pakhtunkhwa, battling the British Empire in the Chitral Expedition and taking British soldiers as Prisoner of War
- Meena Keshwar Kamal, Afghan political activist who headed the Revolutionary Association
- Azimullah Khan Yusufzai; Man behind the Indian War of Independence, was the ideological leader of the Great Revolt of 1857 who planted the seeds for revolution against the British East India Company
- Mir Mast Afridi, (Mujahid-i-Millat) Pashtun soldier who defected the Imperial army and joined the Ottoman cause from the frontier

== Assassins ==
- Mir Aimal Kasi, assassinated two employees of the Central Intelligence Agency (CIA) at the agency's vast complex in Langley, Virginia seeking to avenge American attacks on Iraq and US policy towards occupied Palestinian territories and Afghanistan
- Sayyid Akbar Babrak, assassinated Pakistan's first prime minister Liaquat Ali Khan for unknown reasons
- Sher Ali Afridi, assassinated the Viceroy of British-occupied India

== Sport Persons ==
=== Afghanistan ===
- Rashid Khan – Afghan cricketer and one of the best spin bowlers in the world. He has achieved great success in international cricket. Khan has taken 176 wickets in the international matches under the age of 20 and thus got his name in the Guinness World Records. From Nangarhar Province
- Hamid Hassan – Former Afghan cricketer who played as a fast bowler and represented Afghanistan in international matches. From Nangarhar Province
- Javid Basharat – Afghan-born mixed martial artist who competes in the Bantamweight division for the Ultimate Fighting Championship (UFC).
- Nasrat Haqparast Haqparast was born in Germany to Afghan parents from Kandahar who came as refugees from Afghanistan. He is mixed martial artist (MMA) who currently competes in the Lightweight division of the UFC.
- Khaibar Amani – Professional footballer who plays as a midfielder and has represented Afghanistan internationally.
- Rokhan Barakzai, Afghan cricketer
- Zahir Shah – Afghan taekwondo athlete who represented Afghanistan at the 2016 Summer Olympics.
- Abdul Ghafoor Yusufzai, Afghan footballer representing the Kingdom of Afghanistan in the 1948 Summer Olympics
- Mohammad Sarwar Yousafzai, Afghan footballer, competed in the 1948 Summer Olympic Games
- Yar Mohammad Barakzai, member of Afghan national football team
- Mohamed Ibrahim Gharzai, Afghan Olympic football player
- Hamidullah Yousafzai, Afghan football player who played for Afghanistan national football team
- Hashmatullah Barakzai, Afghan football player who played for Afghanistan national football team
- Fazalhaq Farooqi (born 22 September 2000) is an Afghan international cricketer who plays Afghanistan cricket team for the in all formats of the game. From Baghlan Province
- Rahmanullah (Pashto: رحمان الله ګربز; born 28 November 2001) is an Afghan cricketer. He made his international debut for Afghanistan in September 2019.
- Mohammad Nabi Essakhail is an Afghan cricketer and former captain of the Afghanistan national cricket team. Nabi is an attacking batting all-rounder, playing as a right-handed batsman and off-break bowler.
- Mujeeb Ur Rahman is an Afghan cricketer, who plays for the Afghanistan national cricket team. Two months after his international debut, at the age of 16 years and 325 days, he became the youngest player to take a five-wicket haul in a One Day International.
- Noor Ahmad (born 3 January 2005) is an Afghan cricketer, who made his international debut for the national cricket team in June 2022.
- Nadia Nadim Afghan-Danish a professional footballer who plays as a striker for the Damallsvenskan club Hammarby.

=== Pakistan ===
- Shahid Afridi – Former Pakistani cricketer and one of the most popular and successful all-rounders in the game.
- Imran Khan – Former Pakistani cricketer, legendary fast bowler, and the former Prime Minister of Pakistan.
- Younis Khan – Former Pakistani cricketer and one of the leading run-scorers in Test cricket history.
- Zubair Ahmed – Former Pakistani field hockey player who won a gold medal at the 1984 Summer Olympics.
- Samiullah Khan – Former Pakistani field hockey player who won three gold medals at the Olympics and is considered one of the greatest field hockey players of all time.
- Jahangir Khan – Former Pakistani squash player, considered one of the greatest players in the sport's history.
- Zaman Khan, Pakistani international cricketer from South Waziristan.
- Abrar Ahmed, Pakistani cricketer from Mansehra who became Pakistani bowler to take a 5-wicket haul in the first session on Test debut.
- Junaid Khan, Pakistani international cricketer.
- Yasir Shah, Pakistani cricketer and leg-spinner from Swabi.
- Shaheen Afridi, Pakistani international cricketer from Khyber.
- Qazi Mohib, Former Olympian and Ex Captain Pakistan Hockey Team from Bannu
- Naseem Shah, Pakistani cricketer and fast bowler from Dir.
- Mohammad Wasim Jr, Pakistani cricketer and fast bowler from Waziristan.
- Muhammad Rizwan, Pakistani cricketer and batsman from Peshawar.
- Mohammad Haris, Pakistani cricketer and batsman from Peshawar.
- Khushdil Shah, Pakistani cricketer from Bannu.
- Jansher Khan, Pakistani squash player.
- Iftikhar Ahmed, Pakistani cricketer and all rounder from Peshawar.
- Haris Rauf, Pakistani cricketer and fast bowler from Mansehra
- Fakhar Zaman, Pakistani cricketer from Mardan
- Mir Azam, first-class cricketer of Swabi in the Abbottabad team, also known as the falcons
- Umar Gul- Pakistani international cricketer from Peshawar.
- Wajahatullah Wasti- Pakistani international cricketer from Peshawar.
- Saim Ayub, Pakistani international cricketer
- Shan Masood Khan, Pakistani international cricketer
- Ihsanullah, Pakistani international cricketer and fast bowler from Swat
- Javed Burki, Former legendary Pakistani test cricketer.
- Usman Shinwari, Pakistani international cricketer and fast bowler from Khyber.
- Majid Khan, Former Pakistani international cricketer, batsman and captain of the Pakistan national cricket team.
- Sharmeen Khan, Pioneer of Pakistan's Women cricket
- Hashim Khan, A Pakistani Squash player
- Maria Toorpakai Wazir, the first tribal Pakistani girl in international squash tournaments
- Khan squash family, refers to a Pakistani family that has produced a succession of champion squash players from Khyber-Pakhtunkhwa.
- Noreena Shams, A professional squash player from Timergara
- Abbas Afridi, A professional Pakistani international cricketer from Khyber.
- Zakir Khan, A professional Pakistani international cricketer
- Asad Jahangir Khan, A professional Pakistani international cricketer
- Maazullah Khan, A professional Pakistani international test cricketer
- India
- Irfan Pathan Indian Cricketer.
- Yusuf Pathan Indian Cricketer.
- Mansoor Ali Khan Pataudi Former Indian Cricketer 1941-2011.
- Iftikhar Ali Khan Pataudi was an Indian prince and cricket player.
- Salim Durani was an Afghan-born Indian cricketer.
- Abdul Aziz Durrani Afghan-born Indian cricketer.
- Feroze Khan (field hockey) Feroze Khan was a gold medalist for India at the 1928 Summer Olympics. He was a Pathan from Jalandhar, and migrated to Pakistan in the early 1950s.Ahmed Sher Khan became a gold medalist for India at the 1936 Summer Olympics, while his son Aslam Sher Khan was a member of the Indian squad which won the 1975 Men's Hockey World Cup. They were Pathans from Bhopal.
- Ahmed Sher Khan was an Indian Field hockey player.
- Aslam Sher Khan is an Indian hockey player and a former member of the Indian team.
- Ghaus Mohammad was the first Indian tennis player to qualify for Wimbledon quarter-finals, in 1939. He was an Afridi Pathan from Malihabad.

== Singers ==
=== Afghanistan ===
- Ahmad Zahir Pashtun singer from Laghman Province .
- Latif Nangarhari Pashto Singer from Nangarhar Province.
- Naghma is an Afghan singer who started her career in the early 1980s.
- Farhad Darya Pashtun artist, producer, and singer from Afghanistan.
- Aryana Sayeed Pashtun singer from Kabul province.

=== Pakistan ===
- Gul Panra – Pashto Singer from Swat.
- Haroon Bacha – Pashto Folk singer.
- Rahim Shah – Pashto singer, born in Karachi.
- Junaid Jamshed, was a Pakistani singer-songwriter, television personality, fashion designer, actor, engineer, and preacher. Junaid Jamshed was born in a Khattak Pathan family in Karachi.
- Sardar Ali Takkar – Pashto singer, born in Takkar village Mardan is a Pakistani Pashto singer
- Gulzar Alam – is a famous Pashto folk and Ghazal singer, musician, and composer.

== Jurists ==
=== Afghanistan ===
- Fazal Hadi Shinwari, Chief Justice of Afghanistan

=== Pakistan ===
- Yahya Afridi – 30th and the Current Chief Justice of Pakistan.
- Nasirul Mulk – 22nd Chief Justice of Pakistan.
- Bashir Jehangiri – Chief Justice of Pakistan.
- Jamal Khan Mandokhail – Justice of Supreme Court of Pakistan and Chief Justice of Balochistan High Court.
- Mian Shakirullah Jan – Justice of Supreme Court of Pakistan.
- Tariq Pervez Khan – Justice of Supreme Court of Pakistan and Chief Justice of Peshawar High Court
- Dost Mohammad Khan – Justice of Supreme Court of Pakistan and Chief Justice of Peshawar High Court
- Mazhar Alam Miankhel – Justice of Supreme Court of Pakistan and Chief Justice of Peshawar High Court.
- Musarrat Hilali – Second female Justice in the history Supreme Court of Pakistan.
- Athar Minallah – Chief Justice of Islamabad High Court.
- Naeem Akhtar Afghan – Chief Justice of Balochistan High Court.
- Muhammad Hashim Kakar – Chief Justice of Balochistan High Court.
- Muhammad Kamran Khan Mulakhail – Chief Justice of Balochistan High Court.
- Amanullah Khan Yasinzai – Chief Justice of Balochistan High Court
- Muhammad Ibrahim Khan – Chief Justice of Peshawar High Court
- Shah Nawaz Khan (judge) – Chief Justice of Peshawar High Court
- Syed Usman Ali Shah – Chief Justice of Peshawar High Court
- Muhammad Raza Khan – Chief Justice of Peshawar High Court
- Qaiser Rashid Khan – Chief Justice of Peshawar High Court
- Tariq Mehmood Jahangiri – Justice of Islamabad High Court
- Miangul Hassan Aurangzeb – Justice of Islamabad High Court
