= Mumtaz =

- Pronunciation: [mumtɑz], [momtɑz]
- Language: Arabic

Origin
- Meaning: "excellent", "the distinguished" or "the best"

Other names
- Variant form: Momtaz

Mumtaz, Momtaz, Mamtaz, or Mümtaz (Arabic: ممتاز) is a unisex given name of Arabic origin. It means "excellent" in Arabic. It may be used to signal commendation for an achievement, similar in meaning to bravo and kudos. Derived from it is a personal name commonly used in various countries in the Muslim world, mainly Afghanistan, Brunei, Malaysia, Pakistan, Bangladesh, India, and Turkey. Mumtazah is a related female version. Notable people with the name include:

== Given name ==
=== Mamtaz ===
- Mamtaz Begum, Bangladeshi politician
- Mamtaz Sanghamita (1946–2026), Indian gynaecologist and politician

=== Momtaz ===
- Momtaz Begum (born 1961), Bangladeshi folk singer and politician
- Momtaz Begum (professor) (died 2020), Bangladeshi politician
- Momtaz Begum-Hossain (born 1981), English freelance journalist, craft expert, and presenter
- Momtaz Kabir, Bangladeshi politician
- Momtaz El-Saeed (born 1948), Egyptian politician
- Momtazur Rahman Tarafdar (1928–1997), Bangladeshi historian and academic

=== Mumtaz ===
- Mumtaz (Indian actress) (born 1947), Indian film actress
- Mumtaz (Pakistani actress) (born 1948), Pakistani film actress
- Mumtaz Ahmad, Pakistani politician
- Mumtaz Ahmed (born 1970), Pakistani swimmer
- Mumtaz Khan Akbar (born 1959), Pakistani businessman
- Mumtaz Akhtar (born 1988), Indian footballer
- Mumtaz Ali (1902–1975), Indian dancer and character actor
- Mumtaz Ansari (born 1947), Indian politician
- Mumtaz Zahra Baloch, Pakistani diplomat
- Momtaz Begum (born 1974), Bangladeshi folk singer
- Mumtaz Begum (activist) (1923–1967), Bangladeshi activist
- Mumtaz Begum (actress) (1923–2002), Indian film actress
- Mumtaz Begum (Indian politician), Indian politician
- Mumtaz Begum (mayor) (born 1956), Indian politician
- Mumtaz Begum (Pakistani politician), Pakistani politician
- Mumtaz Bhutto (1933–2021), Pakistani politician
- Mumtaz Ali Chandio, Pakistani politician
- Mumtaz Ali Khan Chang, Pakistani politician
- Mumtaz Daultana (1916–1995), Pakistani politician and independence activist
- Mumtaz Dughmush, Palestinian militant
- Mumtaz Habib (born 1987), Afghan cricketer
- Mumtaz Hasan (1907–1974), Pakistani poet and literary scholar
- Mumtaz Hussain (cricketer) (1947–2000), Indian cricketer
- Mumtaz Hussain (filmmaker) (born 1954), Pakistani-American filmmaker, painter, graphic designer, and writer
- Mumtaz Hussain (general), Pakistani Army general
- Mumtaz Hussain (solicitor), English solicitor and radio presenter
- Mumtaz Jajja (1948–2011), Pakistani politician
- Mumtaz Hussain Khan Jakhrani (born 1973), Pakistani politician
- Mumtaz Kahloon (born 1956), Pakistani businessman and politician
- Mumtaz Ali Kazi (1928–1999), Pakistani scientist and educator
- Mumtaz M. Kazi, Indian train engineer
- Mumtaz Khan (field hockey) (born 2003), Indian field hockey player
- Mumtaz Ahmed Khan (humanitarian) (1935–2021), Indian humanitarian, educationist, and social reformer
- Mumtaz Ahmed Khan (Jammu and Kashmir politician), Indian politician
- Mumtaz Ahmed Khan (Telangana politician) (born 1949), Indian politician
- Mumtaz Ali Khan (musician) (1920–1990), Bangladeshi singer, lyricist, and composer
- Mumtaz Ali Khan (politician) (1926/27–2021), Indian politician
- Mumtaz Hasan Kizilbash, Pakistani politician
- Mumtaz Mahal (1593–1631), Indian empress
- Mumtaz Ahmad Maharwi (born 1955), Pakistani politician
- Mumtaz Mirza (1927–1997), Pakistani scholar and television host
- Mumtaz Mufti (1905–1995), Pakistani novelist
- Mumtaz Mustafa (died 2024), Pakistani politician
- Mumtaz Md Nawi (born 1972), Malaysian politician and lawyer
- Mumtaz Patel, British nephrologist
- Mumtaz Qadir (born 1986), Indian cricketer
- Mumtaz Qadri (1985–2016), Pakistani police officer and murderer
- Mumtaz Ahmad Qaisrani (born 1972), Pakistani politician
- Mumtaz Hamid Rao (1941–2011), Pakistani television journalist and broadcaster
- Mumtaz Rashidi (1934–2004), Pakistani social worker and writer
- Mumtaz Shahnawaz (1912–1948), Pakistani diplomat and writer
- Mumtaz Shaikh (born 1981), Indian women's rights activist
- Mumtaz Shanti (1926–1994), Indian actress
- Mumtaz Shikoh (1643–1647), Indian Mughal prince
- Mumtaz Sorcar (born 1986), Indian actress
- Mumtaz Ahmed Tarar, Pakistani politician

=== Mümtaz ===
- Mümtaz Çeçen (1876–1941), Turkish Army officer
- Mümtaz Ökmen (1895–1961), Turkish lawyer, civil servant, and politician
- Mümtaz Sevinç (1952–2006), Turkish actor
- Mümtaz Soysal (1929–2019), Turkish politician
- Mümtaz Tahincioğlu (born 1952), Turkish racing driver
- Mümtaz Tarhan (1908–1970), Turkish politician
- Mümtaz'er Türköne (born 1956), Turkish academic and author

== Surname ==
=== Momtaz ===
- Jamshid Momtaz (born 1942), Iranian academic

=== Mumtaz ===
- Anjana Mumtaz (born 1941), Indian actress
- Ismail Mumtaz (1880–1933), Iranian statesman
- Khawar Mumtaz (born 1945), Pakistani women's rights activist
- Ruslaan Mumtaz (born 1982), Indian actor
- Salman Mumtaz (1884–1941), Azerbaijani literary scholar and poet

== See also ==
- Momtazuddin Ahmed, derived name
- Shabash
