= Wajid Zia =

Pakistani police officer

Director General of the Federal Investigation Agency
- In office November 2019 – 8 June 2021
- Appointed by: Imran Khan
- Succeeded by: Sanaullah Abbasi

Personal details
- Born: Islamic Republic of Pakistan
- Children: Abdul Rehman
- Occupation: Civil servant, Police Service of Pakistan

Wajid Zia is a retired Pakistani civil servant and police officer who served as BPS-22 grade as the Director General of the Federal Investigation Agency, from November 2019 to June 2021. He has previously served as the Inspector General of Railway Police. He first rose to prominence when he headed the joint investigation team to probe the Panama Papers case in 2017. He belongs to Tehsil Murree of District Rawalpindi.

== Career ==
Wajid Zia is ancy. He was appointed as DG FIA by Prime Minister Imran Khan in November 2019.

He has previously served as Inspector General of Railway Police. He first rose to prominence when he headed the joint investigation team to probe the Panama Papers case in 2017. Zia has previously served as the FIA additional director general (immigration) and twice in the Intelligence Bureau and Motorway Police. He also worked in the Economic Crimes Wing of the FIA.

== See also ==
- Hussain Asghar
- Rizwan Ahmed
- Allah Dino Khawaja
- Jawad Rafique Malik
- Moazzam Jah Ansari
