= Khyber Pakhtunkhwa Police =

Provincial law enforcement agency of Khyber Pakhtunkhwa, Pakistan

Khyber Pakhtunkhwa Police خیبر پختونخوا پولیس د خېبر پښتونخوا څارندوی
- Seal of the Khyber Pakhtunkhwa Police
- Common name: KP Police
- Abbreviation: KP

Agency overview
- Formed: 1889; 137 years ago
- Annual budget: Classified

Jurisdictional structure
- Operations jurisdiction: Khyber Pakhtunkhwa, Pakistan
- Map of Pakistan with the province of Khyber Pakhtunkhwa highlighted in red
- Area: 101,741 km^{2} (39,282 sq mi)
- Population: 45,000,000
- Legal jurisdiction: As per operations jurisdiction
- Governing body: Government of Khyber Pakhtunkhwa; Government of Pakistan
- General nature: Civilian police

Operational structure
- Headquarters: Peshawar, Khyber Pakhtunkhwa, Pakistan
- Agency executive: Zulfiqar Hameed(BPS-21 PSP), Inspector-General of Police
- Parent agency: Police Service of Pakistan

Facilities
- Police cars: Toyota Hilux; Suzuki Swift
- Armoured ISVs & Amphibious Scout cars: BRDM-2; Mohafiz (vehicle)
- Amphibious AFVs: Dragoon 300

Website
- kppolice.gov.pk

The Khyber Pakhtunkhwa Police (Urdu: خیبر پختونخوا پولیس, Pashto: د خېبر پښتونخوا څارندوی), formerly known as the Frontier Police, is the provincial law enforcement agency of Khyber Pakhtunkhwa, Pakistan.

== History ==
=== British colonial era ===
In 1849, the area corresponding to modern-day Khyber Pakhtunkhwa was annexed by the British Raj. Initially, the British maintained the policing system of the Mughals and Sikhs throughout most of the region; however, to establish a durable peace and security situation, the Punjab Frontier Force was raised. After the Indian Rebellion of 1857, there was no organized police force in British India, and a full-fledged policing system was established under the Commonwealth Police Act of 1861. The Act was extended to the Frontier Territory in 1889 and a number of armed personnel were placed at the disposal of the Deputy Commissioner/District Magistrate for police duties.

=== Police Act of 1861 ===
After gaining full control of India the British rulers constituted a Police Commission on 17 August 1860. This Commission submitted its report within 22 days with a draft Police Act which was enacted in 1861 and the present Police force came into being. This Police Act was drafted on the lines of Irish Constabulary Act and was primarily meant to create a Police force to consolidate and maintain British rule in the region. It was absolutely different from the philosophy, duties and objectives of Police forces in Great Britain.

In 1901, the frontier territory was constituted as a province called the North-West Frontier Province (N-WFP) and placed under the Chief Commissioner control who used to agent to the Governor General of India. In this new province, two administrative systems were established: The British territory of the province was divided into five Settled Districts, i.e. Hazara, Peshawar, Kohat, Bannu and Dera Ismail Khan and the territories lying in the North and the West of the settled districts were divided into five Political Agencies, i.e. Khyber, Mohmand, Kurrum, North Waziristan & the South Waziristan Agencies. Each Political Agency was under a Political Agent. The Settled Districts were under the Inspector General of Police (IGP) of the N-WFP. Criminal Courts were established under Code of Criminal Procedure in 1889. There was Cantonment Police for the protections of garrisons as well.

For Political Agencies, different Levies were raised like Samana Rifles, Border Military Police, Chitral Scouts and Kurrum Militia. In addition to the Levies, the indigenous Maliki and Khasadari systems were also allowed to continue. Samana Rifles and Border Military Police were later merged in 1913 to form a new force – the Frontier Constabulary (FC) was constituted. In 1935, Police Training School was established in Hangu.

After a reasonable time of its introduction and operations on ground, the government of British India appointed a seven-member commission headed by Andrew Henderson Leith Fraser on 9 July 1902 in order to have a detailed review and to recommend possible improvements. The Commission recommended limited organizational and procedural modifications.

=== After Independence ===
The Police Rules were framed in 1934 which provide detailed instructions/procedures on all aspects of Police working. After the independence of Pakistan in 1947, the Police Act of 1861 was still in vogue, yet successive governments appointed 24 commissions and committees to suggest proposals to improve the police force in teething country. The First Martyr/ Shaheed of KP Police was Assistant Sub-Inspector Arbab Rafiullah Jan. He was a brave officer from Peshawar. He sacrificed his life while solving a public dispute between two parties in 1966 and he was awarded civil award Tamgha E Shujaat for the sacrifice. From 1901 to 1947, all Inspector General were British military of civil officers. After independence in 1947, Khan Gul Muhammad Khan became the first local IG Police in 1948. In 1955, Muhammad Anwar Ali became the IGP when NWFP became part of West Pakistan under One Unit System. MAK Chaudhary was posted as IGP NWFP in 1970 after the abolishment of the One Unit system. In 2010, NWFP was renamed as Khyber Pakhtunkhwa (KP) during the tenure of IGP Malik Naveed Khan.

=== Modern times ===
From 1947 to 2001, no major paradigm shift took place in the Khyber Pakhtunkhwa police organisation except when the police uniform was changed and black coloured shirt was introduced while the Khaki drill trousers of Pakistan Army was kept intact. This was done during President Muhammad Ayub Khan's time. This pattern of uniform is still in use.

The Government promulgated a new police order 2002 which brought many important changes in the police system and made it more responsive accountable and democratic.

=== Special Police Organizations ===
- Rapid Response Force - Known by its initials, the RRF is a special combat unit in the police department and has the ability for rapid deployment. It is equipped with latest technological weapons and gear, it is mastered in counter terrorism, hostage rescue and any other security matters. The uniform for such officers and commandos is all black with the elite police logo.

The Khyber-Pakhtunkhwa government will provide funding for police commandos to receive training along the pattern of the al Zarrar company of the Pakistan Army's Special Services Group. The govt has also set up a training school in Nowshehra for this very sole purpose.

- Reserve Frontier Police, a 10,000 man force operating in the Khyber Pakhtunkhwa province (formerly "North West Frontier Province").
- Elite force - a specialized unite of 6,000 high risk security operations and counter terrorism.
- Khyber Pakhtunkhwa Police Special Combat Unit (SCU) - a large province wide tactical police unit

Beginning in the spring of 2019 the Levies and Khasadar became the armed reserve of the Khyber Pakhtunkhwa Police.

== Agency executives of Khyber Pakhtunkhwa Police ==
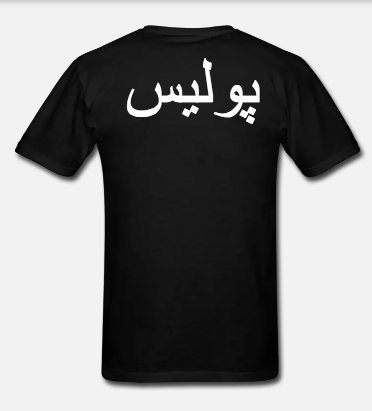
Khyber Pakhtunkhwa Police uniform shirt

=== Inspector Generals of Police ===
The current Inspector General of Khyber Pakhtunkhwa Police is: Zulfiqar Hameed PSP

Below is a list of former inspector generals that served the Khyber Pakhtunkhwa Police.

1. Arthur Finch Perrott (CIE, IP)
  - 4 April 1938 – 3 April 1939
  - 2 August 1940 – 1 September 1940
  - 2 December 1940 – 30 August 1944
  - 3 October 1944 – 1 July 1945
  - 29 August 1945 – 3 October 1945
2. Sir Oliver Gilbert Grace (CIE, OBE)
  - 10 April 1947 – 23 April 1948
  - 1 November 1948 – 9 August 1951
3. Sardar Abdur Rashid (PSP)
  - 10 August 1951 – 31 July 1952
  - 1 October 1952 – 23 April 1953
4. Ayub Baksh Awan (PSP)
  - 1 August 1952 – 9 November 1952
  - 24 April 1953 – 17 August 1955
5. Mahmood Ali Khan Chaudhry (PSP)
  - 1 July 1970 – 10 May 1971
6. Muhammad Muzaffar Khan Bangash (TQA, PPM, PSP)
  - 14 May 1971 – 7 Nov 1972
7. Saifullah Khan (PSP)
  - 7 November 1972 – 12 February 1974
8. Mian Bashir Ahmed (PSP)
  - 18 February 1972 – 19 February 1975
9. M Y Orakzai (PSP)
  - 19 February 1975 – 14 July 1980
10. Dil Jan Khan Marwat (PSP)
  - 1 December 1983 – 2 November 1985
11. Muhammad Abbas Khan (PSP)
  - 3 November 1985 – 1 June 1988
  - 29 January 1989 – 5 September 1990
12. Syed Saddat Ali Shah (PSP)
  - 12 June 1988 – 29 January 1989
13. Syed Masud Shah (PSP)
  - 5 September 1990 – 28 July 1993
  - 26 February 1994 – 10 November 1996
14. Javaid Qayum Khan (PSP)
  - 28 July 1993 – 26 February 1994
15. Muhammad Aziz Khan (PSP)
  - 10 November 1996 – 10 March 1997
16. Syed Kamal Shah (SST, PSP)
  - 10 March 1997 – 26 October 1999
17. Muhammad Saeed Khan (PSP)
  - 26 October 1999 – 7 June 2003
18. Muhammad Raffat Pasha (PSP)
  - 17 June 2003 – 8 January 2007
19. Muhammad Sharif Virk (PSP)
  - 8 January 2007 – 11 March 2008
20. Malik Naveed Khan (PSP)
  - 12 March 2008 – 30 August 2010
21. Fiaz Ahmad Khan Toru (PSP)
  - 31 August 2010 – 24 October 2011
22. Muhammad Akbar Khan Hoti (PSP)
  - 25 October 2011 – 16 April 2013
23. Lt.Cdr (R) Ihsan Ghani (PSP)
  - May 2013 - September 2013
24. Nasir Durrani (PSP)
  - 25 September 2013 – 16 March 2017
25. Syed Akhtar Ali Shah (PSP)
  - 17 March 2017 – 4 APRIL 2017
26. Salahuddin Khan Mehsud (PSP)
  - 31 March 2017 – 13 June 2018
27. Mohammad Tahir
  - 14 June 2018- 10 September 2018
28. Salahuddin Khan Mehsud (PSP)
  - 11 September 2018 to 9 February 2019
29. Muhammad Naeem Khan (PSP)
  - 11 February 2019 to 2 January 2020
30. Sanaullah Abbasi (PSP)
  - from 2 January 2020 to 11 June 2021
31. Moazzam Jah Ansari (PSP)
  - from 11 June 2021 to 10 February 2023
32. Akhtar Hayat Gandapur (PSP)
  - from 10 February 2023 to 31 January 2025
33. Zulfiqar Hameed (PSP)
  - from 31 January 2025 to Present

=== Additional IGs ===
Various Additional Inspector Generals of Police are assisting the IGP to look after distinct affairs in the Khyber Pakhtunkhwa province. Below is a list of current Additional IGPs:

- Addl:IGP Headquarters, Khyber Pakhtunkhwa: Awal khan
- Addl:IGP Elite Police Force, Khyber Pakhtunkhwa: Muhammad Wisal Fakhar Sultan Raja
- Addl:IGP Investigations, Khyber Pakhtunkhwa: Kashif Alam
- Addl:IGP IAB, Khyber Pakhtunkhwa: Alam Shinwari
- Addl:IGP Special Branch, Khyber Pakhtunkhwa: Muhammad Ali Gandapur
- Addl:IGP CTD, Khyber Pakhtunkhwa: Shaukat Abbas
- Addl:IGP Operations, Khyber Pakhtunkhwa: Mohammad Ali Babakhel
- Addl :IGP training, khyber Pakhtunkhwa: Muhammad Akhtar Abbas

== Designations ==
Designations of Khyber Pakhtunkhwa Police are as follow:

Grade	Police Ranks	Abbreviations
BPS-07	Constable	FC
BPS-09	Head Constable	HC
BPS-11	Assistant Sub-Inspector	ASI
BPS-14	Sub-Inspector	SI
BPS-16	Station House Office	SHO
BPS-17	Assistant Superintendent of Police; Deputy Superintendent of Police	ASP; DSP
BPS-18	Superintendent of Police	SP
BPS-19	Senior Superintendent of Police/Assistant Inspector General	SSP/AIG
BPS-20	Deputy Inspector General	DIG
BPS-21	Additional Inspector General	Addl. IG
BPS-22	Inspector General of Police	IGP

=== Posts ===
Sub Inspector KP, SDPO, DPO, CPO, RPO and PPO are posts, not ranks. So you may see a lower rank acting as a higher post for some time.[5]

== See also ==
- Law enforcement in Pakistan
- Balochistan Police
- Punjab Police
- Sindh Police
