= Sanaullah Abbasi =

Pakistani civil servant and police officer

Dr. Sanaullah Abbasi PSP

Director General of the Federal Investigation Agency
- In office 9 June 2021 – April 2022
- Preceded by: Wajid Zia
- Succeeded by: Rai Muhammad Tahir

IGP of KP
- In office 2 January 2020 – 8 June 2021
- Governor: Shah Farman
- Preceded by: Muhammad Naeem Khan
- Succeeded by: Moazzam Jah Ansari

Military service
- Allegiance: Pakistan
- Rank: Inspector General Gilgit Baltistan Police
- Commands: Giligit Baltistan, CTD
- Battles/wars: Street Crime, International Police Protocols

Dr. Sanaullah Abbasi PSP is a retired Pakistani civil servant and police officer who served as the Director General of the Federal Investigation Agency from 14 June 2021 to April 2022. He also served as inspector general of Khyber Pakhtunkhwa Police from 2 January 2020 to 8 June 2021.
