= Zulfiqar Hameed =

Pakistani police officer

- ذوالفقار حمید

Inspector General of Police, Khyber Pakhtunkhwa
- Incumbent
- Assumed office 31 January 2025
- Preceded by: Akhtar Hayat Gandapur

Personal details
- Born: c. 1970 Pakistan
- Education: Lahore University of Management Sciences (MBA, 2003)
- Profession: Police officer, civil servant

Military service
- Rank: Inspector General (BPS‑21)

Zulfiqar Hameed (born; c. 1970) is senior Pakistani police officer currently serving as the Inspector General (IG) of Khyber Pakhtunkhwa Police. A member of the Police Service of Pakistan (PSP), he holds the administrative grade of BPS‑21.

== Early life and education ==
Hameed was born in 1970. He studied MBA from Lahore University of Management Sciences (LUMS), graduating in 2003. He joined the police service as PSP in 1995 in the 23rd Common Training Course.

== Career ==
=== Punjab Police ===
He served in various districts of Punjab province, including as ASP and SDPO in regions like Hassan Abdal and on motorway patrols.

He held the position of Additional Inspector General of Punjab’s Special Branch prior to his KP appointment.

== Appointment as KP Inspector General ==
Appointed IGP KP in late January 2025, replacing Akhtar Hayat Gandapur. The decision was part of a broader federal government reshuffle aimed at bolstering provincial law enforcement.
