= Akhtar Hayat Gandapur =

Inspector General of Police, Khyber Pakhtunkhwa
- In office February 2023 – January 2025
- Preceded by: Moazzam Jah Ansari
- Succeeded by: Zulfiqar Hameed

Personal details
- Profession: Police officer, Civil servant

Military service
- Branch/service: Police Service of Pakistan
- Rank: BPS-21 (Inspector General)

Akhtar Hayat Gandapur is a Pakistani police officer who served as the Inspector General (IG) for Khyber Pakhtunkhwa Police from February 2023 to January 2025.

== Career ==
Hayat joined the Police Service of Pakistan (PSP) in 1994 after completing his basic training. Having reportedly received the Sword of Honour as the top graduate of 18th basic course, he subsequently served as the course’s senior ASP. He belonged to the 22nd Common Training Programme (CTP) of the PSP.

He had served in various roles across multiple provinces, including as District Police Officer (DPO) in Haripur, Nowshera, Charsadda, Mardan, Mansehra, Swat and as Regional Police Officer (RPO) in Malakand, Gwadar, Mardan, Hazara and Kohat. He also held positions within the Federal Investigation Agency (FIA), serving as Additional Director General at its headquarters in Islamabad, and as Zonal Director in KP.

=== Tenure as IGP, Khyber Pakhtunkhwa ===
Gandapur was appointed Inspector General of Police for Khyber Pakhtunkhwa in February 2023, replacing Moazzam Jah Ansari.

==== Removal and succession ====
Gandapur's tenure ended in January 2025, when a federal notification directed him to report to the Establishment Division. Zulfiqar Hameed (a Grade-21 officer who was earlier serving as Additional IG Special Branch in Punjab) was named as his successor.
