= Muhammad Naeem Khan (inspector general) =

Pakistani police official

IGP Muhammad Naeem Khan

IGP of KP
- In office 11 February 2019 – 2 January 2020
- Governor: Shah Farman
- Preceded by: Salahuddin Khan Mehsud
- Succeeded by: Sanaullah Abbasi

Military service
- Allegiance: Pakistan

Muhammad Naeem Khan was a senior police officer from Pakistan who served as the inspector general of Khyber Pakhtunkhwa Police from 11 February 2019 to 2 January 2020.
