= Syed Akhtar Ali Shah =

Acting IGP of Khyber Pakhtunkhwa
- In office 17 March 2017 – 4 April 2017
- Governor: Iqbal Zafar Jhagra
- Preceded by: Nasir Durrani
- Succeeded by: Salahuddin Khan Mehsud

Personal details
- Education: University of Peshawar; Abdul Wali Khan University Mardan
- Awards: Quaid-e-Azam Police Medal; Pakistan Police Medal

Military service
- Allegiance: Pakistan

Syed Akhtar Ali Shah (Urdu: سيد اختر علی شاہ) is a retired Pakistani police officer.

Shah briefly served as the Acting Inspector General of Khyber Pakhtunkhwa Police in 2017. In 2006, Shah became the first to introduced the counter-terrorism policy in Khyber Pakhtunkhwa. He served in the Mardan Division from 2008 to 2011 against militants.

Shah got his LLB and Political Science (MA) degrees from University of Peshawar and a doctoral research in Political Science from Abdul Wali Khan University Mardan.
