= Mohammad Tahir =

Pakistani police officer

Muhammad Tahir
- محمد طاہر

Inspector General of Punjab Police
- In office 11 September 2018 – 9 October 2018
- Succeeded by: Amjad Javed Saleemi

Military service
- Allegiance: Pakistan
- Rank: Inspector General

Mohammed Tahir was a Pakistani police officer who served as the Inspector General of Police in Punjab. Prior to his appointment as IG for Punjab, he served as IG Khyber Pakhtunkhwa. A 16th batch of civil services, he joined the police service in 1988 as an assistant superintendent.

He was replaced as IG on 9 October 2018.
