= Mumtaz Hasan =

Pakistani poet, literary scholar (1907–1974)

Mumtaz Hasan (1907–1974) was a Pakistani poet and literary scholar.
