= Mumtaz Shaikh =

Women's rights activist from India

- Born: 18 November 1981 (age 44); Ahmednagar, Maharashtra, India
- Occupation: human rights activist
- Years active: 2000 – present
- Known for: Work done on Prevention of Violence Against Women & Girls (VAWG) / Right to Pee Campaign for free, clean, safe, public urinals for women. She has been instrumental in creating Mahila Mandal Federation of 300 women's federation with a strength of 10000 women from Dalit and Muslim communities.

Mumtaz Shaikh (born 18 November 1981) is a women's rights activist from India who launched a successful campaign for equal access to public toilets in Mumbai. She was selected by the BBC in 2015 as one of its inspirational 100 Women campaign.

== Early life ==
Mumtaz Shaikh was born in 1981 in Ahmednagar, Maharashtra. Her father, Abu Bakker, was a chauffeur and spoke Malayalam and her mother, Madina spoke the Hindi language. Soon after her birth, the family, which also included an older brother, Rafique, moved to the Vashi Naka neighborhood of the Mumbai suburb, Chembur. When family violence caused Shaikh to be sent to live with an uncle, she worked performing household chores in exchange for shelter, but often went hungry. When she was five and her brother was eight, their father took Rafique to his parents in Kerala and went to work in Dubai. After a difficult childhood of extreme poverty, Shaikh left school after the 9th grade and her uncle arranged a marriage for her when she was fifteen. The marriage was troubled and after the birth of her own daughter at sixteen, Shaikh began secretly attending lectures on family violence in her community provided by social workers from the Committee of Resource Organizations (CORO). Over her husband's objections, she became a volunteer for the organization, soon developing enough confidence to file for divorce.

== Career ==
Becoming a core team member for CORO in 2000 and selected for a Leader's Quest fellowship in 2005, Mumtaz began mentoring other women in her community. Rising through the organization over the next decade, she became CORO's joint secretary and in 2006 remarried. When CORO created the Mahila Mandal Federation, Mumtaz was made its executive president. As a part of COROs sanitary programs, Mumtaz began addressing issues with public toilets in 2011 and in 2012 led a survey to evaluate safety and conditions at bathroom facilities. In 2013, she began a campaign targeting the issue of unequal access to toilet facilities in Mumbai. Based on a similar campaign, Occupy Men’s Toilet, from China, 32 non-governmental organizations came together sponsoring a day-long seminar to kick off their effort to increase free access to toilets for women. Mumtaz became the spokesperson for the Right to Pee Campaign, which focused on the fact that though women represent around 50 percent of the workforce in urban areas, they have little access to toilets, unless they can pay. In 2012 in Mumbai, the government provided 5,993 public toilets and 2,466 urinals for men, but only 3,536 facilities for women. Train stations had worse conditions, providing less than 100 urinals and toilets for the 69 stations located on the Central and Harbour Rail Lines. Men paid nothing to use a urinal, but women had to pay to use a toilet. To limit the number of times they urinated, women frequently drank inadequate amounts of water, leading to health complications.

The initiative was widely acknowledged, resulting in the government mandating that every 20 kilometers throughout Mumbai, a block of toilets for women were to be constructed. Within one year, pressure from women's organizations had resulted in announcement of 96 new toilet facilities to be built in Mumbai by MCGM. Mumtaz was awarded the title of "Daughter of Maharashtra" by Nari Samta Manch, Pune and in 2015 was honored by the 100 Women Series of the BBC, as an inspiration. Her dedication to sanitation and the right of women to equality had spread to Sangli and Vidarbha by 2015 and was expanding to address safety in the city. She returned to her education, entering an undergraduate program studying politics, after the birth of her second child. Throughout 2016, Shaikh continued to work on the issue of public toilets, women's safety and health issues caused by the lack of proper facilities and government inaction. She launched plans to extend the program throughout the state of Maharashtra, studying the local needs of various locations.
