= Aftab Durrani =

Pakistani civil servant

Aftab Akbar Durrani

Interior Secretary of Pakistan
- Incumbent
- Assumed office 18 September 2023
- Preceded by: Abdullah Khan Sumbal

Secretary of Religious Affairs and Interfaith Harmony

Personal details
- Profession: Civil Servant

Aftab Akbar Durrani is a BPS-22 officer of the Pakistan Administrative Service. He is currently serving as the Secretary Interior. His appointment as Interior Secretary came after the death of his predecessor Abdullah Khan Sumbal. Durrani has also held several key positions within the government.

== Career ==
Prior to Durrani's appointment as Home Secretary, he was serving as Secretary of Religious Affairs and Interfaith Harmony Division.

=== Appointment as Secretary Interior ===
On 18 September 2023, the federal government of Pakistan appointed Aftab Akbar Durrani as the new interior secretary after the death of the acting interior secretary Abdullah Khan Sumbal.
