= Dil Jan Khan =

Pakistani civil servant (1934–2026)

Dil Jan Khan (Urdu: دل جان خان) (11 November 1934 – September 2026 was a Pakistani policeman and civil servant, once vice president of the International Narcotics Control Board.

== Biography ==
Ethnically, Dil Jan Khan was a Marwat, born in District Lakki Marwat of Pakistan. He joined the Police Service of Pakistan on January 21, 1961 and later worked as an Inspector General of Police, Interior Secretary of Pakistan, Federal Secretary for State and Frontier Regions (SAFRON), and as commandant of the Frontier Constabulary. His cousin Abdul Majeed Khan Marwat was also commandant FC (Frontier Constabulary) in Khyber Pakhtunkhwa.

After retiring, Dil Jan Khan founded in 2005 and chaired a charity dedicated to the underprivileged communities.

Dil Jan Khan had a Bachelor of Arts, Bachelor of Laws and Master of Arts in Political Science

After an early career at the Embassy of Pakistan in Kabul in the 1970s, and then with the Frontier Constabulary in North-West Frontier Province in the late 1970s and 1980s, he took on a number of national government positions, including Secretary of the Narcotics Control Division (1990 and 1993-1994), Secretary of the States and Frontier Regions Division of the Government of Pakistan (1990-1993)

He headed the delegation of Pakistan in a number of intergovernmental meetings and fora. He became member of the International Narcotics Control Board in 1995.

Dil Jan Khan was a recipient of numerous awards and distinctions and participated in a number of charities and non-profits.

== See also ==
- Bannu
