= Momtazuddin Ahmed =

Momtazuddin Ahmad is a Bengali masculine given name of Arabic origin. It may refer to:

- Momtazuddin Ahmad (1889–1974), Islamic scholar
- Momtazuddin Ahmed (philosopher) (1903–1971), philosopher and educationist
- Momtazuddin Ahmed (dramatist) (1935–2019), dramatist
- Momtaz Uddin Ahmed (1944–2019), chief of Bangladesh Air Force
- Mohammad Mamtaj Uddin Ahmed, High Court justice

== See More ==
- Momtaz Uddin Pramanik (1946–2003), politician
- A. N. M Momtaz Uddin Choudhury, first vice-chancellor of Islamic University, Bangladesh
