= Nasir Durrani =

Pakistani police officer (1957–2021)

Nasir Khan Durrani (PSP)
- ناصر خان درانی

Inspector General of the Khyber Pakhtunkhwa Police
- In office 25 September 2013 – 16 March 2017
- Governor: Mehtab Ahmed Khan Iqbal Zafar Jhagra
- Preceded by: Lt. Cdr (R) Ihsan Ghani
- Succeeded by: Salahuddin Khan Mehsud

Personal details
- Born: March 17, 1957
- Died: April 19, 2021 (aged 64) Lahore

Military service
- Allegiance: Pakistan
- Branch/service: Khyber Pakhtunkhwa Police & Punjab Police
- Rank: Inspector General

Nasir Khan Durrani (17 March 1957 – 19 April 2021) was a Pakistani senior police officer belonging to the 10th CTP who served in BPS-22 grade.

== Biography ==
Durrani was born in Pakistan on 17 March 1957. In September 2013, he was appointed the Inspector General of Police of Khyber Pakhtunkhwa, where he served till March 2017. As Inspector General of Police, Durrani managed department policy and oversaw all patrol and speciality units. He was a Pashtun, belonging to Durrani tribe.

After winning the elections in 2018, Imran Khan shared in his first speech to the nation that he had asked Durrani to help improve the police standards of Punjab province. He was subsequently appointed the chairman of the Punjab Police Reform Commission in September 2018, where he served until October 2018.

Nasir Durrani died on 19 April 2021, in Mayo Hospital, Lahore of COVID-19.
