= Salahuddin Khan Mehsud =

IGP Salahuddin Khan Mehsud

IGP of KP
- In office 31 March 2019 – 17 june 2021
- Governor: Iqbal Zafar Jhagra
- Preceded by: Nasir Durrani

Military service
- Allegiance: Pakistan

Salahuddin Khan Mehsud is a retired Grade 22 Pakistani police officer who previously served as the Commandant of Frontier Constabulary (CFC) and as the Inspector-general of police of Azad Kashmir from March 2019 to June 2021. He also served as the Inspector General of Police of Khyber Pakhtunkhwa from March 2017 till February 2019. Khan also served in the CID, Intelligence Bureau, Traffic Police, Frontier Reserve Police and the Counter-Terrorism Force for over two years. Khan is a native of South Waziristan.
