= Director General of the Federal Investigation Agency =

Head of a government agency of Pakistan

The Federal Investigation Agency, responsible for border control, criminal investigation, counter-intelligence and security of Pakistan, is headed by a Director General. It is a highly coveted post and is usually occupied by a Grade 22 officer of the Police Service of Pakistan. The Director General of the Federal Investigation Agency (DG FIA) reports directly to the Interior Secretary of Pakistan.

== Director Generals (1974–Present) ==
Sr. No	Name	Period
1	M.Y.Orakazi	1974
2	M.A.K.Chaudhary	1975
3	M.A.K. Hayat	1977
4	M. Akram Sheikh	1977
5	M.S. Anwar	1977
6	M. Aslam Hayat	1977
7	Obaid ur Rehman Khan, PSP	1986
8	Syed Salman Khaliq, PSP	1989
9	Wajahat Latif, PSP	1990
10	G. Moinuddin, PSP	1993
11	B.R. Awan, PSP	1993
12	Sarosh Rauf Alvi, PSP	1993
13	Ghulam Asghar Malik, PSP, QPM	1994
14	Khawar Zaman, PSP	1996
15	Mian Muhammad Amin, PSP	1997
16	Major Gen. Rtd. Inayat Ollah Khan Niazi,	1997
17	Iftikhar Ahamad Khan, PSP	1998
18	Major(r) Mushtaq Ahmed, PSP	1999
19	Malik Asif Hayat, PSP	1999
20	Muhammad Rafique Malik, PSP	2000
21	Saiyed Mohib Asad, PSP	2001
22	Tariq Parvez, S.I., PSP	2005
23	Tariq Masood Khosa, PSP	2009
24	Zafarullah Khan, PSP	2009–2010
25	Waseem Ahmed, PSP	2010–2010
26	Malik Muhammad Iqbal, PSP	2010-2011
27	Syed Tahsin Anwar Ali Shah, PSP	2011-2012
28	Javed Iqbal, PSP	2011–2012
29	Fayyaz Ahmed Leghari, PSP	2012–2012
30	Muhammad Anwar Virk, PSP, PPM	July 2012 –
31	Mr. Saud Mirza, PSP	
32	M. Ghalib Ali Bandesha PSP	
33	M. Akbar Khan Hoti, PSP	
34	Muhammad Amlish, PSP	March 2016-2017
35	Bashir Memon, PSP	August 2017-2019
36	Wajid Zia, PSP	
37	Abdullah Malik(Special Branch), PSP	Serving
38	Hamza Naseem(Special Branch), PSP	Serving
39	Waseem Khan(Special Branch), PSP	Serving
40	DR Sana Ullah Abbasi, PSP	Serving
41	Mr. Muhammad Tahir Rai, PSP	22 April 2022-27 July 2022
42	Mr. Muhammad Mohsin Butt, PSP	27 July 2022-27 Jan 2024
43	Mr Ahmad Ishaque Jehangir, PSP	27 Jan 2024-29 Jan 2025
44	Mr Raja Riffat Mukhtar, PSP	24 Mar 2024-3rd Feb 2026
45	Dr Usman Anwar, PSP	3rd Feb 2026-incumbent
