= Mumtaz Hussain (general) =

Pakistani military person

Major General Mumtaz Hussain HI(M) TBt
- Alma mater: Military College Jhelum Pakistan Military Academy
- Military career
- Allegiance: Pakistan
- Branch: Pakistan Army
- Service years: 1990–2025
- Rank: Major General
- Unit: 8 Punjab Regiment
- Conflicts: Second Battle of Swat
- Awards: Hilal-i-Imtiaz (Military); Tamgha-e-Basalat; Golden Wound Strip

Mumtaz Hussain (ممتاز حسین; HI(M) TBt) is a Pakistani military officer. He was a major general of the Pakistan Army. He was commissioned into the 8th Punjab Regiment through the 82nd Long Course of the Pakistan Military Academy. He served in several command and staff appointments, including as General Officer Commanding (GOC) of the Special Service Group (SSG) and as Director General of Personnel at Pakistan Ordnance Factories, Wah Cantonment, before retiring in 2025.

== Career ==
Hussain was commissioned into the 8th Punjab Regiment through the 82nd Long Course of the Pakistan Military Academy after completing his matriculation and intermediate from Military College Jhelum. He was promoted from Brigadier to Major General in June 2018 as part of a cohort of thirty-seven brigadiers elevated to that rank.

As a major general, Hussain served as General Officer Commanding (GOC) of the 7th Infantry Division. In 2019, he was appointed GOC of the Special Service Group (SSG). In his capacity as GOC SSG, he visited Sri Lanka in September 2019 to observe Exercise Cormorant Strike X-2019, during which he called on the Sri Lanka Army Commander and the Chief of Defence Staff.

Subsequently, Hussain served as Director General of Security and Garrison at XII Corps. His final appointment was Director General of Personnel at Pakistan Ordnance Factories, Wah Cantonment, a post he held until his retirement in 2025.
