= Moazzam Jah Ansari =

Officer of the Police Service of Pakistan

Moazzam Jah Ansari HI, QPM, UNPM
- معظم جاہ انصاری

IGP of Balochistan
- In office 28 August 2024 – 4 August 2025
- Preceded by: Abdul Khaliq Shaikh

Commandant of Frontier Constabulary
- In office 12 May 2023 – 28 August 2024
- Preceded by: Salahuddin Khan Mehsud
- Succeeded by: Riaz Nazir Gara

IGP of KP
- In office 9 June 2021 – 10 February 2023
- Preceded by: Sanaullah Abbasi
- Succeeded by: Akhtar Hayat Gandapur

Commandant of Frontier Constabulary
- In office 30 September 2018 – 10 June 2021
- Preceded by: Liaqat Ali Khan
- Succeeded by: Salahuddin Khan Mehsud

IGP of Balochistan
- In office 18 October 2017 – 12 July 2018
- Preceded by: Ahsan Mehboob
- Succeeded by: Mohsin Butt

Personal details
- Education: Sadiq Public School
- Awards: Hilal-e-Imtiaz; Quaid-e-Azam Police Medal; UN Police Medal in Hercegovina, Bosnia

Military service
- Allegiance: Islamic Republic of Pakistan
- Years of service: 1989 - 2025
- Rank: Inspector General (BPS-22)

Moazzam Jah Ansari (Urdu: معظم جاہ انصاری) is a retired Grade-22 officer of the Police Service of Pakistan who served as the Inspector General of Police in both Balochistan and Khyber Pakhtunkhwa and commanded the Frontier Constabulary twice. On 14 August 2025, he was Pakistan's second-highest civilian award, the Hilal-e-Imtiaz, for exceptional contribution to law enforcement and public safety.

Ansari holds a master's degree in International Relations and is also the recipient of the Quaid-e-Azam Police Medal (QPM) — the highest police gallantry award of the country — and has been awarded the UN police medal. He is a graduate of the National Defence University Islamabad. Ansari has previously served as the Joint Director General Intelligence Bureau (Balochistan), Deputy Inspector General of Police (DIG) Gwadar and Director FIA in Sindh. He has also held various command positions including Senior Superintendent of Police in Punjab, KPK and Sindh.

== See also ==
- Central Superior Services
- Frontier Constabulary
- Balochistan Police
- Federal Investigation Agency
- Police Service of Pakistan
