= Federal Constabulary =

Federal paramilitary force of Pakistan

Federal Constabulary وفاقی جمیعتِ سپاہیانِی
- Common name: Federal Constabulary

Agency overview
- Formed: 1915
- Employees: 33,000

Jurisdictional structure
- Operations jurisdiction: Pakistan
- Governing body: Ministry of Interior
- Constituting instruments: Frontier Constabulary Act, 1915; Federal Constabulary Rules, 2025
- General nature: Gendarmerie

Operational structure
- Headquarters: Islamabad
- Agency executive: Riaz Nazir Gara, Commandant

Website
- www.fc.gov.pk

The Federal Constabulary (Urdu: جمیعتِ سپاہیانِ وفاقی, romanised: Jamiyati Spahiyani Wafaqi), formerly known as the Frontier Constabulary, is a federal paramilitary force and gendarmerie of Pakistan under the control of the Interior Secretary of Pakistan, which operates in all of Pakistan after the 2025 Ordinance. It is responsible for maintaining law and order, and dealing with situations beyond the capabilities of Pakistan's police force. It also guards against tribal incursions, criminal gangs, and contraband smuggling.

The Federal Constabulary was created in 1915 as the Frontier Constabulary by amalgamating the Border Military Police (formed in 1852) and Samana Rifles (formed in 1879), during the British Raj. Both of the forces were guarding the border between the tribal areas and the then-settled areas of the North-West Frontier Province (after which it is named).

The Federal Constabulary is often confused with Frontier Corps as both forces abbreviated as ''FC''. Frontier Corps are group of four paramilitary forces officered by the Pakistan Army. On other hand, Federal Constabulary is officered by the Police Service of Pakistan.

In July 2025, the federal government announced its plans to rename the organisation as the Federal Constabulary, along with a number of steps for its restructuring and the extension of its jurisdiction to all provinces and territories of the country.

On 13 September 2025, the Government of Pakistan approved the relocation of the headquarters of the Federal Constabulary from Peshawar to Islamabad, the Federal capital city. The decision was made in a high level meeting led by Minister for Interior Mohsin Naqvi.

== History ==
The Frontier Constabulary was created as an independent Civil Armed Force, under the provisions of Frontier Constabulary Act, 1915. under this Act, Frontier Constabulary Rules 1958 were framed. This force is also under the administrative control of the Ministry of Interior. From an operational point of view, the functioning of this force is supervised by the Home departments of the respective provincial governments. The Frontier Constabulary, an armed police force, also operates in a small area bordering FATA and the settled districts. The KPK police does not have jurisdiction over FATA's agencies or the Frontier Regions. Originally, it was aimed at stopping incursions and raids from the tribal areas. Now, its original function has been overshadowed by an increasing involvement in the internal security duties and protection of vital installation as well as embassies.

In 2018, Interior Minister Ahsan Iqbal said that the federal government was deliberating on a proposal to revamp the Frontier Constabulary as the Pakistan Constabulary to bring it on an equal footing with the other law-enforcement agencies.

The federal government announced its intention to convert the FC into a nationwide federal force on 13 July 2025, renaming it as the Federal Constabulary and empowering it to operate in all territories and provinces. This would be made possible with amendments to the Frontier Constabulary Act, which would be approved by the federal cabinet. A subsequent presidential ordinance would extend the force's jurisdiction to the whole country, with recruitment offices being established countrywide. The force would remain under the command of the Police Service of Pakistan, however. The move was a part of a wider effort to improve Pakistan's internal security.

== Organisational structure ==
The Federal Constabulary is headed by the Commandant, the equivalent of Inspector General of Police (BPS-22 grade) and is popularly referred to as the CFC. The Deputy Commandant is equivalent of Deputy Inspector General of Police; a District Officer is equivalent of Senior Superintendent of Police and an Assistant District Officer is the equivalent of Assistant Superintendent of Police. The senior hierarchy of FC is drawn from the Police Service of Pakistan.

=== Ranks ===
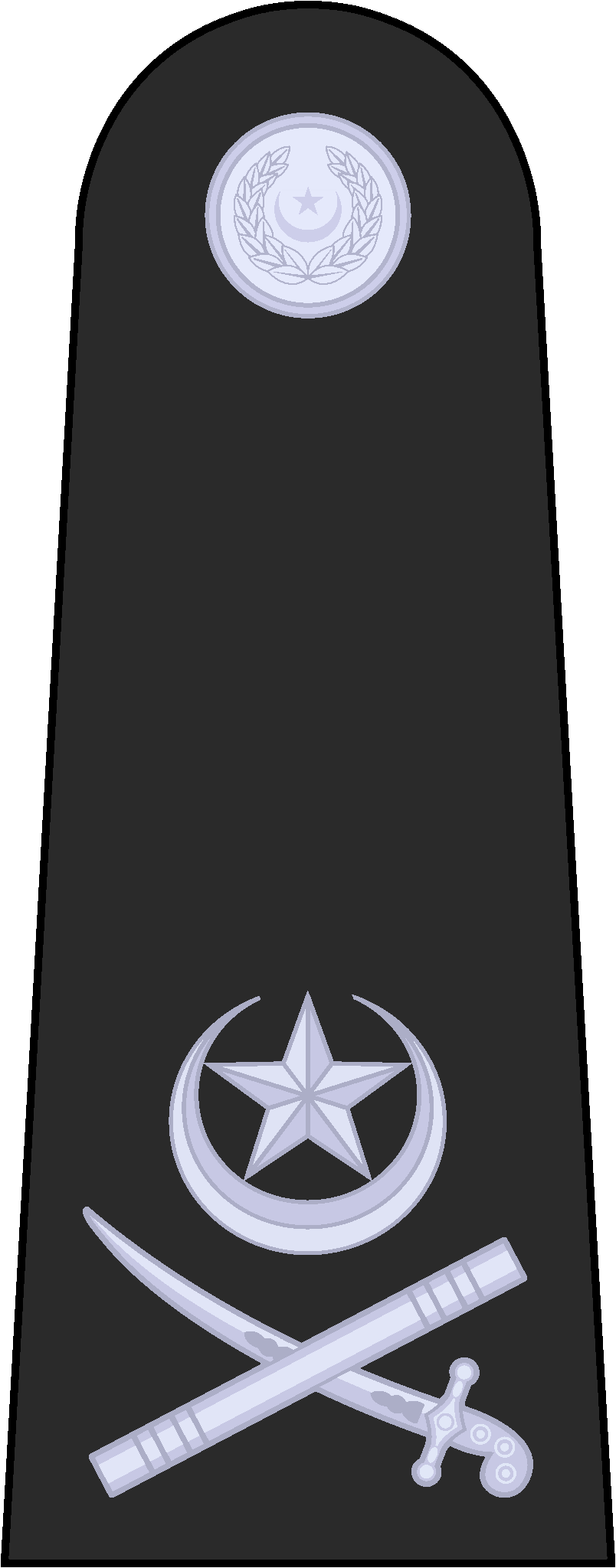
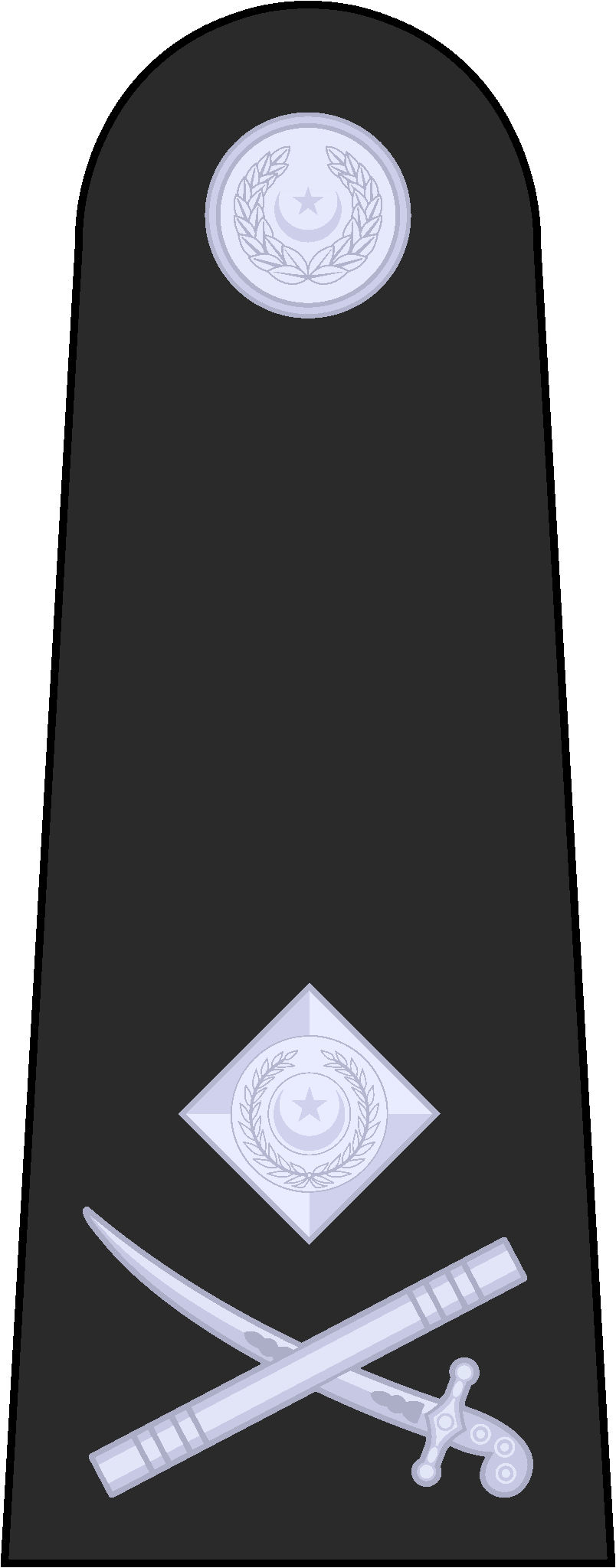
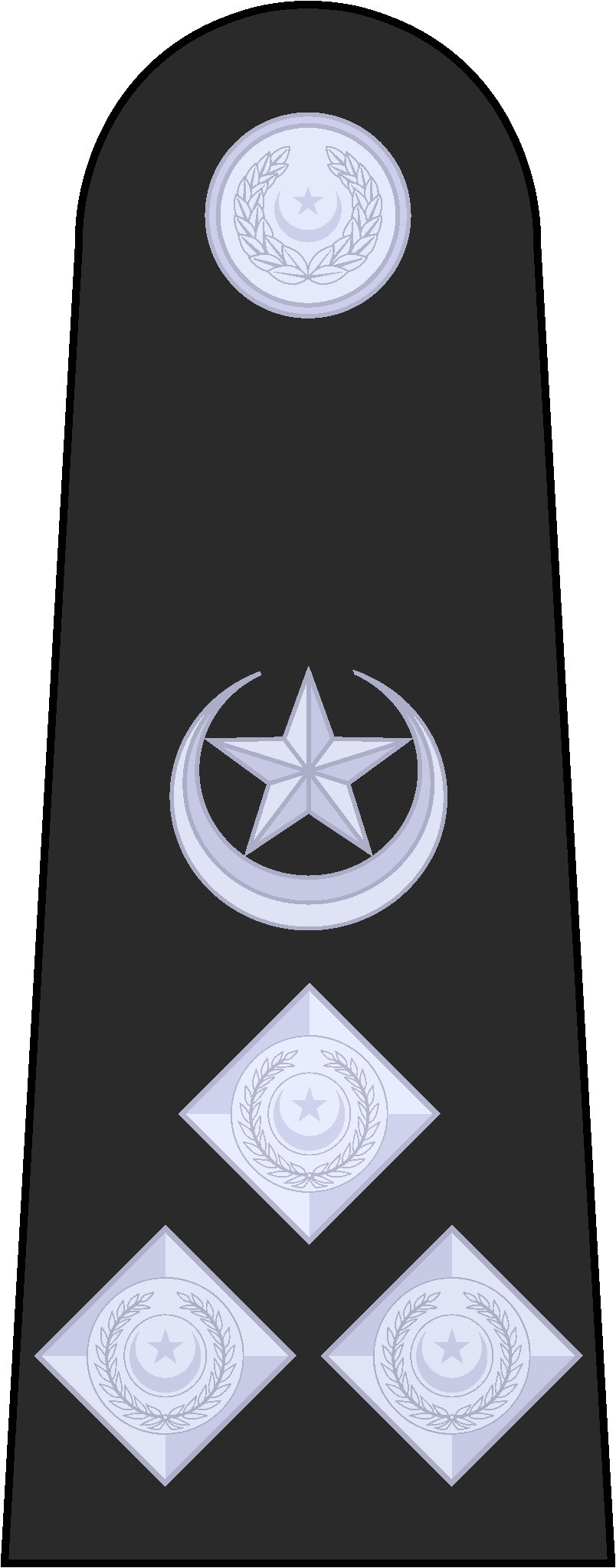
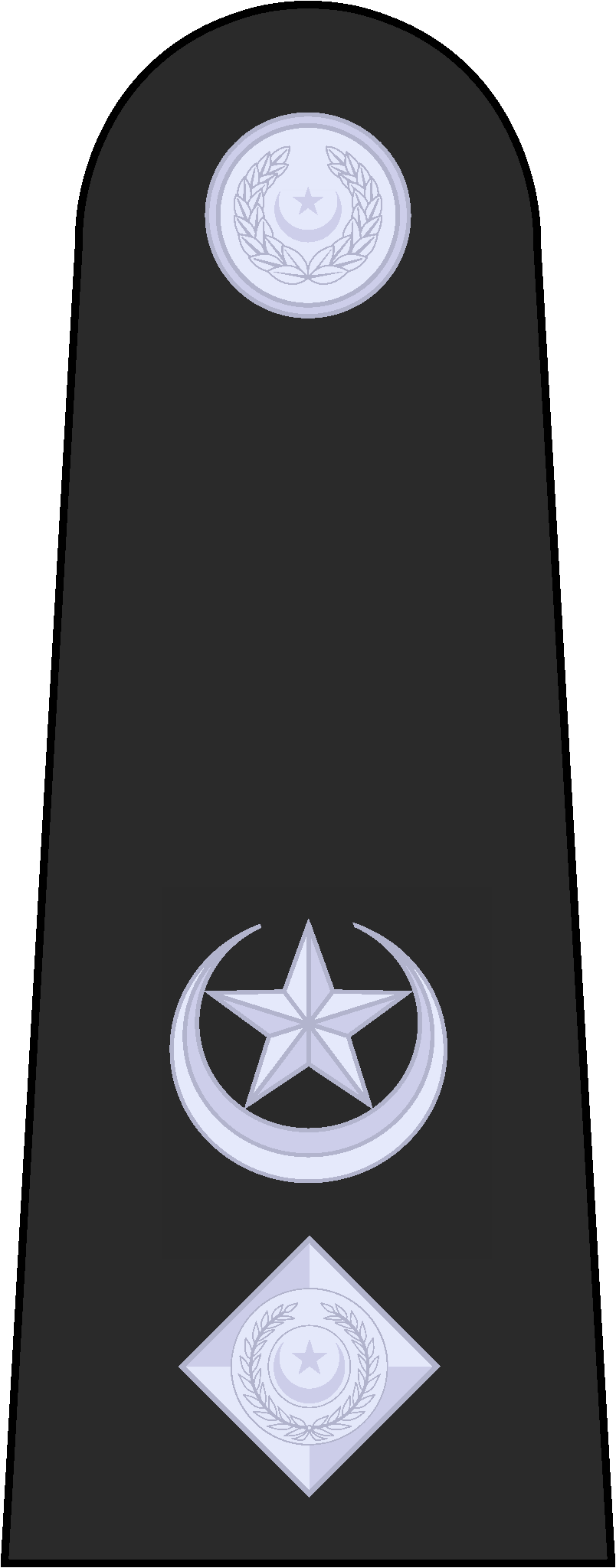
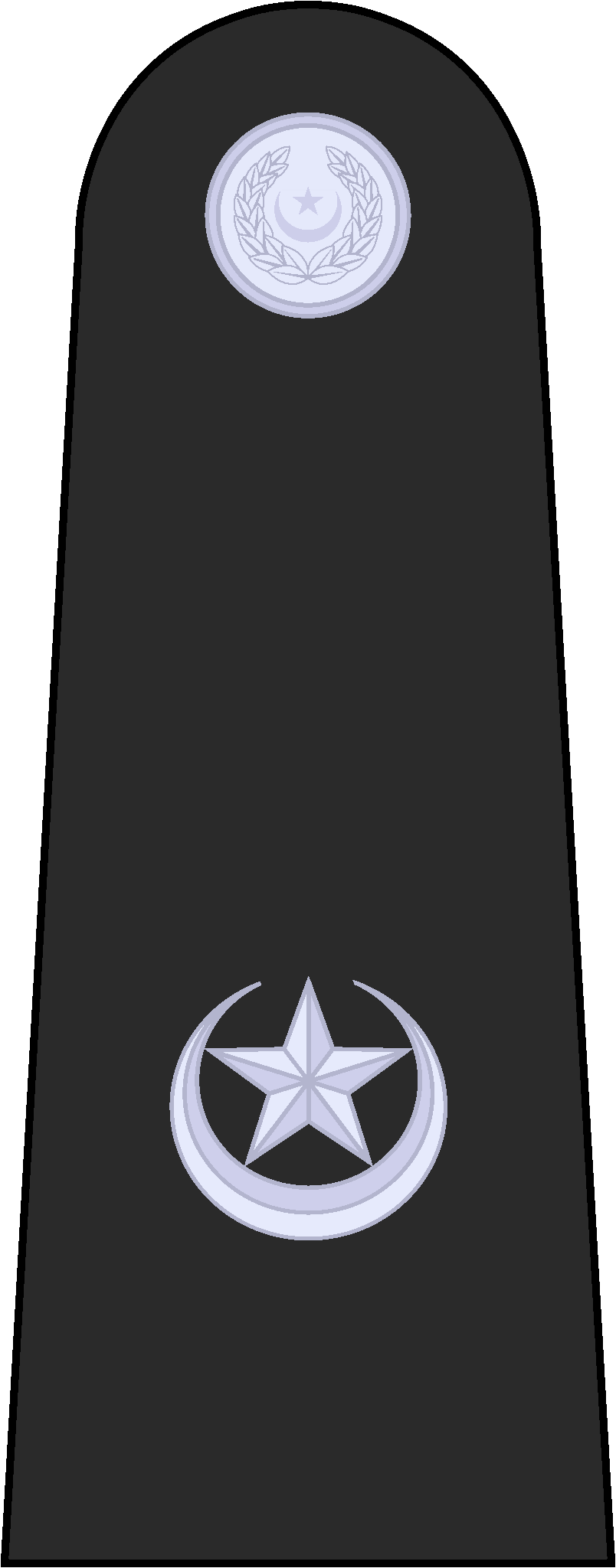
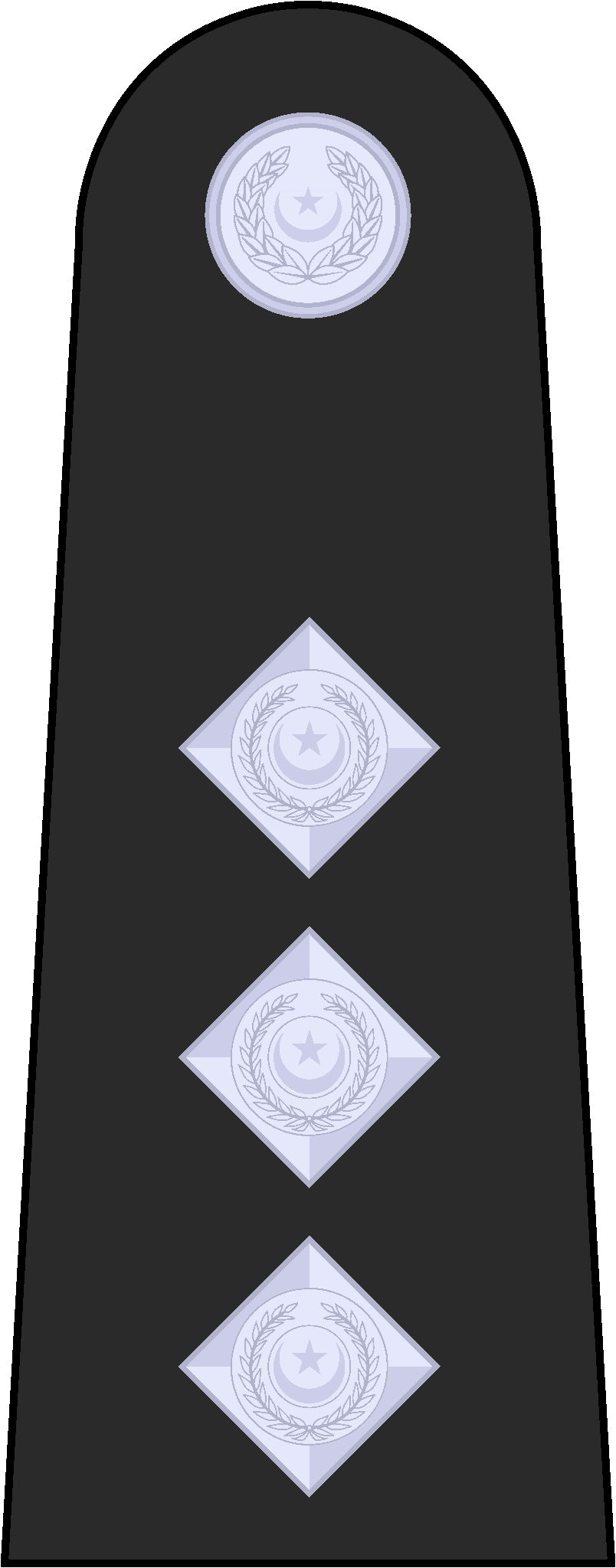
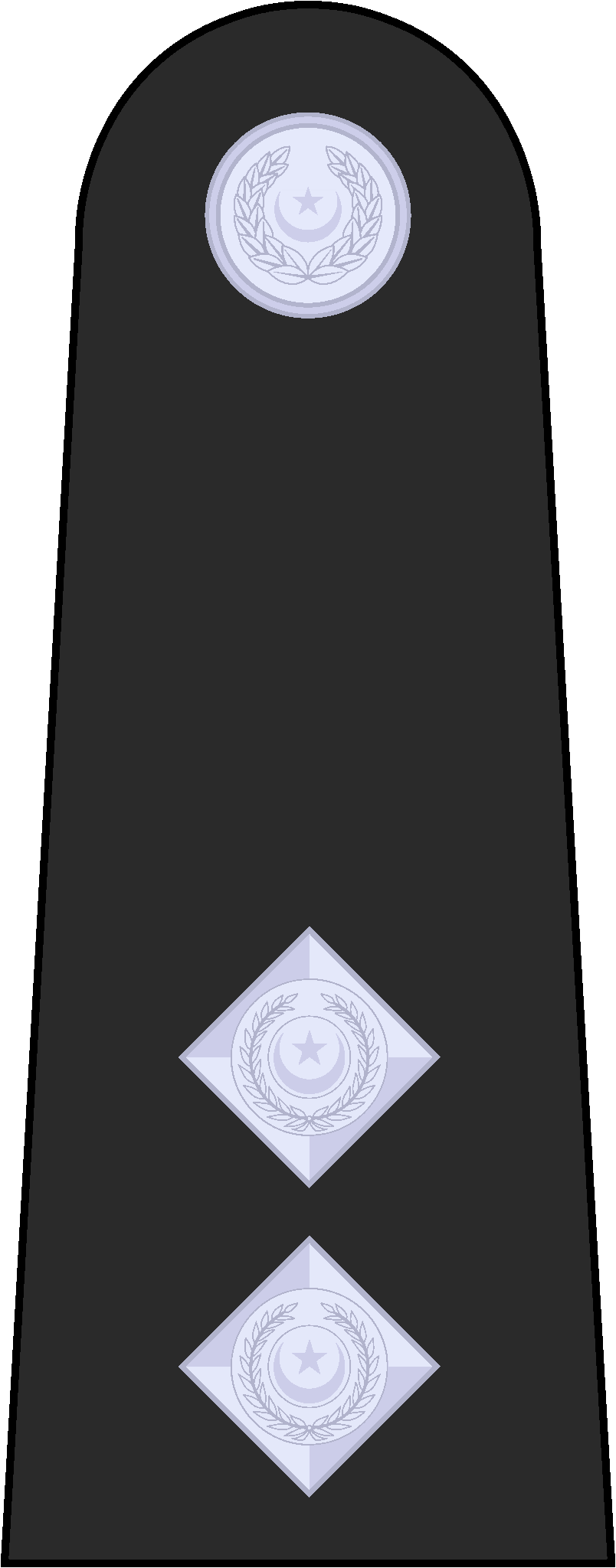
Rank group	General / flag officers		Senior officers	Junior officers
Pakistan; Federal Constabulary
Pakistan; Federal Constabulary	Commandant Federal Constabulary کمانڈنٹ	Deputy commandant ڈپٹی کمانڈنٹ۔	District officer ضلعی افسر۔	Assistant district officer اسسٹنٹ ڈسٹرکٹ آفیسر۔

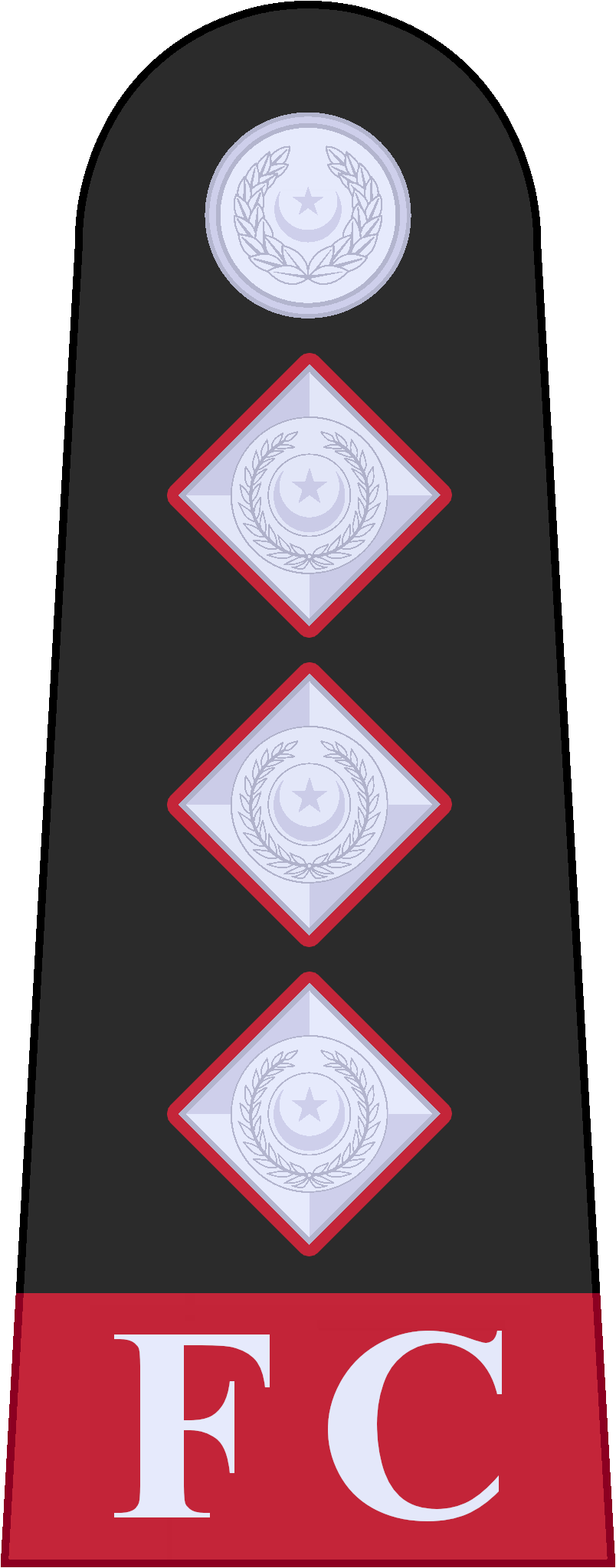
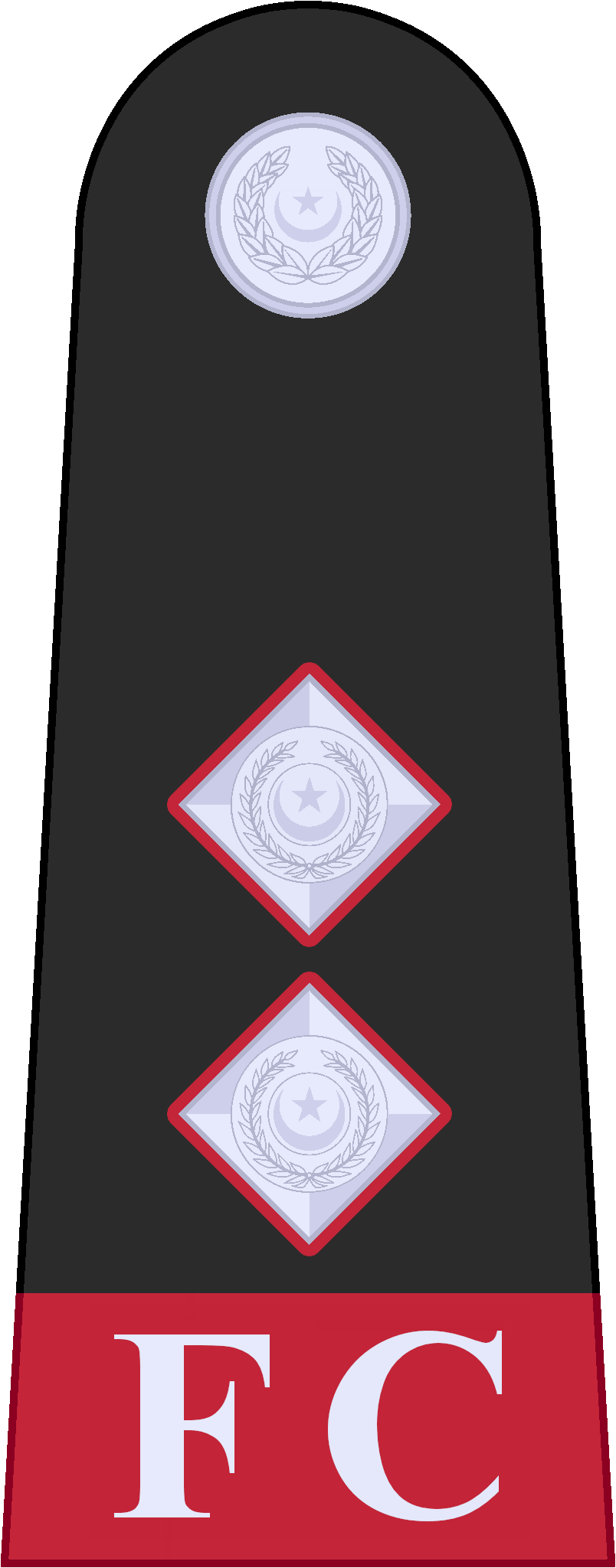
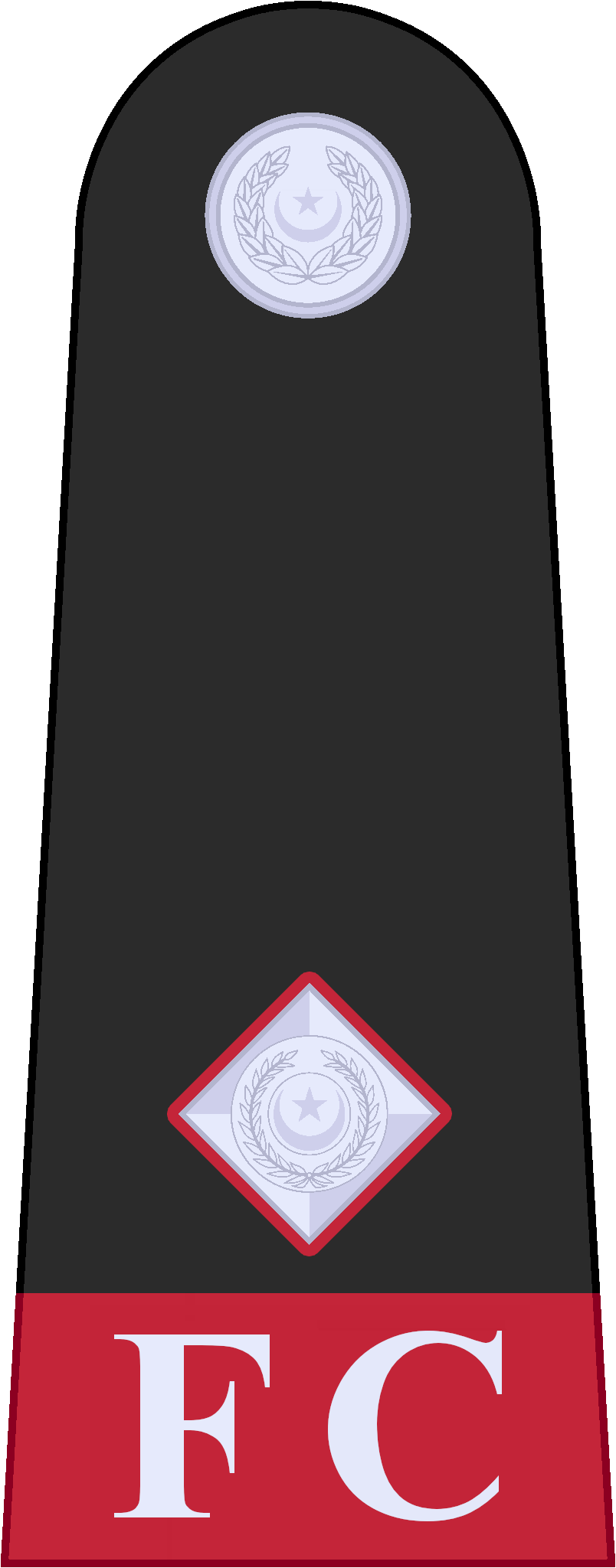
Rank group	Junior commissioned officers			Non commissioned officer	Enlisted
Pakistan; Federal Constabulary							No insignia
Pakistan; Federal Constabulary	Subedar-Major صوبیدار میجر	Subedar صوبیدار	Naib Subedar نائب صوبیدار	Havildar حوالدار۔	Naik نائیک۔	Lance Naik لانس نائیک۔	Constable کانسٹیبل

== Area of responsibility ==
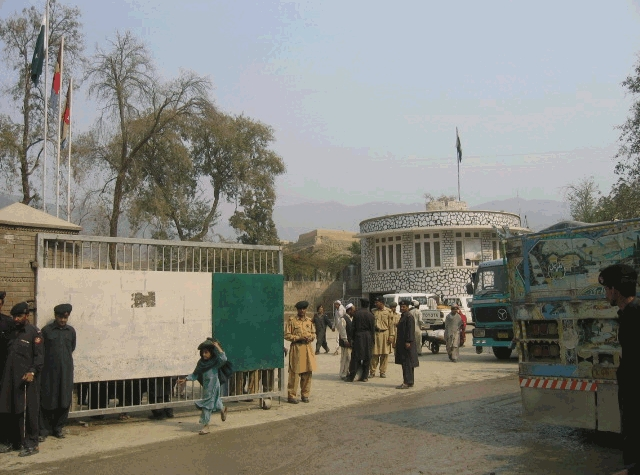
Kurta wearing soldiers of the former Frontier Constabulary at the Torkham border crossing gate, circa 1st March 2004.

The Frontier Constabulary accomplished its basic function by dividing the area of responsibility into the Frontier Constabulary districts which in turn had an intricate network of Forts, Posts and Pickets located strategically along the tribal settled border. With the passage of time, and additional duties assigned to the Frontier Constabulary, the geographical area covered by the Frontier Constabulary was also increased. Until 2025 there were 17 Frontier Constabulary districts stretching from Gilgit in the extreme north to Karachi in the extreme South of the country. Thus, until 2025, in all the provinces of Pakistan, except Punjab, the Frontier Constabulary was performing duties. However, various Frontier Constabulary platoons had also been deployed in Punjab for the security of sensitive installations and VVIPs.

As of 2025, the new Federal Constabulary is to be active and deployed to every province of Pakistan as well as the autonomous Northern areas.

Following are some major duties which are assigned to Federal Constabulary:

- To guard the border between tribal and settled area.
- To stop tribal incursions in individual cases or in the form of gangs.
- To check outlaws and their evil designs in the area.
- To stop kidnapping and checking on tribal disputes on the administrative borders.
- To act as a second line of defense in times of grave emergency.
- To assist the local administration in times of need (internal security).
- To control and eliminate poppy cultivation and growth.
- To check trafficking of narcotics, illegal weapons and smuggling.
- To perform any other duties assigned by the government.

== Training facilities ==
- FC Shabqadar. Located 40 km North of Peshawar created in 1922. Capacity 700 recruits.
- FC Hayatabad. Located 15 km West of Peshawar. Created in 1985 but Training facility started in 2009 due to occupation of FC Training Centre Swat at Kanju by Army. Capacity 500 recruits.

== Commandants of the Frontier Constabulary ==
- R.C Boyle Esq. C.I.E (1912–1921)
- E.C Handyside Esq. C.I.E OBE (1921–1926)
- A.F Perrott Esq. LP (1926–1926)
- AV Short Esq. CIE (1926–1928)
- B.C.A Lawather Esq. I.P (1928–1928)
- H. Lillie Esq. (1933–1935)
- AV Short Esq., CIE (1935–1936)
- K.B.T Mohammad Khan B.A.I.P (1936–1936)
- G. Gilbert Grace, Esq. C.I.E. OBE. (1937–1944)
- H.F Scroggie Esq. OBE (1947–1948)
- S.A Rashid OBE, P.S.C. (1948–1951)
- Nawabzada Mohammad Farid Khan PSP (1952–1953)
- Mohammad Anwar Afridi PSP (1953–1955)
- Pir Sarwar Shah B.A. LLB. P.S.C. (1956–1958)
- Muzaffar Khan Bangash, TQA, PPM, PSC (1969–1970)
- Shafi Ullah Khan PSP (1971–1972)
- Mohammad Jaseem Khan (1972–1978)
- Dil Jan Khan S.B.T (1978–1980)
- Syed Saadat Ali Shah (1980–1982)
- Muhammad Abbas Khan (1983–1986)
- Gohar Zaman Khan Mohmand (1986–1988)
- Muhammad Aziz Khan (1988–1991)
- M. Saeed Khan (1991–1995)
- Afzal Ali Shigri (1995–1996)
- Syed Kamal Shah (1996–1997)
- Muhammad Aziz Khan (1997–1997)
- M. Saeed Khan (1997–1999)
- Syed Kamal Shah (1999–2000)
- Israr Mohammad Khan Shinwari (2000–2005)
- Sikandar Mohammadzai (2005–2006)
- Malik Naveed Khan (2006–2008)
- Zafarullah Khan PSP, PPM (Bar) (2008–2009)
- Safwat Ghayur PSP, SJ (2009–2010)
- Akbar Khan Hoti PSP (2010–2011)
- Abdul Majeed Khan Marwat PSP (2011–2014)
- Liaqat Ali Khan PSP, (2014–2018)
- Moazzam Jah Ansari PSP, QPM, UNPM (2018–2021)
- Salahuddin Khan Mehsud (2021–2023)
- Moazzam Jah Ansari PSP, QPM, UNPM (2023–2024)
- Riaz Nazir Gara PSP, (2024–Present)
