= Frontier Force Regiment =

Infantry regiment of the Pakistan Army

- Insignia of the FFR
- Active: 1843–present (59th Scinde Rifles)
- Country: Company Raj (1843–1858); British India (1858–1947); Pakistan (1947–present)
- Branch: Presidency Armies; British Indian Army; Pakistan Army
- Type: Infantry
- Role: Mechanized infantry; Motorized infantry; Artillery combat
- Size: 52 battalions
- Regimental centre: Abbottabad, Khyber Pakhtunkhwa
- Nickname: 'Piffers'
- Mottos: Arabic: لَبَّيْكَ (transl. 'I am here') (Talbiyah)
- Colours
- March: The Hundred Pipers (traditional)
- Anniversaries: Defence Day: 6 September; Piffer Week
- Engagements: Indian Rebellion of 1857; Second Anglo-Afghan War; Tirah Campaign; Boxer Rebellion; Somaliland Campaign; World War I; Third Anglo-Afghan War; World War II; Indo-Pakistani War of 1947–1948; Indo-Pakistani War of 1965; Bangladesh Liberation War; Indo-Pakistani War of 1971; Siachen conflict; Somali Civil War; Battle of Mogadishu (1993); Kargil War

Commanders
- Colonel-in-chief: Field Marshal Asim Munir, NI(M)
- Colonel-Commandant: Field Marshal Asim Munir, NI(M)
- Notable commanders: Field Marshal Asim Munir; Gen. Musa Khan; Gen. Abdul Waheed; Gen. Raheel Sharif; Lt Gen Agha Ibrahim Akram

The Frontier Force Regiment is one of the six infantry regiments of the Pakistan Army. They are popularly known as the Piffers in reference to their military history as the PIF (Punjab Irregular Force) of the British Indian Army, or as the FF (Frontier Force). The regiment takes its name from the historic North-West Frontier, a former province of British India and later Pakistan (present-day Khyber Pakhtunkhwa).

Most of the regiment's ancestral military formations were units composed of infantry of either Punjabi or Pathan origin. However, the oldest unit of the regiment is the Scinde Camel Corps, raised in 1843 under Company rule in India. Another ancestral unit was the infantry component of the British Indian Army Corps of Guides (partial cavalry unit). Despite being a Pakistani regiment, the Frontier Force Regiment is also the successor to several Sikh regiments due to their widespread deployments in the North-West Frontier during the British Raj.

Presently, the regiment consists of 52 battalions, with its regimental centre located in Abbottabad, Khyber Pakhtunkhwa. Due to this regiment's presence, Abbottabad is also locally known as the "Home of the Piffers". In its current form, the Frontier Force Regiment consists of both mechanized and motorized infantry battalions; there are also some armoured and artillery battalions which were raised from the ranks of the Frontier Force or one of its predecessor regiments.

The modern Frontier Force is Pakistan's third-oldest military regiment in terms of the date of most recent amalgamation, behind the Punjab and Baloch regiments. The regiment was raised in its current form in 1957, through the amalgamation of two (with a later third component) former British Indian Army regiments: the 12th Frontier Force Regiment and the 13th Frontier Force Rifles. The third component, the Pathan Regiment, had been raised from the elements of the former two. The regiments' merger took place when a major formation reorganization was carried out in the Pakistan Army.

Battalions of the Frontier Force Regiment have seen extensive wartime combat with neighbouring India during all of the Indo-Pakistani wars that have occurred since the Partition of India in 1947. Outside of the subcontinent, the regiment's elements have also served overseas, having been deployed to Saudi Arabia in the Middle East and to Somalia in Eastern Africa as part of the 1990s United Nations humanitarian peacekeeping force in Somalia. In the latter deployment, Frontier Force battalions participated in the Battle of Mogadishu in 1993.

The battalions are divided under independent formations and are commanded by their formation commander. Training and record-keeping is undertaken by the regimental depot, which is usually directed by a brigadier. The regiment's highest-ranking officer is given the honorary title of Colonel-Commandant (usually for Lieutenant-Generals) or "Colonel-in-Chief" (for the Chief of Army Staff or Chairman of the Joint Chiefs of Staff Committee).

== Origins ==
Muhammad Ali Jinnah, the founder of Pakistan, meeting with officers of 6th Bn, Frontier Force Rifles (Now 1st FF).

The Frontier Force Regiment came into being in 1957 with the amalgamation of the Frontier Force Regiment, the Frontier Force Rifles and the Pathan Regiment, all of which had their origins in the British Indian Army. During the 1840s, after the first and second Anglo-Sikh Wars, Colonel Sir Henry Lawrence, the Honourable East India Company's agent to the Lahore Durbar (brother of the later Lieutenant-Governor of the Punjab Sir John Lawrence, 1st Baron Lawrence) sanctioned the raising of the Corps of Guides and a number of infantry regiments by incorporating veterans from the disbanded Sikh Khalsa army. During the early 1850s some of Lawrence's Sikh regiments were designated the "Punjab Irregular Force", giving rise to the "Piffer" nickname which the Regiment carries to the present day, and through a series of reorganisations that culminated in 1922, these units would eventually become the 12th Frontier Force Regiment and 13th Frontier Force Rifles. The use of the pre-fixing regimental numbers was discontinued in 1945, the two regiments becoming the Frontier Force Regiment and the Frontier Force Rifles, and both regiments were transferred to Pakistan by the United Kingdom in 1947, on the independence to British India.

The Pathan Regiment was raised after independence from the 4th Battalion of the Frontier Force Regiment and the 4th and 15th Battalions of the Frontier Force Rifles. Initially the regimental depot was at Dera Ismail Khan but it relocated to Kohat in 1949 and was later merged into the Frontier Force Regiment with its regimental depot at Abbottabad. Fifteen of the modern Frontier Force Regiment's 52 battalions trace their origins back to British Indian Army units, as tabulated below.

Origins of merged battalions of the Frontier Force Regiment
Battalion	Founder units
1st	6th Royal Bn Frontier Force Rifles; 59th Royal Scinde Rifles (Frontier Force) - Mechanised infantry (Mounted Rifles)
2nd	5th Bn Frontier Force Regiment; 1st Bn QVO Corps of Guides (Frontier Force) Lumsden's Infantry - Infantry Scouts
3rd	1st Bn (PWO Sikhs) Frontier Force Regiment; 51st The Prince of Wales' Own Sikhs (Frontier Force) - Line Infantry Rifles
4th	2nd Bn (Sikhs) Frontier Force Regiment; 52nd Sikhs (Frontier Force) - Mountain Infantry Rifles
5th	3rd Royal Bn (Sikhs) Frontier Force Regiment; 53rd Sikhs (Frontier Force) - Anti-Tank
6th	4th Bn (Sikhs) Frontier Force Regiment; 54th Sikhs (Frontier Force) - Paratroop Battalion
7th	1st Bn Frontier Force Rifles; 55th Coke's Rifles (Frontier Force) - Line Infantry Rifles
8th	2nd Punjab Infantry, 2/13 Frontier Force Rifles, 56th Punjabi Rifles (Frontier Force) - Line Infantry Rifles, Commonly known as BHAIBANDS
9th	4th Bn Frontier Force Rifles; 57th Wilde's Rifles (Frontier Force) - Mechanised Infantry (Mounted Rifles)
10th	5th Bn Frontier Force Rifles; 58th Vaughan's Rifles (Frontier Force) - Mountain Infantry
11th	1st Bn Pathan Regiment; 14th Bn Frontier Force Regiment; 54th Sikhs (Frontier Force) - Heavy Support (Mortar) - Mechanised Infantry
12th	3rd Bn Pathan Regiment; 15th Bn Frontier Force Rifles - Mountain Infantry
13th	8th Bn Frontier Force Regiment - Mechanised Infantry
14th	War-raised on 1st April 1941 as the 9th Bn Frontier Force of the 12 Frontier Force Regiment^{[A]} - post 1948, known as 9th Bn the FF Regiment, until standardisation in 1956, following which it was re-numbered as the 14th Bn the Frontier Force Regiment
15th	2nd Bn Pathan Regiment; 4th Bn Frontier Force Rifles; 57th Wilde's Rifles - Mechanised (Mounted Rifles) Infantry & Anti-Aircraft Support
Note: The 10th (Training) Battalion of the original Frontier Force Regiment (originally raised as 2nd Battalion QVO Corps of Guides during World War I) became the Regimental Centre of the new merged regiment.^{A} At the end of World War II the war-raised 9th Battalion, instead of being disbanded, was used to re-form the 2nd Battalion (Sikhs) Frontier Force Regiment which had been annihilated in Malaya during the war. On 1 October 1948 a new 9th Battalion was raised and it was this unit which was to become the 14th Battalion of the merged regiment.

== Composition ==
At present, the Frontier Force Regiment musters 67 infantry battalions, some of which are mechanised or motorised with the remainder known colloquially as "foot infantry". Each battalion is subdivided into four companies, normally named Alpha, Bravo, Charlie, and Delta. The regiment also includes armoured and artillery units, established from among its strength. All Piffer battalions serve alongside other Pakistan Army units in mixed formations; operational control resides with the appropriate brigade, whereas administrative control remains with the Frontier Force regimental depot. The regiment recruits mostly from the Pashtun tribes of Khyber-Pakhtunkhwa, although officers and other ranks from all over Pakistan have served and continue to serve in the regiment. Prior to 2000, the Piffers had been standardised to include equal numbers of Pashtuns and Punjabis in its non-officer ranks, but in 2000, this composition was amended to include 10% Sindhis and 5% Balochis, reducing the quota of Punjabis to 35%. This measure was intended to diminish segregation within the Army.

== Headquarters ==
The regiment is currently based in Khyber-Pakhtunkhwa's city of Abbottabad, which also houses the depots of the Baloch Regiment and the Army Medical Corps. The city was originally the headquarters of the Frontier Force Rifles prior to their merger with the Frontier Force Regiment and the Pathan Regiment (then based at Sialkot and Kohat respectively). The Abbottabad depot is responsible for the regiment's basic recruit training. Initially recruits are trained for a period of 36 weeks. Since 1981 has housed the Piffer Museum, which records the Piffer's regimental history. The museum's collection includes medals, weapons, dress and insignia, portraits and flags, history books, albums, paintings, cutlery and musical instruments. Abbottabad is also home to the Piffer Memorial, a 28 feet (8.5 m) tall obelisk built of sandstone known as Yadgar-e-Shuhada. This was originally erected at Kohat by Field Marshal William Birdwood on 23 October 1924 in the memory of those killed in World War I, but in 1964 on the orders of the then Commander-in-Chief General Muhammad Musa, it was moved to Abbottabad. It was unveiled in Abbottabad in April 1965. A Roll of Honour is displayed around the memorial on plates, and wreath-laying ceremonies are held on important national days and by visitors. Later a replica of the memorial was built at its original location at Kohat in 2001.

== Kashmir dispute ==
Since independence in 1947, India and Pakistan have fought three major wars and one minor war, and have been involved in an ongoing conflict since 1984. The casus belli for most of these is the dispute between the two countries over the status of the state of Kashmir. Piffers participated in each of these conflicts with the participation in the war of 1947 by its founding formations.

=== Indo-Pakistani War of 1965 ===
A contingent of the FF Regiment with Indian POWs captured by 6th FF

Concerned by what it saw as Indian attempts to absorb the disputed region of Kashmir, in 1965 Pakistan launched Operation Gibraltar to foment a popular uprising against Indian control in Jammu and Kashmir. However, the operation did not produce the hoped-for results, and following a period of escalating clashes between Indian and Pakistani troops and irregulars from April to September, the Indo-Pakistani War of 1965 began. Also known as the Second Kashmir War (the first having been fought in 1947), the five-week conflict led to territorial gains and losses, and caused thousands of casualties, on both sides, before ending in a United Nations mandated ceasefire followed by Russian mediation.

The Frontier Force Regiment's units participated in the war in all active sectors along the Indo-Pakistani border, including Kashmir, Chhamb, Sialkot, Lahore, Khemkaran and Rajasthan. The 6th and 12th FF were involved in the advance on the Chhamb–Jaurian–Akhnur axis, and the 6th FF also fought in the Badiana-Chawinda-Pasrur axis, along with the Guides Cavalry, the 11th Cavalry, 1st SP Artillery and the 3rd, 4th, 9th, 13th and 14th FF, where the largest tank battle at that time since World War II was fought. The 3rd FF Battalion, while defending the border opposite Maharajke, was run over by the Indian Army's armoured division. The 7th, 11th, 15th and 16th FF took part in the defence of Lahore; the 1st, 2nd, 5th and 10th FF took part in the capture of Khem Karan in the Kasur Sector, and the 8th and 18th FF made significant gains in the Rajasthan Sector. Some fighting continued after the ceasefire, and two months later in the Rajasthan Sector, the 23rd FF re-captured the Sadhewala Post. The three Piffer armoured regiments successfully repulsed the Indian offensive in the Sialkot sector, while the Guides Cavalry turned back repeated assaults from India's 1st Armoured Division. Another armoured regiment (the 11th Cavalry) also fought at Chhamb as part of the newly raised 6th Armoured Division. The 1st SP Field Artillery, while providing fire support in the battle of Chawinda, lost their commanding officer Lieutenant Colonel Abdul Rehman. Recognizing their combat performance, the unit was authorised to wear red piping on their collars.

=== Indo-Pakistani War of 1971 ===
In 1971, following a divisive election result, civil war broke out in the former East Pakistan (now Bangladesh) between the West Pakistani administrative authorities and the majority local population. India, to where many of East Pakistan's exiled political leaders and refugees from the fighting had fled, provided support for the dissidents including arming and training a Bangladeshi irregular force (the Mukti Bahini). To relieve pressure on their forces in the east, in December 1971 Pakistani forces launched a pre-emptive attack on India from the west, which was only partially successful and met with massive retaliation. Fighting on two fronts, Pakistan agreed to a ceasefire after the surrender of her forces in the east and territorial losses in the west (later ceded back to Pakistan following the 1972 Simla Agreement).

Piffer units fought in both east and west. The 31st FF, Pakistan's first national service battalion, raised in November 1971 just before the war, was deployed at Lahore and in the Khemkaran Sector. In East Pakistan, the 4th and 13th FF were present at the Battle of Hilli, where 4th FF held its position until ordered out. Major Muhammad Akram of the 4th FF was posthumously awarded Pakistan's highest award for gallantry, the Nishan-e-Haider. Other units which operated from East Pakistan were the 12th, 15th, 22nd, 24th, 25th, 26th, 30th and 38th FF. They became prisoners of war once Dhaka fell to the Indian army in December 1971.

In West Pakistan, the 11th Cavalry saw heavy fighting in the Chhamb sector. The 2nd FF Battalion, while defending Shisabladi post at Kashmir sector, drove back an Indian brigade. Along with 2nd FF 3rd, 5th, 17th and 33rd FF also operated in the Kashmir sector. In the Sialkot sector, the 19th, 23rd, 27th, 29th, 35th and 37th FF took part in fighting. The 35th FF Battalion suffered heavy casualties in an offensive at Jarpal, the area captured a day before. An Indian commander, Lieutenant-Colonel V P Airy, of the 3rd Grenadier Guards who fought against 35th FF said: "35 FF's immortal attack won their commanding officer, Lieutenant-Colonel Akram Raja, a posthumous Hilal-i-Jur'at, with the highest compliment a gallant soldier could receive". The 8th and 18th FF fought on the Lahore front. In the Sulemanki sector, the 6th FF gained fame when it captured the Beriwala Bridge on Sabuna Drain on 3 December and repulsed five attempts by opposition forces to retake it. Major Shabbir Sharif, a holder of the Sitara-e-Jurat from the 1965 conflict, was awarded a posthumous Nishan-e-Haider. The 36th FF also fought in the Sulemanki sector, and the 20th, 21st, and 39th FF saw action in the Rajasthan sector. After enemy offensive the 21st and 39th FF withdrew from Parbat Ali, a stronghold in that sector.

=== Siachen conflict ===
As a result of a vague demarcation of territory in the 1972 Simla Accord, both Pakistan and India lay claim to the Siachen Glacier, which lies in the eastern Karakorum mountain range at altitudes of up to 18,875 feet (5,753 m). Following a period of tension, in April 1984 the Indian Army launched Operation Meghdoot with the aim of capturing the glacier. Pakistan responded in kind, but Indian troops had already occupied the major mountain passes west of the glacier and captured many strategic points. Both countries established military posts, and from 1984 until 2003, intermittent fighting took place. The conflict is remarkable for the harsh conditions under which it was fought—on average, one Pakistani soldier died every fourth day, with most of the casualties caused by the severe climate.

A number of Piffer units were deployed to the world's highest battleground, including the 3rd, 4th, 8th, 24th, 26th, 28th, 31st, 36th, 38th, 39th and 47th FF. In addition, some Northern Light Infantry Battalions, who were the first to arrive, were led by Piffer officers. Frontier Force casualties in the conflict include three officers, two junior commissioned officers, and 81 other ranks killed in action.

=== Kargil War ===
The town and district of Kargil in Jammu and Kashmir lies on the Line of Control (LOC), the de facto border between Pakistan and India in the Kashmir region. In May 1999 elements in the Pakistan Armed Forces covertly trained and sent troops and paramilitary forces into Indian territory. The aim was to sever the link between Kashmir and Ladakh, and cause Indian forces to withdraw from the Siachen Glacier, thus forcing India to negotiate a settlement of the broader Kashmir dispute. The Kargil Conflict was triggered when Pakistan captured around 130 Indian observation posts on the Indian side of the LOC. As India responded, regular Pakistan army units were called up.

The 19th, 33rd, 38th and 44th FF Battalions, and some Piffer officers serving in Northern Light Infantry battalions, participated in the conflict. In total four officers and twenty four other ranks were killed in action. The war ended after the then Prime Minister of Pakistan, Nawaz Sharif, agreed to call the troops back on 4 July 1999, after meeting with U.S President Bill Clinton.

== International duty ==
=== Operations ===
A Piffer infantryman (centre) in Somalia, with the green flag of Pakistan.

The Frontier Force Regiment has served outside Pakistan in various multinational and peacekeeping roles. From 1981 to 1988, the Piffer's mechanised infantry battalions were stationed at Tabuk, Saudi Arabia, as part of a Pakistani armoured brigade allocated for the defence of the Islamic holy land. However, the brigade was withdrawn after the Government of Pakistan was unable to accede to a Saudi request that only Sunnis be included in the troops sent to their land. Then President of Pakistan, General Zia-ul-Haq said, there was no discrimination in the Pakistan Armed Forces.

Pakistan formed part of the multinational coalition force that participated in the 1991 Gulf War. Deploying up to 5,500 troops in a strictly defensive role, the Pakistani contingent included the 63rd FF Battalion, which was stationed at Tabuk and Arar until the cessation of hostilities. The early 1990s also saw Pakistan's increased participation in UN peacekeeping operations. In 1992, the 7th FF Battalion spearheaded the UN military mission to Somalia. The US Marine landing on Mogadishu beach was in an area secured by the 7th FF, and the 5th, 8th and 15th FF were also deployed to the region. On 3 October 1993, the 15th FF's Quick Reaction Force participated in the Pakistani-led rescue operation of a force of US Rangers that had become pinned down in Mogadishu; contrary to the fictionalised depiction of events in the movie Black Hawk Down, a number of Rangers were taken to safety in the 15th's armoured personnel carriers.

Following the operation the United Nations Secretary General's Special Representative, Admiral Jonathan Howe and UNOSOM Force Commander, Lieutenant General Çevik Bir appreciated Pakistani troops' efforts and thanked them for helping the US troops. Major General Thomas M. Montgomery, Deputy Commander of the United Nations Forces in Somalia while praising Pakistani forces' said in a television interview, "Many of the soldiers are alive today because of the willingness and skill of the Pakistani soldiers who worked jointly in a rescue operation with Malaysian and American soldiers in most difficult and dangerous combat circumstances. Such splendid soldiers to Somalia who we feel proud to serve with. Pakistani soldiers have been completely dependable even in the most difficult circumstances. They have shouldered a huge and dangerous load for UNOSOM and the Somali people."

=== Exercises ===
The 35th FF Battalion participated in Cambrian Patrol and won Gold medal in 2010. Cambrian Patrol is a three-day military exercise organized by 160th (Wales) Brigade (part of 5th Infantry Division) of the British Army in Wales. The exercise involves various military drills including: Battle Procedure, Orders, Infiltration, Target Reconnaissance, Support to Friendly Forces, Battlefield Drills, Exfiltration, and Debriefing. The other participant countries include USA, Canada, Germany, France, India.

== Commanders ==
=== Colonels-in-chief ===
The officers of the regiment who are promoted to the designation of Chief of Army Staff are known as Colonels-in-chief. It is an honorary appointment. The FF regiment has only the following Colonels in Chief since its formation.

- King George VI, 1937-1952
- General Muhammad Musa HJ, HPk, HQA, MBE
- General Abdul Waheed Kakar, HI (M), SBt. 18 May 1993 – 17 May 1997
- General Raheel Sharif, NI (M) 29 November 2013 – 29 November 2016
- Field Marshal Syed Asim Munir Ahmad Shah, HI (M), 29 November 2023-present

=== Colonel commandants ===
The colonel commandant is an honorary designation given to the highest-ranked officer in service of the regiment. The Colonel Commandants since the creation of the regiment are listed below:

Colonel Commandants
Serial number	Name	Decorations	Term of Appointment	Unit
1	Major General Mian Hayaud Din	HJ, MBE, MC.	8 May 1954 – 6 May 1956	6 FF & 14 FF
2	Lieutenant General Khalid Masud Sheikh.	HI (M)	1 October 1957 – 30 June 1962	6 FF, 13 FF
3	General Muhammad Musa	HJ, HPk, HQA, MBE	1 October 1962 – 5 February 1965	1 FF
4	Lieutenant General Altaf Qadir	MBE	6 February 1965 – 27 August 1969	6 FF
5	Lieutenant General Attiqur Rahman	HPk, HQA, MC	28 August 1969 – 19 November 1973	6 FF
6	General Muhammad Iqbal Khan	NI (M), HI (M), SBt	21 August 1978 – 17 March 1985	2 FF
7	Lieutenant General Khushdil Khan Afridi	HI (M), SBt	18 March 1985 – 6 January 1986	10 FF, 12 FF & 18 FF
8	Lieutenant General Ahmed Kamal Khan	HI (M), SI (M), SBt	24 May 1987 – 23 May 1991	10 FF
9	Lieutenant General Imran Ullah Khan	HI (M), SI (M), SBt	24 May 1991 – 22 May 1995	5 FF & 40 FF
10	Lieutenant General Mumtaz Gul	HI (M), TBt	23 May 1995 – 24 April 1999	2 FF, 3 FF & 19 FF
11	Lieutenant General Tahir Ali Qureshi	HI (M), SBt	10 May 1999 – 16 May 2001	13 FF
12	Lieutenant General Mushtaq Hussain	HI (M)	17 May 2001 –	4 FF & 18 FF
13	Lieutenant General Munir Hafiez	HI (M)	– October 2005	7 FF
14	Lieutenant General Syed Sabahat Hussain	HI (M)	October 2005 – 5 May 2009	2 FF
15	Lieutenant General Ahmad Shuja Pasha	HI (M)	5 May 2009 – 19 March 2012	16 FF & 5 FF
16	Lieutenant General Alam Khattak	HI (M), TBt	19 March 2012 – 4 October 2013	14 FF
17	Lieutenant General Javed Iqbal	HI (M), TBt	14 June 2014 – 15 May 2015	9 FF
18	Lieutenant General Rizwan Akhtar	HI (M)	8 Oct 2015 - Sept 13, 2017	4 FF
19	Lieutenant General Ghayur Mahmood	HI (M), TBt	1 October 2017 - October 2018	18 FF
20	Major General Muhammad Zahid Khan	HI (M)	October 2018 - till date	11 FF
21	Field Marshal Syed Asim Munir Ahmed Shah	NI(M), HI (M), Sword of Honour	October 2021 - till date	23 FF

== Battle honours ==
Piffers have won many honours for their gallantry deeds in each battle. They were also awarded foreign medals before the independence of Pakistan, including Victoria Cross. The Pakistani medals and honours bestowed upon Piffers are listed here:

Honours & Awards
War	NH	HJ	SJ	TJ	Sitara-e-Basalat	Tamgha-e-Basalat
1948 War	–	3	9	166	–	–
1965 War	–	2	284	313	–	–
1971 War	2	2	34	44	–	–
Siachen	–	–	133	–	133	144
Kargil	–	–	8	2	1	3
Miscellaneous	–	–	5	–	62	107
Total	2	7	473	525	196	254

=== Nishan-e-Haider recipients ===
Nishan-e-Haider is the highest military award given posthumously for valour, in Pakistan. The recipients of Nishan-e-Haider from the Frontier Force Regiment are:

- Major Muhammad Akram (4th FF)

When the Indo-Pakistani War of 1971 broke out, Major Muhammad Akram was commanding a company of 4th FF Battalion. His company was involved in the Battle of Hilli. On the opposite side India had an Infantry brigade with the support of a tank squadron which were making way for the 20th Mountain Division. Major Akram and his men fought for a whole fortnight against enemy who was superior both in number and fire power. Hilli was the only battle sector where the fight continued even after the Fall of Dhaka on 16 December 1971. Major Akram died in action while defending in an epic manner after defying surrender. For his sacrifice he was posthumously awarded Nishan-e-Haider.

- Major Shabbir Sharif (6th FF)

On 3 December 1971, Major Shabbir Sharif who was commanding a company of 6th FF Regiment near Sulemanki headworks, was assigned the task of capturing the high ground overlooking the Gurmukh Khera and Beriwala villages in the Sulemanki sector. On the opposite side India had more than a company of the Assam Regiment which was supported by a squadron of tanks. Also among the hurdles were an enemy minefield and a defensive canal, 30 feet (9.1 m) wide and 10 feet (3.0 m) deep. Shabbir Sharif succeeded in capturing the area by early evening on 3 December. In this fight 43 Indian soldiers were killed, 28 were taken prisoner and four tanks were destroyed. Shabbir Sharif repelled repeated counterattacks by the opposing forces for the next three days and nights and kept strategically better position, holding two Indian battalions at bay. On the night of 5 December/ 6, during one of the enemy attacks, Sharif hopped out of his trench, killed the enemy Company Commander of 4th Jat Regiment and recovered important documents from his possession. In another attack on the morning of 6 December, Shabbir Sharif took over an anti-tank gun from his gunner, and while engaging enemy tanks, he was killed in action by a direct hit from a tank. Major Shabbir Sharif already a recipient of Sitara-e-Jurat, was posthumously awarded Nishan-e-Haider for his sacrifice.

=== Hilal-i-Jur'at recipients ===
Hilal-i-Jur'at is the second highest military award given for valour to Armed forces personnel of Pakistan. Piffers who received Hilal-i-Jur'at are:

- Major General Mian Hayaud Din
- General Muhammad Musa Khan
- Lieutenant Colonel Muhammad Akram Raja (Shaheed)
- Field Marshal Syed Asim Munir 23 FF

=== Sitara-e-Jurat recipients ===
Sitara-e-Jurat is the third highest military award given for valour to Armed forces personnel of Pakistan. Piffers who received Sitara-e-Jurat are:

- Major Muhammad Akbar Khan for Taitwal Sector 1948 (First recipient of SJ of Pakistan)
- Second Lieutenant Shabbir Sharif of 6 FF (for Chhamb Sector 1965)
- Captain Abdul Jalil (Shaheed) of 12 FF (for Sector 4 Kalidhar 1965)
- Brig Mir Ijaz Mehmood (Tony) of 23 FF (Rajistan Sadehwala sector 1965)
- Brigadier Muhammad Yamin Khokhar of 13 FF & 23 FF (1971 war)
- Lt Col Samin Jan Babar of 23 FF (SJ & Bar) (1965 & 1971)
- Captain Hassan Idrees of 23 FF (1971 War)
- Captain Mujeeb Faqrullah Khan of 25 FFR (for Chamb-Jorian Sector 1971)
- Lt. Col. Khalid Nazir, 40 FF/12 NLI/SSG (Kargil Sector 1999)
- Capt Ammar Hussain Shaheed, 63 FF- SSG (Kargil Sector 1999)
- Col Amir Nawaz Khan of 13 FF (1971 war)

=== VC recipients ===
The Victoria Cross is the highest battle order of Britain, awarded for valour. As the Frontier Force regiment still maintains the lineage of its predecessor regiments, so this award was received by following Piffers:

- General John Watson (1st Punjab Cavalry)
- General Dighton Probyn (2nd Punjab Cavalry)
- Captain Henry William Pitcher (1st Punjab Infantry (P.I.F))
- Lieutenant Walter Hamilton (Corps of Guides)
- Major General William John Vousden (5th Punjab Cavalry)
- Lieutenant Hector Lachlan Stewart MacLean (Guides)
- Lieutenant William Bruce (59th Scinde Rifles)
- Captain Eustace Jotham (51st Sikhs)
- Subadar Mir Dast (55th Coke's Rifles)
- Captain Godfrey Meynell (Guides)
- Lieutenant Colonel Arthur Edward Cumming (2nd bn 12th Frontier Force Regiment)
- Jemadar Prakash Singh Chib (14/13 Frontier Force Rifles)
- Havildar Ali Haidar (6th Royal bn 13th Frontier Force Rifles) later 1stFF

=== MC recipients ===
The Military Cross is the third highest battle honour of Britain, awarded for valour. The Frontier Force regiment still maintains the lineage of its predecessor regiments so this award was received by following Piffers:

- Major Amar Singh (1/12 Frontier Force Regiment)
- Major Himmat Singh Sandhu (1/12 Frontier Force Regiment)
- Jemadar Nurab Shah (1/12 Frontier Force Regiment)
- Major T. L. R. G. Dodwell (1/12 Frontier Force Regiment)
- Subadar Mansabdar Khan (1/12 Frontier Force Regiment)
- Captain Atta Ullah (1/12 Frontier Force Regiment)
- Jemadar Dhanna Singh (1/12 Frontier Force Regiment)
- Lieutenant Harbans Singh, I.A.M.C (1/12 Frontier Force Regiment)
- Major D. A. T. Wilson (1/12 Frontier Force Regiment)
- Jemadar Feroze Khan (1/12 Frontier Force Regiment)
- Major D. E. Redsull (1/12 Frontier Force Regiment)
- Subedar Sadhu Singh Malhi (1/12 Frontier Force Regiment)
- Major D. Monckton (1/12 Frontier Force Regiment)
- Jemadar Mohinder Singh (1/12 Frontier Force Regiment)
- Subadar Mian Gul (1/12 Frontier Force Regiment)
- Jemadar Amir Shah (1/12 Frontier Force Regiment)
- Major G. J. Hawkins (2/12 Frontier Force Regiment)
- Subedar-Major Rai Singh (2/12 Frontier Force Regiment)
- Captain J. M. Ricketts (2/12 Frontier Force Regiment)
- Jemadar Ram Singh (2/12 Frontier Force Regiment)
- Captain S. H. Raw (3/12 Frontier Force Regiment)
- Jemadar Neuroze Khan (3/12 Frontier Force Regiment)
- Captain D. C. R. Stewart (3/12 Frontier Force Regiment)
- Major N. O. Finnis (3/12 Frontier Force Regiment)
- Captain E. G. D. Heard (3/12 Frontier Force Regiment)
- Captain Buta Singh (3/12 Frontier Force Regiment)
- Captain L. B. H. Reford (3/12 Frontier Force Regiment)
- Jemadar Santa Singh (3/12 Frontier Force Regiment)
- Subedar Pahlwan Khan (3/12 Frontier Force Regiment)
- Field Marshal Sam Manekshaw (then Captain) (4/12 Frontier Force Regiment)
- Lieutenant G. F. Bond (4/12 Frontier Force Regiment)
- Major P. C. Gupta (4/12 Frontier Force Regiment)
- Major J. W. Peyton (4/12 Frontier Force Regiment)
- Jemadar Qaim Shah, I.D.S.M (4/12 Frontier Force Regiment)
- Jemadar Udham Singh (4/12 Frontier Force Regiment)
- Jemadar Gul Mohd (4/12 Frontier Force Regiment)
- Subadar Bakhtawar Singh (4/12 Frontier Force Regiment)
- Captain P. Stewart (4/12 Frontier Force Regiment)
- Lieutenant General Attiqur Rahman (then Major) (4/12 Frontier Force Regiment)
- Jemadar Narain Singh (4/12 Frontier Force Regiment)
- Jemadar Phagga Singh (4/12 Frontier Force Regiment)
- Subadar Sultan Ali (4/12 Frontier Force Regiment)
- Subadar Bika Ram (4/12 Frontier Force Regiment)
- Subadar Mada Mir (4/12 Frontier Force Regiment)
- Major Amrik Singh (4/12 Frontier Force Regiment)
- Jemadar Nur Khan (5/12 Frontier Force Regiment)
- Jemadar Bakhtawar Singh (8/12 Frontier Force Regiment)
- Major D. D. Slattery (8/12 Frontier Force Regiment)
- Captain P. H. Meadows (8/12 Frontier Force Regiment)
- Lieutenant T. R. Walton (9/12 Frontier Force Regiment)
- Subadar Tarlochan Chand (9/12 Frontier Force Regiment)
- Captain A. M. Khan (9/12 Frontier Force Regiment)
- Captain J. D. Gosling (9/12 Frontier Force Regiment)
- Major General Mian Hayaud Din(9/12 Frontier Force Regiment)
- Jemadar Sultan Ahmed Khan (9/12 Frontier Force Regiment)
- Subadar Kartar Singh (9/12 Frontier Force Regiment)
- Major N. C. Rawlley (9/12 Frontier Force Regiment)
- Jemadar Ram Singh (9/12 Frontier Force Regiment)
- Captain Kehar Singh Rai (9/12 Frontier Force Regiment)
- Captain M. J. Moynihan (9/12 Frontier Force Regiment)
- Major D. G. Butterworth (9/12 Frontier Force Regiment)
- Jemadar Kishen Singh (9/12 Frontier Force Regiment)
- Major C. G. Ferguson (9/12 Frontier Force Regiment)
- Major J. W. Hodges (Machine-gun Battalion/12 Frontier Force Regiment)
- Captain R. H. Plant( Machine-gun Battalion/12 Frontier Force Regiment)
- Subadar Karam Singh (Machine-gun Battalion/12 Frontier Force Regiment)
- Major General Adam Khan
- Lieutenant General Rakhman Gul Afridi (then Major) ((2/13 Frontier Force Rifles))
- Lieutenant General Bakhtiar Rana (then Major) (6/13 Frontier Force Rifles)

=== Order of British India ===
The Order of British India was awarded by the Viceroy of India for long, faithful and honourable service by Viceroy's Commissioned (i.e. native Indian) Officers in the Indian Army. The Frontier Force regiment still maintains the lineage of its predecessor regiments so this award was received by following Piffers:

- Honorary Captain Fateh Muhammad, Sardar Bahadur, O.B.I, I.O.M (3/12 Frontier Force Regiment)

=== Legion d'Honneur recipients ===
Commandeur of the Légion d'honneur, the third of the five classes of the Légion d'honneur was awarded by the Republic of France for securing areas of Indo-China in 1946. The only Piffer to have received this distinction:

- Major General Mian Hayaud Din

=== Legion of Merit recipients ===
This is the highest military decoration that may be bestowed by the US Government upon a foreign national. Piffers who received the Legion of Merit are:

- Major General Mian Hayaud Din
- Major General Mian Ghulam Jilani
- Lieutenant General Raheel Sharif

=== Member of the Order of the British Empire (M.B.E.) – Military ===
This is the fourth class of the Order of the British Empire. Piffers who received the military division of the MBE are:

- Major General Mian Hayaud Din
- Lieutenant General Altaf Qadir
- General Muhammad Musa

== Motto and colours ==
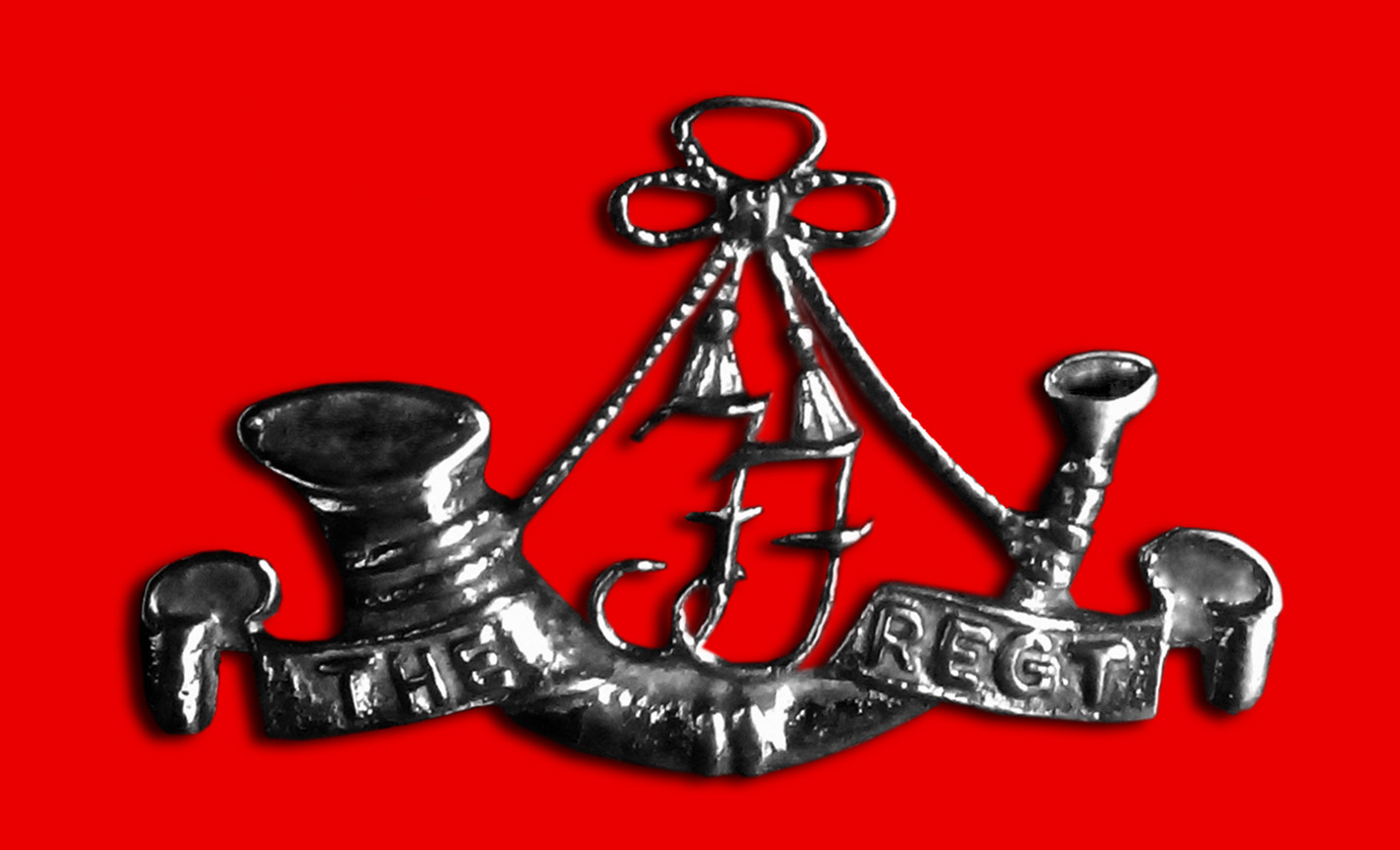
The cap badge of the Frontier Force Regiment

The motto of the regiment is Labbaik, an Arabic word, which means Here I Come, which is prayed as part of the Islamic Talbiyah. It is commonly used as an invocation to respond to Allah's call for pilgrimage during Hajj, the annual Muslim pilgrimage to Mecca. Before 1970, each Piffer unit had its own motto but on the whole the regiment had no motto, so it was decided at the Piffer Conference in 1970 to adopt Labbaik as the regimental motto. The official meaning of this motto is:

—making all preparations required for going to battle, and putting ones heart and soul into the endeavour, aimed at achieving the assigned mission.

Piffers wear the same basic khaki uniform as in other regiments in the Pakistan Army, although the rank colour differs with Piffer personnel wearing rank insignia that are black with a red background. They also wear a badge on the shoulder strap of the uniform with "FF Regiment" written of it that uses the same colour combination. The colour of the Piffers' beret is rifle green with the insignia of the regiment at front. The Sam Browne belt worn by members of the regiment, which was designed by General Sir Sam Browne, is black in colour. The battle dress uniform worn by the regiment is camouflage without any distinctions since inception of new CCD.

== Alliances ==
- United Kingdom – Argyll and Sutherland Highlanders; 1st Bn
- United Kingdom – The Duke of Lancaster's Regiment (King's Lancashire and Border); 1st and 15th Bn
- Canada – The Argyll and Sutherland Highlanders of Canada (Princess Louise's); 1st Bn
- United Kingdom – The Rifles; 2nd and 13th Bn
- United Kingdom – The Royal Welsh; 3rd Bn
- United Kingdom – Royal Anglian Regiment; 5th Bn
- United Kingdom – Royal Irish Regiment (27th (Inniskilling) 83rd, 87th and Ulster Defence Regiment); 9th Bn
- Jordan – 4th Royal Mechanised Battalion, the Royal Jordanian Army (Prince Hasan Bin Talal’s Own); 14th Bn
- Canada – The King's Own Calgary Regiment; 15th Bn

== See also ==
- Punjab Regiment
- Baloch Regiment
- Azad Kashmir Regiment
- Sind Regiment
- Northern Light Infantry Regiment
- Mujahid Force

== Bibliography ==
- Major General M Hayaud Din (1950). One Hundred Glorious Years. Civil & Military Gazette Limited.
- Brigadier W. E. H. Condon (1953). The Frontier Force Rifles. Gale & Polden Limited.
- Brigadier W. E. H. Condon (1962). The Frontier Force Regiment. Gale & Polden Limited.
- Lieutenant General Attiqur Rahman (1980). The Wardens of the Marches. Wajidalis.
- John Gaylor (1993). Sons of John Company: The Indian and Pakistan Armies 1903–91. Lancer International.
- Capt. C. W. May (1933). History of the Second Sikhs, 12th Frontier Force Regiment 1846–1933. Mission Press Jubbulpore.
- Capt. S. R. Shirley (1915). History of the 54th Sikhs, Frontier Force Regiment 1846–1914. Gale & Polden.
- Col. H. C. Wylly (1930). The History of Coke's Rifles. Gale & Polden.
- Mohammad Nawaz Khan (1996). The glorious piffers, 1843–1995. The Frontier Force Regimental Centre. ASIN B0006FBFNU.
