= Chief of Defence Forces (Pakistan) =

Highest-ranking officer of the Pakistan Armed Forces

- Emblem of the Chief of the Defence Forces

- Flag of the Chief of the Defence Forces

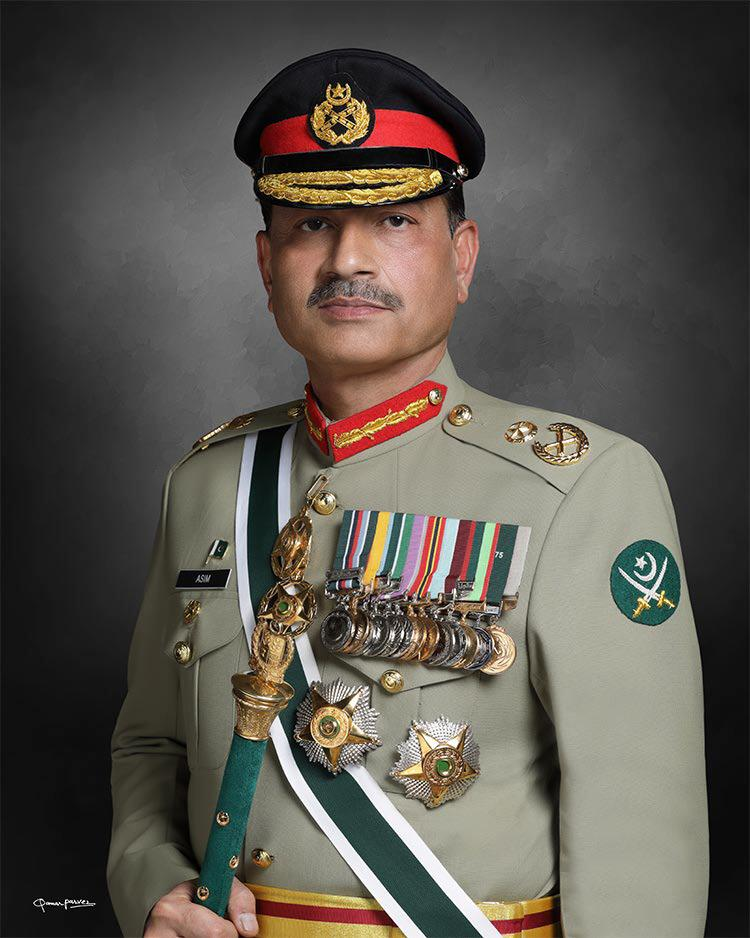
- Incumbent; Field Marshal; Asim Munir since 4 December 2025
- Pakistan Armed Forces
- Abbreviation: CDF
- Member of: Pakistan Army
- Reports to: Prime Minister of Pakistan
- Residence: Joint Staff Headquarters (Rawalpindi Cantonment)
- Seat: Rawalpindi, Punjab
- Nominator: Prime Minister of Pakistan
- Appointer: President of Pakistan
- Term length: 5 years; (renewable once)
- Constituting instrument: Constitution of Pakistan (Article 243, 27th Amendment)
- Precursor: Chairman Joint Chiefs of Staff Committee (abolished)
- Inaugural holder: Asim Munir

The Chief of Defence Forces (CDF) is a statutory office and the highest-ranking military position within the Pakistan Armed Forces, held ex officio by the Chief of the Army Staff. The post was established under the 27th Amendment to the Constitution of Pakistan, which amended Article 243 to replace the long-standing role of the Chairman Joint Chiefs of Staff Committee (CJCSC) with a single, unified command position.

The creation of the CDF abolished the position of the CJCSC following the retirement of its last officeholder (General Sahir Shamshad Mirza) on 27 November 2025, introducing a unified command structure across the armed services. Under the new constitutional framework, the CDF is appointed by the President of Pakistan on the advice of the Prime Minister. The first and incumbent CDF is Asim Munir, serving in this capacity since 4 December 2025.

== History ==
The office was created to centralise operational authority of the Pakistan Army, Pakistan Navy and Pakistan Air Force under a single constitutional post. The Twenty-seventh Amendment to the Constitution abolished the Chairman Joint Chiefs of Staff Committee (CJCSC) and provided for the establishment of a Chief of Defence Forces. Until its abolition on 27 November 2025, the CJCSC functioned as the principal tri-service coordinator.

Following the retirement of the CJCSC, speculation emerged following a delay in the notification meant to appoint the incumbent Army Chief as CDF. On 30 November 2025, Defence Minister Khawaja Asif dismissed the rumors as "unnecessary and irresponsible speculation". He confirmed that the appointment process had been initiated and stated that the notification would be issued "in due course" following the Prime Minister's return to Pakistan.

After a five-day delay, the government issued the notification on 5 December 2025, appointing Field Marshal Syed Asim Munir Ahmed Shah as the first Chief of Defence Forces alongside his position as COAS, resetting his tenure to a new five-year term.

In August 2026, Pakistan's National Assembly passed the Defence Forces Act 2026 by a majority vote. The opposition boycotted the voting process and walked out of the assembly in protest.

== Role and responsibilities ==
The CDF is appointed by the President of Pakistan on the advice of the Prime Minister. The CDF is charged with command of the three service branches, the Pakistan Army, Pakistan Navy, and Pakistan Air Force, as well as oversight of the National Strategic Command. The amendment also grants the occupant of the post constitutional protections and consolidates the appointment powers of service chiefs under a unified command structure.

The Defence Forces Act 2026 grants the CDF powers to retire, release or dismiss personnel, except those appointed under Article 243 of the Constitution. The CDF can also approve or reject resignations, retain personnel in service and reduce the retirement age or prescribed term of service of a person.

== Appointees ==
No.	Portrait	Name and Rank	Took Office	Left Office	Time in Office	Unit and Course of Commission	Awards
1.		Field Marshal Asim Munir	4 December 2025	Incumbent	341 days	23 Frontier Force Regiment; 17 OTS Course	Hilal-e-Jurat; Hilal-e-Imtiaz (Military); Nishan-e-Imtiaz (Military); Sword of Honour
