= Asim Munir =

Chief of Defence Forces and Chief of the Army Staff of Pakistan (born 1968)

Asim Munir NI(M) HJ HI(M)
- عاصم منیر
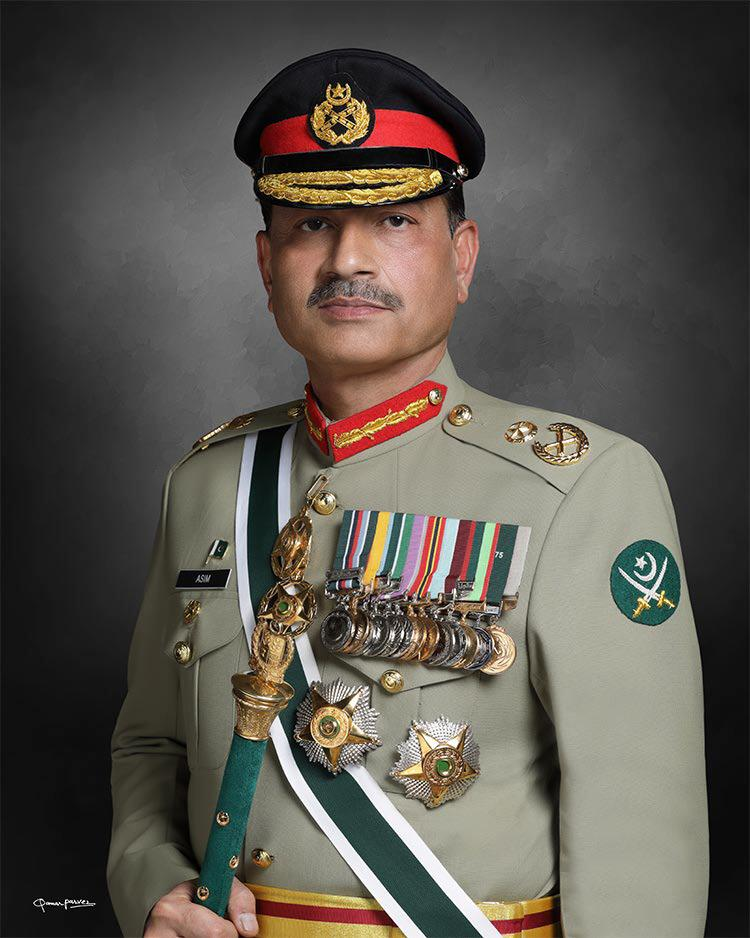
- Official portrait, c. 2025
- Born: Syed Asim Munir Ahmed Shah; 1968 (age 57–58); Rawalpindi, West Pakistan, Pakistan
- Education: Officers Training School; Command and Staff College Quetta; National Defence University
- Spouse: Syeda Irum Asim
- Children: 3
- Military career
- Branch: Pakistan
- Service years: 1986 – present
- Rank: Field Marshal
- Unit: Frontier Force Regiment
- Commands: Chief of Defence Forces; Chief of the Army Staff; Quartermaster General; XXX Corps; Director-General of Inter-Services Intelligence; Director-General of Military Intelligence; Force Command Northern Areas
- Conflicts: Insurgency in Balochistan; 2024 Iran–Pakistan border skirmishes; 2025 India-Pakistan conflict; Operation Bunyan-um-Marsoos
- Awards: See list

Field Marshal Syed Asim Munir Ahmed Shah (Note: Urdu: سید عاصم منیر احمد شاہ) (born 1968) NI(M) HJ HI(M) is a Pakistani military officer who is currently serving as Pakistan's first Chief of Defence Forces (CDF) and the 11th Chief of the Army Staff (COAS) of the Pakistan Army concurrently. Prior to becoming the COAS, he was posted at the GHQ as quartermaster general. He is the first army chief of Pakistan who has previously headed both the Military Intelligence and Inter-Services Intelligence.

During his early military career, he was posted in Saudi Arabia, where he memorised the Quran and became a hafiz. He received the Sword of Honour for his performance as a cadet in the Officers Training School (OTS), Mangla. He commanded the XXX Corps in Gujranwala from 17 June 2019 to 6 October 2021. He served as the 28th Director-General of the ISI until he was replaced by Lieutenant General Faiz Hameed on 16 June 2019. On 20 May 2025, Munir was promoted to the rank of Field Marshal for his leadership during the 2025 India–Pakistan conflict, becoming the second-ever person to attain the rank in Pakistan's history after Ayub Khan, and the only field marshal to serve as the Chief of Army Staff simultaneously.

Munir is a recipient of the Hilal-e-Jurat, Pakistan's second-highest gallantry award. On 4 December 2025, he was appointed the first Chief of Defence Forces (CDF) of the Pakistan Armed Forces. The post is a dual-hatted role held concurrently with the COAS, with his tenure as COAS recommencing for a five-year term from the date of the CDF notification. Munir's tenure as army chief has included involvement in domestic stability measures, economic initiatives such as the Special Investment Facilitation Council, and regional diplomacy, including mediation efforts during the 2026 Iran war.

== Early life and education ==
Syed Asim Munir Ahmed Shah was born in Rawalpindi, Punjab, Pakistan in 1968. His father was a schoolteacher and also an imam. Munir received his early religious education at the Markazi Madrasah Dar-ul-Tajweed. He was also a local cricketer, playing as a fast bowler.

Munir graduated from the JGSDF Camp Takigahara in Japan, the Command and Staff College, Quetta, the Malaysian Armed Forces College, Kuala Lumpur and the National Defence University, Islamabad, where he earned his MPhil in Public Policy and Strategic Security Management.

== Military career ==
Munir is from the 17th course of the Officers Training School (OTS) in Mangla and was commissioned into the 23rd Battalion of the Frontier Force Regiment. He was also awarded the Sword of Honour upon passing out from the Officers Training School. During his early military career, he was posted in Saudi Arabia, where he memorised the Quran and became a hafiz. While serving as a brigadier, Munir commanded troops in the Force Command Northern Areas and an infantry brigade in the Northern Areas of Pakistan.

He was appointed Director-General of Military Intelligence in 2016. He was awarded the Hilal-e-Imtiaz in March 2018. Munir was appointed the DG-ISI on 25 October 2018. He served in this capacity until 16 June 2019, a tenure of eight months. He was subsequently appointed as corps commander of XXX Corps. From 2021 to November 2022, Lt-General Munir was posted at GHQ as the Quartermaster General of Pakistan Army.

=== Chief of Army Staff (2022–present) ===
In November 2022, Munir was promoted to the four-star general rank and appointed as the Chief of the Army Staff of the Pakistan Army. Munir was scheduled to retire on 27 November 2022. Before his appointment as Chief of Army Staff (COAS), he submitted his retirement application which was subsequently rejected by the Ministry of Defense, he was informed that the government had decided to retain him in service. Following informal consultations involving Nawaz Sharif, the brother of Prime Minister Shehbaz Sharif, Munir was appointed the COAS on 24 November 2022. The summary for his appointment was forwarded by Prime Minister Shehbaz Sharif to President Arif Alvi, who signed and approved it on the same day. Munir assumed the role of COAS on 29 November 2022, two days after his initially scheduled retirement. Munir's selection as COAS was from a pool of six eligible candidates. Munir is the first army chief of Pakistan who has previously headed both the Military Intelligence and Inter-Services Intelligence.

In December 2022, he was conferred the Nishan-e-Imtiaz (Military) by President Arif Alvi.

In November 2024, Pakistan's parliament extended the service terms of the heads of the armed forces, including Army Chief Munir, from three to five years, ensuring that Munir would remain in office until November 2027. The legislation was passed amid protests from PTI lawmakers, who argued that the government had rushed the measure without proper debate. According to Geo News, cited by Reuters, it took 16 minutes for the Senate to pass the amendment into law, which PTI lawmaker Omar Ayub described as "bulldozing" the legislation without debate in either house.

After the May 9 riots, Munir vowed that such orchestrated incidents against the army and the nation would not be allowed again. He announced that the "legal process of trial against planners, instigators, abettors and perpetrators involved in the May 9 tragedy has commenced under Pakistan Army Act and Official Secrets Act".

==== Economic initiatives ====
During the Kakar caretaker government's nationwide crackdown on illegal dollar smuggling, unlawful currency transfers, and commodity hoarding, Munir, as Chief of Army Staff, participated in high-level briefings with provincial officials and stated that the crackdown on smuggling and other illegal activities would continue. The crackdown coincided with a recovery in the Pakistani rupee, which rose from a record low of 308 to the dollar and became the world's best-performing currency in September 2023.

The same month, in meetings with business leaders, he emphasised the role of the Special Investment Facilitation Council (SIFC) in addressing Pakistan's economic challenges, highlighting its potential to attract up to $100 billion in investment from countries such as Saudi Arabia, the UAE, Kuwait, and other Gulf allies. He also announced the creation of task forces on economic and sectoral matters, assured that money exchanges would be brought under taxation to improve transparency in dollar exchange and interbank rates, and said that Pakistan's grey economy was two to three times larger than the documented economy. He facilitated multi-billion-dollar investment agreements with the UAE through the SIFC, covering sectors such as energy, port operations, wastewater treatment, food security, logistics, mining, aviation, and banking.

=== Field Marshal (2025–present) ===
In the aftermath of the 2025 India–Pakistan conflict, the Government of Pakistan promoted Munir to the rank of Field Marshal on 20 May 2025, making him the second individual in Pakistan's history to attain the rank after Ayub Khan. His promotion as Field Marshal also makes him the first and only military commander in the history of Pakistan to occupy the office of the Chief of the Army Staff (COAS) with the rank of Field Marshal (five-star General), which is a historical departure from a tradition where the COAS often holds a four-star General rank. Ayub Khan, who was Pakistan's first Field Marshal, abandoned his office of the Chief of the Army Staff after his promotion as Field Marshal.

The elevation was approved unanimously by the federal cabinet in recognition of his leadership during Operation Bunyanum Marsoos, which the government credited with repelling Indian aggression and ensuring national security. Prime Minister Shehbaz Sharif commended Munir's "exemplary courage and resolve" during the operation. According to Inter-Services Public Relations (ISPR), Munir dedicated the honour to the people of Pakistan, the armed forces, and particularly to the martyrs and veterans.

In June 2025, Munir became the first Pakistani army chief to be hosted for lunch by a serving U.S. president, Donald Trump, without simultaneously holding the office of the country's head of state. Trump credited Munir with playing a key role in defusing the 2025 India–Pakistan conflict, preventing escalation to a potential nuclear confrontation. According to U.S. Central Command chief Michael Kurilla, Munir personally coordinated with U.S. officials on counterterrorism operations, including the arrest of the Abbey Gate bombing suspect in Kabul. Munir accompanied Prime Minister Shehbaz Sharif to Riyadh for the signing of the Strategic Mutual Defence Agreement between Pakistan and Saudi Arabia in September 2025. In October 2025, Trump referred to him as "my favourite field marshal" during a peace summit in Egypt.

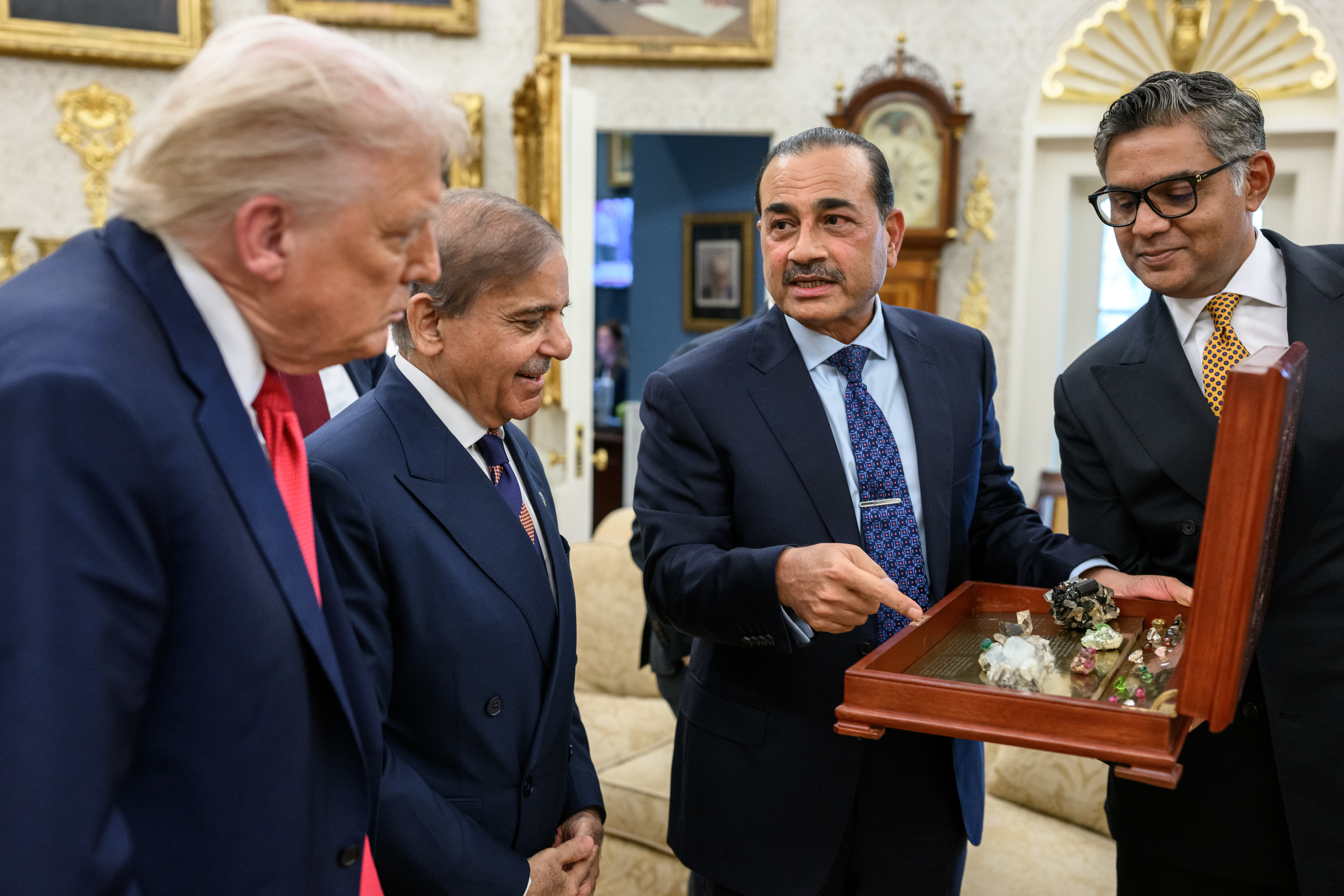
Munir displaying rare-earth minerals to US President Donald Trump, September 2025

In November 2025, under the Twenty-seventh Amendment to the Constitution of Pakistan, the title of field marshal was granted lifelong legal immunity, which extended to Munir by virtue of his office.

=== Chief of Defence Forces ===
On 4 December 2025, President Asif Ali Zardari appointed Munir as Pakistan's first Chief of Defence Forces (CDF) after approving a summary forwarded by Prime Minister Shehbaz Sharif. The position was created under the Twenty-seventh Amendment to the Constitution of Pakistan and replaced the abolished office of the Chairman of the Joint Chiefs of Staff Committee, which formally ceased to exist on 27 November 2025. The CDF post is a dual-hatted role combined with the office of the Chief of Army Staff. Munir was appointed to hold both offices concurrently for a period of five years, with his tenure as army chief deemed to have recommenced from the date of notification of the CDF appointment.

In April 2026, Pakistan played a mediating role between Iran and the United States amid 2026 Iran war. Prime Minister Shehbaz Sharif tasked Munir with maintaining behind-the-scenes contacts with American and Iranian political and military leadership in an effort to de-escalate the crisis. On 6 April 2026, it was reported that Munir has been in contact "all night long" with U.S. Vice President JD Vance, U.S. special envoy Steve Witkoff and Iranian Foreign Minister Abbas Araqchi. The mediation contributed to rare face-to-face talks between U.S. and Iranian delegations in Islamabad, although no formal agreement was reached. Munir also travelled to Tehran on 15 April 2026 to facilitate efforts toward a second round of negotiations.

In August 2026, Munir accompanied Prime Minister Shehbaz Sharif during his visit to Saudi Arabia, where Pakistan, Saudi Arabia and Turkey signed the Mecca Defence Alliance.

== Personal life ==
American foreign policy analyst Michael Kugelman described Munir as "deeply religious". He memorised the entire Quran during his posting in Saudi Arabia as a Lieutenant-Colonel. He is the first army chief in Pakistan's history to have memorised the entire Quran.

Munir is a keen sportsman, an avid reader, and a traveller.

== Views ==
=== Stance regarding religious extremism ===
He has stressed the need for combating Islamic extremism and providing a safe nation for Pakistan's religious minorities.

=== Foreign policy ===
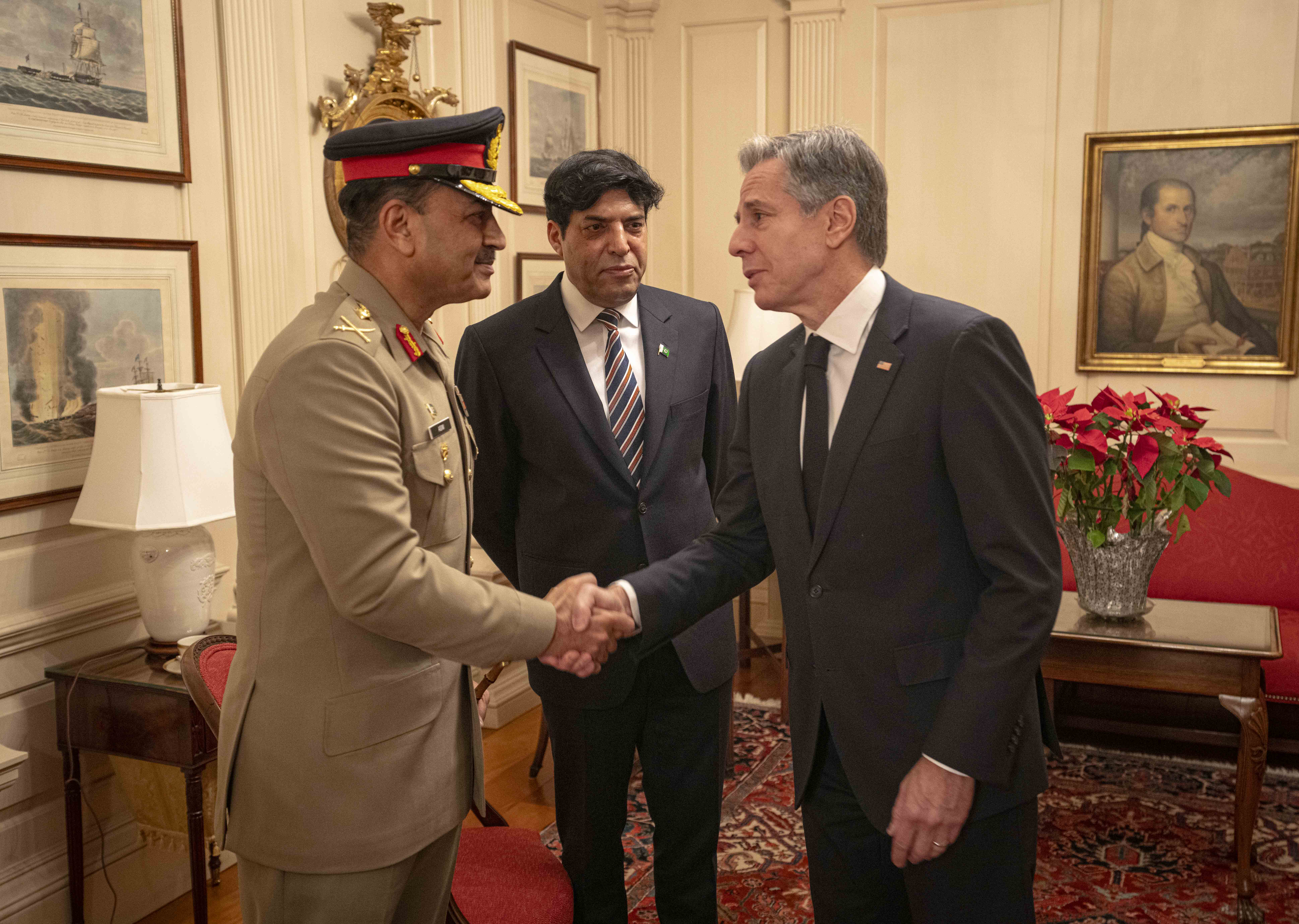
Munir and Director-General of Inter-Services Intelligence Nadeem Anjum with US Secretary of State Antony Blinken, December 2023

Munir's foreign policy, or "the Munir doctrine", has been described as trying to shift away from the traditional choice between the United States and China as a primary geopolitical partner, and centred around three key points: to have a softer image of Pakistan, to transform it into a regional middle power, especially as a security actor, and to prioritize geoeconomics over geopolitics.

He has been critical of Pakistan's neighbours, arguing that Afghanistan did not support Pakistan's admission to the United Nations following independence and has historically supported the insurgency in Balochistan. Regarding India, he stated that "India has not reconciled with the concept of Pakistan, then how can we reconcile with them?"

=== "Pakistan first" policy ===
Munir is described as having a "Pakistan first" policy, taking a defensive stance against many of Pakistan's adversaries. After the 2024 Iran–Pakistan border skirmishes, Munir reiterated that Pakistan would respond to such altercations, stating that "You [Iran] cannot backstab us, and if you do, you will get a befitting reply."

In October 2023, Munir highlighted the importance of national security while discussing the imminent deportation of illegal immigrants, including an estimated 1.7 million illegal Afghan nationals.

He has also stated that Pakistan should be prioritised over Afghanistan, even stating that "when it comes to the safety and security of every single Pakistani, the whole of Afghanistan can be damned."

=== Social conservatism ===
While speaking to a gathering of students from various public and private sector universities of the country, Munir appeared as a social conservative, warning the youth against social media and Westernization, eventually asking that "If we want to adopt Western civilization, then why did we get rid of Hindu civilization?".

=== Freedom of expression ===
In May 2024, Munir expressed concerns regarding "negative propaganda" on social media platforms and affirmed the military's readiness to address any threats or conspiracies. He also strongly denounced the dissemination of "disinformation" in Pakistan's cyberspace. Munir emphasized that the military understands its constitutional boundaries, and he urged others to also abide by the limits outlined in the constitution. He pointed to Article 19 of the Constitution of Pakistan, which delineates restrictions on freedom of expression, including the prohibition of incitement to violence and attempts to undermine the integrity, security, or defense of Pakistan, among other provisions.

In November 2024, a statement from state broadcaster PTV recorded Munir as saying "Unrestricted freedom of speech is leading to the degradation of moral values in all societies." He further said "[w]hile technology has enhanced access to knowledge, it has also facilitated the rapid spread of misinformation and hateful narratives, destabilizing political and social structures globally".

=== Social media ===
In April 2024, Munir warned that negative propaganda and social media trolls would not be able to deter them. In May 2024, he cautioned that "inimical" forces and their supporters had unleashed "digital terrorism" and were intensifying efforts to sow discord between the Pakistan Armed Forces and the public by spreading "lies, fake news, and propaganda."

In August 2024, Munir warned that social media was being exploited to propagate "anarchy." His remarks that "Anarchy is spread through social media" followed a condemnation by the ISPR of social media campaigns to target the Pakistan Armed Forces. He also issued a warning against efforts to incite chaos within the country. The Tribune (India) highlighted that his comments followed social media posts drawing parallels between Pakistan's current situation and the downfall of Sheikh Hasina's government in Bangladesh.

On 14 August, while addressing a parade on country's Independence Day, Munir reiterated his criticism of social media, warning that it was being used to spread chaos and false information targeting the Pakistan Armed Forces. He also attributed this "digital terrorism" to foreign elements.

On 21 August, Munir stated that it is the state's duty to shield the public from the adverse effects of social media-driven "hysteria" and "fitna." Dawn reported that this statement was part of a series of warnings from Munir and the Pakistani military concerning the potential "dangers" with social media.

=== Two-nation theory ===
On 17 April 2025, Munir publicly endorsed the two-nation theory, saying:

Our forefathers thought we are different from Hindus in every possible aspect of life. Our religions are different, our customs are different, our traditions are different, our thoughts are different, our ambitions are different. That was the foundation of the two-nation theory that was laid there. We are two nations, we are not one nation.

On 26 April 2025, Munir reiterated his views on the two-nation theory while speaking at a passing out parade ceremony at the Pakistan Military Academy, saying, "the two-nation theory was based on the fundamental belief that Muslims and Hindus are two separate nations, not one."

=== Indus Waters Treaty ===
In August 2025, during a black-tie dinner in Tampa, Florida, Munir warned that Pakistan would never allow India to choke the Indus River, vowing to destroy any dam New Delhi sought to build, and declared that "the Indus River is not the Indians' family property."

=== Pakistani diaspora ===
In August 2025, Munir described the Pakistani diaspora as a "source of pride and dignity," rejecting the term "brain drain" and instead referring to it as a "brain gain."

== Public image ==
In November 2024, Michael Kugelman, director of the South Asia Institute at Washington's Wilson Center, described the extension of Munir's tenure as army chief as a move that strengthens "the most powerful post in Pakistan." He warned on X that "when a legislature is reduced to a rubber stamp, democracy is never a winner."

In 2025, Munir, was recognized among the world's 500 most influential Muslims by The Muslim 500, an annual publication by the Royal Islamic Strategic Studies Centre in Amman, Jordan.

In June 2025, Ashok Swain, professor of peace and conflict research at Uppsala University, wrote that Munir had undergone a dramatic shift in public perception within Pakistan. Swain said that until May 2025, Munir was regarded as "perhaps the most reviled Pakistani army chief since the 1971 war" due to his role in the crackdown on former prime minister Imran Khan and the Pakistan Tehreek-e-Insaf party. According to Swain, following Pakistan's military response to Indian airstrikes across the Line of Control in May 2025, Munir experienced "a political resurrection" and was portrayed domestically as a defender of national sovereignty.

In reference to Munir's meeting with U.S. President Donald Trump in June 2025, Raza Rumi of the City University of New York said the meeting validated a military-to-military track in U.S.-Pakistan relations while bypassing the civilian government, thereby undermining efforts towards democratic consolidation. He added that such developments reinforced the perception of military dominance in national decision-making, characterising the reset in ties as one where "khaki once again trumps ballot."

After the Twenty-seventh Amendment to the Constitution of Pakistan was enacted, military expert Ayesha Siddiqa said that Munir had "brought control of the military under himself." She further said that while the current military establishment's actions have been more subtle, they could have far-reaching consequences, as Field Marshal Munir is now expected to retain his title for life. According to her, this does not constitute a formal declaration of martial law but, in effect, represents an even more direct form of military rule.

The Economist wrote in July 2026 that after being appointed as military chief, Munir "secured his grip on the army, elevating himself to the post of field marshal." In November 2026, Munir shared the top ranking on The 500 Most Influential Muslims.

== Controversies ==
=== Removal as DG-ISI ===
It was alleged that Munir was removed as DG-ISI in 2019 by then-Prime Minister Imran Khan over investigations into corruption involving Khan's wife, Bushra Bibi. Khan denied these allegations in a post on X in May 2023, saying: "This is completely false. Neither did Gen Asim show me any proof of my wife's corruption, nor did I make him resign because of that." In July 2025, Khan alleged that Munir tried to send a message to his wife through Zulfi Bukhari while being removed as DG-ISI. He said: "She firmly refused to meet."

=== Allegations by Imran Khan ===
On 6 April 2024, Imran Khan alleged that a "London plan" had been devised between Munir and Nawaz Sharif, involving judges and linked to what he described as the theft of the democratic mandate. On 17 April, Khan blamed Munir for the incarceration of his wife Bushra Bibi, who had been convicted in a corruption case and in a case relating to the illegality of her marriage to Khan. She was being held at her residence in Bani Gala, Islamabad.

In July 2025, Khan alleged that Munir was directly responsible for the treatment he and his wife received in prison. In a post on X, Khan claimed that a jail superintendent and a military officer were acting under Munir's orders. Khan further alleged that Munir harbored a personal grudge stemming from an incident during his premiership, in which Bibi refused to meet Munir after he allegedly attempted to contact her through a party member.

In March 2025, US congressmen Joe Wilson (R-S.C.) and Jimmy Panetta (D-Calif.) introduced a bipartisan bill in the US House of Representatives called the "Pakistan Democracy Act". The bill called for sanctions on Munir and others for persecuting political opponents, such as former Prime Minister Imran Khan. Pakistan Today described the bill as an "exercise in futility" and explained why the bill was unlikely to become law.

=== Allegations of interference in judiciary ===
In his 2020 book, The Battle for Pakistan, Shuja Nawaz stated that Munir "was reported to have been behind the sacking of a high court judge who had been critical of the ISI." However, Shaukat Aziz Siddiqui clarified that his removal occurred before Munir's appointment as ISI head and attributed his sacking to former Chief Justices Saqib Nisar and Asif Saeed Khosa, and then-DG-C ISI Major General Faiz Hameed. Siddiqui stated that Shuja Nawaz's account was incorrect and emphasized that Munir was not involved in his dismissal.

=== Allegations of nepotism and alleged abduction ===
On 17 March 2025, Ahmad Noorani published a report alleging that relatives and close associates of Munir had interfered in key government appointments, securing top positions despite lacking merit or performance. The next day, about 20 armed men who identified themselves as police raided Noorani's family home and forcibly took away his two brothers to an undisclosed location. Reporters Without Borders (RSF) described the abduction as likely an act of retaliation for Noorani's reporting, while the Committee to Protect Journalists said that Noorani and his family's court petition linked the brothers' disappearance to his report. RSF further reported that local police denied any involvement.

On 20 April 2025, journalist Umar Cheema claimed, citing senior police officers, that Noorani's brothers had been recovered from Katcha dacoits.

=== Alleged threats against India ===
According to the Indian online newspaper ThePrint, Munir allegedly said, "We are a nuclear nation; if we think we are going down, we'll take half the world down with us." He further said, "We'll start from India's East, where they have located their most valuable resources, and then move westwards." Indian Ministry of External Affairs spokesperson Randhir Jaiswal said: "Nuclear sabre-rattling is Pakistan's stock-in-trade," and added, "The international community can draw its own conclusions on the irresponsibility inherent in such remarks." Reuters, in reporting on India's response to the alleged nuclear remarks, said that only an excerpt of Munir's speech was released by Pakistani security officials and it did not contain the nuclear-related statements. Furthermore, it said that it could not independently verify the remarks. While Indian officials argued that it was irresponsible on Pakistan's part to make such statements in a "third friendly country", Pakistan's Foreign Office said that the statements were "distorted." An excerpt of his speech shared by Pakistani security officials did not contain any such remarks, while Pakistan's foreign office said the Indian MEA's statement was "yet another demonstration of their chronic tendency to distorting facts and twisting statements out of context."

According to The Times of India, Munir allegedly said that he had authorised a social media post combining a Quranic verse from Surah al-Fil with a picture of Mukesh Ambani, "to show them what we will do the next time." The report added that he warned Pakistan would target India's oil installations, specifically naming the Jamnagar Refinery, in a future conflict. According to the Indian media outlet NDTV, Munir allegedly said, "I am going to use a crude analogy to explain the situation...India is a shining Mercedes coming on a highway like a Ferrari, but we are a dump truck full of gravel. If the truck hits the car, who is going to be the loser?"

=== Alleged comments on May 9 riots ===
In August 2025, Daily Jang editor Suhail Warraich claimed that, during a stopover in Brussels, Munir said that political reconciliation is possible only if there is a sincere apology, without specifying whom he was referring to. The comment was interpreted as possibly referring to the Pakistan Tehreek-e-Insaf (PTI), which the state holds responsible for the May 9 riots. Inter-Services Public Relations DG Lt Gen Ahmed Sharif Chaudhry later denied that Munir gave any interview or made any political statement and said that he did not mention the PTI.

== Dates of promotion ==
Insignia	Rank	Date	Ref
	Field Marshal	May 2025	
	General	November 2022	
	Lieutenant General	September 2018	
	Major General	February 2014	
	Second Lieutenant	April 1986	

== Awards and decorations ==

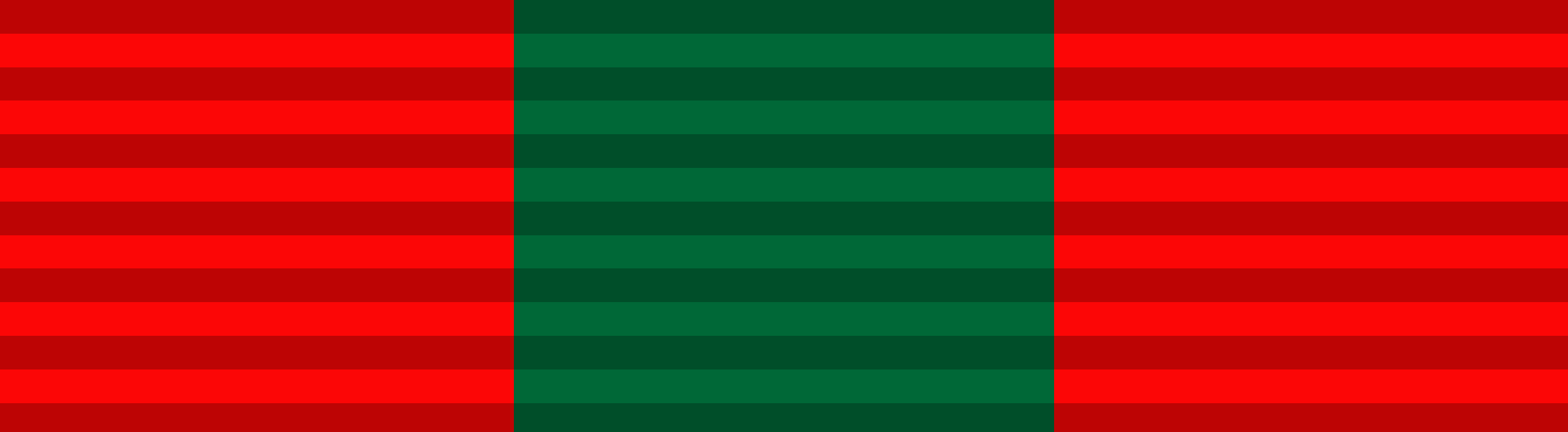

Hilal-e-Imtiaz (Military) (Crescent of Excellence) (2018)	Nishan-e-Imtiaz (Military) (Order of Excellence) (2022)	Hilal-e-Jurat (Crescent of Courage) (2025)

=== Other awards ===
Sword of Honour

=== Foreign decorations ===
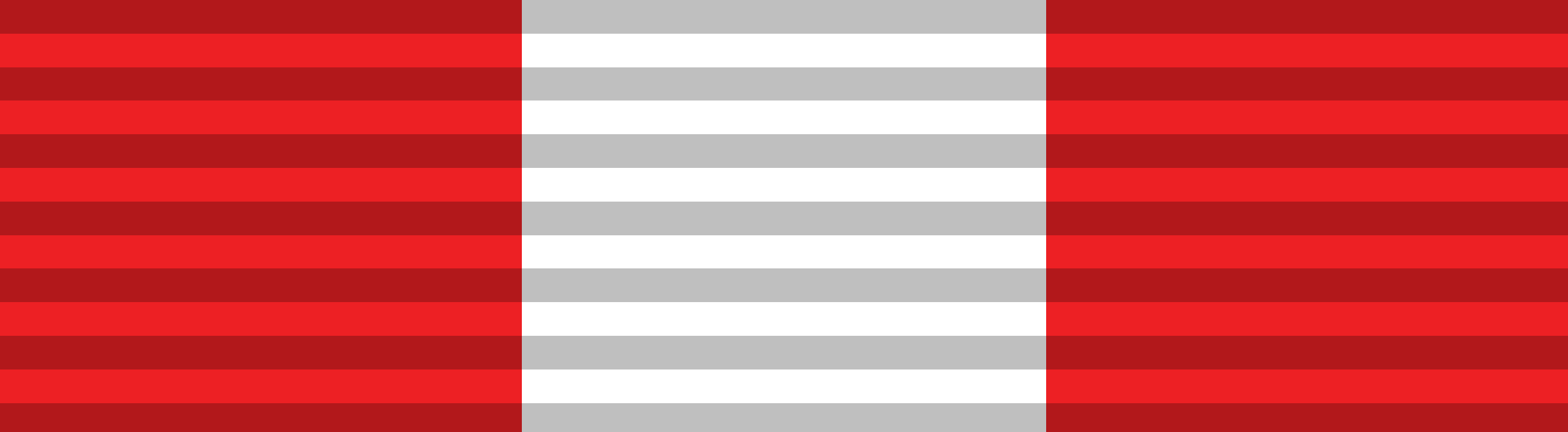

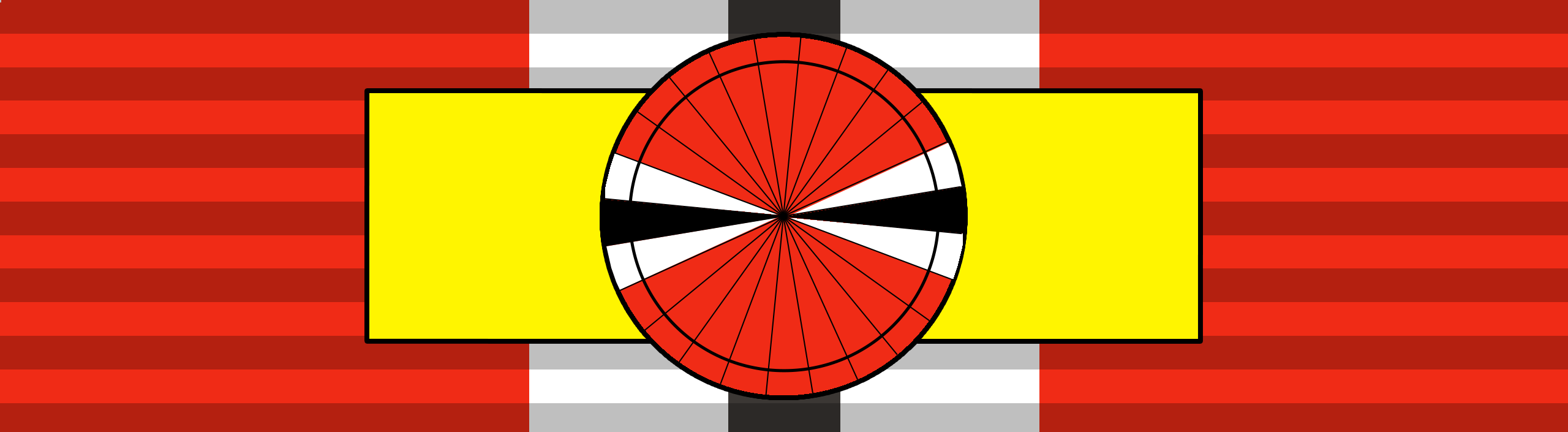

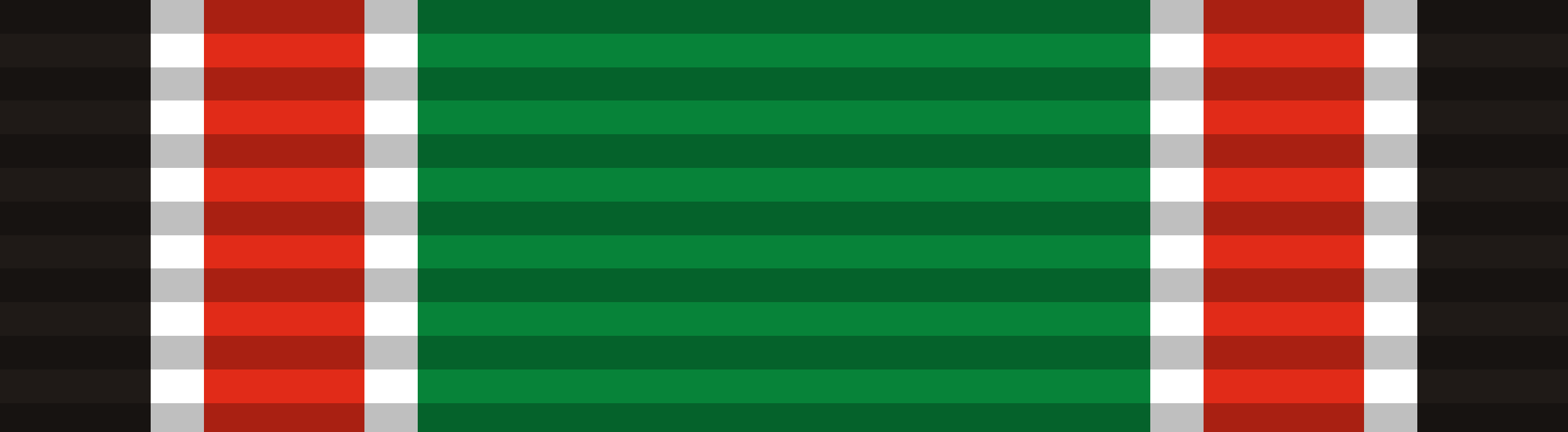

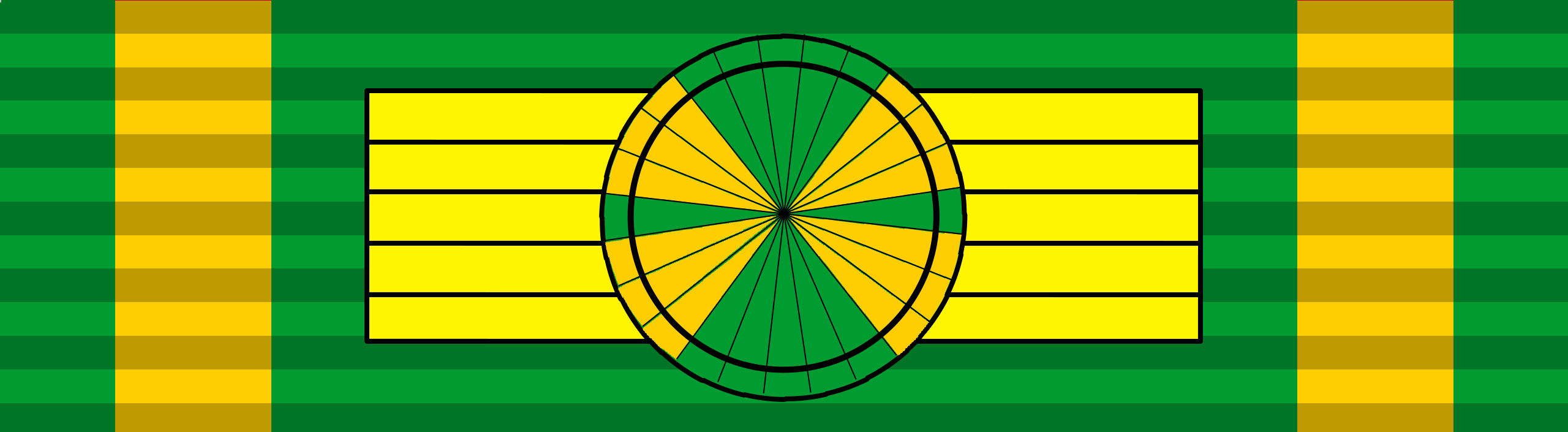

Turkish Armed Forces Medal of Merit Turkey (2023)	Order of Bahrain, First Class Bahrain (2024)	Order of the Military Merit, First Degree Jordan (2025)
Hero of the Patriotic War Medal Azerbaijan (2025)	King Abdulaziz Medal, Excellent Class Saudi Arabia (2025)	Turkish Armed Forces Medal of Distinguished Service Turkey (2026)

== Notes ==
Military offices
Preceded by Qamar Javed Bajwa	Chief of Army Staff	Succeeded by –

Military offices
Preceded by Naveed Mukhtar	Director General Inter-Services Intelligence	Succeeded by Faiz Hameed
