= Martial Law Administrator of Balochistan =

- Flag of the Pakistan Army
- Style: Lieutenant General
- Term length: Undefined
- Inaugural holder: Rahimuddin Khan
- Formation: July 1977

The Martial Law Administrator of Balochistan was the head of the military regime of Balochistan, the largest province of Pakistan. The capacity was first established when martial law was imposed by General Yahya Khan, who appointed Riaz Hussain to the post, but was never officially ratified. It therefore lapsed when Yahya resigned. The post was officially in operation from July 1977, when martial law was imposed again, until late 1985, when it was informally terminated upon the lifting of martial law by Prime Minister Muhammad Khan Junejo. The martial law administrator was a serving Lieutenant General of the Pakistan Army, appointed by the Chief of Army Staff. General Muhammad Zia-ul-Haq was the incumbent in each instance. When the presidential term of Fazal Ilahi Chaudhry ended, the post assumed the political office of Governor of Balochistan; the civilian Chief Justices who were acting as governors of the provinces were replaced by their martial law counterparts. Of the three officeholders, none completed their designated term.

== List of Martial Law Administrators of Balochistan ==
Name of Lieutenant General	Entered Office	Left Office
Rahimuddin Khan	July 1977	March 1984
F.S. Khan Lodhi	March 1984	July 1984
Khushdil Khan Afridi (initially acting)	July 1984	December 1985
