= XII Corps (Pakistan) =

Pakistan Army's field maneuver strike corps

- Badge of XII Corps
- Active: 1984; 42 years ago
- Country: Pakistan
- Branch: Pakistan Army
- Type: XXX Corps
- Role: Maneuver/Deployment oversight.
- Size: ~45,000 approximately (Though this may vary as units are rotated)
- HQ/Garrison: Quetta Cantonment, Balochistan, Pakistan
- Nicknames: Quetta Corps; Southern Command
- Colors Identification: Red, white and black
- Anniversaries: 1985
- Engagements: Insurgency in Balochistan: 1970s operation in Balochistan; India–Pakistan wars and conflicts: 2001–2002 India–Pakistan standoff; 2024 Iran–Pakistan border skirmishes: Operation Marg Bar Sarmachar; Afghanistan–Pakistan border skirmishes: 2017 Afghanistan-Pakistan border Skirmishes; 2026 Afghanistan–Pakistan war; Afghanistan conflict: Soviet war in Afghanistan; War in Afghanistan; War on terror: NATO logistics during the War in Afghanistan (2001–2021)
- Decorations: Military Decorations of Pakistan Military

Commanders
- Commander: Lt-Gen. Rahat Naseem Ahmed Khan
- Notable commanders: General K.S. Wynne; General Abdul Waheed; Lt-Gen. Sarfraz Ali; Lt-Gen.Asif Ghafoor

Insignia
- Flag

The XII Corps is a field corps of the Pakistan Army currently headquartered in Quetta, Balochistan in Pakistan.

With reserves, paramilitary, and other military formations supporting the XII Corps, the corps has an area of responsibility of Balochistan and oversees its mission of responsibility to protect as an army's regional formation in Pakistan's security apparatus known as the Southern Command.

== History ==
=== Formations and war service ===
The Afghan and Iranian immigration to Pakistan and the Afghan Army's military raids in Chaman prompted the Army GHQ to form and raise the military formations to guard its western borders in 1984. The XII Corps was raised with its HQ in Quetta Cantonment as Lt-Gen. K.K. Afridi becoming its first commander in 1985. Its military engagement has been limited to the Balochistan conflict, which it mainly tackles through the Frontier Corps (paramilitary) and local police department.

Syed Zakir Ali Zaidi served as the corps commander in 1987-89. After handing over the corps to his successor he became president of the National Defence University, from 1 August 1989 to18 June 1990.

Similar to the V Corps in Sindh, the XII Corps has an area of expertise in desert warfare, and oversees security operations together with the local law enforcement, mechanized divisions guarding the nation's desert and dune ranges, and paramilitary to ensure the national defenses of the Pakistan.

Together with the air force units, naval bases, marines camps, paramilitaries, army reserves, and air forces ranges, the XII Corps forms and leads the major regional formation in Pakistan's security spectrum known as the Southern Command.

== Structure ==
The XII Corps has not seen military action against the Indian Army (east) nor the Afghan National Army (west) but tackled counterinsurgency time to time which led to the troop rotations based on the strategic calculations. The XII Corps has receives reinforcement in its missions on war on terror and is based on the known information publicly available:

Structure of XII Corps
Corps	Corps HQ	Corps Commander	Assigned Units	Unit HQ
XII Corps	Quetta	Rahat Naseem Ahmed Khan	33rd Infantry Division	Khuzdar
XII Corps	Quetta	Rahat Naseem Ahmed Khan	41st Infantry Division	Quetta
XII Corps	Quetta	Rahat Naseem Ahmed Khan	44th Light Infantry Division	Gwadar
XII Corps	Quetta	Rahat Naseem Ahmed Khan	Independent Infantry Brigade	Turbat
XII Corps	Quetta	Rahat Naseem Ahmed Khan	Independent Armoured Brigade	Khuzdar
XII Corps	Quetta	Rahat Naseem Ahmed Khan	Independent Infantry Brigade	Gwadar
XII Corps	Quetta	Rahat Naseem Ahmed Khan	Independent Engineer Brigade	U/I Location
XII Corps	Quetta	Rahat Naseem Ahmed Khan	Independent Signal Brigade	U/I Location

== List of Commanders XII Corps ==
Lieutenant-General	Rahat Naseem Ahmed Khan	November 2023	
Lieutenant-General	Asif Ghafoor	August 2022	November 2023
Lieutenant-General	Sarfraz Ali	December 2020	August 2022
Lieutenant-General	Muhammad Waseem Ashraf	September 2019	December 2020
Lieutenant-General	Asim Saleem Bajwa	September 2017	September 2019
Lieutenant-General	Aamer Riaz	October 2015	September 2017
Lieutenant-General	Nasser Khan Janjua	September 2013	October 2015
Lieutenant-General	Alam Khattak	October 2011	September 2013
Lieutenant-General	Javed Zia	April 2010	October 2011
Lieutenant-General	Khalid Shameem Wynne	April 2007	April 2010
Lieutenant-General	Shahid Hamid	September 2003	October 2004
Lieutenant-General	Abdul Qadir Baloch	October 2001	September 2003
Lieutenant-General	Mushtaq Hussain	October 1999	October 2001
Lieutenant-General	Tariq Pervaiz	May 1997	October 1999
Lieutenant-General	Saranjam Khan	1995	May 1997
Lieutenant-General	Zia Ullah Khan	January 1993	1995
Lieutenant-General	Abdul Waheed Kakar	August 1989	January 1993
Lieutenant-General	Syed Zakir Ali Zaidi	May 1987	August 1989
Lieutenant-General	Khushdil Khan Afridi	1985	May 1987

== See also ==
- 2022 Pakistan Army helicopter incident
