= Alam Khattak =

Pakistani general

Alam Khattak محمّدخٹک

Defence Secretary of Pakistan
- In office August 2014 – August 2016

Commander Southern Command & XII Corps
- In office October 2011 – September 2013

Chief of Logistic Staff
- In office September 2009 – October 2011

Personal details
- Born: Muhammad Alam Khattak Nowshera, Khyber Pakhtunkhwa.
- Parent: Muhammad Akram Khattak (father)
- Awards: Hilal-i-Imtiaz (Military); Tamgha-e-Basalat
- Nickname: Khattak

Military service
- Allegiance: Pakistan
- Branch/service: Pakistan Army
- Years of service: 1975 – 2013
- Rank: Lieutenant General
- Unit: Frontier Force Regiment (14th FF)
- Commands: 41st Infantry Division, Quetta; IG Frontier Corps (NWFP); Deputy Chief of General Staff (DCGS); Chief of Logistics Staff (CLS); Southern Command, Quetta
- Battles/wars: Indo-Pakistani War of 1999; Balochistan conflict War in North-West Pakistan

Muhammad Alam Khan Khattak, HI(M), TBt, was a Pakistan Army general who was the Commander of Southern Command based at Quetta and later served as the country's Federal Defence Secretary. He took over the command in October 2011 after staying as Chief of Logistics Staff (CLS) at the Army GHQ for two years.

He was previously in charge of the Frontier Corps as its Inspector-General and led it most notably in the War in North-West Pakistan from 2006 to 2008. Before that, he led the Quetta Infantry Division in the ongoing insurgency in Balochistan from 2004 to 2006.

== Early life ==
Alam Khattak was born in Nowshera village of Dak Ismail Khel and is an ethnic Pashtun from the Khattak tribe. He was commissioned in the Pakistan Army's famed 14th Frontier Force Regiment in April 1975 in the 51st PMA Long Course.

== Insurgency in Balochistan ==
Khattak first came to prominence in 2004-2006, when as commander of Pakistan's 41st Infantry Division in Quetta he was thrust into battle against Balochi tribal militants. Despite a few early setbacks he was able to more or less control/contain the militancy, through a combination of diplomacy (he helped to create a tribal militia to counter the militants called the "Marri Force") and decisive action when merited.

== War in North-West Pakistan ==
This brought him to the fore and he was sent to another hotspot as commander of the paramilitary Frontier Corps in 2006. Here he applied the lessons learned and unlike his predecessor insisted on dialogue which ultimately led to the 2006 peace deal. Unfortunately this was used by foreign militants to regroup and led to a spate of suicide bombings in Pakistan in 2007. The end of the ceasefire and the militants offensive brought FC under tremendous pressure and Khattak was criticized. However, he had by late 2007 and 2008 in conjunction with regular army troops managed to bring most of the restive Swat and Waziristan areas under some aspect of authority as evidenced by Baitullah Mehsud's unilateral ceasefire.

== Senior staff appointments ==
He was replaced by Maj Gen Tariq Khan as the Inspector General in September 2008. Khattak then took over as the Deputy Chief of General Staff replacing Lt Gen Javed Zia who proceeded as the Adjutant General at the Army GHQ.

On September 25, 2009, he was promoted to the rank of Lieutenant General and took over the post of Chief of Logistics Staff (CLS) from the retiring Lt Gen Shafaat Ullah Shah.

On October 4, 2011 he took over the Southern Command from the retiring Lt Gen Javed Zia and thus being back at the forefront of War in North-West Pakistan after commanding troops at the division level.

He retired from the Army in 2013 and was appointed Secretary Defense on 4 August 2014.
