= Malacca Cane (Pakistan) =

Pakistan military commander baton

Malacca Cane is a commander baton of Pakistan Army. Apart from the Chief of Army Staff, corps commanders, general officers commanding (GOCs), and brigade commanders also carry command batons. It is used as an accoutrement for army commanders during ceremonial events such as saluting the national flag, accepting a guard of honour, or conducting a parade inspection. Traditionally, the Chief of Army Staff (COAS) does not display the baton during a formal meeting with the president or the prime minister. It stands as a profound symbol, arguably representing the pinnacle of power within Pakistan Army.

It derives its name from the port city of Malacca in modern-day Malaysia. The Malacca cane in Pakistan is manufactured from the elongated, thin stems of rattan palms indigenous to the northern regions.
