= Khushdil Khan Afridi =

Pakistan Army general

- Died: September 2025
- Military career
- Allegiance: Pakistan
- Branch: Pakistan Army
- Rank: Lieutenant General
- Commands: XII Corps

Khushdil Khan Afridi (died September 2025) was a Pakistani Army general and regional administrator who served as the Governor of Balochistan, Pakistan from 18 November 1984 to 30 December 1985, during General Zia ul Haq's martial law administration.

After retiring from gubernatorial service, he became the first commander of the XII Corps, which he led until May 1987. He also commanded the 18th Frontier Force Regiment

Afridi died in September 2025.

Preceded by F.S. Khan Lodhi	Governor of Balochistan; 1984–1985	Succeeded by Muhammad Musa
