= Mian Hayaud Din =

Pakistan Army general (1910–1965)

Major General Mian Hayaud Din HJ MBE MC LoH LoM
- Born: 2 July 1910; Peshawar, British India (now Pakistan)
- Died: 20 May 1965 (aged 54); Cairo, United Arab Republic (now Egypt)
- Military career
- Allegiance: (British Raj) British India (1932–1947); Pakistan (1947–1960)
- Branch: (British Raj) British Indian Army; Pakistan Army
- Service years: 1932–1960
- Rank: Major-General
- Nickname: Gunga
- Service number: A.I. 97; PA-18
- Unit: Frontier Force Regiment
- Commands: 9/12 Battalion Frontier Force Regiment; Bannu Brigade; GOC VII Division; Colonel Commandant-Frontier Force Regiment; Chief of General Staff (CGS)
- Conflicts: Second World War: Anglo-Iraqi War; Burma Campaign 1944-1945; First Indochina War Indo-Pakistani War of 1947
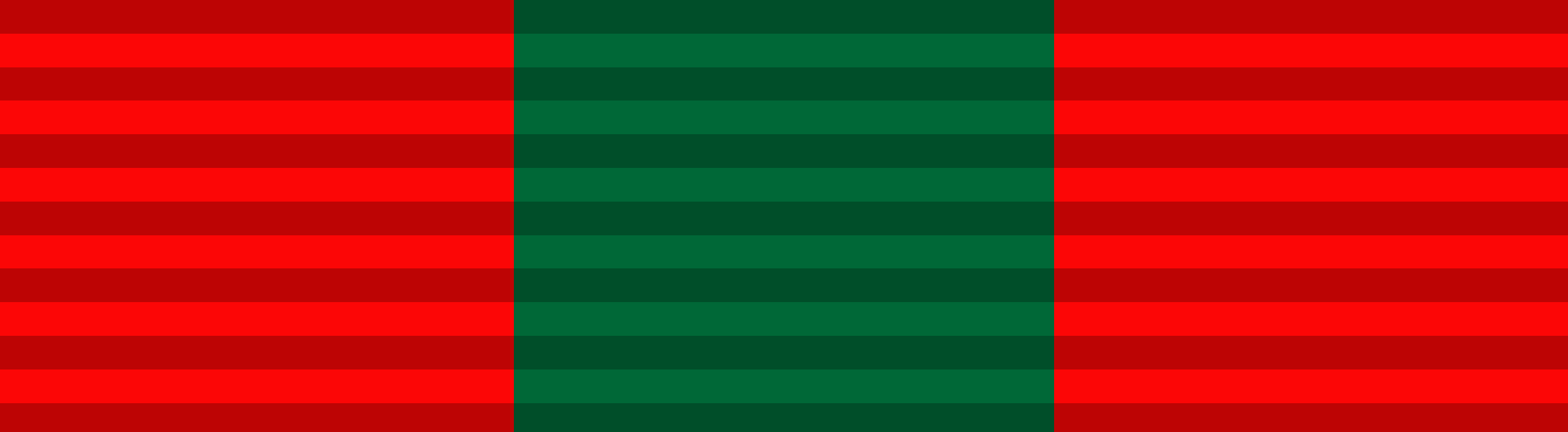
- Awards: Hilal-i-Jurat Order of the British Empire Military Cross Legion d'Honneur Legion of Merit
- Other work: Director General, Bureau of Mineral Resources; managing director, Oil & Gas Development Corporation; Chairman, National Press Trust

Mian Hayaud Din (2 July 1910 – 20 May 1965) was a Pakistani military officer who served in the British Indian Army during the Second World War and later became Chief of General Staff.

== Early life and education ==
Mian Hayaud Din was born in Peshawar, the capital of the North-West Frontier Province. Mian Hayaud Din studied at the Edwardes Mission School and then Islamia College, Peshawar, before being selected in an All-India competition to be a cadet at the Royal Military College, Sandhurst.

== Career in the British Indian Army ==
He was commissioned a King's Commissioned Indian Officer from Sandhurst on the Unattached List, Indian Army as of 28 January 1932, he was posted for his one-year regimental attachment to the 2nd battalion Royal Scots Regiment. He was the first non-British Officer to be so attached. This service commenced in Quetta, Baluchistan, where he met Ahmad Yar Khan, the Khan of Kalat, who was also attached to the same Regiment and they became close friends.

In March 1933, he joined the fourth battalion, 12th Frontier Force Regiment of the British Indian Army. He was particularly effective in command of Sikh troops, as he was one of the few Muslim Officers in the British Indian Army certified as fluent in speaking, reading and writing Gurmukhi, the Panjabi language of the Sikhs. From his childhood in Peshawar, he was fluent in Pashto (his mother tongue) Persian; Hindko (the dialect of Panjabi spoken by the non-Pashtun residents of the City of Peshawar) and Urdu (the language of Indian Muslims), in addition to having taken French while at Sandhurst.

He served on the North West Frontier in the 1930s and was posted to the 11th battalion, 12th Frontier Force Regiment (the Indian Territorial Force battalion) on 20 September 1938 at Nowshera near Peshawar. He was Local Captain from 16 November 1938 until 8 March 1939, then received substantive promotion to Captain on 27 August 1939.

On 4 September 1939, he was appointed Adjutant. The battalion was embodied 4 September 1939 as part of the Nowshera Brigade, which was completed by 20 September, at Nowshera. It moved at the end of September 1939 to Dacca in East Bengal to relieve the 2nd battalion, 14th Punjab Regiment.

There he extensively trekked through the jungles of the Chittagong Hill Tracts.

The battalion trained at Dacca as part of the Eastern Bengal Brigade Area and performed internal security duties for one year. It moved to Quetta on 16 November 1940. It performed internal security duties at Quetta under the command of Baluchistan District. It was converted to an active battalion as the 14th (Suba Sarhad) Battalion, 12th Frontier Force Regiment at Quetta on 15 September 1941.

He was made a Member in Military Division of The Most Excellent Order of the British Empire (MBE) for service as adjutant with 11/12th FFR in the London Gazette 1 July 1941.

Attended the Staff College, Quetta (fourth war course) 21 July – 4 December 1941. His classmates included, among others, Major Muhammad Ayub Khan, later to become President of Pakistan.

With Hitler's attack on Stalingrad it was thought a possible breakthrough to the Middle-Eastern oilfields may occur, so Indian Army units were transferred to Iraq. For his meritorious services on the staff as a General Staff Officer 2nd grade in Iraq and Persia with the Persia And Iraq Force he was mentioned in dispatches in the London Gazette on 5 August 1943.

== Burma Campaign and after ==
Posted to Burma in September 1944, he was appointed second in command of the 9th battalion, 12th Frontier Force Rifles, also known as "Naubara" and currently 14th Frontier Force Regiment. The battalion was part of 80th Indian Infantry Brigade commanded by Brigadier Stuart Greeves. The brigade was part of Major General Douglas David Gracey's 20th Indian Division. After two previous battalion commanders were wounded, in February 1945 he was promoted to battalion commander and later decorated with the Military Cross for gallantry. In addition, he was mentioned in dispatches again in the London Gazette twice more: 27 September 1945 and 9 May 1946.

Lt Col Hayaud Din then served with 80th Brigade still commanding 9th battalion 12th Frontier Force Regiment as part of Allied Land Forces French Indochina (ALFFIC) in South East Asia under the overall command of Major-General Douglas David Gracey Commander of Allied Land Forces, French Indo-China (later Vietnam), in 1945–1946. He was selected by General Gracey to receive the sword of surrender from the Commander in Chief of Japanese forces in that theatre of operations. For his distinguished conduct and gallantry in assisting French forces, Mian Hayaud Din was later awarded the Cross of Commandeur of the Légion d'Honneur, by the French Government.

Promoted to temporary Colonel he was selected to attend the first post-war course at the Joint Services Staff College, Latimer, England. He was the senior Indian Army officer on the course.

In early 1946, he served as the President of the Indian Army Selection Board in Pune. He was then selected as the Deputy Commander of the Indian Army Mission to the Allied Peace Commission in Berlin from late 1946 to late 1947. He was returning from Berlin in August 1947 as the British withdrew and gave independence to Pakistan.

== Career in the Pakistan Army ==
Colonel Mian Hayaud Din opted for Pakistan, and was 18th on the officer seniority list of the newly formed Pakistan Army.

Major General Roger Eustace Le Fleming, a British officer, commanded the Waziristan District, from 1944 till June 1948 and was responsible for the long planned withdrawal of regular troops, both Indian and Pakistani, after Independence on 14 August 1947. A file of his papers on the operation n are available at the National Army Museum, London

Promoted to command the Bannu Brigade in December 1947, he oversaw Operation Curzon, the name given to the withdrawal of troops from the Tribal Areas in Waziristan, bordering South Eastern Afghanistan. He met with tribal elders and informed them that while he and his soldiers were fellow Muslims and largely Pashtuns, as were the tribesmen, any firing on the withdrawing troops would be countered with a crushing response, in keeping with tribal customs of revenge. The tribes offered no resistance and the entire withdrawal was completed peacefully. Three authors disagree as two units were ambushed: in September 1947 1/4th Gurkha Rifles left Wana and were ambushed in the Shahur Tangi defile, in South Waziristan – they had fifty casualties. The second unit was the 4/5th Punjabis who lost eight dead and twenty-seven wounded in an ambush.

He commanded the Bannu Brigade, renamed 102 Brigade, until January 1948.

During the 1947–1948 Kashmir war, Brigadier Hayaud Din fought in the Poonch sector. He led a small group of volunteers, with mobile artillery transported by mules, shelling the airfield at Poonch from the surrounding hills to the point of rendering it unusable. Indian Army garrison forces in the town were preparing to surrender to him when a general cease-fire in all of Kashmir came into effect. For his bravery and successful command of operations, he was recommended by General Sir Douglas Gracey for the equivalent of the British Distinguished Service Order, its 2nd highest gallantry award after the Victoria Cross. As a result, he was awarded the Hilal-i-Jurat, Pakistan's second highest gallantry award.

He was then posted to London in late 1948 as the first military advisor to the Pakistan High Commission in the United Kingdom.

In early 1950, on promotion to major general, he returned to general headquarters and was appointed as the first non-British officer to command 7th (Golden Arrow) Division as its General Officer Commanding at Rawalpindi. When the Rawalpindi Conspiracy 1951 was unfolding, he personally arrested Major General Akbar Khan DSO, then Chief of General Staff and ring-leader of the conspiracy.

In 1952, he attended the Imperial Defence College, London, and on the successful completion of this course, Major General Mian Hayaud Din was appointed the Chief of General Staff of the Pakistan Army.

His deep interest in history and archaeology was reflected in his unique collection of historical books and manuscripts. His military writings are still part of the curriculum taught at the Pakistan Military Academy. He was the author of One Hundred Glorious Years, a book he wrote for the Centenary Celebrations of the Frontier Force Regiment.

He also wrote articles on the historic forts at Attock and Rohtas, the latter is currently referred to on the Wikipedia website for Rohtas Fort, Pakistan.

In 1954, the Cambridge University Mountaineering Club's Karakoram expedition arrived in Pakistan to scale the unclimbed peak, Rakaposhi. Major General Hayaud Din joined the expedition as liaison officer. Members of this strong expedition included the Austrians Anderl Heckmair and Matthias Rebitsch, the Englishman George Band and the Genevan Dr. Alfred Tissières. The climbing party tried the south-west spur of Rakaposhi which connects with the south-west ridge at the Monk's Head. Base camp was set up at the Kunti glacier. The expedition went up to 6,340m/20,800 ft but bad weather and shortage of time forced it to return to the base camp. A contemporary film of the expedition is in the public domain

In July 1955, Major General Mian Hayaud Din was posted to Washington DC as Chief of the Pakistan Military Mission. He was closely involved in all aspects of the USMAAG Program. His close personal friendships with General Nathan Twining, Chairman of the Joint Chiefs of Staff; General Thomas White, USAF Chief of Staff; General Earle Wheeler, US Army Chief of Staff, among others, and his excellent relationships with senior civilian members of the Eisenhower Administration's Department of Defence resulted in his being read into the Congressional Record by Senator Strom Thurmond.

For example, in 1958 when the US was considering providing supersonic aircraft to augment the North American F-86 Sabrejet fighters previously provided to the Pakistan Air Force (PAF), it initially intended to provide 100 North American F-100 SuperSabre jets, which could be used in both ground attack and interception, capable of speeds up to Mach 1. He prevailed upon the US Government to supply a smaller number of the Lockheed F-104 Starfighter instead. While this aircraft was primarily intended for high-altitude bomber interception at speeds of Mach 2 and, therefore, more useful in serving Pakistan's military alliance with the West in a possible conflict with the USSR, it had the additional benefit of being a potent psychological deterrent in a more localised conflict scenario. The US provided 10 F104-A single seater versions of these and 2 F104-B twin-seat trainers.

The Commanding Officer of this new squadron was Squadron Leader Mian Sadruddin, who went on to become an Air Vice Marshal and PAF Deputy Chief of Staff. His wingman and 2nd in command was Flight Lt. Jamal Ahmad Khan, who went on to become an Air Chief Marshal and PAF Commander in Chief. Both these officers were outstanding in their flying and command skills, representing the unique combination achieved by the Pakistan military establishment from the 1950s onwards, combining British organizational and command culture with the intensive training and superb technology of the US.

Upon his departure from Washington in September 1960 as Dean of the Corps of Military Attaches, he was awarded the Legion of Merit by the Eisenhower Administration. This is the highest decoration that can be bestowed by the US Government upon a foreign military officer and has only been awarded to about 600 persons, including General George Patton; Audie Murphy; Chiang Kai-shek and Dean Rusk.

His gallantry/service decorations, plus three Mentions in Despatches, made him the most highly decorated officer of the Pakistan Army, and the only Officer ever to have been decorated by the Governments of Britain; France; Pakistan and the USA.

He ended active service in the Pakistan Army upon completing 28 years of service, in the rank of Major General, and retired in December 1960.

== Government service ==
Upon retirement from the Pakistan Army, he was appointed in a civilian capacity as Director General (Bureau of Mineral Resources) in the Ministry of Fuel, Power and Natural Resources. The Minister handling this portfolio was Zulfikar Ali Bhutto, a future Foreign Minister, President, Civilian Martial Law Administrator and Prime Minister of Pakistan.

In October 1961, he visited the Sui Gas Fields to visit an Indian Army colleague, with whom he had served in Burma during WW II, who was an executive there. His Indian Army colleague's wife, Sylvia Matheson, was an archaeologist, who inscribed and gave him a copy of her book Time Off To Dig. During her time in Sui she later met and befriended Nawab Akbar Khan Bugti, who featured prominently in her next book – Tigers of Baluchistan. She dedicated this book to General "Gunga" Hayaud Din, as he was known to his closest friends, including Sylvia Matheson and her husband.

In 1962, he was appointed founding managing director of the Oil & Gas Development Corporation of Pakistan (OGDC). Its purpose was to explore and develop oil and gas deposits. Under his leadership a very large gas deposit was found off the coast of East Pakistan, now Bangladesh. Ms. Viqar-un-Nisa Quadri's article "OGDC Memories" published in the Dawn Magazine issue of Sunday, 11 January 1998 attests to his leadership and startup of an organisation in which Russians and Pakistanis worked together successfully, under trying conditions.

== Death ==
On 1 May 1965 he relinquished charge of the OGDC, upon his appointment as Chairman of the National Press Trust (NPT), a position which also included the rank of Cabinet Minister in the Federal Government of Pakistan. He was leading a delegation of Pakistani journalists and tourism/travel executives to Cairo on Pakistan International Airlines' inaugural flight PK 705 when the aircraft crashed while landing at Cairo in the pre-dawn darkness on 20 May 1965. Of the 119 passengers and crew, only 6 survived.

The remains of nearly all the crash victims, including those of Major General Mian Hayaud Din, were buried in a special graveyard at Cairo.

== Citations for awards ==
=== Hilal–i–Jurat ===
Citation for Major General Mian Hayauddin MBE, MC

"In February 1948 to prevent the complete over-running of KASHMIR by INDIA and the consequent flooding of PAKISTAN by a further influx of refugees, it was decided to render some active support to the AZAD Forces fighting in KASHMIR.

A detachment mainly of artillery was accordingly dispatched in early March to POONCH under the command of a specially selected officer Brigadier (now Major General) Hayauddin.

At the time there was no road to POONCH beyond PANJAR, heavy rainfall had destroyed even the rough hill tracks, a lesser commander would have delayed and hesitated but Major General Hayauddin pushed on with the utmost determination and in spite of immense difficulties successfully coordinated an attack which took place on 17 March 1948.

The attack was well planned and the INDIANS evacuated their positions. The AZAD Forces were however too untrained to take full advantage of the situation, and the enemy were able to reoccupy their positions on the following day. Major General Hayauddin however never contemplated withdrawing his detachment and managed to keep the INDIAN airfield under fire for some days. INDIA was eventually forced to mount a complete expedition to relieve POONCH, which constituted for PAKISTAN a most useful diversion of INDIA's energies and resources.

The determination and skilful action of Major General Hayauddin's detachment constituted a most vital phase in the KASHMIR war.

I recommend him strongly for an award equal to the DSO."

F Loftus Tottenham

Major General (Retd)

Late GOC 7 Division.

- Major General Mian Hayauddin MBE, MC

"Major General (then Brigadier) M Hayauddin MBE MC, was sent by me to take command of operations in POONCH area in February 1948, at a time when there was grave danger that the considerable Indian force of a Brigade plus would drive away the Azad and tribal forces who were investing POONCH and who were gradually losing their morale and becoming shaken and disorganised.

As stated by Major General Loftus Tottenham (recommendation attached) Major General Hayauddin showed the greatest determination, courage and initiative – not only in reorganising the forces on the spot and building up their morale, but also in staging an attack on the Indian defences of POONCH, which would undoubtedly have succeeded if it had had a little more Regular backing.

I entirely endorse all that Major General Loftus Tottenham has written about his actions, and also his recommendation that Major General M Hayauddin is greatly deserving of a Pakistani decoration of the equivalent of a DSO for his great courage, skilful leadership and organisation, dogged determination and invaluable reports – all under conditions which would have dismayed and discouraged a less determined leader."

Gracey

General

Late C in C Pakistan Army, 1948 – 51.

8 March 1954.

=== Most Excellent Order of the British Empire ===
George the Sixth by the Grace of God of Great Britain, Ireland and the British Dominions beyond the Seas, King, Defender of the Faith, Emperor of India and Sovereign of the Most Excellent Order of the British Empire to Our trusty and well beloved Mian Hayaud Din Esquire, Captain acting Major, in Our Indian Army:

Greeting

Whereas, We have thought fit to nominate and appoint you to be an Additional Member of the Military Division of Our said Most Excellent Order of the British Empire, We do by these presents grant unto you the Dignity of an Additional Member of Our said Order, and hereby authorise you to have, hold and enjoy the said Dignity and Rank of an Additional Member of Our aforesaid Order, together with all and singular the privileges thereunto belonging or appertaining.

Given at Our Court at Saint James's under Our Sign Manual and the Seal of Our said Order this First day of July 1941 in the Fifth year of Our Reign.

By the Sovereign's Command

Grand Master

Grant of the dignity of an Additional Member of the Military Division of the Order of the British Empire to Captain (acting Major) Mian Hayaud Din, I.A.

=== Military Cross ===
Major (Temporary) Mian Hayaud Din MBE (A.I. 97)

12th Frontier Force Regiment – Indian Army

On 28 February 1945 Major HAYAUD DIN 9th/12th Frontier Force Regiment was commanding his battalion during the capture of YEZIN and INYA.

The operation was a very difficult one because the tanks which were supporting the attack could only cross at CHAUNG in front of the enemy position at one place. Previous close reconnaissance of this place had been impossible.

Early in the operation unexpected heavy resistance was met with from the Southern flank in an area in which the tanks were unable to operate. This resistance completely held up the advance.

Major HAYAUD DIN detailed the necessary party to mask this opposition and handled his battalion with great skill. The infantry storming the CHAUNG secured a crossing place for the tanks and quickly consolidated. Major HAYAUD DIN rapidly organised the remaining two companies of his battalion to continue the advance to INYA in an entirely new direction. INYA was captured against strong opposition and an immediate counterattack beaten off with heavy losses to the Japs.

It was now nearly dark but so carefully had the administrative arrangements been previously planned that the necessary consolidation stores were brought up in time, the wounded evacuated and the positions consolidated enabling all counterattacks during the night 28 February/1 March to be beaten off.

During the course of this very complicated operation in which one hundred and forty nine Japanese were killed and much booty including a 105 mm gun was captured.

Major HAYAUD DIN displayed the greatest coolness and courage. During periods of heavy shelling his calm and unperturbed demeanour was an outstanding example to all ranks and largely contributed to the success of the operation.

Citation dated: 3 March 1945; Published in the "No. 37091". The London Gazette (Supplement). 24 May 1945. p. 2651.

=== Cross of Commandeur de la Legion d'Honneur ===
Washington DC – 10 June 1959: At a ceremony today at the French Embassy, Major General Mian Hayauddin – Military and Naval Attaché to the Embassy of Pakistan in the United States, was decorated with the Cross of Commandeur de la Légion d'Honneur by Major General Jean Marie Bezy – Air Attaché to the Embassy of France.

The speech of the French Ambassador to the USA:

"Dear General Hayaud Din

It is truly an honour and a source of great pleasure for me to present you with the ‘Cross of Commandeur de la Légion d'Honneur’.

The French Military ceremonies as a rule do not involve long speeches, therefore in a few short words, I will indicate the reasons which merit this decoration.

For a long time, France has desired to express to you her gratitude for your brilliant conduct in 1945 – 1946 during the campaign which brought about the surrender of the Japanese forces and Communist elements armed by them in South Vietnam.

At the head of your battalion you established bridgeheads, thus permitting the landing of Allied Forces in the Saigon area; you brought under control difficult regions at the price of heavy casualties; you succeeded everywhere.

Your brilliant leadership became so well known that the Divisional Commander, General Gracey, chose you to receive the sabre of the Japanese Commander in Chief at the time of his surrender.

By this brave and vigorous action, which put a quick end to a murderous occupation, you spared the lives of numerous of our French Compatriots and of our Vietnamese friends, and, in this way, you gave them liberty sooner.

The Government of the French Republic is deeply grateful to you.

The presence here today of His Excellency Aziz Ahmed, Ambassador of Pakistan to the United States, emphasises the concurrence of your own Government to this homage rendered to an outstanding officer who has served so magnificently the cause of liberty, the Allied cause, and at the same time the French cause.

The presence of our American friends shows the high esteem they have of you; your position as Dean of Military Attaches has only increased the number of your friends.

Dear General, with my personal congratulations, it is my pleasure to decorate you."

Reply by Major General Mian Hayauddin HJ, MBE, MC

"I consider it a great honour to be awarded the Legion of Honor by the Republic of France. It is a great honour indeed not only for me but also for my country. My part in World War Two was very small. The credit goes to the men who fought under me, as they are the ones who deserve this decoration.

France and Pakistan have been friends for a long time. In World Wars One and Two, soldiers from Pakistan fought side by side with French soldiers in France and other battlefields. Many of them paid the supreme sacrifice and are buried in France. I pray to Almighty God that relations between France and Pakistan, along with our friend USA grow stronger every day.

I thank Their Excellencies, The Ambassadors of France and Pakistan, along with other friends who have taken the trouble to grace this occasion. I thank again, the Republic of France for this very great honour bestowed upon me."

=== Medal of the Legion of Merit, Degree of Officer ===
Karachi – 12 January 1961: At a ceremony this afternoon at the American Embassy Residence Major General Hayaud Din – Director General, Bureau of Mineral Resources and former Chief of Pakistan's Military Mission to the United States, received the Medal of the Legion of Merit, Degree of Officer, from the American Ambassador William M Rountree.

The text of the citation accompanying the medal, which was read by Lieutenant Colonel William D Ward, Assistant Army Attaché to the American Embassy said:

"The President of the United States of America, authorised by Act of Congress, 20 July 1942, has awarded the Legion of Merit, Degree of Officer, to Major General Mian Hayaud Din, Pakistan Army, for exceptionally meritorious conduct in the performance of outstanding services:

General Hayaud Din has distinguished himself by exceptionally meritorious conduct in the performance of outstanding service as Military Attaché to the Embassy of Pakistan in the United States from July 1955 to September 1960. Through his tireless and selfless devotion to duty, he has contributed significantly to the attainment of the Free World's objectives of peace and security. His friendly and sincere co-operation with United States military personnel has served to strengthen the spirit of friendship and mutual confidence, which characterises the relationship between the Armed Forces of Pakistan and the United States of America. His outstanding leadership, sound judgment and exceptional energy in the performance of his important duties reflect distinct credit upon himself and the military service of his country."

== See also ==
- Nowshera
- Nowshera district
- Kakakhel (tribe)

Military offices
Preceded by Major General Akbar Khan	Chief of General Staff	Succeeded by Major General Sher Ali Khan Pataudi
