= Chief of the Army Staff (Pakistan) =

Professional head of the Pakistan Army

- Chief of the Army Staff's Emblem

- Flag of the Chief of the Army Staff

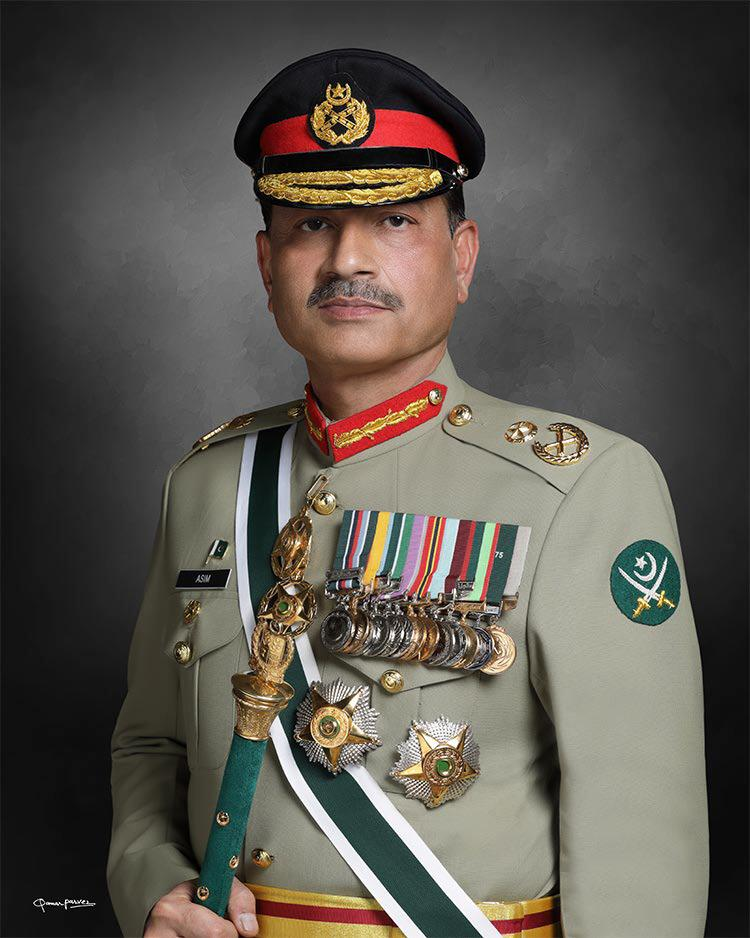
- Incumbent; Field Marshal; Asim Munir since 29 November 2022
- Pakistan Army
- Status: Professional head of land forces branch of the Pakistan Armed Forces
- Abbreviation: COAS
- Member of: Joint Chiefs of Staff Committee; National Security Council; Special Investment Facilitation Council
- Reports to: President of Pakistan; Prime Minister of Pakistan; Minister of Defence
- Residence: General Headquarters (Rawalpindi Cantonment)
- Seat: Rawalpindi, Punjab
- Nominator: Prime Minister of Pakistan
- Appointer: President of Pakistan
- Term length: 5 years; (renewable once)
- Constituting instrument: Constitution of Pakistan (Article 243)
- Precursor: Commander-in-Chief
- Formation: 3 March 1972; 54 years ago
- First holder: Tikka Khan
- Succession: Subjected to nomination by the Prime Minister
- Unofficial names: Army Chief
- Deputy: Chief of the General Staff (1947-present); Vice Chief of the Army Staff (1980-2007); Deputy Chief of the Army Staff (2001)
- Salary: According to Pakistan military officer's pay grade (apex scale)
- Website: Official website

The Chief of the Army Staff (COAS) is a statutory position in the Pakistan Army held by its professional head, which is usually a four-star general, appointed by the President on the Prime Minister's nomination. Since 2025, the COAS serves ex officio as the Chief of Defence Forces (CDF), the head of the Pakistan Armed Forces. As the highest-ranking officer, it is the most powerful position in the land army; and due to the influence of the military, the position is seen as the most powerful office in the country. (Note: Sources:)

Until 2025, the chief served as a member of the Joint Chiefs of Staff Committee, usually consulting the chiefs of the aerial and naval branches to act as a military adviser to the Prime Minister and the federal government in the line of defending the land borders of the country. The Chief of the Army Staff exercises responsibility of command and control of the operational, combatant, logistics, and training commands within the army.

The appointment, in principle, is constitutionally subjected to be for 5 years after the approval by the President on the recommendations of the Prime Minister. The COAS is based in the General Headquarters within the Rawalpindi Cantonment in Rawalpindi, Punjab. The incumbent COAS is Asim Munir, serving in this capacity since 29 November 2022.

== Office of the Chief of the Army Staff ==
The designation of the Chief of the Army Staff was created from the previous title Commander-in-Chief of the Pakistan Army in 1972. The Prime Minister approves the nomination and appointment of the Chief of Army Staff, with President confirming the Prime Minister's appointed choosing and nomination.

The army leadership is based in the GHQ whose functions are supervised by the Chief of Army Staff, assisted by the civilians from the Army Secretariat of the Ministry of Defence (MoD). The Chief of Army Staff exercises the responsibility of complete operational, training and logistics commands.

Typically, the Chief of Army Staff is a four-star full general. Asim Munir is the first army chief to have been promoted to the five-star field marshal rank.

There are several principal staff officers (PSO) who assist in running the operations of the Army GHQ:

- Chief of General Staff
- Chief of Logistics Staff
- Inspector-General of Training and Evaluation (IGT&E)
- Inspector-General Communications and IT (IGC&IT)
- Inspector-General Arms (IG Arms)
- Engineer-in-Chief (E-in-C)
- Military Secretary (Mil Secy)
- Adjutant-General
- Quartermaster General (QMG)

== List of Chiefs of the Army Staff ==
No.	Portrait	Chief of Army Staff	Took office	Left office	Time in office	Unit of Commission
01	Tikka KhanHQA HJ SPk	General; Tikka Khan; HQA HJ SPk (1915–2002)	3 March 1972	1 March 1976	3 years, 364 days	2 Fd Regt Arty
02	Zia-ul-HaqGSM OHA ORM OSJ OIn OYS	General; Zia-ul-Haq; GSM OHA ORM OSJ OIn OYS (1924–1988)	1 March 1976	17 August 1988	12 years, 169 days	13 Lancers
03	Mirza Aslam BegNI(M) SBt	General; Mirza Aslam Beg; NI(M) SBt (born 1931)	17 August 1988	16 August 1991	2 years, 364 days	16 Baloch
04	Asif Nawaz JanjuaNI(M) SBt	General; Asif Nawaz Janjua; NI(M) SBt (1937–1993)	16 August 1991	8 January 1993 †	1 year, 145 days	5 Punjab
05	Abdul Waheed KakarNI(M) SBt	General; Abdul Waheed Kakar; NI(M) SBt (1937–2026)	11 January 1993	12 January 1996	3 years, 1 day	5 FF / 27 AK
06	Jehangir KaramatNI(M) TBt	General; Jehangir Karamat; NI(M) TBt (born 1941)	12 January 1996	6 October 1998	2 years, 267 days	13 Lancers
07	Pervez MusharrafNI(M) TBt	General; Pervez Musharraf; NI(M) TBt (1943–2023)	6 October 1998	29 November 2007	9 years, 53 days	16 (SP) (The Dashing Sixteen)
08	Ashfaq Pervez KayaniNI(M) HI(C)	General; Ashfaq Pervez Kayani; NI(M) HI(C) (born 1952)	29 November 2007	29 November 2013	6 years	5 Baloch
09	Raheel SharifNI(M) HI(M)	General; Raheel Sharif; NI(M) HI(M) (born 1956)	29 November 2013	29 November 2016	3 years	6 FF
10	Qamar Javed BajwaNI(M) HI(M)	General; Qamar Javed Bajwa; NI(M) HI(M) (born 1960)	29 November 2016	29 November 2022	6 years	16 Baloch
11	Asim MunirNI(M) HJ HI(M)	Field Marshal; Asim Munir; NI(M) HJ HI(M) (born 1968)	29 November 2022	Incumbent	3 years, 333 days	23 FF

== See also ==
- Malacca Cane
- Chairman Joint Chiefs of Staff Committee
- List of serving generals of the Pakistan Army
- Chief of the Air Staff (Pakistan)
- Chief of the Naval Staff (Pakistan)
- Chief of the General Staff (Pakistan)
- Military dictatorship in Pakistan
