= General (Pakistan) =

Highest rank in Pakistan Army

- Insignia with crossed swords and laurel device of a four-star general

- Illustration of a general with corresponding stars
- Country: Pakistan
- Service branch: Pakistan Army
- Abbreviation: Gen.
- Rank: Four-star
- Next higher rank: Field marshal
- Next lower rank: Lieutenant General
- Equivalent ranks: Admiral (Pakistan Navy); Air chief marshal (Pakistan Air Force)

General /pɑːkistɑːni dʒɛnərəl/; Urdu: جنرل; abbreviated as GEN) is a four-star general officer rank of the Pakistan Army, officially used by the government of Pakistan to denote a supreme leader of the army. It is given to an army general officer (usually a lieutenant general) upon promotion or possibly a position advancement with a basic pay scale of 22 (BPS-22). It is the highest rank in the armed services, immediately ranks above three-star lieutenant general and below five-star field marshal. Since it is denoted by a four-star rank, it is equivalent to the rank of admiral and air chief marshal. The Pakistan army is led by a senior four-star general as Chief of Army Staff (COAS). The army chief also serves as a senior member of the Joint Chiefs of Staff Committee (JCSC). A new Chief of Army Staff is not always the most senior of the eligible generals; indeed, as of 2016, the new COAS has been the most senior candidate only four of fourteen times. Army general is a powerful rank in the country designed to command security affairs with military leadership privileges.

The insignia of a four-star general consists of shoulder stars, crossed swords and laurel device. The country's army is headed by two four-star officers, the COAS and the Chairman of the JCSC, with distinct positions, powers and responsibilities. The COAS has the power to command the armed forces, to ask for the written opinion of the military, and to promote or dismiss other officers as commissioned by the army law.

== Serving Generals ==
Currently serving 4-star generals in Pakistan army are mentioned below:

Number	Command flag	Rank	Name	Position	Decorations	Unit
01		General	Syed Aamer Raza	Commander, National Strategic Command	Hilal-e-Imtiaz (Military) Sitara-e-Basalat Nishan-i-Imtiaz (Military)	22 OTS 6th Lancers (Watson's Horse)

== Appointment ==
Four-star rank goes hand-in-hand with the positions of JCSC member and COAS, so this rank is not permanent. A general is directly nominated for appointment to four-star rank by the President of Pakistan in a joint effort with the prime minister who plays a key role in promoting, appointing or reappointment of a general. The term of service (or extension of an existing term of service) is usually decided as commissioned by the constitution. In case the reappointment or service extension is found ineligible or otherwise unauthorized, the Supreme Court may overrule the government order.

== See also ==
- List of serving generals of the Pakistan Army
