= Field marshal (Pakistan) =

Highest military rank of the Pakistan Army

Field marshal فیلڈ مارشل
- The insignia of a field marshal as worn on epaulettes
- Country: Pakistan
- Service branch: Pakistan Army
- Abbreviation: FM
- Next lower rank: General
- Equivalent ranks: Admiral of the fleet; Marshal of the air force

Field marshal (FM) (Note: Urdu: فیلڈ مارشل) is the highest rank in the Pakistan Army awarded by the government of Pakistan to officers of the Pakistan Army in recognition of distinguished service. Although it is a current and authorized rank with a pay grade of "Apex Scale," it has been conferred only thrice in history—on Ayub Khan in 1959, (Note: Ayub retired from active service in 1958; however, he was made field marshal in 1959. See "Special report: The Changing of the Guard 1958–1969", Dawn, 2 September 2017: Dawn October 27, 1959 (News Report) President Ayub made Field Marshal General Mohammad Ayub Khan was conferred the rank of Field Marshal by the presidential cabinet. The communique said that the conferment of this rank will serve to demonstrate to the world in a humble way the high esteem in which he is held by his people and how grateful the nation is to its saviour. The rank of Field Marshal is the highest rank of armies built on the patron of the British Army. The press communique added that by a peaceful revolution last year the President had not only defended the territorial integrity of Pakistan but had also saved the very existence of the nation.) King Mahendra of Nepal on 12 May 1963 (as an honorary conferment), and Asim Munir in 2025. It is an honorary rank and comes with no additional powers and pay grade. It is equivalent to admiral of the fleet in the Pakistan Navy and marshal of the air force in the Pakistan Air Force, and while it is an ordinarily senior rank in the Pakistan Army, it can be referred to as a five-star general "standard rank scale" to distinguish it from other military insignias.

== History ==
Since gaining independence in 1947, Pakistan has awarded the rank of Field Marshal only three times — first to Ayub Khan in October 1959.

The second instance was the honorary conferment of the rank upon King Mahendra of Nepal by Field Marshal and President Mohammad Ayub Khan, on 12 May 1963.

The third instance occurred in May 2025, when Asim Munir, the Chief of the Army Staff, was promoted to the rank of Field Marshal for his contributions in the 2025 India–Pakistan conflict when Pakistan, under Munir's leadership, retaliated against India, shooting down multiple Indian jets.

== Appointment ==
The appointment of field marshal is made through an appeal submitted for review request by the Prime Minister of Pakistan in a joint effort with the President and Defence Ministry to the Supreme Court or high court for constitutional orders under certain rules and regulations, although the president exercises the power of the commander-in-chief and prime minister leads the National Assembly.

== List of appointees ==
| No. | Portrait | Name (born–died) | Date of appointment | Notes | Ref. |
|---|---|---|---|---|---|
| 1 | | Muhammad Ayub Khan (1907–1974) | October 1959 | President of Pakistan (1958–1969) | |
| 2 | | Mahendra Bir Bikram Shah (1920–1972) | 12 May 1963 | King of Nepal (1955–1972) | |
| 3 | | Asim Munir (1968-present) | 20 May 2025 | Chief of Defence Forces (2025-present); Chief of Army Staff (2022-present) | |
