= Talbiyah =

Islamic Hajj prayer

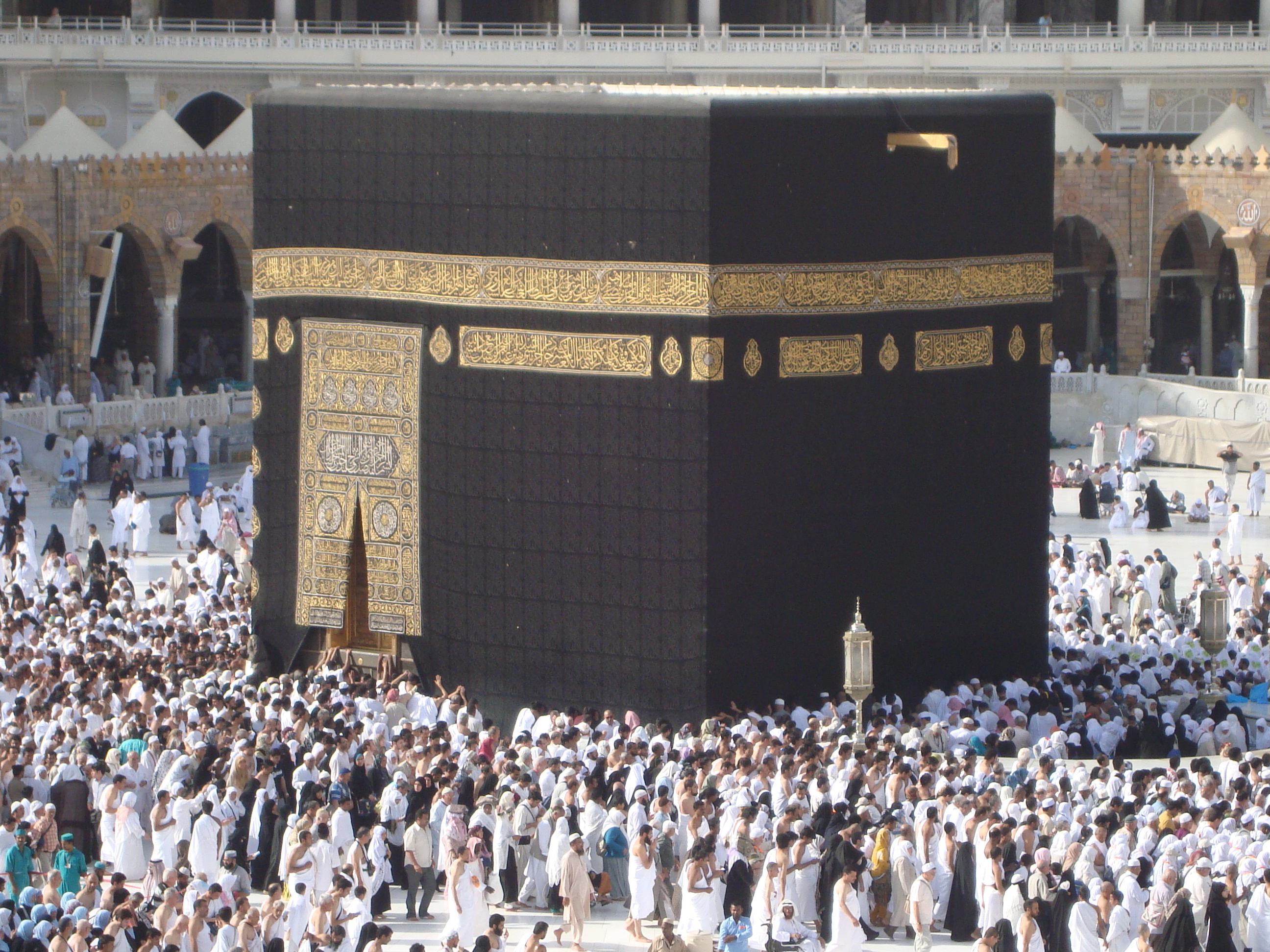
Muslim pilgrims surrounding the Kaaba during Tawaf in Mecca

The Talbiyah (Arabic: ٱلتَّلبِيَة, at-Talbiyah) is a Muslim prayer invoked by the pilgrims as a conviction that they intend to perform the Hajj only for the glory of Allah. Talbiyah is repeatedly invoked during the Hajj, or pilgrimage to Mecca, upon putting on the Ihram, so the pilgrims can purify and rid themselves of worldly concerns.

The text of the Talbiyah is:

لَبَّيْكَ ٱللَّٰهُمَّ لَبَّيْكَ، لَبَّيْكَ لَا شَرِيكَ لَكَ لَبَّيْكَ، إِنَّ ٱلْحَمْدَ وَٱلنِّعْمَةَ لَكَ وَٱلْمُلْكَ لَا شَرِيكَ لَكَ

Transliteration: labbayka -llāhumma labbayka, labbayka lā šarīka laka labbayka, ʾinna -l-ḥamda wa-n-niʿmata laka wa-l-mulka lā šarīka lak^{a}

IPA: [lab.baj.ka‿ɫ.ɫaː.hum.ma lab.baj.ka, lab.baj.ka laː ʃa.riː.ka la.ka lab.baj.ka, ʔin.na‿l.ħam.da wan.niʕ.ma.ta la.ka wal.mul.ka laː ʃa.riː.ka la.ka]

“Here I am [at your service] O God, here I am. Here I am [at your service]. You have no partners (other gods), here I am. To You alone is all praise and all excellence, and to You is all sovereignty. There is no partner to You.”

The Shia version of the talbiyah is exactly the same as the Sunni one but ends with an extra "Labbayk."

There is disagreement among grammarians of Arabic as to the origin of the expression labbayka. The most prevalent explanation analyses it as the verbal noun (maṣdar) labb (meaning to remain in a place) + ay (oblique form of the dual in construct) + ka (second-person singular masculine suffix). The dual is said to indicate repetition and frequency. Therefore, labbayka means literally something like "I will stick to obeying you again and again." Talbiyah is the verbal noun of labbá, meaning to pronounce this prayer.
