= Officers Training School =

Former Pakistani military academy

The Officers Training School (OTS) was a training institute for officers of Pakistan Armed Forces, specifically for the army and the navy. It was initially established in Kohat, Khyber Pakhtunkhwa, along with Pakistan Military Academy in 1948 to counter deficiency of Military Officers in the infant country. The training duration at the OTS academy at that time was 12 months where officers were allotted with PTC status (Pakistan Temporary Course) based on their age, not their performance. Officers Training School Kohat was abolished in 1961 after passing out 9 courses.

During the 1980s the Pakistani military again faced a shortage of Officers, commencing the OTS programme in 1982 again, continuing from the 10th OTS course. This time the academy was located in Mangla Cantonment. It was halted in 1990 after passing out the 23rd OTS course, later transitioning to the Junior Cadet Academy (JCA), which also halted in 1992.

== See also ==
- Sword of Honour (Pakistan)
