= List of formations of the Pakistan Army =

This is a list of formations of the Pakistan Army.

== Corps ==
- I Corps at Mangla Cantonment, Azad Kashmir
- II Corps at Multan Cantonment, Punjab
- IV Corps at Lahore, Punjab
- V Corps at Karachi, Sindh
- X Corps at Chaklala Cantonment, Punjab
- XI Corps at Peshawar, Khyber-Pakhtunkhwa
- XII Corps at Quetta, Balochistan
- XXX Corps at Gujranwala, Punjab
- XXXI Corps at Bahawalpur, Punjab

=== Administrative corps ===
- Pakistan Army Air Defence Corps
- Pakistan Army Artillery Corps
- Pakistan Army Armoured Corps
- Pakistan Army Aviation Corps
- Pakistan Armed Forces Band
- Pakistan Army Corps of Education
- Pakistan Army Corps of Electrical and Mechanical Engineering
- Pakistan Army Corps of Engineers
- Pakistan Army Education Corps
- Infantry Branch
- Judge Advocate General Branch
- Military Intelligence
- Pakistan Army Corps of Military Police
- Pakistan Army Medical Corps
- Pakistan Armed Forces Nursing Service
- Pakistan Army Ordnance Corps
- Pakistan Army Corps of Remount Veterinary and Farms
- Pakistan Army Corps of Service
- Pakistan Army Corps of Signals

== Regiments ==
=== Armoured regiments ===
- 5th Horse
- 6th Lancers at Rahim Yar Khan, Punjab
- 8th Cavalry at Bahawalnagar, Punjab
- 13th Lancers at Khyber-Pakhtunkhwa
- 15th Lancers
- 19th Lancers
- 20th Lancers
- 4th Cavalry at Nowshera, Khyber Pakhtunkhwa
- 11th Cavalry
- 12th Cavalry at Rawalpindi, Punjab
- 22nd Cavalry
- 23rd Cavalry
- 24th Cavalry
- 32nd Cavalry
- Guides Cavalry
- President's Bodyguard at Aiwan-e-Sadr

=== Infantry regiments ===
- Azad Kashmir Regiment
  - 1st Battalion
- Baloch Regiment
- Punjab Regiment
- Frontier Force Regiment
- Northern Light Infantry Regiment
- Sindh Regiment
  - 1st Battalion

=== Artillery regiments ===
- 21st Kohat Mountain Battery
- 23rd Peshawar Mountain Battery

=== Frontier Corps regiments ===
- Bajaur Scouts
- Bara Rifles
- Chagai Militia
- Chitral Scouts
- Dalbandin Rifles
- Dir Scouts
- Kharan Rifles
- King of the Khyber Rifles
- Khyber Rifles
- Kurram Militia
- Mahsud Scouts
- Mohmand Rifles
- Orakzai Scouts
- Shawal Rifles
- Taftan Rifles
- Zhob Militia

== Divisions ==
- 6th Armoured Division at Gujranwala, Punjab
- 7th Infantry Division at Peshawar, Khyber-Pakhtunkhwa
- 11th Infantry Division at Lahore, Punjab
- 12th Infantry Division at Murree, Punjab
- 34th Light Infantry Division at Chilas, Gilgit–Baltistan
- Force Command Northern Areas at Gilgit, Gilgit-Baltistan

== Independent brigades ==
- 105 Independent Infantry Brigade
- 105 Air Defence Independent Brigade Group
- 111 Independent Infantry Brigade at Rawalpindi
- 212 Infantry Brigade

== Commands ==
- Army Air Defence Command
- Army Strategic Forces Command
- Army Rocket Force Command

== See also ==
- List of serving generals of the Pakistan Army
- Structure of the Pakistan Army
