= Joint Chiefs of Staff Committee =

Administrative body of the Pakistan Armed Forces

- JCSC
- Flag of the Joint Chiefs of Staff
- Role: Advisory board providing professional military advice to the Minister of Defense and the President or the Prime Minister
- Established: 1972
- Constituting instrument: Constitution of Pakistan
- Predecessor entities: none
- Number of members: Four (Permanent)

Administration
- Parent agency: Ministry of Defense
- Seat: Joint Staff, HQ
- Abolished: 10 November 2025

The Joint Chiefs of Staff Committee (JCSC), (Urdu: ہیئتِ مشترکہَ رؤسائے افواجِ پاکستان); was an administrative body of senior high-ranking uniformed military leaders of the unified Pakistan Armed Forces who advised the civilian government of Pakistan, National Security Council, Defence minister, president and prime minister of Pakistan on important military and non-military strategic matters. It is defined by statute, and consisted of a chairman, the military chiefs from Army, Navy and the Air Force: all four-star officers appointed by the president, on the advice of the prime minister. The chairman was selected based on seniority and merit from the chiefs of service of the three branches of the Pakistan Armed and Defense Services. Each service chief, outside their Joint Chiefs of Staff obligations, performed their duty directly for the ministry of Defence.

Following the Hamoodur Rahman Commission, the Joint Chiefs of Staff Committee did not have operational command authority. Instead, the Joint Chief of Staff Committee was a principal military advisory body, and coordinates command operations between the services. The committee is headed by the four-star officer who is designated as the Chairman Joint Chiefs of Staff Committee (CJCSC). The chairman was the de Jure Commander in chief of all services of the Pakistan Armed Forces, but he does not have operational authority over combatant forces, which report directly to their Chiefs of Staff.

The Joint Staff, was headquartered in Rawalpindi near the vicinity of Naval, Air, GHQ headquarters. The Joint Chief of Staff Committee is composed of all uniformed military personnel from each inter-service, who assist the chairman to coordinate military efforts.

== Historical overview ==
=== Early years: 1950s–71 ===
In early 1950s, the recommendations were sent to the government of establishing the joint staff committee, but it was resisted by the Navy as it feared that it would be dominated by the army. As the military of Pakistan grew in size and political influence increased after the 1965 war with India. Though, the joint coordination mechanism was felt but no steps were taken.

Martial law was proclaimed all over in Pakistan for the second time on March 25, 1969, to curb civil disobedience which was especially chronic in East Pakistan. The number of army personnel in the Eastern region was increased in the beginning of 1971 fearing a possible Indian intervention.

As the crisis in East Pakistan progressed, following the intervention by India, the top military brass had the full control of the military and state's affairs. In the absence of the joint staff mechanism, the defence plans and executions of operations were oversaw by each inter-service which affected the overall performance of the armed forces. Coordination between each inter-service became increasingly difficult. In a thesis written by Pervez Cheema, the 1971 war was fought "without a purpose and with total lack of coordination between the civil effort and the armed forces, and between four fighting services: the Army, Navy and Air Force." Furthermore, the federal studies also noted that the top military brass had alienated the Army, Navy and Air Force. in which, none weren't taken in confidence, and the joint efforts were unsupported at either a planning or operational level, and were also constrained over disagreements during the Indo-Pakistani War of 1971. Due to lack of complete and comprehensive communication, each services blamed the others for operational failures.

=== Higher Direction of War act ===
As surrendered to India in 1971, Prime minister Zulfikar Ali Bhutto formed a federal commission chaired by Chief Justice Hamoodur Rahman to conduct federal studies on the failure of the civil-military relations. Recommendations noted in "Higher Direction of War act" in the HRC report, it strongly called for the establishment of Joint Chiefs of Staff Committee (JCSC) mechanism with headquartered in MoD. Per the act, the JCSC composed of a chairman, the Chief of Naval Staff, the Chief of Army Staff, and the Chief of Air Staff. It was mandate to have a collective responsibility of national defence and mechanism of plans based on a joint objectives. The chairmanship was to be rotated between each inter-services, irrespective of the personal ranks in each service.

Lesson learns and recommendations after the 1971 war with India, all military work, combat coordination, and joint missions are overseen by the Joint Chiefs of Staff Committee at the Joint Staff Headquarters located in Rawalpindi, Punjab, Pakistan. All studies were accepted in March 1976, the Joint Chiefs of Staff Committee was officially formed with army general Muhammad Shariff becoming its first Chairman Joint Chiefs of Staff Committee. It is headed by a four-star officer designated as chairman. As of 2011, there had been fourteen four-star Pakistan military officers who headed the Committee Secretariat. Altogether, there has been twelve were from the army, one from the Air Force, and two from the Navy have served.

The headquarters are known as Joint Staff Headquarters and act as secretariat of JCSC. It is located at Chaklala, Rawalpindi. As of 2022, General Sahir Shamshad Mirza is serving as the Chairman. The federal studies were fully supported by the military and many of the recommendations were implemented in 1980s to improve the joint efforts.

== Roles and responsibilities ==
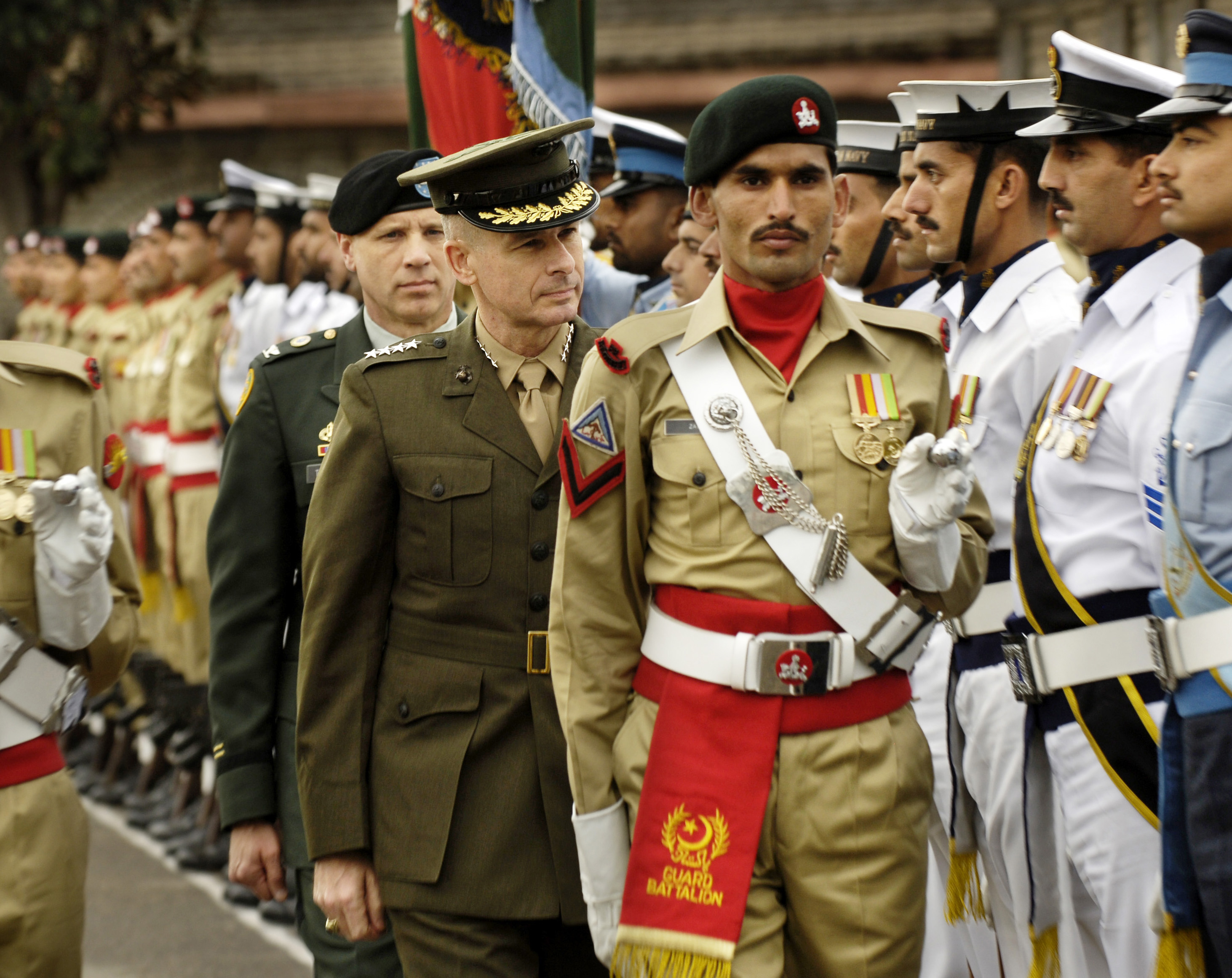
U.S. General Peter Pace at the JS HQ reviewing the Inter-Services, 2006.

Military failure in Bangladesh and war with India in 1971, the federal studies on civil military relations led by the Commission by Chief Justice Hamoodur Rahman helped establishing the Joint Chiefs of Staff Committee to coordinate the joint missions and executions of their work altogether during operations.

The Chairmanship of Joint Chiefs rotates among the three Inter-Services; the Chairman joint chiefs is appointed by the Prime minister and confirmed by the President. The Chairman of the Joint Chiefs of Staff Committee outranks all other four-star officers; however, he does not have operational command authority over the Armed Forces. In his capacity as chief military adviser, he assists the Prime Minister and the Minister of Defense in exercising their command functions.

Technically, the Joint Chiefs of Staff Committee is the highest military body; and its Chairman joint chiefs serves as the Principal Staff Officer (PSO) to the civilian Prime Minister, Cabinet, National Security Council (its adviser), and the President. The Joint Chiefs of Staff Committee deals with joint military planning, joint training, integrated joint logistics, and provides strategic directions of the armed forces. Reviews periodically the role, size, and shape of three Inter–Services, the Joint Chiefs of Staff Committee advise the civilian government on strategic communications, industrial mobilizations plans, and formulating the defence plans. In many ways, the JCSC provides an important link to understand, maintain balance, and resolve conflicts in the civil military relations between military and political circles. In times of peace, the Joint Chiefs of Staff Committee's principal functions are to conduct planning of civil–military input; in times of war, the Chairman acts as principal military adviser to the Prime Minister in the supervision and conduct of joint warfare.

== Members of the Committee (2021-2025) ==
Officials of the Joint Chiefs of Staff Committee
Position insignia	Position	Photo	Incumbent	Service branch	In Office Since
	Chief of the Army Staff (COAS)		General; Asim Munir	Pakistan Army	29 November 2022
	Chief of the Naval Staff (CNS)		Admiral; Naveed Ashraf	Pakistan Navy	07 October 2023
	Chief of the Air Staff (CAS)		Air Chief Marshal; Zaheer Ahmad Babar Sidhu	Pakistan Air Force	19 March 2021

Other officials of the Joint Chiefs of Staff Committee
Inter–Service appointments	Officials	Inter–Service branches	Tenure
DG Joint Staff	Lt. General Ahsan Gulrez	Pakistan Army	December 2022
DG SPD	Lt. General Yusuf Jamal	Pakistan Army	December 2022
Engineer-in-Chief	Lt. General Kashif Nazir	Pakistan Army	December 2022
DG ISPR	Maj. General Ahmed Sharif Chaudhry	Pakistan Army	December 2022
DG ISI	Lt. General Nadeem Anjum	Pakistan Army	November 2021
DG Joint Warfare & Training	Rear Admiral Abdul Basit Butt	Pakistan Navy	January 2021
DG Joint Logistics	AVM Syed Imran Majid Ali	Pakistan Air Force	September 2020
DG Joint Operations	AVM Shahid Mansoor Jahangiri	Pakistan Air Force	September 2020
DG Joint Foreign Military Cooperation	Maj.General Majid Jahangir	Pakistan Army	September 2020
DG Joint Cantonment, Gwadar	AVM Nasser ul Haq Wyne	Pakistan Air Force	September 2019
DG Joint Information and Intelligence Operations	Maj. General Waseem Iftikhar Cheema	Pakistan Army	April 2019
DG Operations and Planning	Maj. General Muhammad Ishaq Khattak	Pakistan Army	April 2019
Commandant Marines, Commander Coastal Areas	Vice Admiral Raja Rab Nawaz	Pakistan Navy	16 October 2014

=== Temporary members ===
Members and officials
Command	Current Commander	Inter–Service branch
Army Strategic Forces Command	Lieutenant General Muhammad Ali	Pakistan Army
Naval Strategic Forces Command	Rear Admiral Abdul Samad	Pakistan Navy
Air Force Strategic Command	AVM Tariq Zia	Pakistan Air Force

== Abolition of the office ==
The office of the Chairman of the Joint Chiefs of Staff Committee has been abolished following the enactment of the Constitution (Twenty-seventh Amendment) Act, 2025. The responsibilities of the office are now merged under the Chief of Defence Forces, who concurrently serves as the Chief of Army Staff.

== See also ==
- Joint Chiefs of Staff—United States
- Chiefs of Staff Committee—United Kingdom
- General Staff of the Armed Forces of the Russian Federation
- Joint Chiefs of Staff—South Korea
- Joint warfare
