= Ehsan Mehmood Khan =

Pakistani military person

Ehsan Mehmood Khan HI(M)
- Education: Pakistan Military Academy
- Military career
- Allegiance: Pakistan
- Branch: Pakistan Army
- Rank: Major General
- Unit: 34 Punjab Regiment
- Commands: DG National Guards; Commander Force Command Northern Areas; DG Pakistan Army Corps of Infantry
- Awards: Hilal-i-Imtiaz (Military)

Ehsan Mehmood Khan is a retired two-star general of the Pakistan Army, who served as the Director General Infantry at the General Headquarters in Rawalpindi.

== Education ==
Khan has done his PhD in Peace and Conflict Studies.

== Military career ==
Khan was commissioned into the 34 Punjab Regiment via the 22 OTS Course. In 2018, Khan was promoted to the rank Major General from Brigadier. As Force Commander Northern Areas, he oversaw military operations and civil-military initiatives in Gilgit-Baltistan. Later he served as Director General of the National Guard.

He also served as Director General Infantry at GHQ, Rawalpindi till retirement.

He was awarded the Hilal-i-Imtiaz by the then President of Pakistan in 2021 in recognition of his distinguished service.

== Publications ==
Khan is the author of the book Human Security in Pakistan, which discusses non-traditional security challenges facing the country. The book was published during his service as a Brigadier.

He is also the author of the book Comprehensive National Security: Contemporary Perspective, which discusses non-traditional security challenges facing the country.
