= Mona Remount Depot =

Pakistani Army horse facility

Remount Depot Mona (Urdu: ریمونٹ ڈپومونا)
- Active: 1902 - present
- Country: Pakistan
- Type: Supply depot
- Role: Primary horse breeding ground
- Size: Area of more than 10,000 hectares
- Website: Pakistan Army

Commanders
- Current commander: Brigadier Muhammad Tariq. Commandant

Army Remount Depot Mona is a depot of the Pakistan Army situated in Mandi Bahauddin, Punjab, Pakistan. It was established in 1902 and is home to breeding grounds for horses, mules and donkeys. It was originally designed to supply mountain artillery mules and general service mules.it comes under operational control of Pakistan Army Corps of Remount Veterinary and Farms or simply RVFC.

Mona is a full member of the World Arabian Horse Organization. It is the largest functional remount facility in the world and is spread over 10,000 hectares. There are over 600 Arabian mares at the depot.

The budget of the depot is issued by the Ministry of Defence (Pakistan).

== History ==
Mona started breeding horses in 1902. Donkey and mule breeding studs were established in 1906. The name Mona Depot was adopted from the local syed village Mona Syedan.

A museum at the Army Remount Depot Mona displays the carriages used by Muhammad Ali Jinnah, Queen Elizabeth II as well as those used in the early 19th century.

== Equitation school ==
The Army Equitation School trains officers and junior-ranked personnel of the Pakistan Army and the countries of Saudi Arabia, UAE, Bangladesh, Jordan, Malaysia, Sri Lanka and Nepal in equestrian sports such as polo, dressage, show jumping and riding.
