= Infantry Branch =

Infantry Branch may refer to:

- Royal Australian Infantry Corps, the organisation to which all Australian infantry regiments belong
- Royal Canadian Infantry Corps, the organisation to which all Canadian infantry regiments belong
- Infantry Branch (United States), a branch of the United States Army first established in 1775.
- Infantry Branch (Pakistan Army), a branch of the Pakistan Army first established in 1947.
