= Joint Staff Headquarters (Pakistan) =

Military headquarters of the Pakistan Armed Forces

- Patch of the Inter-Services of Pakistan Armed Forces.

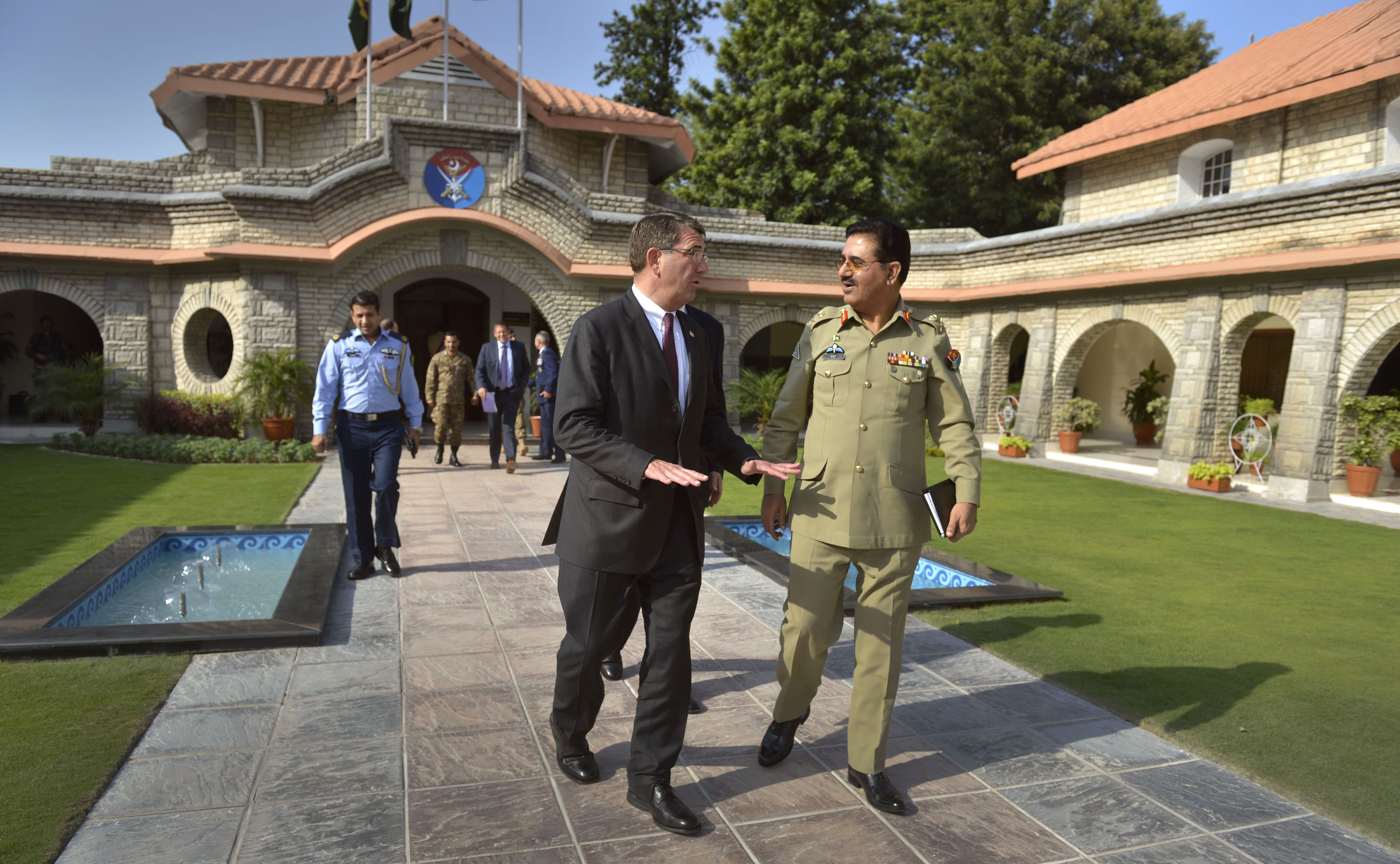
- The courtyard of the JS HQ in Chaklala, Rawalpindi, Punjab in Pakistan.
- Interactive map of the Joint Staff Headquarters area
- Alternative names: JS HQ

General information
- Architectural style: Classical Revival, Modern, and Stripped Classicism
- Location: Chaklala, Rawalpindi-46210, Punjab in Pakistan
- Coordinates: 33°35′45″N 73°05′24″E
- Year built: 1972–77
- Opened: 1976
- Owner: Ministry of Defence (MoD)

Design and construction
- Engineer: Pakistan Army Corps of Engineers
- Designations: JS HQ

Website
- JS HQ Website

A flag of the JS HQ.

The Joint Staff Headquarters (reporting name:JS HQ) is the military headquarters of the Pakistan Armed Forces at the vicinity of the Chaklala, Rawalpindi, Punjab in Pakistan.

Constructed on an accelerated schedule in 1972, the JS HQ, which also includes the post of Army GHQ, serves as a principle headquarters of the Pakistan Armed Forces with concerns relating to higher direction of war, operational planning, and deterrence developments.

== Historical background ==
From 1947–71, the Pakistan's Army GHQ had been a central and focal strategic planning center for military operations with most taken on army's point of view. The Pakistani troops and sailors deployed in the Eastern Command and the Western formations had fought Indian Armed Forces without the mission clarity and without the ground, air, and sea line of strategic communication.

The War Enquiry Commission was very critical of the performance of the military from 1947–71, and stressed it on a singular command structure to provide combat synergy between nation's each armed service. In 1976, the bureaucratic structure was modeled and build in an accelerated schedule by establishing the JS HQ, which was set up to improve coordination, command, and communication between the branches of the Pakistan Armed Forces. In 1977, the JS HQ began to issue directives on mission parameters and requirements for development of nuclear weapon design to the nation's weapons laboratories.

In 1984—86, many of the Army GHQ's directorates, mainly the weapon system procurement, deployments, weapon selections, and overall mission preparedness and execution of the military operations, were transferred to the JS HQ in light of recommendations provided by the War Enquiry Commission (1975) and the Packard Commission (1985). This directive strengthened the role of the JS HQ's command and control of the Pakistani military with chiefs of the staff of army, navy, and air force, still maintain their control of their respected services.

Besides the nuclear command and control, the JS HQ provides the control, clarity, mission parameters, objectives, selection of weapon system to nation's armed services to execute the mission and attain objectives.

== Branches of the Joint Staff ==
The Director of the Joint Staff, an army officer holding a rank of Lieutenant-General, controls the office operations of the JS HQ, and oversees the directorates run by either a Rear-Admiral or an Air Marshal.

- Branches at the JS HQ (Source: More citations needed)
  - Chairman Joint Chiefs Secretariat (CJCSC Secy.)
    - Military Secretary at Ministry of Defense
    - Director-General Joint Staff
  - Joint Staff Branch (JS Brnch.)
    - Dte. of Joint Warfare and Training
    - Dte. of Joint Information and Intelligence
    - Dte. Joint Operations and Planning
    - Dte. Joint Logistics
    - Dte. Joint Military Operations
    - Dte. Joint Foreign Military Cooperation
    - Dte. Joint Special Operations
  - Strategic Planning Branch (—)
    - Dte. Strategic Plans Division
    - DG Inter-Services Intelligence
    - DG Maritime Technology Complex
    - DG Pakistan Ordnance Factories
    - DG Air Weapons Complex
    - DG Inter-Services Public Relations

Source: Siddiqa-Agha, A. (20 March 2001). Pakistan's Arms Procurement and Military Buildup, 1979-99: In Search of a Policy. Springer. pp. 47–48. ISBN 978-0-230-51352-5.

== Organizations ==
- Global Industrial Defence Solutions
- Inter-Services Intelligence
- Inter-Services Public Relations
- Inter-Services Selection Board
- Military Engineer Services
- National Defense University
- Pakistan Armed Forces Band
- Pakistan Armed Services Board
- Inter-Services Nursing Service
- Strategic Plans Division

== Joint Staff Command in Media ==
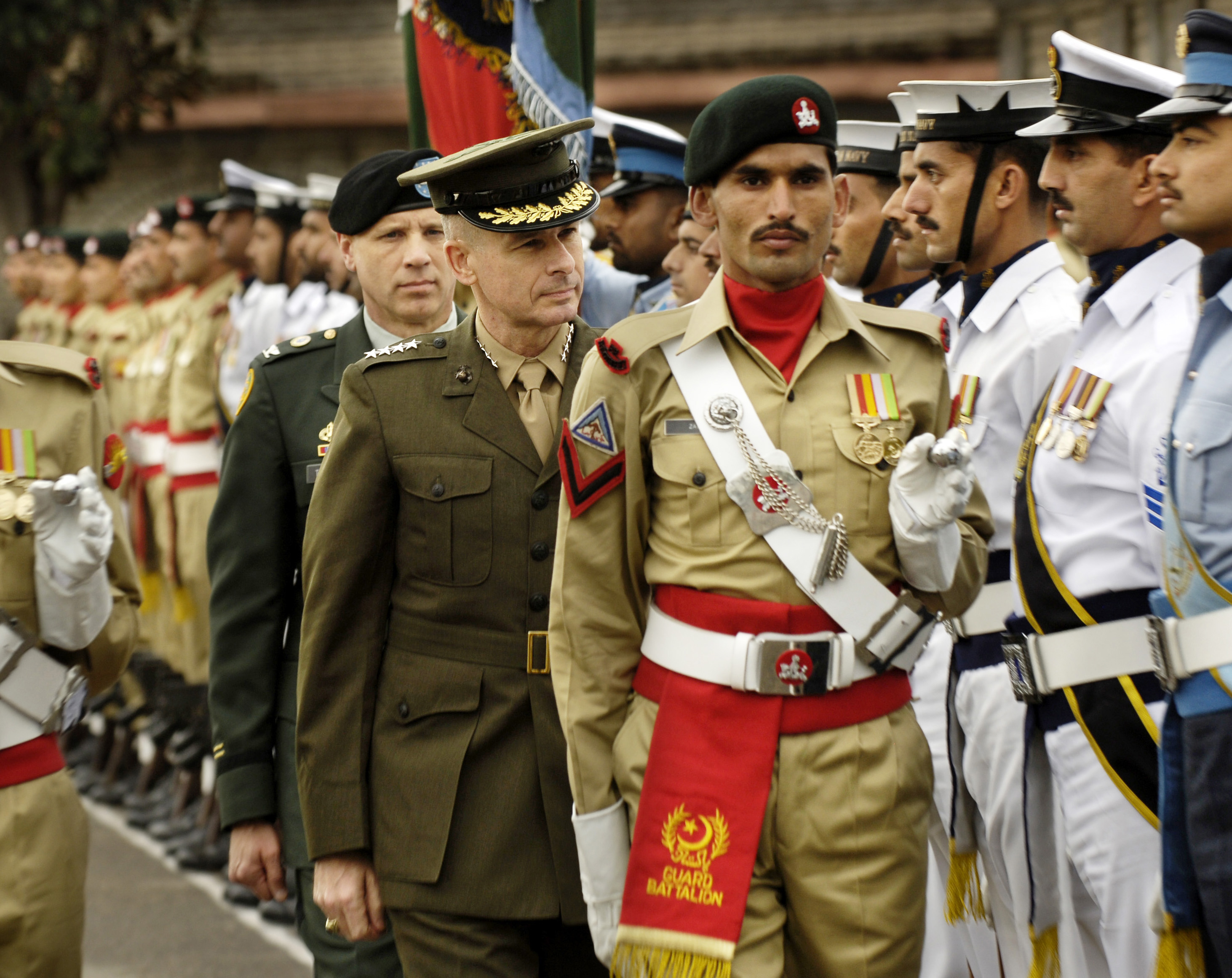
General Peter Pace reviewing parade at the JS HQ.

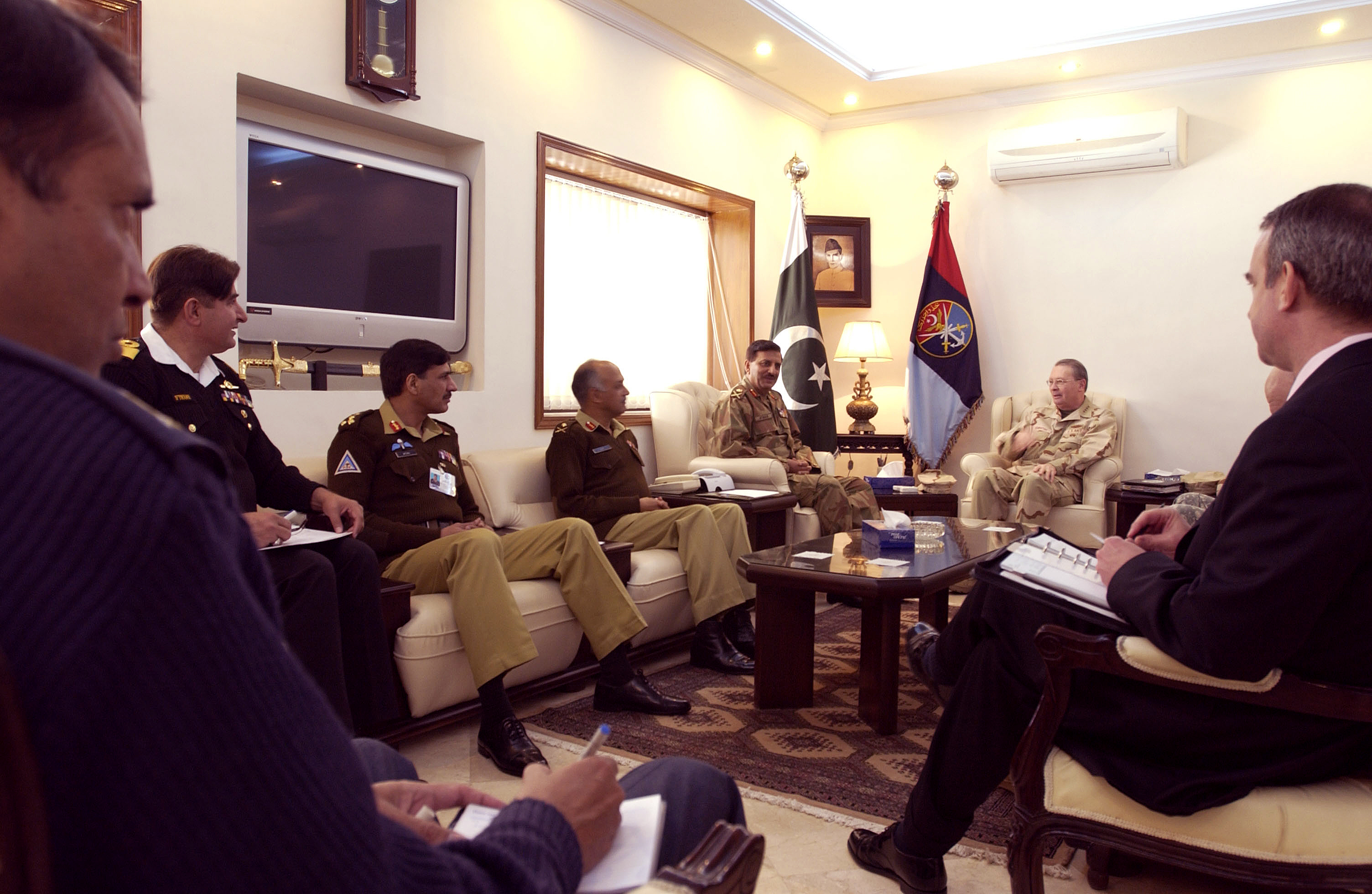
A briefing sessions of Inter-Services personnel at JS HQ.

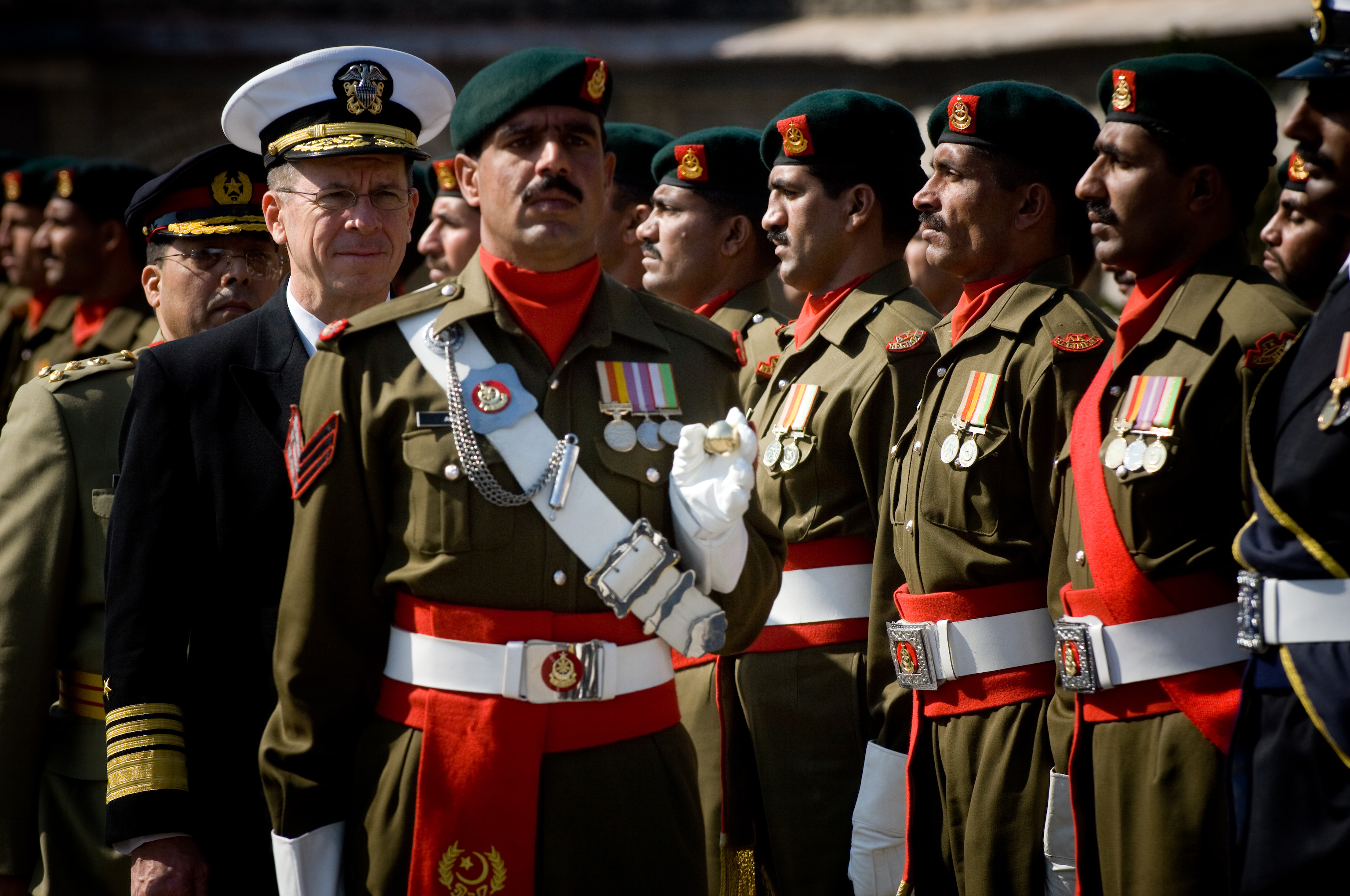
Admiral Mike Mullen reviewing parade at the JS HQ.

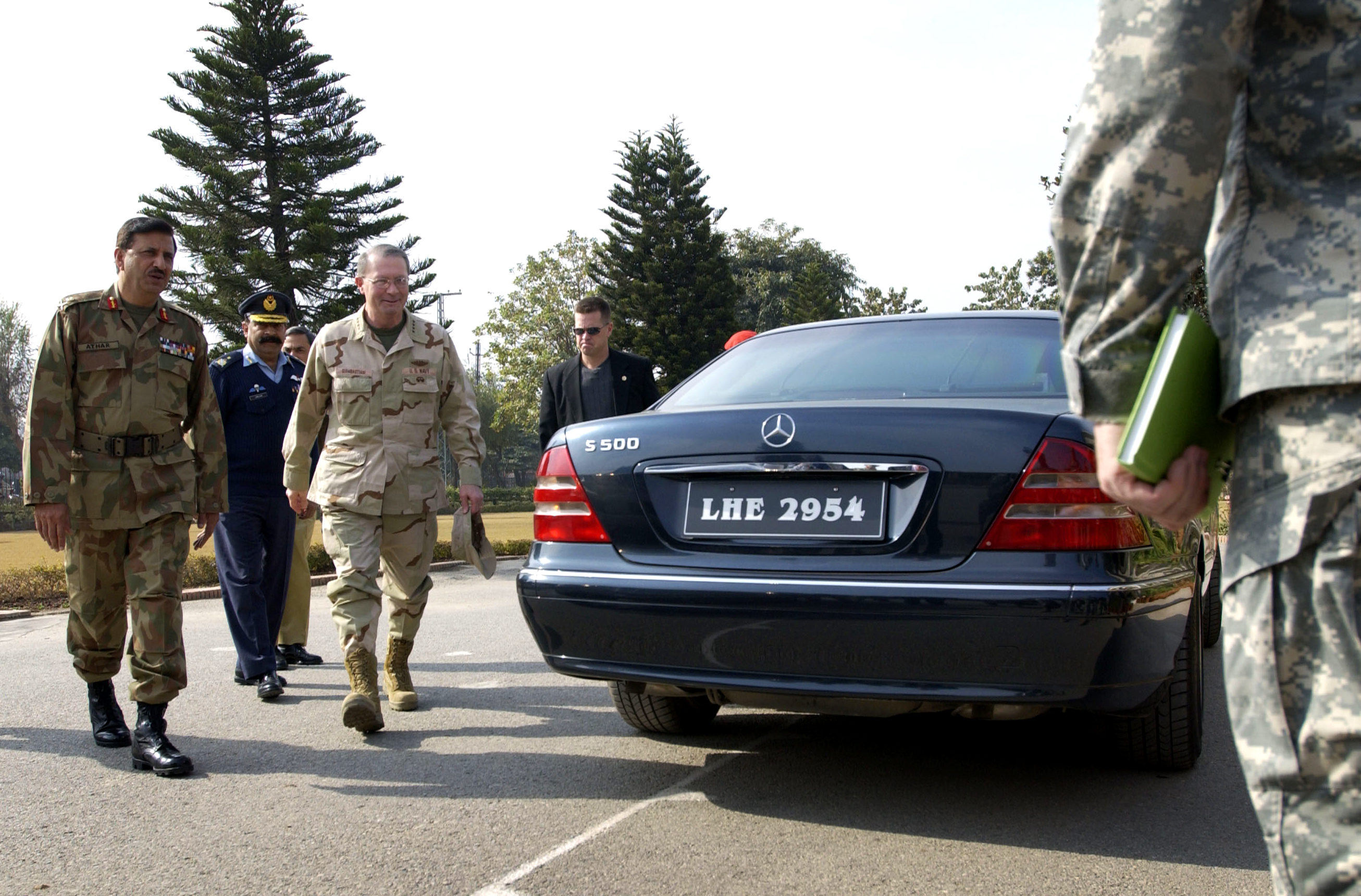
An outside view of JS HQ.

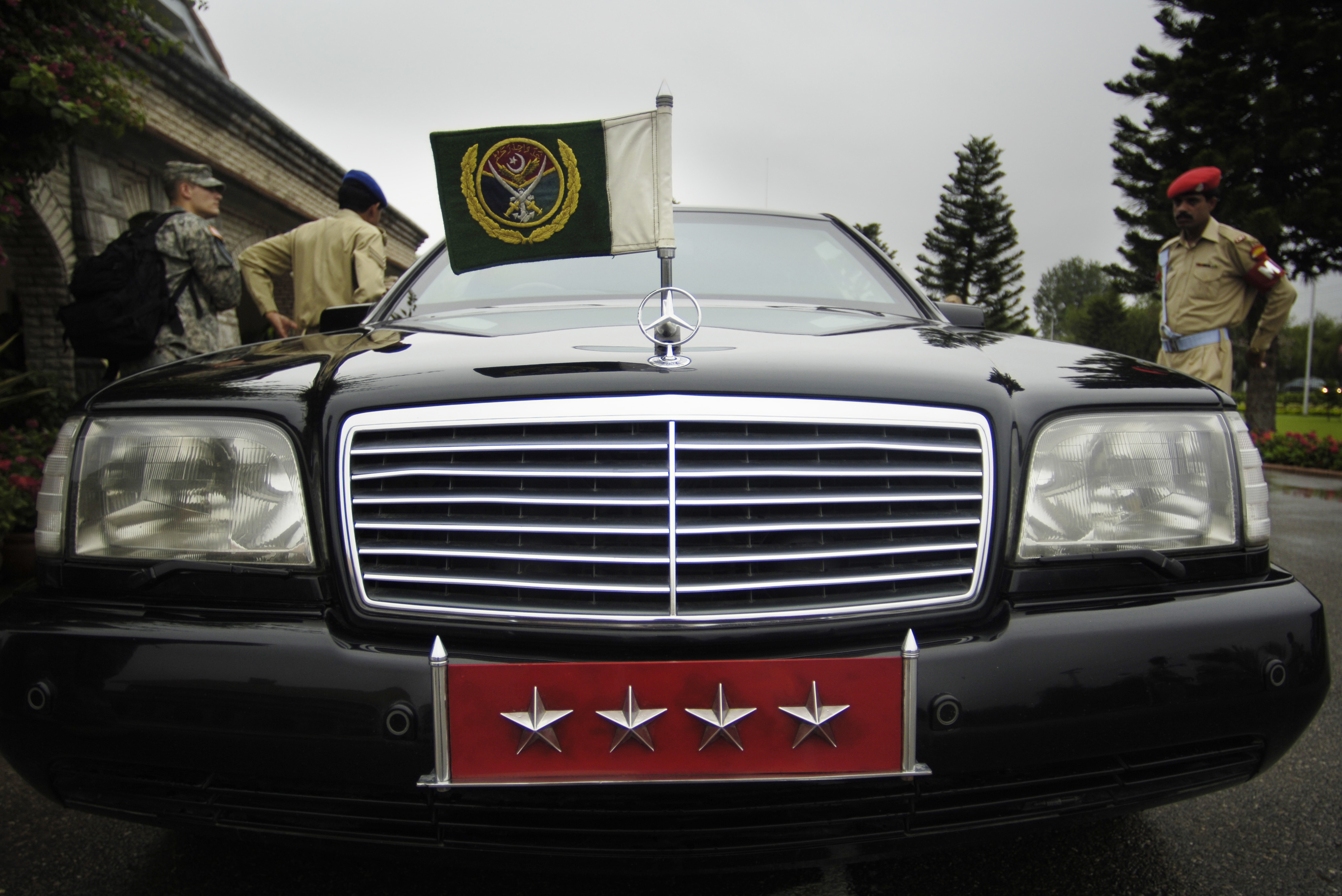
The military vehicle designed for the Chairman Joint Chiefs with four-star visibly marked.

== See also ==
- Air Headquarters
- General Headquarters
- Naval Headquarters
