= Pakistan Military Accounts Department =

Pakistan Military Accounts Department (PMAD)
- Abbreviation: PMAD
- Region served: Pakistan
- Parent organization: Ministry of Defence as per Rules of Business 1973 and Ministry of Finance as per CGA Ordinance 2001
- Website: pmad.gov.pk

Pakistan Military Accounts Department (PMAD) is an attached department of the Ministry of Defence as per Rules of Business 1973 but as per Controller General of Accounts (CGA) Ordinance, 2001 it is field office of CGA and subordinate office of Ministry of Finance . PMAD IDC officers directly come under the administrative control of Auditor General of Pakistan (AGP) and Controller General Accounts those are attached department of Ministry of Finance. It is primarily responsible for making payments to the armed forces, maintaining its accounts and providing financial advice to the defense authorities.It reports all expenditure related to defence to CGA and onward transmit to Ministry of Finance

== Functions ==
PMAD's primary responsibilities encompass the upkeep of Defence Services accounts, disbursing salaries & benefits to Commissioned Officers, JCOs/ORs, and civilians who are compensated from Defence Services Estimates. Additionally, it manages the auditing and payment processes for both local and imported stores, as well as the auditing and payment procedures related to Defence Services Works. PMAD also oversees internal auditing, the compilation of Defence Services receipts/expenditures, the creation of Appropriation Accounts, and the settlement of Railway and PIA Claims associated with the Defence Side. PMAD undertakes a dual role, that is, it handles both accounting and internal auditing tasks.

== Changes in pension payments ==
In November 2023, Pakistan Post announced that it would stop paying pensions to military accounts. This amount will be transferred to the banks from December 1. The decision was taken to meet the requirements of the Financial Action Task Force (FATF) after it failed to digitize its accounts.

== Sports activities ==
PMAD also organizes sports activities. For example, during the Pakistan Military Accounts Department, a cricket match was played between Peshawar and Wah Cantt teams. Apart from this, Pakistan Military Accounts Sports Festival 2017 was inaugurated at Qayyum Stadium.

== Legal issues ==
In 2014, in a notable legal case, the Sindh High Court (SHC) suspended the notification proceedings regarding the transfer of the Controller of Naval Accounts.
