= Gora Prai airstrike =

2008 War in Afghanistan incident

Coordinates: 34.71°N 71.12°E

- Part of the War in Afghanistan, Pakistan–United States skirmishes
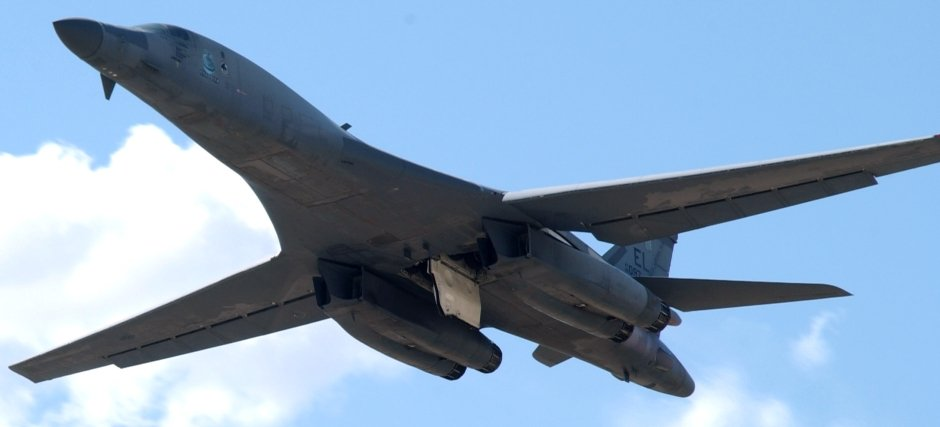
- A B-1 Lancer bomber
- Type: Aerial attack
- Location: Mohmand Agency, FATA, Pakistan
- Target: Taliban
- Date: June 10, 2008
- Executed by: United States
- Casualties: 11 Pakistani paramilitaries, including 1 regular army major killed (Pakistan claim); 8 Taliban militants killed (US claim)

The Gora Prai airstrike was an airstrike by the United States that resulted in the deaths of 11 paramilitary troops of the Pakistan Army Frontier Corps and 8 Taliban fighters in Pakistan's tribal areas. The attack took place late on June 10, 2008, during clashes between US coalition forces and militants from the Pakistani Taliban.

The airstrike was in retaliation for an attack on troops about 200 yards (180 m) inside Afghan territory, originating from a wooded area near the Pakistani border checkpoint at Gorparai in Pakistan's Mohmand Agency.

== Events ==
On June 9, Afghan troops occupied a mountaintop position in a disputed border zone, but began to withdraw the next day following Pakistan's request.

On June 10, Afghan troops, coalition forces and Taliban militants clashed near the border with Pakistan. The Afghan Taliban said it had attacked Afghan troops with 60 to 100 of its fighters when they attempted to set up bunkers and outposts on Pakistani soil. Taliban spokesperson Maulvi Umar claimed to have killed 40 Afghan troops, captured several and shot down a NATO helicopter. He also said eight Taliban troops died in the clash. A U.S. military official stated that coalition forces "were running company- and battalion-sized operations" in Afghanistan's Kunar Province when they were engaged by Taliban forces, who then fled across the border into Pakistan. Two U.S. Air Force F-15E strike fighters and one B-1 bomber entered Pakistani airspace in pursuit of these fighters and dropped about a dozen 500-pound (225 kg) laser-guided munitions on them.

The U.S. military says that it informed Pakistan it was engaged in fighting anti-Afghan forces in the area, but Pakistan denied being notified of the air strike and the fighting.

== Deaths ==
A Pakistani security official said the dead included a major in the Pakistan Army. All were from the Mohmand Rifles, a paramilitary detachment of the Frontier Corps, the force deployed in Pakistan's tribal areas bordering Afghanistan.

== Reactions ==
Pakistan's military released a statement condemning the air strike as "unprovoked and cowardly" and stated that it "had hit at the very basis of co-operation" in the "war on terror". It also reiterated that it reserved "the right to protect our citizens and soldiers against aggression". Yousaf Raza Gillani, the Prime Minister of Pakistan, told Pakistan's Parliament: "We will take a stand for sovereignty, integrity and self-respect, and we will not allow our soil [to be attacked]."

The United States' Pentagon defended the response to the attack by the Taliban. Press Secretary Geoff Morrell said "In these early hours after this strike every indication we have is that this was a legitimate strike against forces that had attacked members of the coalition". He declined to confirm that Pakistani troops were killed in the attack. US officials asserted that the airstrike was not aimed at Pakistani soldiers and its response was coordinated with Pakistani security officials. Gonzalo Gallegos, a State Department spokesman, said that the United States was "sad to see the loss of life among the Pakistani military, who are our partners in fighting terror."

United States embassy in Islamabad stated that "the United States regrets that actions in Mohmand Agency the night of June 10 resulted in the reported casualties among Pakistani forces, who are our partners in the fight against terrorism. We express our condolences to the families of those who lost their lives."

== See also ==
- Chenagai airstrike
- Damadola airstrike
- Waziristan War
- War on terrorism
- Civilian casualties
