= Frontier Corps Khyber Pakhtunkhwa (North) =

Pakistani paramilitary force

Frontier Corps Khyber Pakhtunkhwa (North) سرحد واہنی خیبر پختونخواہ (شمالی)
- Abbreviation: FCKP(N)

Agency overview
- Formed: 2017; 9 years ago

Jurisdictional structure
- Federal agency: Pakistan
- Operations jurisdiction: Pakistan
- Governing body: Ministry of Interior
- Constituting instrument: Frontier Corps Ordinance, 1959
- General nature: Federal law enforcement
- Specialist jurisdictions: Paramilitary law enforcement, counter insurgency, riot control; National border patrol, security, integrity

Operational structure
- Overseen by: Pakistan Army
- Headquarters: Bala Hisar Fort, Peshawar
- Elected officer responsible: Mohsin Raza Naqvi, Minister of Interior
- Agency executive: Major General Rao Imran Sartaj, Inspector General
- Parent agency: Civil Armed Forces

Website
- www.interior.gov.pk/index.php/hq-frontier-corps-kpk-peshawar

The Frontier Corps Khyber Pakhtunkhwa (North) (Urdu: سرحد واہنی خیبر پختونخواہ (شمالی), romanised: Sarhad Wahini Khaibar Pakhtonkhwah (Shmali), reporting name: FCKP(N)), is a federal paramilitary force in Pakistan, operating in the northern part of Khyber Pakhtunkhwa province, overseeing the country's borders with Afghanistan and assisting with maintaining law and order. It is one of four Frontier Corps with the others being: FC Khyber Pakhtunkhwa (South) stationed in the south of Khyber Pakhtunkhwa province, and FC Balochistan (North) and FC Balochistan (South) stationed in Balochistan province.

The Frontier Corps are often confused with Frontier Constabulary as both forces abbreviated as ''FC''. Frontier Corps are group of four paramilitary forces officered by the Pakistan Army. On other hand, Frontier Constabulary is unified force officered by the Police Service of Pakistan.

The Corps is headed by a seconded inspector general, who is a Pakistan Army officer of at least major-general rank, although the force itself is officially under the jurisdiction of the Interior Ministry.

The Corps consists of several infantry regiments, themselves composed of one or more battalion-sized wings. Some of the regiments were raised during the colonial era. These include the Chitral Scouts, the Khyber Rifles, the Kurram Militia, the Tochi Scouts, the South Waziristan Scouts, and the Zhob Militia. The Khyber Rifles was in fact regularised during the Indo-Pakistani War of 1965 and fought with distinction in Kashmir.

== History ==
The Frontier Corps was created in 1907 by Lord Curzon, the viceroy of British India, in order to organise seven militia and scout units in the tribal areas along the border with Afghanistan: the Khyber Rifles, the Zhob Militia, the Kurram Militia, the Tochi Scouts, the Chagai Militia, the South Waziristan Scouts and the Chitral Scouts.

The Frontier Corps was led by an "inspecting officer" who was a British officer of the rank of lieutenant colonel. In 1943 the inspecting officer was upgraded to an inspector general (an officer with the rank of brigadier), and the corps was expanded with the addition of new units—the Second Mahsud Scouts (raised in 1944) and the Pishin Scouts (in 1946).

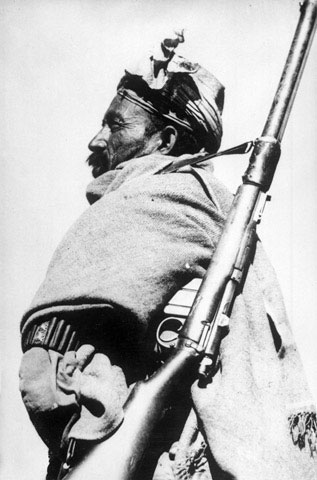
A member of the Khyber Rifles circa 1948

After Pakistan and India became independent in 1947, Pakistan expanded the corps further by creating a number of new units, including the Thal Scouts, the Northern Scouts, the Bajaur Scouts, the Karakoram Scouts, the Kalat Scouts, the Dir Scouts and the Kohistan Scouts. British officers continued to serve in the Frontier Corps up to the early 1950s. The corps was split into two major subdivisions with FC Balochistan incorporating the Zhob Militia, the Sibi Scouts, the Kalat Scouts, the Makran Militia, the Kharan Rifles, the Pishin Scouts, the Chaghai Militia and the First Mahsud Scouts. In 1975 three units, the Gilgit Scouts, the Karakoram Scouts and the Northern Scouts, were merged to form a new paramilitary force called the Northern Light Infantry, which is now a full infantry regiment of the Pakistan Army.

In the late 1990s, the Frontier Corps played an important role in eliminating opium poppy cultivation from Dir District in Khyber Pakhtunkhwa.

In 2007, after the collapse of truce agreements between the Pakistani government and local militants, the Frontier Corps, teamed with regular Pakistani military units, conducted incursions into tribal areas controlled by the militants. The effort produced a series of bloody and clumsy confrontations. On August 30, about 250 Pakistani troops, mostly from the Frontier Corps, surrendered to militants without a fight. In early November, most were released in exchange for 25 militants held by the Pakistan Army.

There is a widespread consensus among United States government military and intelligence experts that the Frontier Corps are the best potential military units against the Islamist militants because its troops are locally recruited, know local languages and understand local cultures. The United States provided more than US$7 billion in military aid to Pakistan from 2002 to 2007, most of which was used to equip the Frontier Corps because it is in the front line of the fight against the Islamist insurgents. From late 2007, the Pakistani government intended to expand the corps to 100,000 and use it more in fighting Islamist militants, particularly Al-Qaeda, after extensive consultations with the U.S. government, with a multi-year plan to bolster the effort, including the establishment of a counterinsurgency training centre. The US Obama policy for Pakistan was seen as a clear victory for the Pakistan Army lobby in the US. The $1.5 billion a year unrestricted aid recently announced will go a long way in seeing that the Frontier Corps stay at the height of their professional abilities due to new equipment and training.

The Corps has also fired occasionally on the U.S.-assisted Afghan Army.

== Role ==
- Border security duties.
- Assist Army/FCNA in the defense of the country as and when required.
- Protect important communication centers and routes.
- Undertake counter militancy/criminal/terrorism operations on orders.
- Assist law enforcement agencies in maintenance of law and order.
- Safeguard important sites and assets

During times of difficulties, the government occasionally gives the FC the power to arrest and detain suspects such as in late 2012 and early 2013 when the Prime Minister of Pakistan granted the FC policing powers. These temporary powers can also be extended on the orders or consent of the provincial government or federal government or both.

== Organisation ==
The senior command posts are filled by officers seconded from the Pakistan Army for two to three years. The Corps consists of eleven infantry regiments, most of which are composed of a number of battalion-sized "wings", one armoured regiment, and a number of training and support units.

Inspector General FC KPK North
Major General Rao Imran Sartaj
Units
**Independent Scouts Cavalry Regiment	Bara Rifles (1944)	Kohistan Scouts (raised in 1977)	Dir Scouts (raised in 1970)
**Intelligence Unit	Bajaur Scouts (raised in 1961)	Chitral Scouts (formed in 1903)	Swat Scouts
Mohmand Rifles	Khyber Rifles (1878)	Mahsud Scouts	Orakzai Scouts
Tirah Rifles	Special Operation Wing	Interior Ministry support	50 Aviation Squadron
Artillery Unit
Armoured Unit

== Personnel ==
In January 2022 during press briefing Pakistan military spokesperson General Babar Iftikhar says, As a part of Pakistan's Western border management, 67 new wings has been established for the FC Balochistan and FC Khyber Pakhtunkhwa to strengthen border security and formation of the six more wings is in process.

== Equipment ==
=== Basic Equipment ===
- GIDS Ballistic Helmet
- Bullet Proof vests
- GIDS Knee pads

=== Small Arms ===
- VSK-100: The VSK 100 is essentially a Belarusian version of the AKM.
- QBZ-95: Used by the Special Operations Group (SOG) anti-terrorist unit
- H&K G3: POF Made G3 Battle Rifles
- AK-47: Multiple Variants in service
- MG3: POF Made MG1A3 variant in service
- PK-16: POF made Dshk heavy machine gun
- Type-85: Chinese 12.7mm HMG
- RPG-7: Rocket Propelled Grenade
- Type-79: Chinese variant of the Dragonuv Sniper rifle

=== Mortars and Artillery ===
- MO-120RT: 120mm Mortar
- LLR-81 Mortar: 81mm Mortar

=== Vehicles ===
- Toyota Land Cruiser Prado: VIP transport
- Toyota Hilux: Main Utility and troop/officer transport vehicle
- Land Rover Defender: Utility Vehicle
- Mitsubishi L-200: Utility Vehicle
- Hino Ranger: Troop/Supply transport

=== Armoured Vehicles ===
The Frontier Corps operates various HIT made armoured vehicles.

- Mohafiz: Unknown numbers in service.
- Type-59 Tank: Type-59II variant in service. Handed over to Frontier Corps by Pakistan Army
- Type-69 Tank: Type-69IIMP Variant in service. Also handed over by Pakistan army.
- T-55M: Modernised T-55 MBT. Number of Ex-Serbian units procured in 2020.

=== Aircraft ===
The Corps has access to the aviation resources of the Pakistan Army.

== Inspectors general ==
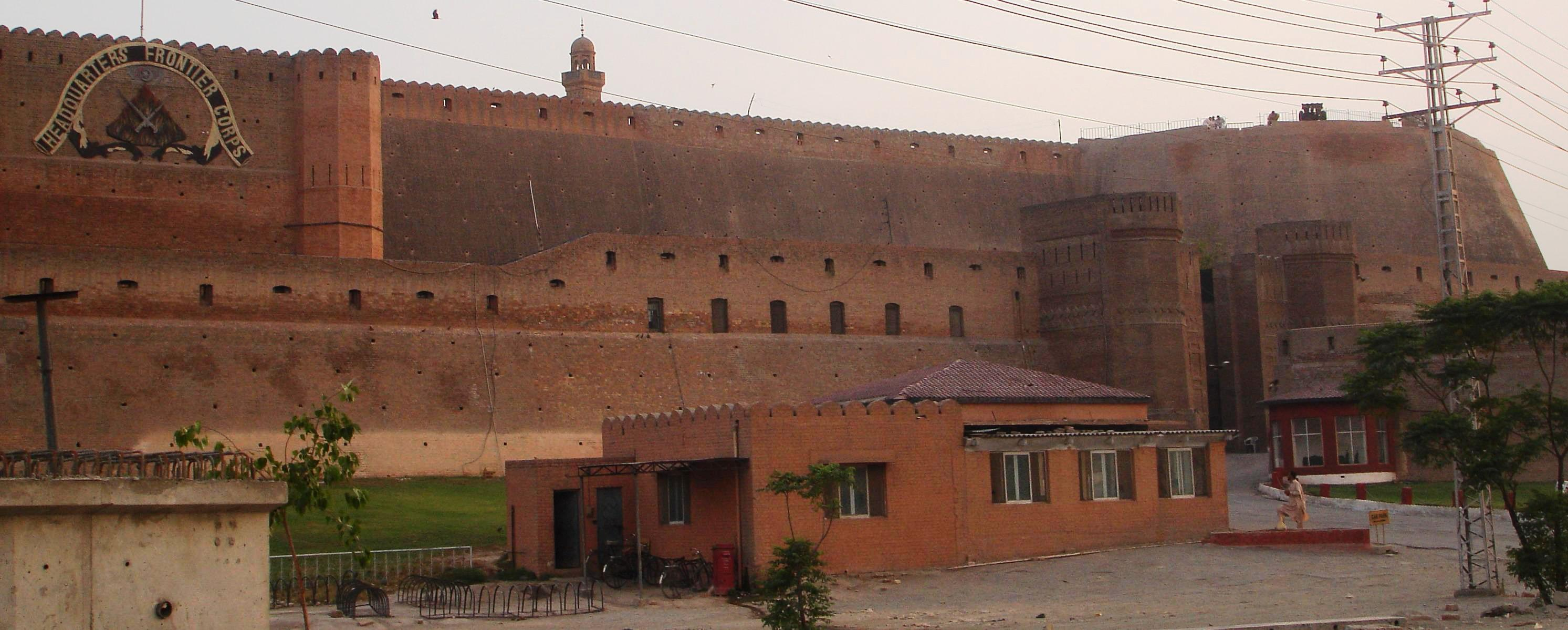
Frontier Corps headquarters in Bala Hisar Fort, Peshawar, Khyber Pakhtunkhwa, Pakistan

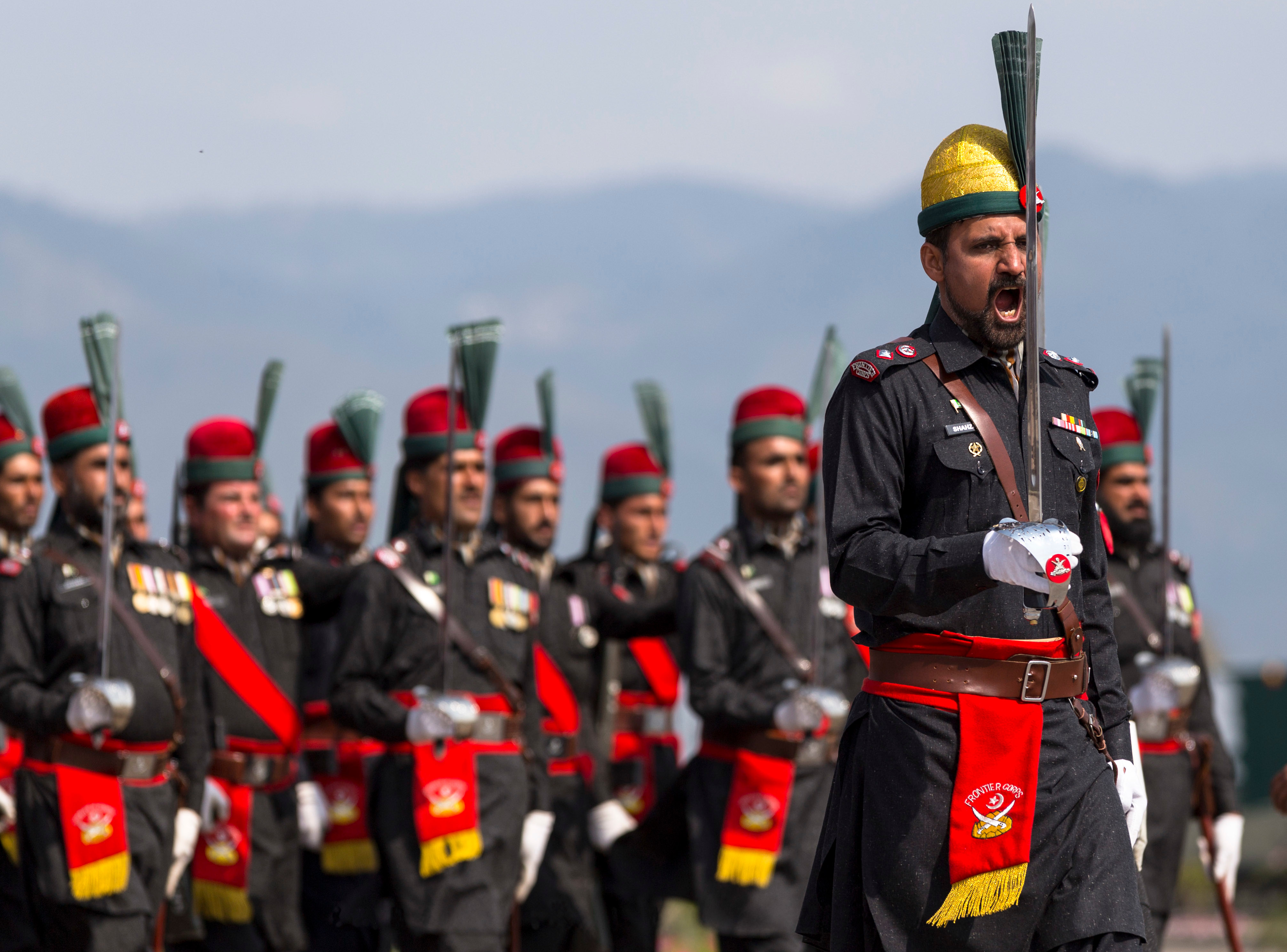
A contingent from Frontier Corps, Khyber Pakhtunkhwa marching in black security forces uniform

The Corps was divided into FC NWFP and FC Balochistan in 1974. The inspectors general listed below are from 1974 to 2017. For previous inspectors general, see the Frontier Corps article.

1. Maj. Gen. Ghulam Rabbani Khan, SBt (1974–78)
2. Maj. Gen. Agha Zulfiqar Ali Khan (1978–81)
3. Maj. Gen. Mian Muhammad Afzaal HI(M) SBt OKA(M) (Shaheed) (1982–84)
4. Maj. Gen. Arif Bangash, SBt (1984–86)
5. Maj. Gen. Mohammad Shafiq, SBt (1986–88)
6. Maj. Gen. Ghazi ud Din Rana, SBt (1988–90)
7. Maj. Gen. Humayun Khan Bangash, TBt (1990–91)
8. Maj. Gen. Muhammad Naeem Akbar Khan (1991–92)
9. Maj. Gen. Mumtaz Gul, TBt (1992–94)
10. Maj. Gen. Fazal Ghafoor, SBt (1994–97)
11. Maj. Gen. Sultan Habib (1997–2000)
12. Maj. Gen. Tajul Haq (2000–03)
13. Maj. Gen. Hamid Khan (2003–04)
14. Maj. Gen. Tariq Masood (2004–06)
15. Maj. Gen. Alam Khattak (2006–08)
16. Maj. Gen. Tariq Khan (2008–10)
17. Maj. Gen. Nadir Zeb (2010–2012)
18. Maj. Gen. Ghayur Mehmood, TBt (2012–2014)
19. Maj. Gen. Tayyab Azam (2014–2016)
20. Maj. Gen. Shaheen Mazhar Mehmood (2016–2017)

In 2017 FC KP was split into FC KP (North) and FC KP (South).

1. Maj. Gen. Muhammad Waseem Ashraf (2017–2018)
2. Maj. Gen. Rahat Naseem Ahmed Khan (2018 – Dec 2020)
3. Maj. Gen. Adil Yamin (Dec 2020 – Aug 2022)
4. Maj. Gen. Noor Wali Khan (August 2022 – August 2024)
5. Maj. Gen. Anjum Riaz (August 2024– July 2025)
6. Maj. Gen. Rao Imran Sartaj (July 2025–To date)

== See also ==
- Law enforcement in Pakistan
- Civil Armed Forces
- Military history of the North-West Frontier
- Insurgency in Khyber Pakhtunkhwa
