= Pakistan Army Corps of Education =

Pakistan Army's staff corps for education & training

- Badge of the Pakistan Army Education Corps
- Active: 1951; 75 years ago
- Country: Pakistan
- Branch: Pakistan Army
- Type: Combat service support
- Role: Administrative and staffing oversight.
- Size: Varies
- HQ/Garrison: Army GHQ in Rawalpindi, Punjab in Pakistan
- Nickname: AEC
- Colors Identification: Blue
- Anniversaries: 1951
- Engagements: Military history of Pakistan
- Website: Army Education Corps

Commanders
- Director-General: Maj-Gen. Kamal Anwar Chaudhry
- Notable commanders: Gen. Muhammad Shariff

Insignia
- War Flag

The Pakistan Army Corps of Education is a military administrative branch of the Pakistan Army. The education corps is headquartered in Army GHQ with Maj-Gen. Kamal Anwar Chaudhry serving its director-general since 2023.

== Overview ==
The Corps of Education was commissioned in the services of the Pakistan Army in 1951, but renamed it as Army Education Corps (AEC) in 1954. The Army Education Corps was formed to address the issue of literacy in the nation and to address the challenge of soldiers being qualified as privates to start their careers in the military.

Since its establishment in 1951, the army education corps oversees its massive operations of military-run schools, community colleges, and universities. The education corps is widely credited for improving literacy in the country while it also promotes nationalism in the country. Despite the impeding quality of education in rural areas, the army education corps has been credited for providing the education and literacy to its recruits while qualifying them for technical skills that helped the military and nation move towards the industrialization.

However, the education and admission to the military-run universities are not restricted to the Pakistani military personnel but also admits larger numbers of civilians. The primary mission of the army education corps is to raise the educational and technical standards of the recruits before heading to the military academy and eventually joining the army.

The Army Education Corps is commanded by the two-star rank, major-general, who works under the Inspector-General of Training and Evaluation (IG&T) at the Army GHQ in Rawalpindi, Punjab in Pakistan.
