= Muhammad Shariff (general) =

Pakistani general (1921–1999)

Muhammad Shariff NI(M) SPk SI(M)

1st Chairman Joint Chiefs of Staff Committee
- In office 1 March 1976 – 22 January 1977
- Preceded by: None (Post created)
- Succeeded by: Mohammad Shariff

Personal details
- Born: Muhammad Shariff; 22 February 1921 Lahore, Punjab, British India
- Died: 6 August 1999 (aged 78) Lahore, Punjab, Pakistan
- Resting place: Lahore, Punjab, Pakistan
- Nickname: M. Shariff

Military service
- Allegiance: (British Raj) British India (1942–1947); Pakistan (1947–1977)
- Branch/service: (British Raj) British Indian Army; Pakistan Army
- Years of service: 1942–1977
- Rank: General
- Unit: 3/2 Punjab Regiment
- Commands: Chairman Joint Chiefs of Staff; II Corps in Multan; Permanent Rep. at CENTO; GOC 33rd Infantry Division, Quetta; Pakistan Army Education Corps; Ins-Gen. Training and Evaluation
- Battles/wars: World War II; Indo-Pakistani War of 1965
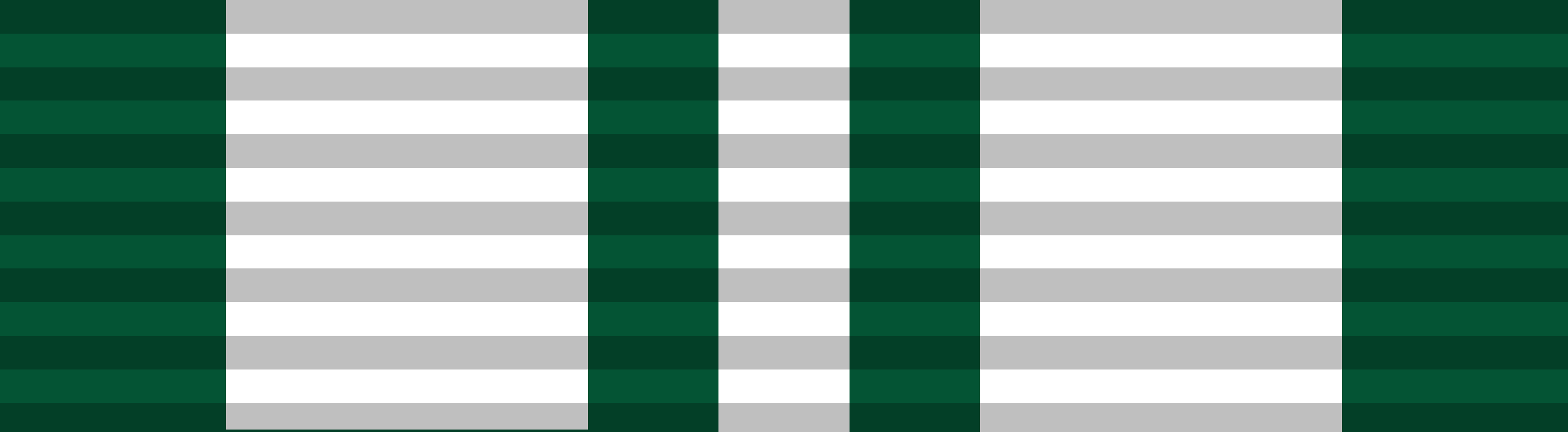
- Awards: Nishan-i-Imtiaz Sitara-e-Pakistan Sitara-i-Imtiaz

Muhammad Shariff (Urdu: محمد شريف ; 22 February 1921 – 6 August 1999) was a Pakistani four-star rank general who served as the first Chairman Joint Chiefs of Staff Committee from 1976 until tendering his resignation in 1977 over the disagreement with the military takeover of the civilian government by the army.

== Biography ==
Muhammad Shariff was born on 22 February 1921 into a Punjabi family in Lahore, Punjab in India. After being educated at the Lawrence College in Murree, Shariff was commissioned in the 3rd infantry battalion of the 2nd Punjab Regiment of the British Indian Army in 1942. 2nd-Lt. Shariff saw actions in the Burma front during World War II with the British Indian Army.

After the partition of India in 1947, Captain Shariff moved to join the newly formed Pakistan Army where his career progressed extremely well, having attended and graduated from the Imperial Defence College. In 1952, Major Shariff was promoted as a lieutenant-colonel and qualified as psc from the Command and Staff College in Quetta; he later achieved promotion to Brigadier in 1959.

In 1960, Brig. Shariff played a crucial role when he commanded the tactical strike brigade to remove the Nawab of Dir and Khan of Jandol to prevent secession from Khyber-Pakhtunkhwa, Pakistan.

In 1964–66, Brig. Shariff moved to the staff assignment at the Army GHQ, serving in the Corps of Education where he served on the army board to select the potential candidates to be educated at the Royal Military Academy Sandhurst. In 1966, Major-General Shariff was appointed as the Inspector General Training and Evaluation (IGT&E) at the Army GHQ, and later appointed as the Commandant of the Command and Staff College in Quetta, which he served until 1970.

In 1970, Maj-Gen. Shariff was promoted to the three-star rank in the army, and took over the diplomatic assignment as opposed to the command assignment. Lieutenant-General Shariff was posted as the permanent representative at the CENTO's HQ in Ankara, Turkey, which he remained until 1971.

On 12 December 1971, Lt-Gen. Shariff returned to Pakistan and partially took over the command of the 33rd Infantry Division, stationed in Quetta, from its GOC, Maj-Gen. Naseer Ahmad, who was wounded in action against the Indian Army. After inspecting the infantry division, Lt-Gen. Shariff eventually handed over the command of the 33rd Infantry Division to then Maj-Gen. Iqbal Khan and departed to Turkey.

In 1972, Lt-Gen. Shariff was appointed as field commander of the II Corps, stationed in Multan. During this time, Lt-Gen. Shariff played a crucial role in his role as a secondment when he led his II Corps to provide the military aid to the civil power to maintain law and order in Karachi, amid the labour unrest. In 1974, Lt-Gen, Shariff was appointed as an honorary Colonel commandant of the Punjab Regiment.

== Chairman Joint Chiefs of Staff Committee ==
Gen. Shariff (second left) along with Gen. Zia (third left) in the passing out parade of the 55th PMA Long Course, 16 April 1977.

In 1976, General Tikka Khan's retirement as a chief of army staff was due, and Lt-Gen. Shariff was the most senior army general in the Pakistani military. Initially, Lt-Gen, Shariff was in the race for the promotion to four-star rank alongside six other army generals.

Eventually, Prime Minister Zulfikar Ali Bhutto promoted and elevated the junior-most Lt-Gen, Zia-ul-Haq, to the four-star appointment and appointed him as nation's second army chief in 1976. Prime Minister Bhutto moved to create the Joint Chiefs of Staff Committee and promoted Lt-Gen. Shariff to the four-star rank, posting him as first Chairman Joint Chiefs of Staff Committee on 1 March 1976.

His relations with Gen. Zia were limited but he seemed to dislike General Zia personally. In 1974–75, Lt-Gen. Shariff had submitted a report to the then-army chief General Tikka Khan that detailed Maj-Gen. Zia's actions of bypassing the chain of command in the military but the report was overshadowed due to Zia's dedication towards promoting the professionalism in the military. His duties as Chairman Joint Chiefs had been largely ineffective, and his deputy Admiral M.S. Khan had led the delegation to meet with Vice Chairman Li Xiannian when he paid a state visit to Pakistan on 22 January 1977.

His relations with Gen. Zia soured and he was not supportive towards the actions by General Zia of military takeover of the civilian government, and regretted that this ultimate step had become inevitable. In July 1977, General Shariff prematurely sought retirement and he submitted his resignation to the President of Pakistan, asking him to relieve him of his duty.

In public circles, General Shariff privately made it clear that the martial law was in fact unconstitutional. Furthermore, General Shariff was of the view of strengthening the Chairman joint chiefs' role to be more assertive and with more power than the army chief, but before the system could evolve itself, the July 1977 coup disturbed the power balance, and tilted it heavily in favor of the army chief.

In 1977, General Shariff left the chairmanship of the joint chiefs to his deputy Admiral Mohammad Shariff but it was not until 1979 when his resignation actually became effective. He died in Lahore on 6 August 1999.

== Awards and decorations ==

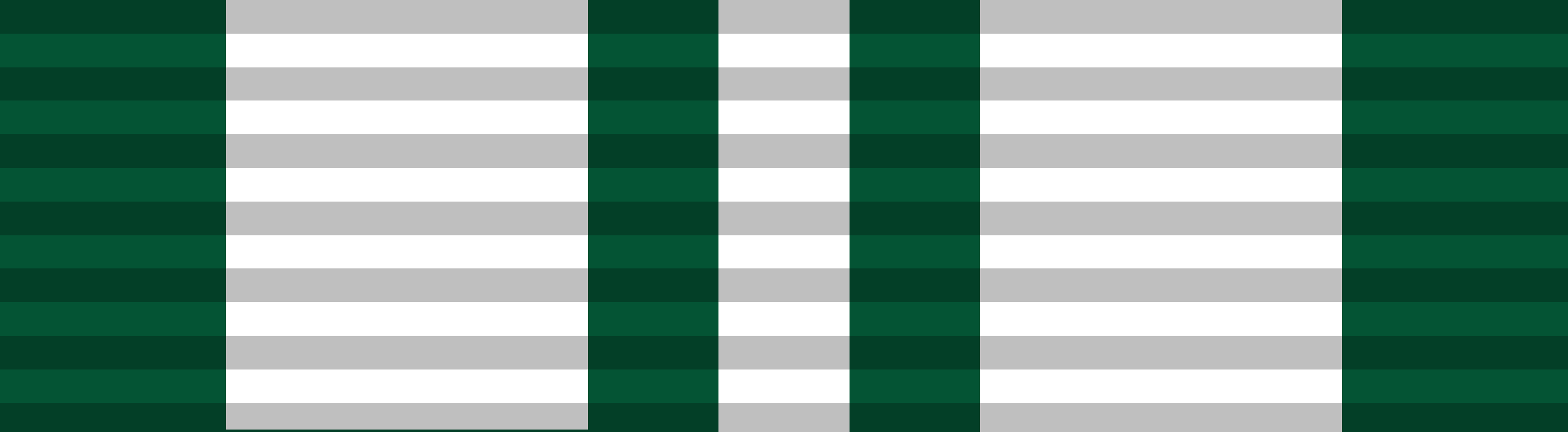

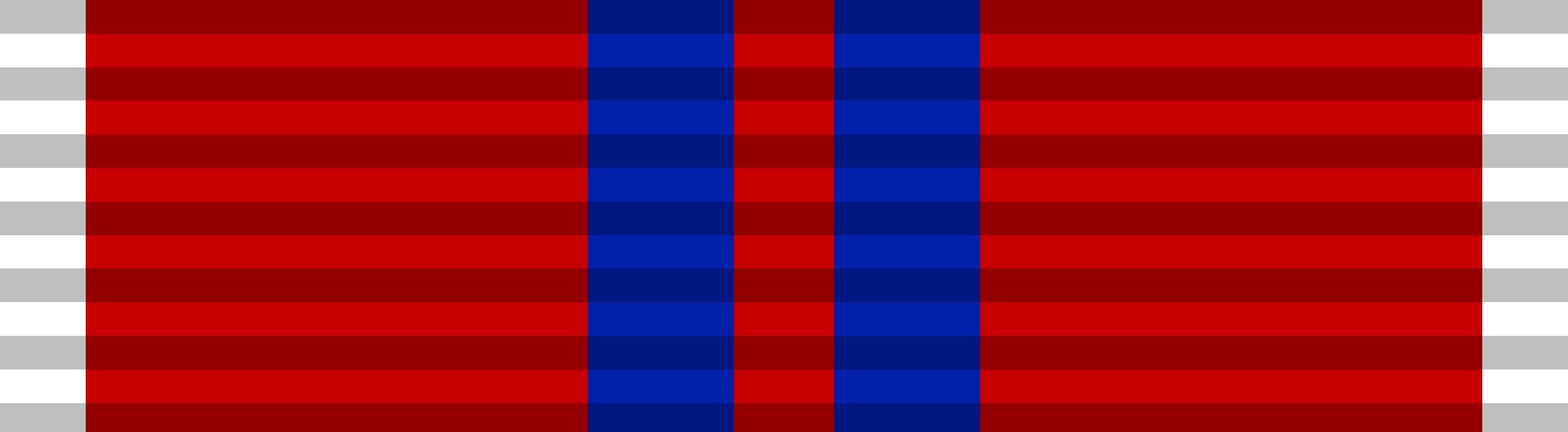

Nishan-e-Imtiaz (Military) (Order of Excellence)		Sitara-e-Pakistan (SPk)	
Sitara-e-Imtiaz (Military) (Star of Excellence)	Tamgha-e-Diffa (General Service Medal) Dir-Bajaur 1960-62 Clasp	Sitara-e-Harb 1965 War (War Star 1965)	Sitara-e-Harb 1971 War (War Star 1965)
Tamgha-e-Jang 1965 War (War Medal 1965)	Tamgha-e-Jang 1971 War (War Medal 1971)	Pakistan Tamgha (Pakistan Medal) 1947	Tamgha-e-Sad Saala Jashan-e- Wiladat-e-Quaid-e-Azam (100th Birth Anniversary of Muhammad Ali Jinnah) 1976
Tamgha-e-Jamhuria (Republic Commemoration Medal) 1956	War Medal 1939-1945	India Service Medal 1939–1945	Queen Elizabeth II Coronation Medal (1953)

=== Foreign decorations ===
Foreign Awards
UK	War Medal 1939-1945
UK	India Service Medal 1939–1945
UK	Queen Elizabeth II Coronation Medal

Military offices
Preceded by Post created	Chairman Joint Chiefs of Staff Committee; 1976 – 1977	Succeeded by Mohammad Shariff
