= Bara Rifles =

Pakistani paramilitary force

- Country: Pakistan
- Branch: Civil Armed Forces
- Size: 6 wings 1 special ops unit
- Part of: Frontier Corps Khyber Pakhtunkhwa (North)

Commanders
- Commandant: Colonel Amir Touseef

The Bara Rifles are a paramilitary regiment forming part of the Frontier Corps Khyber Pakhtunkhwa (North) of Pakistan. The name alludes to the Bara River and Bara Tehsil (a subdivision of Khyber Pakhtunkhwa province). The Rifles are tasked with defending the border with Afghanistan and assisting with law enforcement in the districts adjacent to the border. This includes collaborations with civilian police forces to intercept illegal drug shipments.

== Training ==
The regiment has been involved in training for new Khasadars (a tribal police force in the now defunct Federally Administered Tribal Areas), who are gradually being incorporated into the civilian Khyber Pakhtunkhwa Police.

== Units ==
- Headquarters Wing
- 161 Wing
- 162 Wing
- 163 Wing
- 164 Wing
- 165 Wing
- 166 Wing
- Special Operation Group
