= Pakistan Army Corps of Remount Veterinary and Farms =

Pakistan Army's staff corps for military rations & food

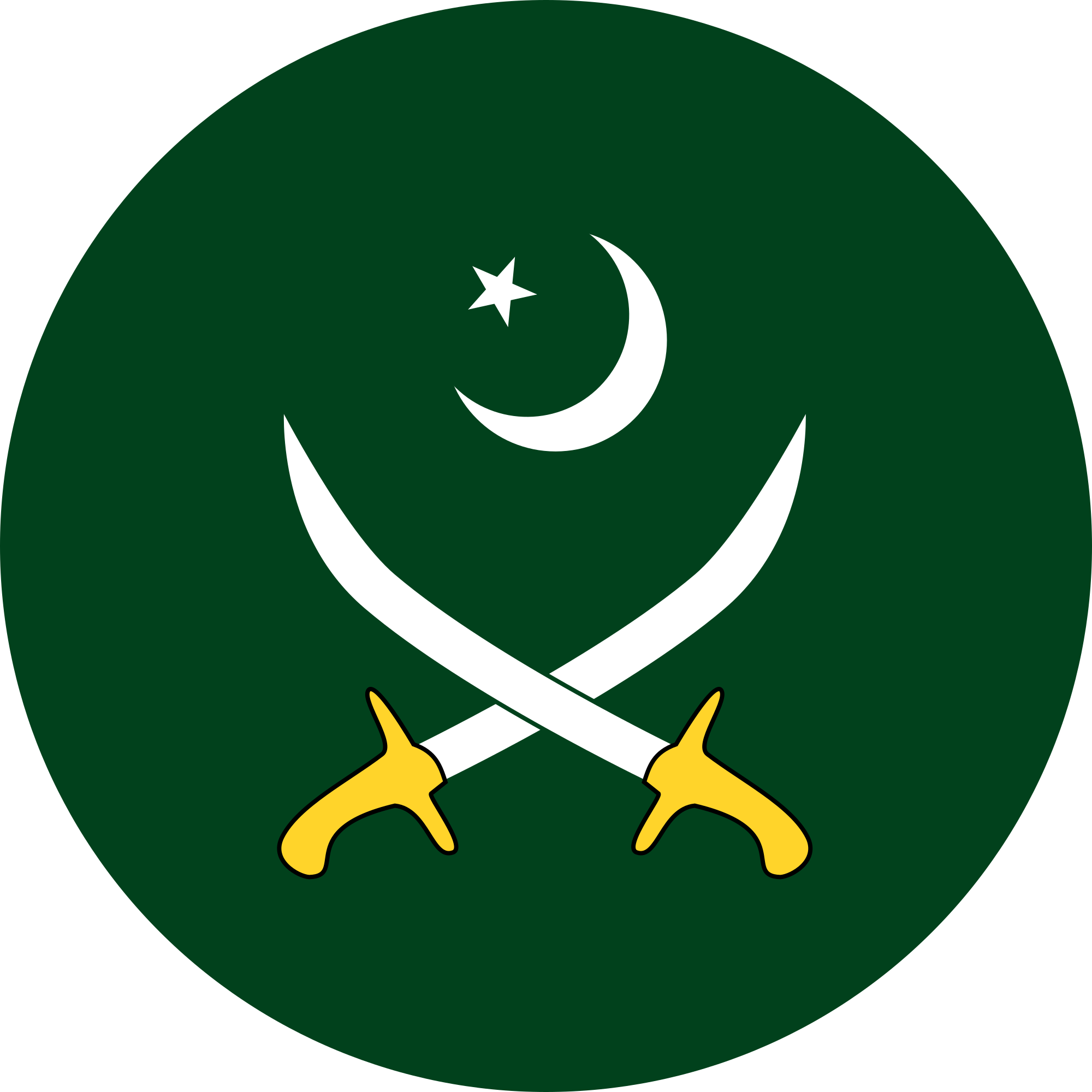
- Badge of Pakistan Army
- Active: 1948; 78 years ago
- Country: Pakistan
- Branch: Pakistan Army
- Type: Combined and combat service support
- Role: Administrative and staffing oversight.
- Size: Varies
- HQ/Garrison: GHQ in Rawalpindi, Punjab, Pakistan
- Nickname: RVF
- Colors Identification: Green, Yellow, and Maroon
- Anniversaries: 1947
- Engagements: Military history of Pakistan
- Decorations: Military Decorations of Pakistan military
- Website: Army Dog Breeding Training Centre and School

Commanders
- Director-General: Maj-Gen. Ahmad Bilal

Insignia
- War Flag

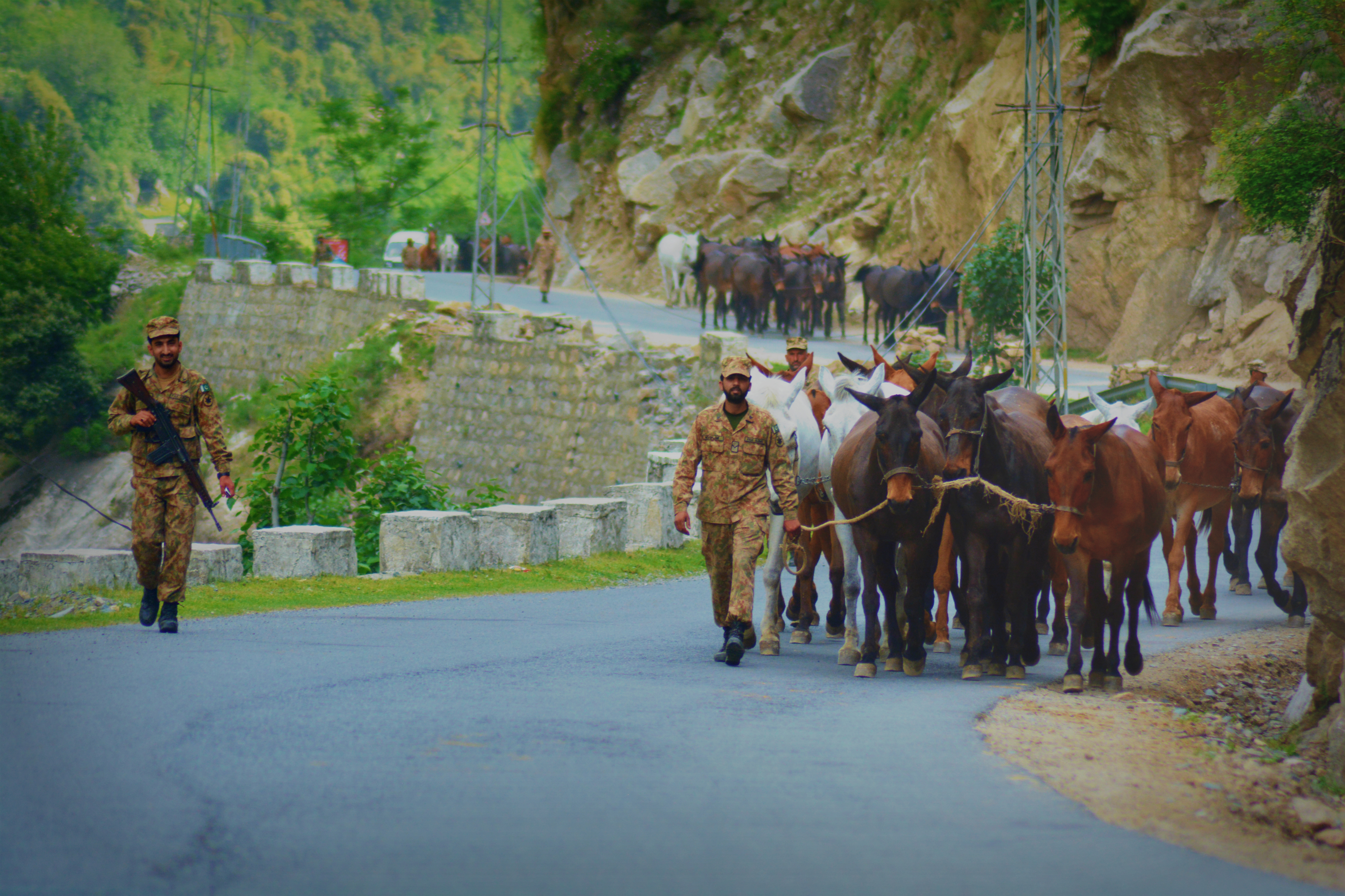
The Pakistan army's troops from RVF Corps mobilizing the livestocks in Kashmir in 2017.

The Pakistan Army Corps of Remount Veterinary and Farms is a military administrative and combat service support staff branch of the Pakistan Army.

The Remount Veterinary and Farms Corps is headquartered in General Headquarters Rawalpindi and is commanded by its director-general, Major General Ahmad Bilal, HI(M) as of October 2026.

== Overview ==
The Pakistan Army Corps of Remount Veterinary and Farms was established from the partition of the Remount Veterinary Corps of the former British Indian Army in 1948 with Major-General Dimond of the British Army becoming its first director. The RVF Corps is responsible for supplying with military rations, dairy products, as well as administrating farms for military.

The education, training, and qualification for its personnel to be part of the RVF Corps is provided by its Army Dog Breeding Training Centre and School (previously known as Army School of Veterinary) in Rawalpindi. Further advance courses on veterinary medicines are provided by the Army College of Veterinary Sciences of National University of Medical Sciences, also in Rawalpindi. The Army Dog Breeding Training Centre and School not only provides training on military canines but also train the RVF Corps officers and enlisted personnel in kennel management and to handle canines in different specialties. The corps also operates the biggest remount facility in the world. The Mona Remount Depot and another depot in Sargodha. Army veterinary school (AVS) is also located in Sargodha.Military farms are spread over all pakistan but the major military farms facility is located in Okara, commonly referred to as Military Farm Group Okara which has experienced controversy with the local farmers in the Okara region. RVFC also has several canine platoons and FD vet sections deployed in KPK and Azad Jammu and Kashmir.

The Corps of Remount Veterinary and Farms is directed by the Director-General at the active-duty senior two-star ranking Major-General who usually works from GHQ, Rawalpindi, Punjab and comes under Quarter master General branch (QMG) at the Army GHQ in Rawalpindi, Punjab in Pakistan.
