= Mahsud Scouts =

Pakistani paramilitary unit

- Founded: 9 August 1937 (87 years, 11 months)
- Country: Pakistan
- Branch: Civil Armed Forces
- Size: 4 wings
- Part of: Frontier Corps Khyber Pakhtunkhwa (North)
- Garrison/HQ: Fort Salop, Bara, Khyber District

Commanders
- Commandant: Colonel Ahmed Madni

The Mahsud Scouts is a paramilitary regiment forming part of the Frontier Corps Khyber Pakhtunkhwa (North) in Pakistan. The name alludes to the Mahsud tribe of South Waziristan. The regiment had a 2020/21 budget of Rs. 1.89 billion and is composed of a headquarters wing with four battalion-sized manoeuvre wings.

== History ==
The regiment was raised in 1937 and were then split into two units: 1st and 2nd Mahsud Scouts. They were also known as the First and Second Mahsud Battalions. The 1st Scouts became the Maiwand Rifles and the 2nd Scouts dropped the number from their name. The Scouts have also been involved in anti-drugs operations. In 2011-2012, the unit received a number of drug testing kits, through a United Nations programme, to assist in their work against drug smuggling.

== Units ==
- Headquarters Wing
- 162 Wing
- 164 Wing
- 165 Wing
- 166 Wing
