= Mohmand Rifles =

Pakistani paramilitary unit

- Founded: 23 November 1973
- Country: Pakistan
- Branch: Civil Armed Forces
- Size: 7 wings
- Part of: Frontier Corps Khyber Pakhtunkhwa (North)
- Regimental centre: Yusuf Khel
- Engagements: Insurgency in Khyber Pakhtunkhwa

The Mohmand Rifles is a paramilitary regiment forming part of the Frontier Corps Khyber Pakhtunkhwa (North) in Pakistan. The name alludes to the Mohmand tribe and the Mohmand Agency. The regiment had a 2020/21 budget of Rs. 2.1 billion and is composed of a headquarters wing with seven battalion-sized manoeuvre wings.

== History ==
The regiment was raised in 1973. It maintained a low profile in its early years with only one incident in 1986, when one of its personnel was killed by firing from Afghanistan. By 1999 it was reported to have 2,330 personnel.

In the 21st century the regiment has been involved in combatting the insurgency in Khyber Pakhtunkhwa. However, it has had some negative consequences. The conduct of the regiment has been the subject of criticism from locals, for example by a tribal assembly in 2005. On 10 June 2008, several members of the regiment were killed at a border checkpoint in the Gora Prai airstrike by the United States military. In December 2008 three of its soldiers were among five dead after a bombing incident in the town of Shabqadar. Nonetheless, by 2010 the regiment claimed to have pushed the militants back and secured control of the majority of the Mohmand Agency.

The Rifles have also long been involved in anti-drug smuggling operations, although not always successfully. In 2011–2012, the unit received a number of drug testing kits, through a United Nations programme, to assist in their work against drug smuggling. many known peoples have served in mohmand rifles(khasadar) but one of the most respected officers to serve in the region was Major Raees Khan, who joined the tribal militia in 1984–1985 and retired in 2009. Born in 1948 in Lower Mohmand, he played a significant role in maintaining law and order, resisting TTP infiltration, curbing opium smuggling, and controlling cross-border movement along the Afghan frontier. His efforts in capturing criminals and preserving tribal peace earned him lasting recognition across Mohmand, where he is still remembered with deep respect.

== Role in Operation Brekhna ==
The Mohmand Rifles played a pivotal role in the counter-insurgency operation codenamed as Operation Brekhna. The operation was part of larger campaign of Pakistan Armed Forces to flush out militants from North-West regions of Pakistan. The operation was meant to free Mohmand Agency from the clutches of Tehreek-e-Taliban Pakistan and its allies who had held swath of territories of Mohmand since 2004 to 2009. Besides, Mohmand had also served as a sanctuary for the militants of Al-Qaeda and Afghan Taliban who turned Mohmand Agency into a safe haven after fleeing US onslaught in Afghanistan in an aftermath of US invasion of Afghanistan. Mohmand Rifles hunted various Islamist militants belonging to different terrorist entities as part of Pakistan's commitment against global war on terrorism as a key Non-NATO ally of USA and as part of Pakistan's war on terror. Mohmand Rifles with support from the Pakistan Army was able to recapture lost territories till 2012 by engaging in a bloody campaign against TTP and its Islamist allies.

== Role ==
The Mohmand Rifles serves as the first line of defence as militia is responsible for the border patrols of Mohmand portion of Afghanistan-Pakistan border that cuts through Mohmand District on Pakistani side whereas Kunar province on Afghanistan side. Additionally, the Mohmand Rifles provides security to the key installations located across the Mohmand such as tunnels, dams, and military installations, such as Mohmand Dam and Nahqi Tunnel. Since the US invasion of Afghanistan in 2001, the Mohmand Rifles has played a frontline role against terrorism. The force also assists local Law Enforcement Agencies in the maintenance of law and order across the region.

Some of the following are primary responsibilities of the Rifles:-

- Border Patrolling.
- Assist Army/FCNA in the defense of the country as and when required.
- Protect important communication centers and routes.
- Undertake counter militancy/criminal/terrorism operations on orders.
- Assist law enforcement agencies in maintenance of law and order.
- Safeguard important sites and assets

During times of extraordinary law and order crises, the government occasionally grants power to the Mohmand Rifles to arrest and detain a criminals.

== Units ==
- Headquarters Wing
- 201 Wing
- 202 Wing
- 203 Wing
- 204 Wing
- 205 Wing
- 206 Wing
- 207 Wing

== See also ==
- Gora Prai airstrike
