= Pakistan Armed Forces Nursing Service =

Pakistan Army's joint staff corps for nursing

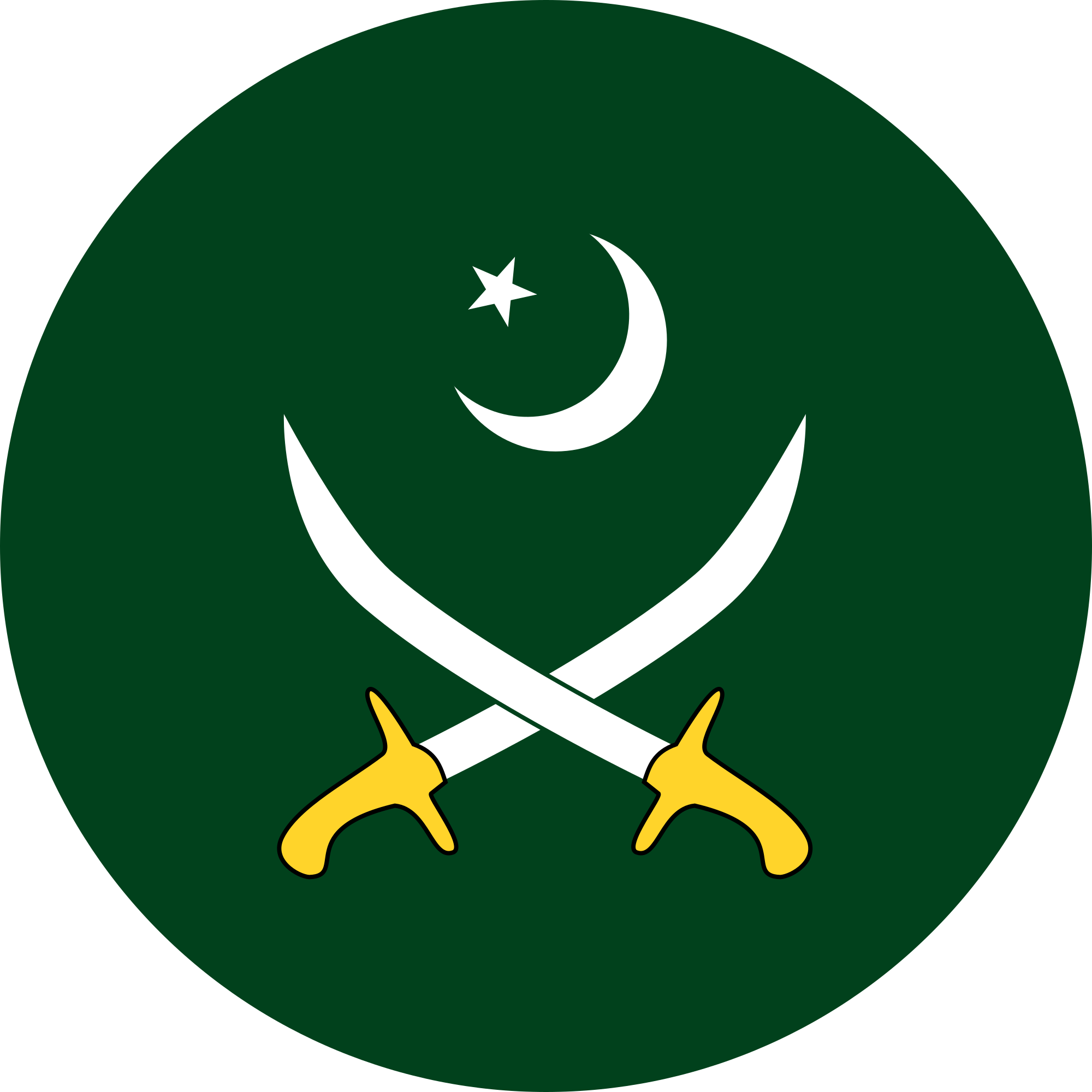
- Badge of Pakistan Army
- Active: 1952; 74 years ago
- Country: Pakistan
- Branch: Pakistan Army: Pakistan Navy; Pakistan Air Force; Pakistan Marines
- Type: Combined and combat service support
- Role: Administrative and staffing oversight.
- Size: Varies
- HQ/Garrison: Army GHQ in Rawalpindi, Punjab, Pakistan
- Nickname: NUR
- Colors Identification: Green and White
- Anniversaries: 1952
- Engagements: Military history of Pakistan
- Decorations: Military Decorations of Pakistan military

Commanders
- Director-General: Maj-Gen. Shazia Nisar

Insignia
- War Flag

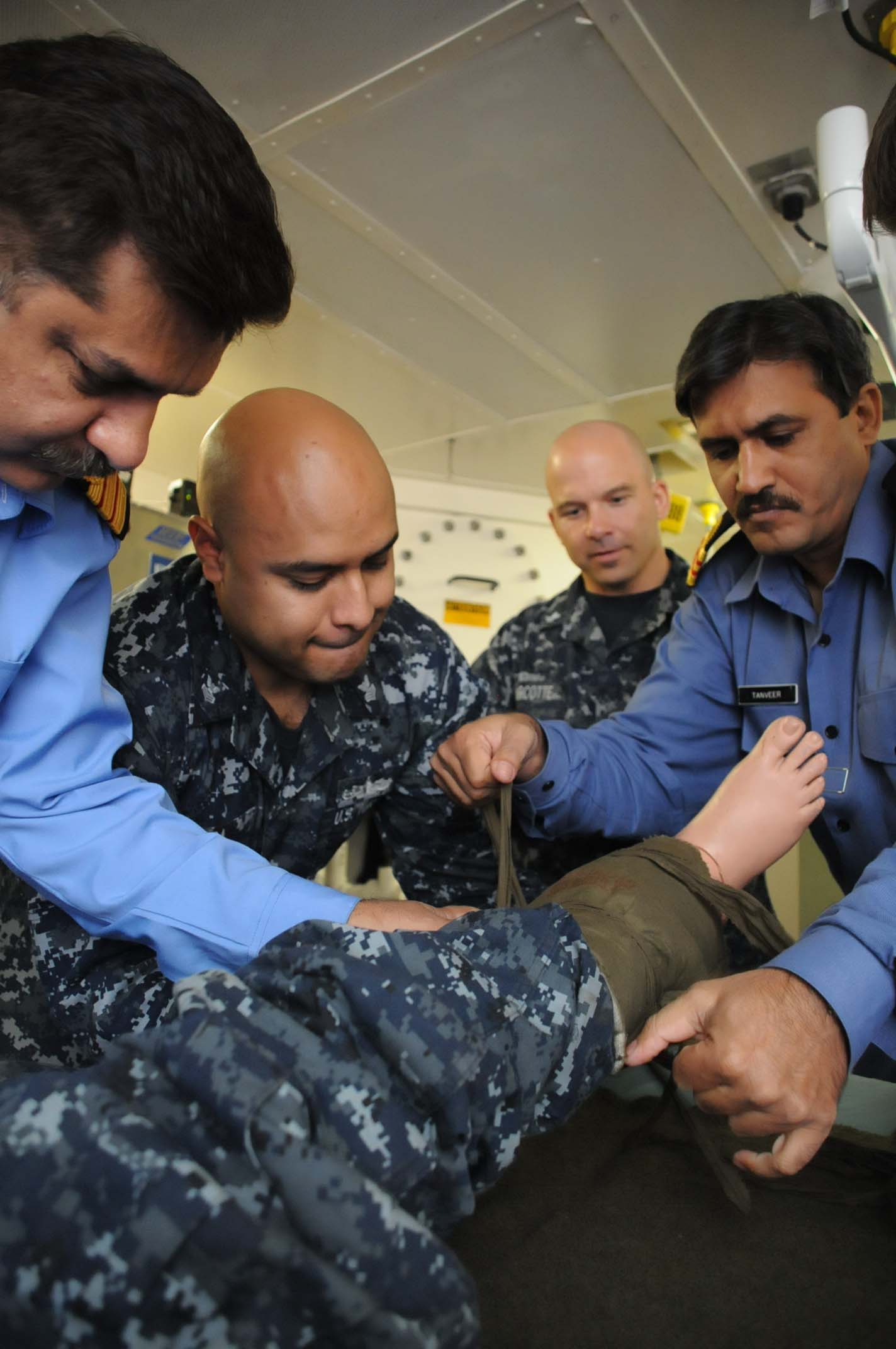
The Pakistan Navy's nurses providing mock-up health services in 2010.

The Pakistan Armed Forces Nursing Service is a joint military administrative and staff service branch of the Pakistan Armed Forces— since it is not restricted to the army but service members of other branches of the Pakistan's military are also its part.

== Overview ==
The staff branch was established by the British Royal Navy's Queen Alexandra's Royal Naval Nursing Service at the request of Pakistan Army Medical Corps in 1952— its first director was Colonel C. P. Maudsley from the British Army, which he served till 1964. The Nursing Service is all female military unit according to the constitution of Pakistan.

In 1964, the Nursing Service saw its first officer Col. Fatima Qureshi as its director. The qualifications, training, and professional certifications in nursing, and personnel support for Nursing Service is provided by the Armed Forces Post Graduate Medical Institute in Rawalpindi since 1959.

The Nursing Service is not restricted to the army but service members of other branches of the Pakistan's military are also its part– though the leadership comes from the army.
