= Ministry of Defence (Pakistan) =

Government ministry of Pakistan

- وزارت دفاع
- State emblem of Pakistan

Agency overview
- Formed: 14 August 1947; 78 years ago
- Jurisdiction: Government of Pakistan
- Headquarters: Pakistan Secretariat No. II in Adam Jee Road, Rawalpindi-46000, Punjab, Pakistan.
- Annual budget: US$17.8 billion (2024)
- Minister responsible: Khawaja Asif, Minister of Defence
- Agency executives: Lt Gen (R) Muhammad Ali, Secretary of Defence; Ali Zahid Khan, Parliamentary Secretary for Defence
- Website: www.mod.gov.pk

The Ministry of Defence (Urdu: وزارت دفاع, romanized: vizārat-e-difā', abbreviated as MoD) is a ministry of the federal Government of Pakistan, tasked in defending national interests and territorial integrity of Pakistan. The MoD oversees mission execution of its policies and supervises all agencies of the government directly related to the national security and the Pakistan Armed Forces.

The existence and functions of the ministry are statutorily defined in Part XII, Chapter II of the Constitution of Pakistan with Minister of Defence being its head who reports directly to Prime Minister of Pakistan.

The responsibilities for procurement, production and disposal of equipment were transferred in 2004 to the Ministry of Defence Production. The Ministry of Defence is one of the largest federal ministries of the Government of Pakistan in terms of budget as well as staff.

== History ==
The Ministry of Defence (Urdu: وزارت دفاع; Transliteration: Wazarat-e-Difa) was created on 14 August 1947 from the partitioning of Ministry of Defence of India, with Prime Minister of Pakistan Liaquat Ali Khan taking the additional charge as first Minister of Defence.

From 1947 until 1971, the MoD was highly centralised with decision-making process and defence policies was solely depended on the General Headquarters (Pakistan Army) in Rawalpindi, Punjab. In 1973, the Constitution of Pakistan provided the legal existence and its concise functionary role in defined Part XII, Chapter II, which strongly supported the civilian control of the military to prevent any misadventures affecting the national integrity of Pakistan.

Since 1973, many reforms have been carried out to strengthened the role of the ministry and execute its mission and scopes. From 1947 until 2004, the MoD also oversaw the roles of military expenditures and procurement when the Ministry of Defence Production was created. Unlike the other federal ministries, the MoD is still based in Rawalpindi, near the vicinity of GHQ and the JS HQ.

In its current mission parameters, the MoD is works to execute the defence policy and coordinates its functions among the different agencies and contractors relating to defence. The MoD also grants security clearances under British-styled Official Secrets Act to those involved in programs related to national security.

== Organizational structure ==
The Minister of Defence, appointed by the Prime Minister of Pakistan, is an elected member of Parliament of Pakistan who is a head of the ministry per accordance to the Constitution. The Defence minister is assisted by the Secretary of Defence and Parliamentary Secretary of Defence to oversee the bureaucratic matters and issues relating to administering the civil affairs between the military and the Prime Minister's Secretariat in Islamabad.

The Ministry of Defence is composed of Secretariats of Army, Air Force, and Navy, the Joint Chiefs of Staff Committee, tri-services headquarters (GHQ, AHQ and NHQ), secretary from finance ministry for military financing, and joint secretaries from each secretariats of army, air force, and navy. The following is a simplified representation of the MoD's senior leadership:

Military Secretariats of the Ministry of Defence

Joint Chiefs of Staff Committee

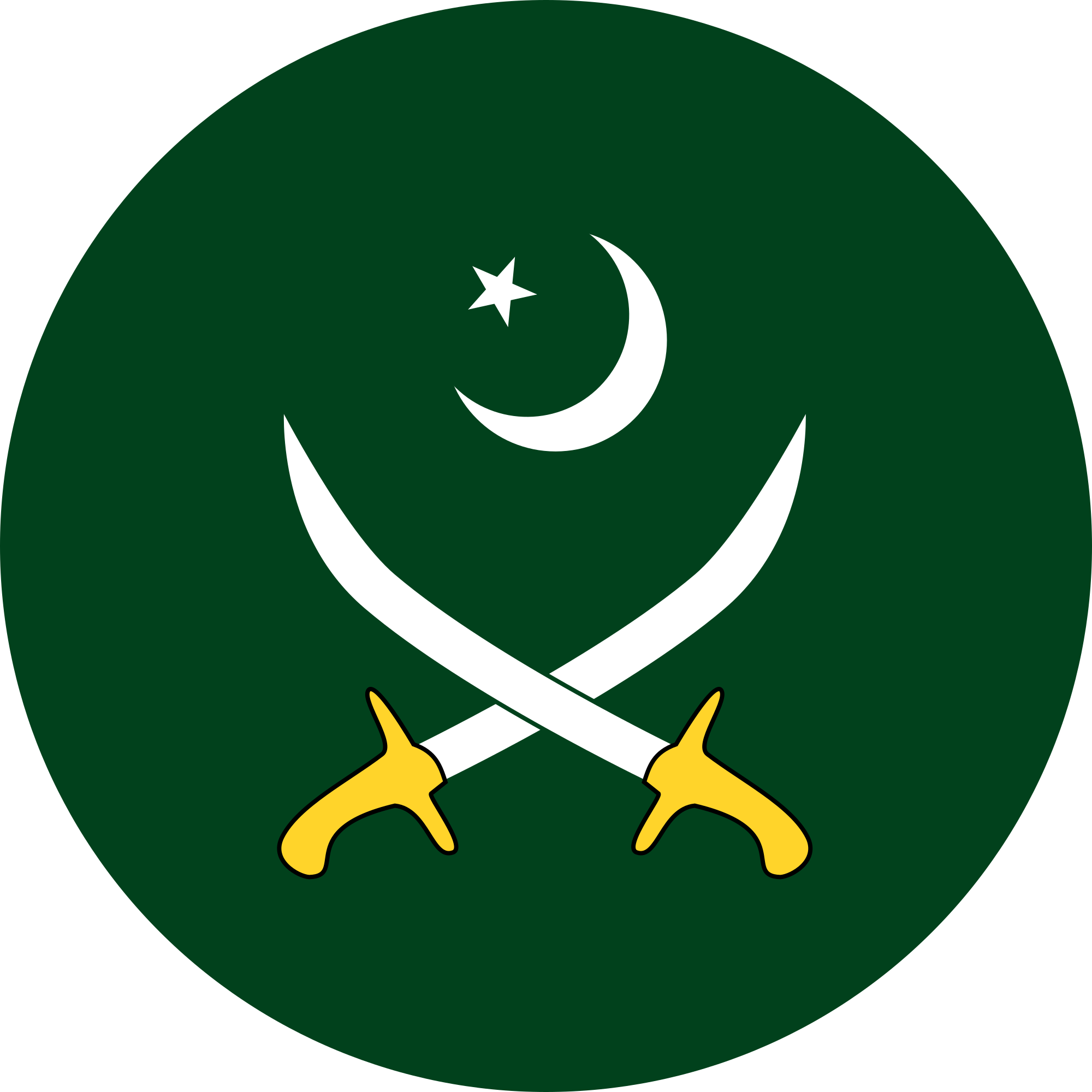
Secretariat-I Army

Secretariat-II Air Force

Secretariat-III Navy
Attached formations of the Ministry of Defence

Joint Staff Headquarters

Pakistan Army

Pakistan Navy

Pakistan Air Force

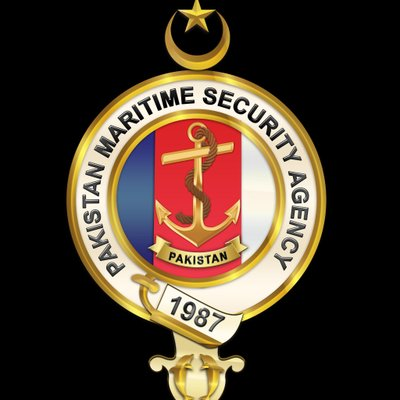
Maritime Security Agency

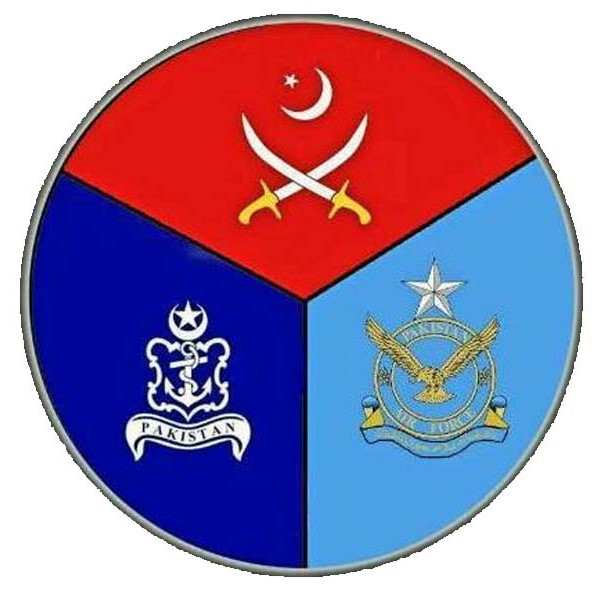
Military Lands and Cantonments Department

=== Restructuring ===
In the past, the Aviation Division (established in 2013) and Ministry of Defence Production (established in 2004) were also part of the MoD. The Special Communications Organization was also part of the MoD when it was separated and attached to the Ministry of Telecommunication in 1976. Prior to the establishment of the National Command Authority (NCA) in 2000, the Ministry of Defence (MoD) was responsible for the security and development of Pakistan's nuclear weapons, including oversight of the weapons testing laboratories.

The Ministry of Defence (MoD) does not have direct control over several uniformed paramilitary organizations in Pakistan, despite the appointment of their leadership often coming from Pakistan Army. These organizations, including the Pakistan Rangers, Frontier Corps, Coast Guards and Gilgit-Baltistan Scouts, fall under the administrative control of the Ministry of Interior (MoI).

== See also ==
- Ministry of the Interior
- Ministry of Defence Production
- National Command Authority
