= General Headquarters (Pakistan Army) =

Direct reporting post of the Pakistan Army

General Headquarters
- Part of Joint Staff Headquarters
- Chaklala, Rawalpindi, Punjab in Pakistan

Site information
- Type: HQ
- Owner: Ministry of Defense (MoD)
- Operator: Secretariat-I Army
- Controlled by: Chief of the General Staff

Location
- Location within Punjab, Pakistan Location within Pakistan
- Coordinates: 33°35′11.7″N 73°02′56.7″E

Site history
- Built: 1851; 175 years ago (By British Indian Army)
- Built for: National Army HQ of Pakistan Armed Forces
- Built by: Corps of Engineers (Construction and expansion since 1947)

Garrison information
- Current commander: Lt.Gen Omer Ahmed Bokhari
- Designations: Army GHQ

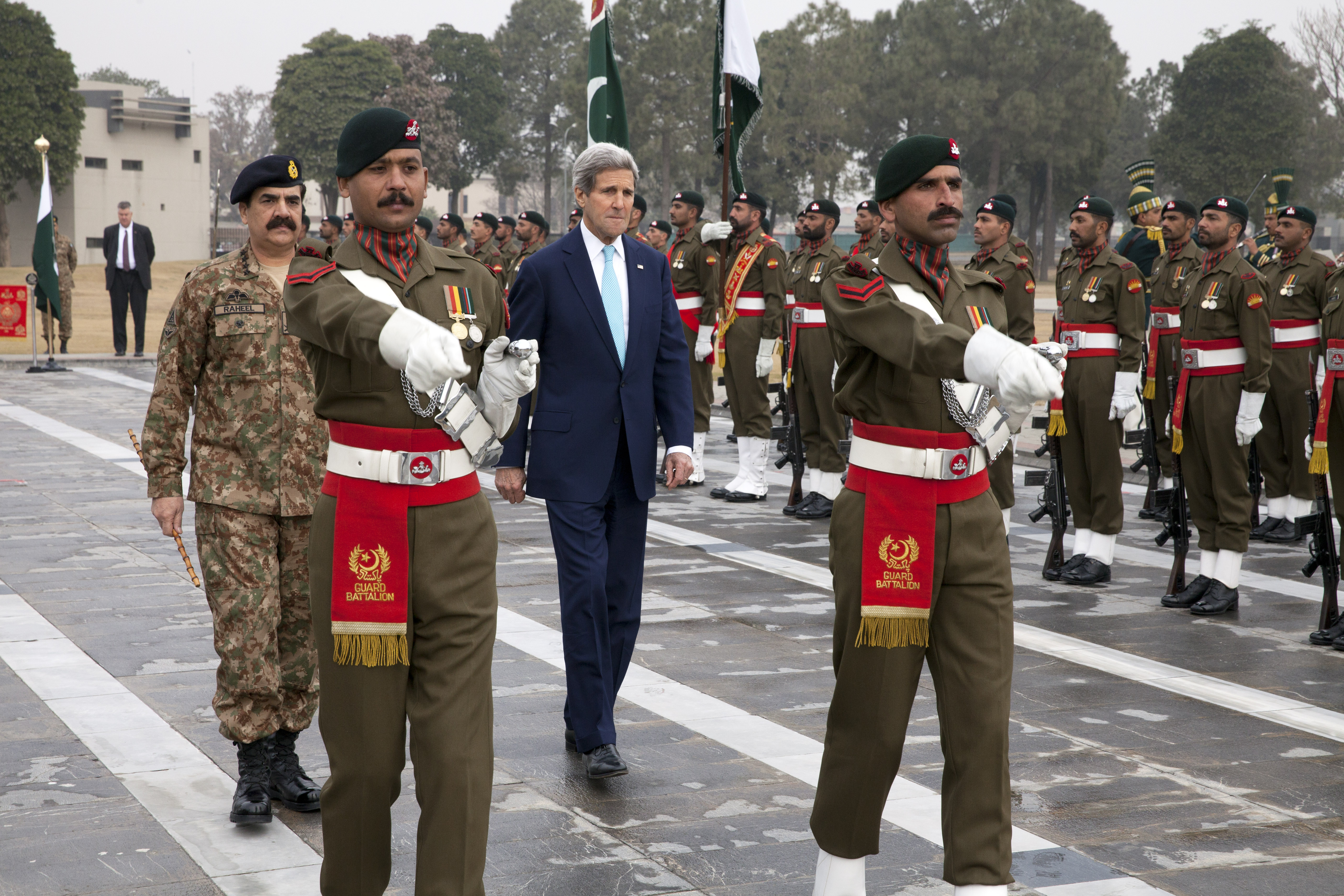
John Kerry, then-Secretary of State, at the pavilion of the Army GHQ in 2015.

The General Headquarters (abbreviated Army GHQ) is the direct reporting and the command post of the Pakistan Army, located in the Chaklala at the vicinity of Rawalpindi, adjacent to the Joint Staff Headquarters (JS HQ).

== History ==
In 1851, the British Army in India made a permanent headquarter in Rawalpindi when James Broun-Ramsay, 1st Marquess of Dalhousie decided to stationed the 53rd Infantry Regiment to protect India from Afghan intervention. In 1854, Robert Milman from the Diocese of Calcutta had built the city's first Garrison Church and a telegraph office. It is also the site where Robert Milman is buried following his death in Rawalpindi in 1876.

On 14 August 1947, Commander-in-Chief of the Pakistan Army General Frank Messervy decided to establish the army headquarters of the Pakistan Army at the Rawalpindi, which was also the headquarter of the Northern Command of the former British Indian Army; Gen. Messervy established it as "GHQ Pakistan", which he derived from GHQ India. The Army's GHQ was viewed as a temporary post in Rawalpindi since its where Gen. Messervy was based in. Since its establishment, the Army GHQ in Rawalpindi has faced many problems in civil–military relations context and criticism at broader level since the nation's capital was based in Karachi in past, and now in Islamabad. Until 2006, the Army GHQ's command post was based in Rawalpindi but later moved to Chaklala, near the vicinities of the PAF Base Chaklala and the JS HQ military headquarters.

Since 2017, the Pakistan Army has been slowly moving its headquarters to nation's capital, Islamabad to be able to merge with the air force and the navy.

== Gates ==
Gates	Purpose	Road
Gate No 1	General	
Gate No 2	Exclusively reserved for service/ex-service personnels	
Gate No 3	Exclusively reserved for families/families of martyrs	
Gate No 4	Exclusively reserved for politicians/bureaucrats	
Gate No 5	Exclusively reserved for foreign dignatries	
Gate No 6	Exclusively reserved for patients visiting CMH/Army Museum	
Gate No 7	General	

== Secretariat ==
The Pakistan Army's GHQ is a command post of the Pakistan Army where the secretariat of the Chief of the Army Staff functions to ensure the ceremonial and operational command of the army.

There are ten branches of the Pakistan Army that are headed by the lieutenant-generals and multiple administrative corps that are commanded by the director-generals who are ranked at the major-general. Each of the army's branches and the director-generals of the administrative corps works under the Chief of the General Staff (CGS). The chief of general staff, who usually heads the Army GHQ Staff, reports directly to chief of army staff on daily routine basis.

=== Branches of the Pakistan Army ===
There are ten branches of the Pakistan Army that are headed by the lieutenant-generals and multiple administrative corps that are commanded by the director-generals who are ranked at the major-general.

The Chief of Army Staff Secretariat is not considered as a part of the army branch but functions separately as an office of the chief of army staff.

- Branches at the Army GHQ (Source: More citations needed)
  - Chief of Army Staff Secretariat (COAS Secy.)
    - Personal Secretary COAS
    - Director-General Staff Duties
    - Director-General Perspective Planning Cell
  - General Staff Branch (GS Brnch.)
    - Vice-CGS(A)
    - Vice-CGS(B)
    - DG Military Operations
    - DG Military Intelligence
    - DG Inspection and Technical Development
    - DG Organization and Methods
    - DG Defense Security Force
    - DG Weapons and Equipment
  - Logistics Branch (Log. Brnch.)
    - Vice-CLS(A)
    - Vice-CLS(B)
    - DG of Logistics
    - DG of National Logistics Corporation
    - Commandant Army Service Corps
    - Dte. of Budget and Banking
    - Commandant Corps of EME
    - DG of Aviation Corps
    - MGO of Ordnance Corps
    - DG of Supply & Transport
    - DG of Aviation Fleet Management (DG-AFM)
  - Arms Branch (Arms Brnch.)
    - DG Infantry Brnch.
    - DG Armored Corps
    - DG Artillery
    - DG Air Defence Corps
    - DG Engineers
    - DG Army Aviation Corps
    - Dy. DG Arms
  - Adjutant‑General Branch (AG Brnch.)
    - JAG Brnch.
    - Welfare and Rehabilitation
    - Military Accounts Brnch.
    - Dte. Housing
    - Dte. Personal Service
    - Provost Marshal-General of MP
    - DG of Army National Guards
    - DG of Strategic Projects
    - Comptroller-General of Civilians
    - Dte. Procurement-Army (P-A)
    - Dte. Personal Administration (PA)
  - Military Secretary Branch (MS Brnch.)
    - Military Secretary
  - Training and Evaluation Branch (T&E Brnch.)
    - Dte. of Human Resource Development
    - DG of Corps of Education
    - Pres. of National Defence University
    - Cmdt. of Military Academy
    - DG of Institute of Military History
    - Cmdt. of Command and Staff College
    - DG of Physical fitness and Sports
    - DG of Band
    - DG Federal Government Educational Institutes
  - Quartermaster‑General Branch (QMG Brnch.)
    - Deputy Quartermaster-General
    - DG of Cantonments
    - DG of Military Lands and Cantonments
    - DG of Corps of Remount Veterinary and Farms
    - Pres. of Welfare Trust
  - Engineer-in-Chief Branch (E-in-C Brnch.)
    - DG of Frontier Works Organization
    - Military Engineering Service
    - Corps of Engineers
    - Corps of Electrical and Mechanical Engineering
    - Surveyor-General of Mapping Services
    - DG Works & Chief Engineer Army (DG CE-A)
  - Communication and Information Technology Branch (C&IT Brnch.)
    - Deputy Inspector General Communication & IT
    - Signal Officer in Chief
    - DG of Corps of Signals
    - Dte. of Command, Control, Communication, Computer and Intelligence
    - Dte. of Cyber Operations
    - DG of Special Communications Organization
  - Surgeon‑General Branch (SG Brnch.)
    - Deputy Surgeon General
    - Medical Corps
    - DG Medicine
    - DG Surgery
    - DG of Nursing Corps
    - IG of Combined Military Hospitals
    - DG of Medical Services (Inter-Services)
    - DG of Medical Services, Azad Kashmir
    - DG of Medical Services, (Navy)
    - Principal Army Medical College (AMC)

== Security ==
=== Incidents and Breaches ===
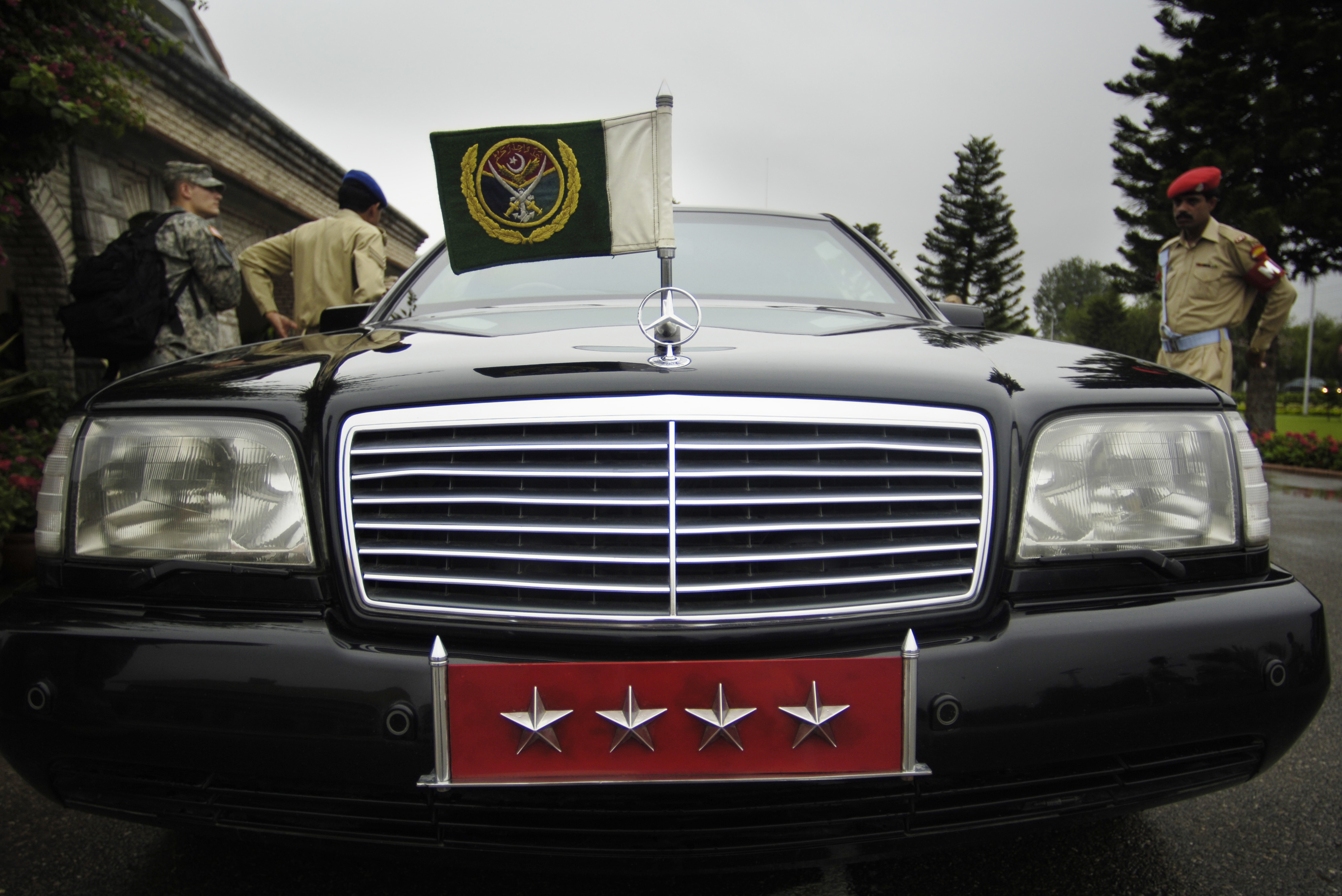
The Military Police (red beret and white belt) guarding the official vehicle used by Gen. Pervez Musharraf

In 1970s, the Army's GHQ became a focal point of massive arrests and incidents of military police's baton charge on protestors when politicians Sheikh Mujibur Rahman (in 1970) and Zulfikar Ali Bhutto (in 1977) were taken into custody.

The Pakistani Taliban have repeatedly attacked the headquarters. The first attack took place in 2007. Others followed in 2008, resulting in Operation Janbaz, the December 2009 Rawalpindi attack; and the 2014 Rawalpindi suicide bombing.

On 9 May 2023, the Army GHQ along with 40 administration buildings were attacked and vandalized after the National Accountability Bureau agents and Rangers were sent to deliver the arrest warrants to former Prime Minister Imran Khan during his appearance in Islamabad High Court.

=== Relocation efforts ===
To prevent the Taliban's repeated infiltration and to address the issue of increase security, the headquarters, together with Joint Staff Headquarters, has been slowly moving to Islamabad to integrate with the navy and air force's headquarters that are located in much safer zones of Islamabad, since 2017.

== See also ==
- Joint Staff Headquarters (Pakistan)
- Air Headquarters (Pakistan)
- Naval Headquarters (Pakistan)
- Pakistan Armed Forces
- Operation Janbaz
