= Infantry Branch (Pakistan Army) =

Pakistan Army Infantry Branch
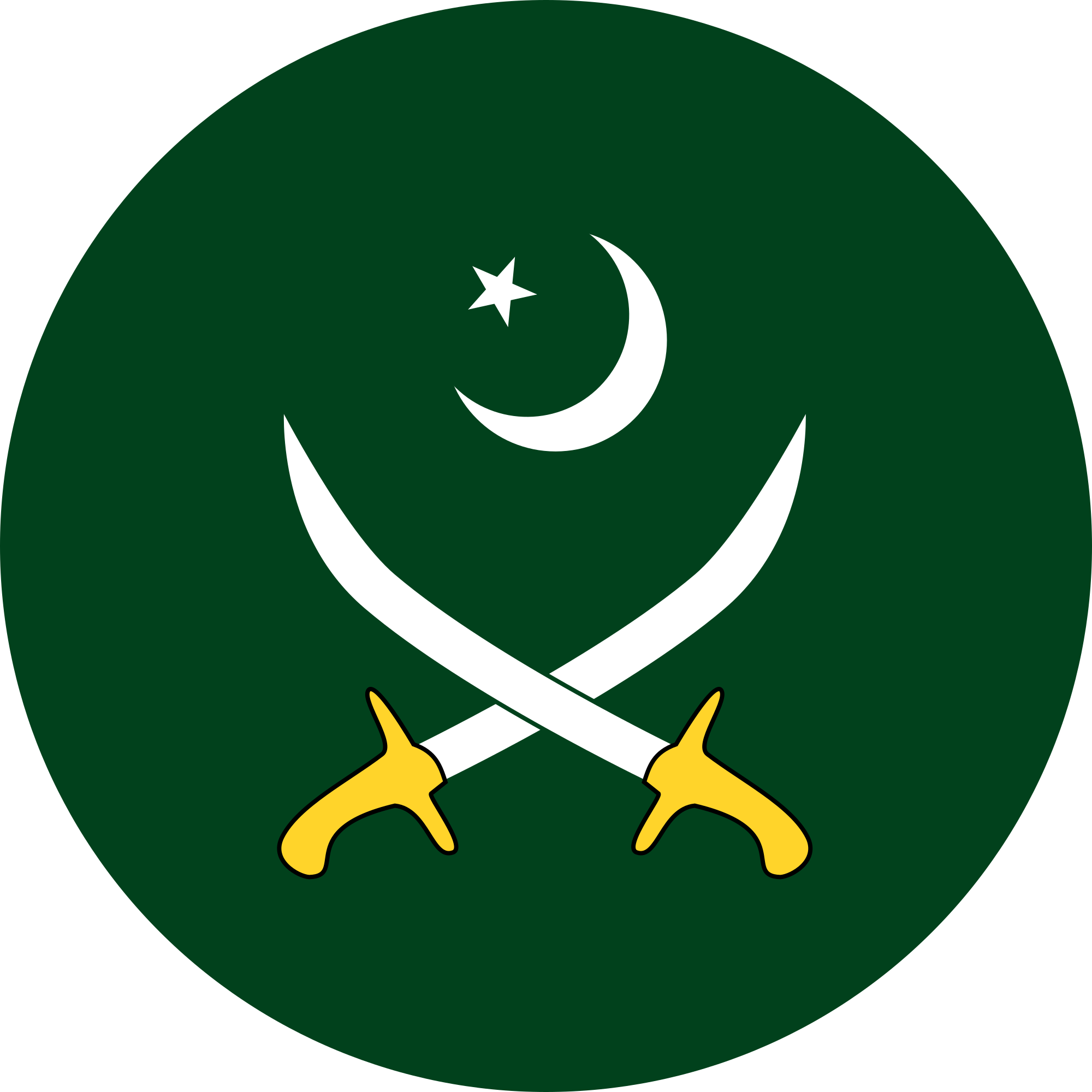
- Badge of the Pakistan Army
- Founded: 1947; 79 years ago
- Country: Pakistan
- Branch: Pakistan Army
- Type: Combined arms
- Role: Administrative and staffing oversight.
- Size: 6 Infantries
- HQ/Garrison: Army GHQ in Rawalpindi, Punjab in Pakistan.
- Nickname: INF
- Colors identification
- Engagements: Military history of Pakistan
- Website: Pakistan Army − Infantry

Commanders
- Director-General: Maj-Gen. Dr. Ehsan Mehmood
- Notable commanders: Gen. Abdul Hamid Khan; Maj-Gen. Iftikhar' Khan

Insignia
- War Flag

The Pakistan Army Infantry Branch is a military administrative and combined arms branch of the Pakistan Army.

The Infantry Branch of Pakistan Army is an administrative set up with its director-general, Major-General Ehsan Mahmood as of 2022.

== Overview ==
The Infantry Branch of the Pakistan Army was established from the partition of the former British Indian Army's Infantry in 1947– only five regiments were part of the Infantry. The Infantry Branch is in fact an administrative military organization that is not combat field formation, and it oversees the practice, training, rotation, and deployments including assisting the federal government in civic administration.

The Infantry Branch's personnel education, support and training is provided by the School of Infantry and Tactics. The Infantry Branch is commanded by its director-general– a two-star rank major-general– who works under the Chief of the General Staff at the Army GHQ in Rawalpindi, Punjab in Pakistan.

== Structure ==
Pakistan Army has 7 Infantry Regiments. The units under these regiments are deployed throughout the Pakistan. The regiments are -

- Azad Kashmir Regiment
- Baloch Regiment
- Northern Light Infantry Regiment
- Frontier Force Regiment
- Sindh Regiment
- Punjab Regiment
- Mujahid Force Regiment
