= Structure of the Pakistan Army =

The structure of the Pakistan Army is based on two distinct themes: operational and administrative. Operationally the Pakistan Army is divided into nine corps and three corps-level formations with areas of responsibility (AOR) ranging from the mountainous regions of the north to the desert and coastal regions of the south. Administratively it is divided in several regiments (details below). The General Headquarters (GHQ) of the Army is located in Rawalpindi in Punjab province.

== Army headquarters and staff ==
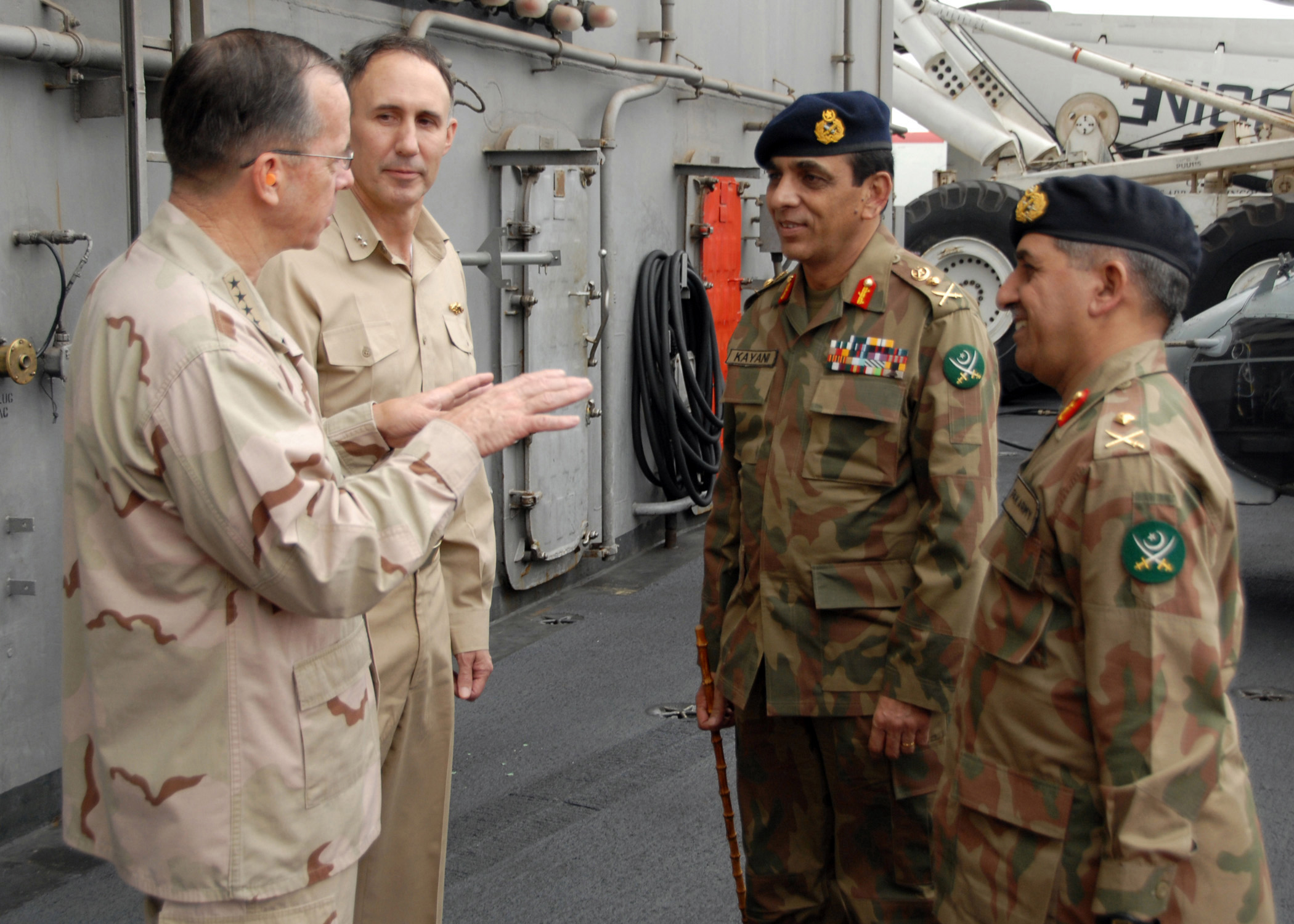
From left, Chairman of the Joint Chiefs of Staff Navy Adm. Mike Mullen and Rear Adm. Scott Van Buskirk, commander of Carrier Strike Group 9, speak with Chief of Army Staff Gen. Ashfaq Kayani and Maj. Gen. Ahmad Shuja Pasha, director general of military operations, on the flight deck of the aircraft carrier USS Abraham Lincoln (CVN-72) while under way in the northern part of the Arabian Sea on Aug. 27, 2008.

The Chief of the Army Staff (COAS), formerly called the Commander-in-Chief (C-in-C of the Pakistan Army), is challenged with the responsibility of commanding the Pakistan Army. The COAS operates from army headquarters in Rawalpindi, near Islamabad. The Principal Staff Officers (PSO's) assisting him in his duties at the lieutenant general level include:

Post	Name
Chief of the Army Staff (COAS) concurrently Chief of Defence Forces (CDF)	Field Marshal Syed Asim Munir Ahmed Shah
Chief of the General Staff (CGS)	Lieutenant General Syed Aamer Raza
Chief of Logistics Staff (CLS)	Lieutenant General Inayat Hussain
Inspector General Arms (IG Arms)	Lieutenant General Sarfraz Ahmed
Adjutant General (AG)	Lieutenant General Azhar Waqas
Quarter Master General (QMG)	Lieutenant General Hassan Khattak
Military Secretary (MS)	Lieutenant General Amer Ahsan Nawaz
Master-General of Ordnance (MGO)	TBA
Inspector General Training & Evaluation (IG T&E)	Lieutenant General Aamer Najam
Inspector General Communications and Information Technology (IG C&IT)	Lieutenant General Muhammad Aqeel
Engineer-in-Chief (E-in-C)	Lieutenant General Kashif Nazir

The Military Operations and Intelligence Directorates function under the Chief of General Staff (CGS). A major reorganization in GHQ was done in September 2008 under General Ashfaq Parvez Kayani, when two new PSO positions were introduced: the Inspector General Arms and the Inspector General Communications and IT, thus raising the number of PSO's to eight.

The headquarters function also includes the Judge Advocate General (JAG), and the Controller of Civilian Personnel, the Chief of the Corps of Engineers (E-in-C) who is also head of Military Engineering Service (MES), all of them also report to the Chief of the Army Staff.

== Operational structure ==
=== Hierarchy ===
Order	Organization		Typical Commander	(NATO) OFC-Star
1.	Chief of Army Staff	This post is held by the senior most and an experienced army officer, although the Chief of Army doesn't directly command but it has significant importance, the role of Chief of Army is to ensure the command of the whole of national army that includes: Overseeing the army: The army chief is responsible for overseeing all aspects of the army, including training, discipline, equipment, and readiness.; Acting on orders: The army chief must carry out the orders of the Prime Minister or President, and may be responsible for implementing military action as directed.; Advising the government: The army chief provides advice to the government on matters of national security, and may be called upon to provide advice to the Prime Minister or President.	General	
2.	Corps	A corps usually comprises two or more divisions.	Lieutenant General	
3.	Division	A division usually comprises three brigades including infantry, artillery, and engineers. Each division also has one or more armoured brigades, except mountain divisions. There are nineteen Infantry divisions, one Special Security Division, two mechanised divisions, two armoured divisions, one division-sized formation called Force Command Northern Areas, one engineer division, three artillery divisions (two are believed to possess ballistic missiles).	Major General	
4.	Brigade	A brigade usually comprises three or more battalions of different types and is commanded by a brigadier. Some brigades are independent of divisions and report either to Corps HQ or Army HQ (e.g. 111 Bde). The independent brigades include seven mechanised infantry brigades, eight armoured brigades, four artillery brigades, and nine engineer brigades: 105 Independent Infantry Brigade under V Corps; 105 Air Defence Independent Brigade Group in XXXI Corps; 111 Independent Infantry Brigade at Rawalpindi with X Corps; 212 Infantry Brigade at Lahore with IV Corps.	Brigadier	
5.	Regiment	The only active operations regiments (as opposed to administrative regiments) are training regiments. Colonels don't exercise command appointments except training commands, staff appointments, brigade executive officers and a few administrative establishment commands.	Colonel	No Star
6.	Battalion	A battalion has about 600–900 soldiers and is commanded by a lieutenant colonel. This number varies depending on the type of subunits of the battalion. A battalion comprises either three batteries (artillery or air defence) or four companies (infantry) or three squadrons (armoured).	Lieutenant Colonel	No Star
7.	Company	Headed by the major/captain, a company comprises about 120–150 soldiers.	Major - Captain	No Star
8.	Platoon	An intermediate between a company and section, a platoon is headed by a lieutenant or, depending on the availability of commissioned officers, a junior commissioned officer, with the rank of subedar major. It has a total strength of about 30–36 troops.	Second Lt./ Lt.	No Star
9.	Section	Smallest military outfit, with a strength of about 9–13 personnel. Commanded by a junior commissioned officer of the rank of subedar, depending upon the working conditions of the section.	Subedar - Naib Subedar	No Star

Indicates staff and higher command positions and offices
Indicates common command positions

=== Corps ===
There are nine corps (each including an independent signals brigade) and three corps-level formations (Air Defence, Aviation and Strategic Forces).

Logo/War flag	Corps	HQ Location	Current Commander	Major Corps Formations
	I Corps (Note: Formed in 1958 in Abbottabad, now based in Mangla; Fought in the 1965 and 1971 wars, as well as sent replacements to Kashmir for LOC.)	Mangla, Azad Kashmir	Lieutenant General Nauman Zakaria	6th Armoured Division (Gujranwala); 17th Infantry Division (Kharian); 37th Infantry Division (Kharian)
	II Corps (Note: Formed in 1968 in Lahore, transferred to Multan in 1969.)	Multan, Punjab	Lieutenant General Ahsan Gulrez	1st Armoured Division (Multan); 40th Infantry Division (Okara)
	IV Corps (Note: Formed in 1965 in Multan, transferred to Lahore in 1969.)	Lahore, Punjab	Lieutenant General Syed Fayyaz Hussain Shah	10th Infantry Division (Lahore); 11th Infantry Division (Lahore)
	V Corps (Note: Formed in 1975. 16, 18 IDs are all mechanized. Has a lot of independent Brigades as well, since it has all of Sindh to cover.)	Karachi, Sindh	Lieutenant General Avais Dastagir	16th Infantry Division (Pano Aqil); 18th Infantry Division (Hyderabad); 25th Mechanized Division (Malir)
	X Corps (Note: Raised in 1975 by Lt. Gen. Aftab Ahmad Khan)	Rawalpindi, Punjab	Lieutenant General Amer Ahsan Nawaz	Force Command Northern Areas (Gilgit); 12th Infantry Division (Murree); 19th Infantry Division (Mangla); 23rd Infantry Division (Jhelum); 34th Light Infantry Division (Chilas)
	XI Corps (Note: Formed in 1975. Presently engaged in fighting in the former Federally Administered Tribal Areas)	Peshawar, Khyber Pakhtunkhwa	Lieutenant General Syed Omer Ahmed Bokhari	7th Infantry Division, (Miranshah); 9th Infantry Division (Kohat)
	XII Corps (Note: Formed in 1985.)	Quetta, Balochistan	Lieutenant General Rahat Naseem Ahmed Khan	33rd Infantry Division (Khuzdar); 41st Infantry Division (Quetta); 44th Light Infantry Division (Gwadar)
	XXX Corps (Note: Formed in 1987. Each division has 4 brigades, and an armoured division is in the process of being raised.)	Gujranwala, Punjab	Lieutenant General Syed Imdad Hussain Shah	8th Infantry Division (Sialkot); 15th Infantry Division (Sialkot)
	XXXI Corps (Note: Formed in 1988.)	Bahawalpur, Punjab	Lieutenant General Muhammad Aqeel	14th Infantry Division (Okara); 26th Mechanized Division (Bahawalpur); 35th Infantry Division (Bahawalpur)
	Air Defence (Note: Formed in 1990.)	Rawalpindi, Punjab	Lieutenant General Muhammad Zafar Iqbal	3rd Air Defence Division (Sargodha); 4th Air Defence Division (Malir)
	Strategic Forces	Rawalpindi, Punjab	Lieutenant General Shehbaz Khan	2nd Artillery Division (Gujranwala); 21st Artillery Division (Pano Aqil); Strategic Forces North (Sargodha); Strategic Forces South (Petaro)
	Aviation (Note: Formed in 1977.)	Rawalpindi, Punjab	Major General Saeed Niazi	101 Avn Group (Rawalpindi); 202 Avn Group (Quetta); 303 Avn Group (Gujranwala); 404 Avn Group (Multan); 505 Avn Group (Mangla); 606 Avn Group(Tarbela)

=== Regional formations ===
In Pakistani military terminology, the regional commands are the temporary military formations that are structure based upon the conventional corps, and troop rotations are constant and varies based on the Pakistani war strategists' calculations. The regional commands are led by the three-star rank general officer whose staff includes numbers of general officers.

In past, the Eastern Command was organized at a corps-level conventional formation in East Pakistan (now Bangladesh), consisting of the 9th Infantry Division, 14th Infantry Division, and 16th Infantry Division. These divisions are still active duty with their respected Regiments. To further support the Eastern Command, the 36th Adhoc Division and 39th Adhoc Division were commissioned to support the paramilitary units and police; and subsequently decommissioned after Eastern Command was de-activated.

To address the challenges and issues faced by the Cold Start strategy of Indian Army, the army formed regional commands to protect the North—South regions by establishing the first the Southern Command in 1999 and later the Northern Command in 2008. Other active regional formations includes the Army Strategic Forces Command and the Army Air Defence Command that serves as a platform of missile defense.

Regional formational commands

- Eastern Command (1960-1971)
- Northern Command (2008–Present)
- Southern Command (1999–Present)
- Army Strategic Forces Command (2002–Present)
- Army Air Defence Command (1999–Present)
- Army Cyber Command (2022–Present)
- Army Rocket Force Command (2025–Present)

== Administrative structure ==
The Pakistan Army is organised in two main ways, which are Arms and Services.

=== Regiments ===
- Infantry:
  - Azad Kashmir Regiment (Note: The Azad Kashmir Regiment was raised in 1947, became part of the army in 1971.)
  - Punjab Regiment (Note: The Punjab Regiment formed in 1956 from the 1st, 14th, 15th and 16th Punjab Regiments; can be traced back to the 3rd Battalion of Coast Sepoys raised in 1759.)
  - Sindh Regiment (Note: The Sindh Regiment was raised in 1980 from battalions of the Punjab Regiment and Baloch Regiment.)
  - Baloch Regiment (Note: The Baloch Regiment formed in 1956 from the 8th Punjab Regiment, The 10th Baloch Regiment, and The Bahawalpur Regiment; can be traced back to the 3rd Madras Battalion raised in 1798.)
  - Frontier Force Regiment (Note: The Frontier Force Regiment is the successor to the Frontier Brigade raised in 1846.)
  - Northern Light Infantry Regiment (Note: The Northern Light Infantry was formed in 1977 from various paramilitary units of scouts, became part of the army in 1999 after the Kargil War.)
  - Mujahid Regiment
  - Special Services Group (Note: The Special Service Group was formed in 1959 around a cadre from the Baloch Regiment.)
- EME:
  - 55 EME Battalion
  - 53 EME Battalion
  - 544 EME
  - 42 EME Battalion
  - 43 EME Battalion
  - 118 EME Battalion
- Armour:
  - President's Bodyguard (Note: The President's Bodyguard formed at independence from members of the Governor General's Bodyguard, itself successor to the Governor's Troop of Moghals raised in 1773.)
  - Guides Cavalry (Note: Guides Cavalry is the successor to the Corps of Guides raised in 1846.)
  - 4th Cavalry (Valiants)
  - 5th Horse (Probyn's Horse) (Note: 5th Horse is the successor to the 1st Sikh Irregular Cavalry (Wales's Horse), and the 2nd Sikh Irregular Cavalry, both raised in 1857.)
  - 6th Lancers (Fateh Khem Karan) (Note: 6th Lancers is the successor to The Rohilkhand Horse raised in 1857, and the 4th Sikh Irregular Cavalry raised in 1858.)
  - 7th Lancers
  - 8 Cavalry (Izz-Ul-Khail)
  - 9th Horse (Arabian Horse)
  - 11th Cavalry (Frontier Force) (Note: 11th Cavalry (Frontier Force) is the successor to 1st Regiment of Punjab Cavalry and 3rd Regiment of Punjab Cavalry, both raised in 1849.)
  - 12th Cavalry (Sam Browne's Cavalry)
  - 13th Lancers (Spearheads) (Note: 13th Lancers is the successor to the 1st Native Troop raised in 1804, and the 2nd Native Troop raised in 1816. It is also the senior most armour regiment of the Indian Sub-Continent.)
  - 14th Lancers
  - 15th Lancers (Baloch Horse)
  - 16th Horse (al-Mugheerat)
  - 17th Lancers
  - 18th Horse
  - 19th Lancers (Note: 19th Lancers is the successor to the 2nd Mahratta Horse (Tiwana Horse) raised in 1858, and Fane's Horse raised in 1860.)
  - 20th Lancers (Haideri)
  - 21st Horse (Murtajiz)
  - 22nd Cavalry (Death or Glory)
  - 23rd Cavalry (Frontier Force)
  - 24th Cavalry (Chargers)
  - 25th Cavalry (Frontier Force)(Men of Steel) (Note: 25th Cavalry (Frontier Force) is the famous unit which stopped Indian armour thrust in Chawinda in 1965.)
  - 26th Cavalry (Mustangs)
  - 27th Cavalry (Steeds of war)(Ribat-ul-Khail)
  - 28th Cavalry (Chhamb Hunters)
  - 29th Cavalry (Tigers) (Note: 29th Cavalry Regiment, nicknamed as 'Royal Bengal Tigers' was the armored regiment stationed in former East Pakistan. Entire regiment was lost in 1971 war and was raised later with nickname 'Tigers'. Currently the regiment forms part of 6th Armored Division and is stationed at Kharian.)
  - 30th Cavalry (Bold Till Death)
  - 31st Cavalry (Sprocketeers)
  - 32nd Cavalry
  - 33rd Cavalry (Fortunes with the Bold)
  - 34th Lancers (Dragoons)
  - 35th Cavalry (al-Mubarizun) (Note: Raised 1 November 2014.)
  - 36th Cavalry
  - 37th Cavalry (Ribat-us-Sehra)
  - 38th Cavalry (Desert Hawks)
  - 39th Cavalry (Vanguards)
  - 40th Horse (Scinde Horse)
  - 41st Horse (Frontier Force)
  - 42nd Lancers (Punjab Lancers)
  - 43rd Cavalry (al-Zarib)
  - 44th Cavalry (Pioneers)
  - 45th Horse
  - 47th Cavalry
  - 51st Lancers (Silver Eagles)
  - 52nd Cavalry (Howal mastan)
  - 53rd Cavalry (Golden Eagles)
  - 54th Cavalry (Hizbullah)
  - 55th Cavalry
  - 56th Cavalry (Raad-ul-Harb)
  - 57th Lancers
  - 58th Cavalry
- Artillery
  - 3 Medium Regiment Artillery
  - 4 Medium Regiment Artillery
  - 5 MLRS Regiment
  - 7 Field Regiment Artillery
  - 15 SP Medium Regiment Artillery
  - 16 (SP) Medium Regiment Artillery
  - 17 Locating Regiment Artillery
  - 28 Medium Regiment Artillery
  - 30 (SP) Heavy Regiment Artillery
  - 32 Medium Regiment Artillery
  - 35 SP (Heavy) Regiment
  - 38 Field Regiment Artillery
  - 39 (SP) Medium Regiment Artillery
  - 44 Medium Regiment Artillery
  - 45 Field Regiment Artillery
  - 46 Field Regiment Artillery
  - 48 Field Regiment Artillery
  - 50 Field Regiment Artillery
  - 51 Medium Regiment Artillery
  - 54 Medium Regiment Artillery
  - 61 Medium Regiment Artillery
  - 63 Medium Regiment Artillery
  - 64 Medium Regiment Artillery
  - 65 Medium Regiment Artillery
  - 72 (SP) Medium Regiment Artillery
  - 79 Field Regiment Artillery
  - 86 Field Regiment Artillery
  - 93 Medium Regiment Artillery
  - 106 Medium Regiment Artillery
  - 115 Medium Regiment Artillery
  - 118 Medium Regiment Artillery
  - 139 (SP) Medium Regiment Artillery (WAKAZA)
  - 140 (SP) Medium Regiment Artillery
  - 150 Medium Regiment Artillery
  - 154 Medium Regiment Artillery
  - 156 Locating Regiment Artillery
  - 159 Locating Regiment
  - 162 Field Regiment Artillery
  - 165 Field Regiment Artillery
  - 170 Field Regiment Artillery
  - 172 MBRL Regiment
  - 174 Medium Regiment Artillery
  - 176 Missile Regiment Artillery
  - 184 (SP) Medium Regiment Artillery
  - 189 Missile Regiment Artillery
  - 197 Missile Regiment Artillery
  - 198 Missile Regiment Artillery
  - 830 Mujahid Field Regiment Artillery
  - 831 Mujahid Field Regiment Artillery
- Air Defence:
  - 74 Light Air Defence (SAM)
  - 88 Light Air Defence
  - 52 medium Airdefence ESHORAD
  - 58 medium Airdefence

Regiment

  - 97 RCG Air Defence Regiment
  - 98 RCG Air Defence Regiment
  - 102 Light Air Defence (SAM) Regiment
  - 103 Light Air Defence (GM) Regiment
  - 104 RCG Air Defence Regiment
  - 126 Light Air Defence (Gun Missile) Regiment
  - 127 Medium Air Defence Regiment
  - 134 Radar Control Guns Regiment
  - 146 Light Air Defence Regiment
  - 148 Light Air Defence (SP) Regiment
  - 153 Light Air Defence (SP) Regiment
  - 154 Light Air Defence (SP) Regiment
  - 160 RCG Air Defence Regiment
- Aviation Corps (AVN)
- Signals Corps (SIGS)
  - 2 Signal Battalion
  - 5 Signal Battalion
  - 7 Signal Battalion
  - 8 Signal Battalion
  - 9 Signal Battalion
  - 11 Signal Battalion
  - 12 Signal Battalion
  - 13 Signal Battalion
  - 15 Signal Battalion
  - 17 Signal Battalion
  - 19 Signal Battalion
  - 23 Signal Battalion
  - 24 Signal Battalion
  - 26 Signal Battalion
  - 28 Signal Battalion
  - 32 Signal Battalion
  - 44 Signal Battalion
  - 43 Signal Battalion
  - 45 Signal Battalion
  - 49 Signal Battalion
  - 51 Signal Battalion
  - 52 Signal Battalion
  - 69 Signal Battalion
  - 76 Signal Battalion
  - 77 Signal Battalion
  - 80 Signal Battalion
  - 82 RC Signal Battalion
  - 84 Signal Battalion
  - 86 Signal Battalion
  - 92 EW Signal Battalion
  - 93 Signal Battalion
- Engineers Corps (ENG)
  - 1 Engineer Battalion
  - 2 Engineer Battalion (ICHDEIN)(Makran Sappers)
  - 3 Engineer Battalion(Behtreen)
  - 4 Engineer Battalion (Jurrat o Istaklaal)
  - 5 Engineer Battalion (Laraka Panja)
  - 6 Engineer Battalion (The Mighty Six)
  - 7 Engineer Battalion
  - 8 Engineer Battalion (Chawinda Sappers)
  - 10 Engineer Battalion
  - 11 Engineer Battalion
  - 12 Engineer Battalion
  - 13 Engineer Battalion
  - 14 Engineer Battalion
  - 16 Engineer Battalion
  - 18 Engineer Battalion
  - 19 Engineer Battalion
  - 20 Engineer Battalion
  - 21 Engineer Battalion
  - 22 Engineer Battalion
  - 23 Engineer Battalion
  - 24 Engineer Battalion
  - 25 Engineer Battalion
  - 26 Engineer Battalion
  - 100 Engineer Battalion
  - 103 Engineer Battalion
  - 104 Engineer Battalion
  - 105 Engineer Battalion
  - 106 Engineer Battalion
  - 107 Engineer Battalion
  - 108 Engineer Battalion
  - 109 Engineer Battalion
  - 173 Engineer Battalion
  - 174 Engineer Battalion
  - 314 Assault Engineers Battalion
  - 474 Engineer Battalion
  - 479 Engineer Battalion
  - 662 Engineer Battalion
  - 141 Engineer RMB (Road maintenance battalion)
  - 142 Engineer RMB (Road maintenance Battalion)

=== Administrative Services ===
- Pakistan Army Medical Corps
- Service Corps (ASC)
- Military Police (MP)
- Electrical and Mechanical Engineering (EME)
- Education (AEC)
- Remount Veterinary and Farms (RVFC)
- Ordnance (ORD)
- Military Intelligence (MI)
