= List of serving generals of the Pakistan Army =

This is the list of serving officers (Maj Gen and above) in the Pakistan Army. At present the Army has 1 Field Marshal, 1 General, 29 Lieutenant Generals (including 1 from Army Medical Corps) and 189 Major Generals (including 27 from Army Medical Corps).

== Serving Field Marshal ==
Command flags	Appointment	Photo	Incumbent	Unit and course of commission	Awards
	Chief of Defence Forces (CDF) & Chief of the Army Staff (COAS)		Field Marshal; Asim Munir	23 Frontier Force Regiment; 17 OTS Course	Hilal-e-Jurat; Hilal-e-Imtiaz (Military); Nishan-e-Imtiaz (Military); Sword of Honour

== Serving Generals ==
Number	Command flag	Rank	Name	Position	Decorations	Unit
01		General	Syed Aamer Raza	Commander, National Strategic Command, GHQ, Rawalpindi	Hilal-e-Imtiaz (Military) Sitara-e-Basalat Nishan-i-Imtiaz (Military)	22 OTS - 6th Lancers (Watson's Horse)

== List of serving lieutenant generals ==
Sr. No	Name	Appt.	Unit and course of commission	Awards
01	Muhammad Asim Malik	Director General, Inter Services Intelligence (DG ISI) & National Security Advisor (NSA) to the Government of Pakistan	12 Baloch - 80 PMA LC	Hilal-e-Imtiaz (Military) Sword of Honour
02	Muhammad Shahbaz Khan	Commander, Army Strategic Force Command (ASFC), Rawalpindi	3 (SP) Medium Regiment Artillery - 82 PMA LC	Hilal-e-Imtiaz (Military) Sword of Honour
03	Rahat Naseem Ahmed Khan	President, National Defence University (NDU), Islamabad	1st Frontier Force Regiment - 82 PMA LC	Hilal-e-Imtiaz (Military)
04	Amer Ahsan Nawaz	Commander, X Corps, Rawalpindi	3 Baloch Regiment - 82 PMA LC	Hilal-e-Imtiaz (Military)
05	Sarfraz Ahmed	Commander, Army Air Defence Command (AADC), Rawalpindi	148 Light AD (SP) Regt (AK) - 82 PMA LC	Hilal-e-Imtiaz (Military)
06	Tahir Hameed Shah	Commander, XXX Corps, Gujranwala	60 Medium Regiment Artillery - 82 PMA LC	Hilal-e-Imtiaz (Military)
07	Shakir Ullah Khattak	Commander, I Corps, Mangla & Central Command.	13 Lancers - 83 PMA LC	Hilal-e-Imtiaz (Military)
08	Muhammad Aqeel	Commander, XXXI Corps, Bahawalpur	2 Frontier Force Regiment (Guides) - 83 PMA LC	Hilal-e-Imtiaz (Military)
09	Imdad Hussain Shah	Inspector General, Training & Evaluation (IGT&E), GHQ, Rawalpindi	33 AK Regiment - 83 PMA LC	Hilal-e-Imtiaz (Military)
10	Muhammad Avais Dastgir	Commander, V Corps, Karachi	58 Cavalry - 83 PMA LC	Hilal-e-Imtiaz (Military) Sitara-e-Imtiaz
11	Ahmed Sharif Chaudhry	Director General, Inter-Services Public Relations (DG ISPR), GHQ, Rawalpindi	43 Electrical and Mechanical Engineers	Hilal-e-Imtiaz (Military)
12	Omer Ahmed Bokhari	Chief of the General Staff (CGS), GHQ Rawalpindi	22 Baloch Regiment - 84 PMA LC	Hilal-e-Imtiaz (Military) Sword of Honour
13	Inayat Hussain	Commander, XII Corps, Quetta	2 Frontier Force Regiment (Guides) - 84 PMA LC	Hilal-e-Imtiaz (Military)
14	Muhammad Aamer Najam	Commander, II Corps, Multan	19 Sind Regiment (Sarbuland) - 84 PMA LC	Hilal-e-Imtiaz (Military)
15	Tabassum Habib	Inspector General, Arms (IG A), GHQ Rawalpindi	117 Medium Regiment Artillery - 84 PMA LC	Hilal-e-Imtiaz (Military)
16	Muhammad Hassan Khattak	Chairman, National Disaster Management Authority (NDMA), Islamabad	16 Frontier Force Regiment - 84 PMA LC	Hilal-e-Imtiaz (Military)
17	Azhar Waqas	Adjutant General (AG), GHQ, Rawalpindi	12 Punjab Regiment - 84 PMA LC	Hilal-e-Imtiaz (Military) Imtiazi Sanad
18	Muhammad Ishaq Khattak	Commander, Army Rocket Force Command (ARFC), Rawalpindi	36 Frontier Force Regiment 86 PMA LC	Hilal-e-Imtiaz (Military)
19	Chaudhary Amir Ajmal	Chief of Logistic Staff (CLS), GHQ, Rawalpindi	45 Baloch Regiment 86 PMA LC	Hilal-e-Imtiaz (Military)
20	Iftikhar Hassan Chaudhary	Commandant Pakistan Military Academy (Comdt PMA)	30 (SP) Heavy Regiment Artillery 86 PMA LC	Hilal-e-Imtiaz (Military)
21	Wajid Aziz	Inspector General, Communication & IT (IG C&IT)GHQ, Rawalpindi	39 Punjab Regiment 86 PMA LC	Hilal-e-Imtiaz (Military)
22	Muhammad Umer Bashir	Commander, IV Corps, Lahore	140 (SP) Medium Regiment Artillery 86 PMA LC	Hilal-e-Imtiaz (Military)
23	Asad Ur Rehman Cheema	National Coordinator at Prime Ministers Office, Islamabad	20 LT AD REGT “Sky Saviours” Army Air Defence 86 PMA LC	Hilal-e-Imtiaz (Military)
24	Muhammad Imtanan Babar	Engineer in Chief (E-in-C), GHQ, Rawalpindi	4 Engrs Bn 87 PMA LC	Hilal-e-Imtiaz (Military)
25	Noor Wali Khan	Quarter Master General (QMG), GHQ, Rawalpindi	59 Baloch Regiment 87 PMA LC	Hilal-e-Imtiaz (Military)
26	Muhammad Naeem Akhter	Commander, XI Corps, Peshawar	30 Azad Kashmir Regiment 87 PMA LC	Hilal-e-Imtiaz (Military)
27	Muhammad Nadeem Ashraf	Chairman, Pakistan Ordnance Factories (POF), Wah Cantt	99 Medium Regiment Artillery 87 PMA LC	Hilal-e-Imtiaz (Military)
28	Naseem Anwar	Military Secretary, GHQ, Rawalpindi	19 Frontier Force Regiment 87 PMA LC	Hilal-e-Imtiaz (Military)

== Serving lieutenant general from the Army Medical Corps ==
#	Name	Appt.	Awards
1	Arshad Naseem	Surgeon General / Director General Medical Services (Inter-Services), GHQ	Hilal-e-Imtiaz (Military)

== List of serving major generals ==
#	Name	Unit and course of commission	Appt.	Awards	Notes
1	Muhammad Shahbaz Tabassum (Superseded)	Corps of Military Intelligence 82 PMA LC	Director General - X (DG X), at Dte Gen ISI, Islamabad	Hilal-e-Imtiaz (Military)	
2	Faheem Amer	8 Cavalry; 84 PMA LC	Director General, Pakistan Armed Services Board (PASB), Ministry of Defence, Islamabad.	Hilal-e-Imtiaz (Military)	
3	Shahid Manzoor	2 Field Regiment Artillery; 84 PMA LC	Research and Development Establishment (RDE), GHQ, Rawalpindi	Hilal-e-Imtiaz (Military)	
4	Adil Rehmani	25 Frontier Force Regiment; 84 PMA LC	Director General, Sports & Fitness Directorate (DG S &F), at T &E Branch, GHQ, Rawalpindi	Hilal-e-Imtiaz (Military) Tamgha-e-Basalat	
5	Dilawar Khan	47 Field Regiment Artillery 84 PMA LC		Hilal-e-Imtiaz (Military)	
6	Abdul Moeed	27 Cavalry; 85 PMA LC	Director General, Anti Norcotics Force (DG ANF), at ANF Headquarters, Rawalpindi	Hilal-e-Imtiaz (Military)	
7	Arshad Mehmood	153 Medium Regiment Artillery; 85 PMA LC		Hilal-e-Imtiaz (Military)	
8	Muhammad Atif Mansha	12 Medium Regiment Artillery; 85 PMA LC	Director General, Federal Government Educational Institutions (DG FGEI), Rawalpindi	Hilal-e-Imtiaz (Military)	
9	Javed Dost Chandio	63 Frontier Force Regiment; 85 PMA LC	Director General, Production (DG P), at POF Wah Cantt.	Hilal-e-Imtiaz (Military)	
10	Kamran Tabrez Savera	47 Baloch Regiment; 85 PMA LC			
11	Sheharyar Pervez Butt	57 Cavalry; 85 PMA LC	Director General, Armoured Corps (DG AC), GHQ , Rawalpindi	Hilal-e-Imtiaz (Military) Imtiazi Sanad	
12	Syed Asif Hussain	21 Frontier Force Regiment; 85 PMA LC	Deputy Inspector General, Communication &IT (Dy IG C &IT), GHQ, Rawalpindi	Hilal-e-Imtiaz (Military)	
13	Muhammad Irfan Khan	57 Baloch Regiment 85 PMA LC	Chairman, Lahore Garrison Education System (LGES), Lahore	Hilal-e-Imtiaz (Military)	
14	Faisal Naseer	Corps of Military Intelligence; 85 PMA LC	National Coordinator, National Counter Terrorism Authority (NACTA), Islamabad	Hilal-e-Shujaat Tamgha-e-Basalat	
15	Muhammad Raza Aizad	15 Baloch Regiment; 86 PMA LC	Director General, Institute of Strategic Studies Research and Analysis (DG ISSRA), at NDU, Islamabad	Hilal-e-Imtiaz (Military) Sword of Honour	
16	Jawwad Ahmed Qazi	4 Baloch Regiment; 86 PMA LC	Force Commander, UN Mission for the Referendum in Western Sahara (MINURSO)	Hilal-e-Imtiaz (Military)	
17	Kamran Nazir Malik	68 Baloch Regiment; 86 PMA LC	Vice Chief of Logistics Staff-B (VCLS-B), at LS Branch, GHQ, Rawalpindi	Hilal-e-Imtiaz (Military)	
18	Ehsan Ali	55 Baloch Regiment; 86 PMA LC	Commander, Logistics Area (Comd Log Area), Peshawar	Hilal-e-Imtiaz (Military)	
19	Mushtaq Ali	Regiment of Artillery; 86 PMA LC	Dte Gen ISI, Islamabad	Hilal-e-Imtiaz (Military)	
20	Imran Ullah	95 EME Battalion	Director General, Defence Science Technology Organisation (DESTO), Rawalpindi	Hilal-e-Imtiaz (Military)	
21	Dr. Khurram Nisar	Electrical and Mechanical Engineers	Director General, Weapons System (DG Wpn Sys), NESCOM, at SPD, Rawalpindi	Hilal-e-Imtiaz (Military) Tamgha-e-Imtiaz (Military)	
22	Ahmad Bilal	17 Azad Kashmir Regiment; 86 PMA LC	Director General, Pakistan Army Corps of Remount Veterinary and Farms (DG RVF), GHQ, Rawalpindi	Hilal-e-Imtiaz (Military)	
23	Muhammad Qaddafi	20 Azad Kashmir Regiment; 86 PMA LC	Director General, Welfare & Rehabilitation (DG W &R), at AG Branch, GHQ, Rawalpindi	Hilal-e-Imtiaz (Military)	
24	Ghulam Shabeer Narejo	12 Baloch Regiment; 87 PMA LC	Director General, Organization and Methods (DG O &M), at AG Branch, GHQ Rawalpindi	Hilal-e-Imtiaz (Military)	
25	Muhammad Farhan Yousaf	36 Punjab Regiment; 87 PMA LC		Hilal-e-Imtiaz (Military)	
26	Muhammad Asim Khan	82 SP Medium Regiment Artillery; 87 PMA LC	Member Administration, Pakistan Atomic Energy Commission (PAEC), Islamabad	Hilal-e-Imtiaz (Military)	
27	Nadeem Yousaf	Army Aviation Corps; 87 PMA LC	Director General, Army Aviation (DG Army Avn), GHQ	Hilal-e-Imtiaz (Military)	
28	Ghulam Muhammad	Corps of Artillery; 87 PMA LC	Director General, Commercial and Open Program (DG C & OP), at SPD, Rawalpindi	Hilal-e-Imtiaz (Military)	
29	Muhammad Shahab Aslam (Superseded)	14 Sind Regiment; 87 PMA LC	Director General, Military Lands & Cantonments (DG ML&C), Rawalpindi	Hilal-e-Imtiaz (Military)	
30	Shahid Pervaiz	9 NLI Regiment; 87 PMA LC	Commander, Logistics Area (Comd Log Area), Gujranwala	Hilal-e-Imtiaz (Military)	
31	Umer Ahmed Shah	2 Signal Battalion; Grad Course	Director General, Signals (DG S), GHQ, Rawalpindi	Hilal-e-Imtiaz (Military)	
32	Muhammad Shahid Siddeeq	11 Signal Battalion; Grad Course	Director General, Cyber Ops Division (DG COD), Islamabad	Hilal-e-Imtiaz (Military)	
33	Abdul Sami	Corps of Engineers; Grad Course	Director General, Frontier Works Organization (DG FWO), Rawalpindi	Hilal-e-Imtiaz (Military)	
34	Kamal Anwar Chaudhry	10 Baloch Regiment; 88 PMA LC	Director General, Military Training (DG MT), at T&E Branch, GHQ Rawalpindi	Hilal-e-Imtiaz (Military) Sword of Honour	
35	Muneer ud Din	9 Punjab Regiment; 88 PMA LC		Hilal-e-Imtiaz (Military)	
36	Farrukh Shahzad Rao	Army Services Corps; 88 PMA LC	Director General, National Logistics Corporation (DG NLC), at HQ NLC, Rawalpindi	Hilal-e-Imtiaz (Military)	
37	Adnan Sarwar Malik	3 Frontier Force Regiment; 88 PMA LC	Vice Chief of General Staff-Alpha (VCGS-A), at GS Branch, GHQ, Rawalpindi	Hilal-e-Imtiaz (Military)	
38	Omar Maqbool	12th Cavalry (Frontier Force); 88 PMA LC	MRC	Hilal-e-Imtiaz (Military)	
39	Salman Moin	14 Baloch Regiment; 88 PMA LC	Director General, Staff Duties (DG SD), at COAS Sectt. GHQ, Rawalpindi		
40	Amer Ashfaq Kayani	Army Air Defence; 88 PMA LC			
41	Malik Amir Muhammad Khan	6 Frontier Force Regiment; 88 PMA LC	Commander, Logistics Area (Comd Log Area), Rawalpindi		
42	Adeel Haider Minhas	19 Signal Battalion 88 PMA LC	Director General - Technical (DG T), at Dte Gen ISI, Islamabad.	Hilal-e-Imtiaz (Military)	
43	Syed Ali Raza	28 Signal Battalion 88 PMA LC	Director General, Command Control Communication Computer and Intelligence (DG C4I), at C &IT Branch, GHQ, Rawalpindi	Hilal-e-Imtiaz (Military)	
44	Muhammad Yasir Elahi	314 Assault Engineers; 88 PMA LC	Surveyor General, at Survey of Pakistan, Rawalpindi	Hilal-e-Imtiaz (Military)	
45	Ahsan Waqas Kayani	5 Baloch Regiment; 88 PMA LC	Commander, Logistics Area (Comd Log Area), Quetta	Hilal-e-Imtiaz (Military)	
46	Azhar Yasin	23 Sindh Regiment; 88 PMA LC	Director General, Special Security Force (DG SSF), at NSC, Islamabad	Hilal-e-Imtiaz (Military)	
47	Qaisar Suleman	39 Punjab Regiment; 88 PMA LC	Additional Secretary - IV (Army), Ministry of Defence (AS-IV MoD) Rawalpindi		
48	Omer Naseem	5th Horse; 89 PMA LC	Director General, Defense Export Promotion Organization (DG DEPO)	Hilal-e-Imtiaz (Military) Sword of Honour	
49	Syed Abbas Ali	45 Field Regiment Artillery 89 PMA LC	General Officer Commanding Strategic Forces South (GOC SFS), Petaro		
50	Muhammad Abbas	172 MBRL Regiment Artillery 89 PMA LC	Director General, Perspective Planning Cell (DG PPC), at COAS Sectt. GHQ, Rawalpindi		
51	Muhammad Shahid Abro	107 Field Regiment Artillery 89 PMA LC	Director General, Artillery (DG Arty), GHQ, Rawalpindi		
52	Luqman Hafeez	16 Engineers Battalion 89 PMA LC	Director General, Housing (DG H), at AG Branch, GHQ, Rawalpindi		
53	Haroon Ishaq Raja	4 Azad Kashmir Regiment; 89 PMA LC	Southern Command, Quetta		
54	Aamer Amin	19 Frontier Force Regiment; 89 PMA LC	Director General, ESA at Strategic Plans Division (SPD), DF HQ, Rawalpindi		
55	Haroon Hameed Chaudhry	19 Punjab Regiment; 89 PMA LC	Director General (A), Inter Services Public Relations Directorate, GHQ, Rawalpindi		
56	Waseem Iftikhar Cheema	2 Azad Kashmir Regiment; 89 PMA LC	Commander, Logistics Area (Comd Log Area), Multan		
57	Muhammad Hussain	9 Sindh Regiment; 89 PMA LC	Director General, Lands (DG L), at AG Branch, GHQ, Rawalpindi		
58	Shoaib Bin Akram	23 Frontier Force Regiment; 89 PMA LC	Director General, Airports Security Force (DG ASF), HQ ASF, Karachi	Tamgha-e-Basalat	
59	Kashif Khalil	17 Sindh Regiment; 89 PMA LC	Director General, Doctrine & Evaluation Directorate (DG D&E), GHQ Rawalpindi	Sitara-e-Jurat	
60	Kashif Abdullah	31 Punjab Regiment; 89 PMA LC	Director General, Military Operations (DG MO), at General Staff Branch, GHQ, Rawalpindi	Hilal-e-Imtiaz (Military) Sitara-e-Basalat	
62	Ahmad Kamal	41 Supply & Transport Battalion; 89 PMA LC	Director General, Supply & Transport (DG S &T), at LS Branch, GHQ, Rawalpindi		
62	Yasir Nawaz Janjua	Corps of Artillery; 89 PMA LC	General Officer Commanding Strategic Forces North (GOC SFN), Sargodha	Hilal-e-Imtiaz (Military) Tamgha-e-Basalat	
63	Rana Arfan Shakeel Ramay	Corps of Military Intelligence (106 Medium Regiment Artillery) 89 PMA LC	Director General, Bravo (DG B), at Dte Gen ISI, Islamabad	Sitara-e-Imtiaz	
64	Saeed ur Rehman Sarwar	699 Aviation EME Battalion	Director, School of Interdisciplinary Engineering & Sciences (SINES), at NUST, Islamabad		
65	Zulfiqar Ali Bhatti	32 Cavalry; 90 PMA LC	Director General (B), "Information Operations" Inter Services Public Relations Directorate, GHQ, Rawalpindi		
66	Ali Iqbal	6 Lancers; 90 PMA LC	Chairman, Heavy Industries Taxila (HIT), Taxila Cantt		
67	Muhammad Shahzad Khan	8 Cavalry; 90 PMA LC	Chief Instructor ‘B’ Div (CI (B) Div), NDU, Islamabad		
68	Kamran Ahmad	26 Cavalry; 90 PMA LC			
69	Abubakar Shahbaz	24 Cavalry (FF); 90 PMA LC	Additional Secretary, Ministry of Defence Production,(AS MoDP) ,Rawalpindi		
70	Muhammad Shamraiz Khan	Corps of Artillery; 90 PMA LC	Director General - S (DG S), at Dte Gen ISI, Islamabad		
71	Imran Arif	Corps of Artillery; 90 PMA LC	Commandant, School of Artillery (Cmdt SoA), Nowshera	Hilal-e-Imtiaz (Military)	
72	Sajid Amin Awan	48 Field Regiment Artillery⁸; 90 PMA LC	Director General, Special Investmet Facilitation Council (DG SIFC), at PM sectt. Islamabad	Sword of Honour	
73	Kamran Saleem	6 Lt Air Defence; 90 PMA LC	Director General, Air Defence (DG AD), at Air Defence Branch GHQ, Rawalpindi		
74	Anjum Riaz	1 Northern Light Infantry; 90 PMA LC			
75	Muhammad Intikhab Alam	4 Punjab Regiment; 90 PMA LC			
76	Shahid Amir Afsar	39 Punjab Regiment; 90 PMA LC	General Officer Commanding 9 Infantry Division (GOC 9 Inf Div), Kohat		
77	Nisar Ul Haq	17 Frontier Force Regiment; 90 PMA LC	MRC DF HQ		
78	Jawad Riaz	11 Baloch Regiment; 90 PMA LC	Director General- P (DG P), at Dte Gen ISI, Islamabad		
79	Waseem Haider Shah	8 Baloch Regiment; 90 PMA LC	Director General, Personnel Administration (DG PA), at AG Branch, GHQ, Rawalpindi		
80	Naiknam Muhammad Baig	14 Punjab Regiment; 90 PMA LC	Pro Rector Skills at NUTECH, Islamabad		
81	Umar Farid	45 Punjab Regiment; 90 PMA LC	Additional Secretary-V Army (AS-V), at MoD, Rawalpindi		
82	Mazhar Nazir	2 Frontier Force Regiment (Guides); 90 PMA LC	General Officer Commanding 35 Infantry Division (GOC 35 Inf Div), Bahawalpur		
83	Muhammad Atif Bin Akram	6 Punjab Regiment; 90 PMA LC	Director General - C (DG C), at Dte Gen ISI, Islsmabad		
84	Muhammad Imran Khan Babar	13 Sindh Regiment; 90 PMA LC	Director General, Foreign Military Cooperation (DG FMC), at DF HQ, Rawalpindi	Imtiazi Sanad	
85	Syed Muhammad Jawad Tariq	14 Frontier Force Regiment; 90 PMA LC	Private Secretary to COAS (PS-C), GHQ Rawalpindi		
86	Malik Muhammad Shehzad	Electrical and Mechanical Engineering			
87	Naveed Ahmad	Electrical and Mechanical Engineering	Director General, Project Management Organization (DG PMO), Taxila		
88	Adnan Sultan	12 cavalry (FF) 91 PMA LC			
89	Usman Farooq Kiyani	6 Lancers 91 PMA LC	General Officer Commanding 1 Armoured Division (GOC 1 Armd Div), Multan		
90	Rao Imran Sartaj	16 SP Medium Artillery 91 PMA LC	Inspector General, Frontier Corps, Khyber Pakhtunkhwa, North (IG FC KP N), Peshawar		
91	Yahya Usman Gondal	44 SP Medium Regiment Artillery 91 PMA LC			
92	Usman Iqbal	65 Medium Regiment Artillery 91 PMA LC	General Officer Commanding 2 Artillery Division (GOC 2 Arty Div), Gujranwala		
93	Saeed Anwar	Army Aviation Corps 91 PMA LC	Vice Chief of Logistics Staff-A (VCLS-A), LS Branch, Rawalpindi		
94	Attiq Ahmed	Electrical and Mechanical Engineering	Director General, Corps of Electrical and Mechanical Engineers (DG EME), GHQ, Rawalpindi		
95	Mehr Omer Khan	2 Baloch Regiment; 91 PMA		Sword of Honour	
96	Syed Imtiaz Hussain Gillani	19 Punjab Regiment 91 PMA LC	Vice Chief of General Staff-Bravo (VCGS-B), at GS Branch GHQ, Rawalpindi		
97	Ahmad Jawad	28 Baloch Regiment 91 PMA LC	General Officer Commanding Special Services Group (GOC SSG), Tarbela		
98	Tajdeed Mumtaz	30 Baloch Regiment; 91 PMA LC	Commander, Force Command Northern Areas (FCNA), Gilgit		
99	Bilal Sarfaraz	12 Baloch Regiment; 91 PMA LC	Defence Forces HQ, Rawalpindi		
100	Julian Moazzam James	136 RCG AD / 3 Commando Battalion SSG (Powindahs); 92 PMA LC	General Officer Commanding 3 Air Defence Division (GOC 3 AD Div), Sargodha	Tamgha-e-Basalat	
101	Khurram Shabbir	35 Azad Kashmir Regiment; 92 PMA LC	General Officer Commanding 17 Infantry Division (GOC 17 Inf Div), Kharian		
102	Faisal Saud	28 Frontier Force 92 PMA LC			
103	Abid Mazhar	12 Punjab Regiment; 92 PMA LC	Additional Secretary, Ministry of Interior (AS MOI), Rawalpindi		
104	Shahryar Munir Hafiez	7 Frontier Force Regiment 92 PMA LC	General Officer Commanding 33 Infantry Division (GOC 33 Inf Division), Khuzdar		
105	Shehryar Qureshi	5 Baluch Regiment 92 PMA LC			
106	Adil Iftikhar Warriach	34 Azad Kashmir Regiment; 92 PMA LC	Director General, Military Intelligence (DG MI), at GS Branch, GHQ, Rawalpindi		
107	Amjad Aziz Mughal	39 Punjab Regiment; 92 PMA LC	Director General, Commercial (DG C), at POF Wah Cantt.		
108	Zulfikar Shaheen	3 Punjab Regiment; 92 PMA LC	Commandant, School of Infantry & Tactics (SI&T), Quetta		
109	Habib Nawaz	36 Baloch Regiment; 92 PMA LC	General Officer Commanding 44 Infantry Division (GOC 44 Inf Div), Gawadar		
110	Zill-e-Husnain	14 Field Regiment Artillery 93 PMA LC	General Officer Commanding 15 Infantry Division (GOC 15 Inf Div), Sialkot		
111	Muhammad Shoaib	Artillery 93 PMA LC	General Officer Commanding 21 Artillery Div (GOC 21 Arty Div), Pano Aqil		
112	Saad Al Abd	Corps of Military Intelligence	Director General - H (DG H), at Dte Gen ISI, Islamabad		
113	Muhammad Faisal Ghaffar Rana	16 Northern Light Infantry 93 PMA LC	General Officer Commanding 11 Infantry Division (GOC 11 Inf Div), Lahore		
114	Nauman Manzoor Awan	9 Frontier Force Regiment (Wilde's) 93 PMA LC	Commandant, Command and Staff College (C&SC), Quetta		
115	Muhammad Asim	21 Baluch Regiment 93 PMA LC	General Officer Commanding 19 Infantry Division (GOC 19 Inf Div), Mangla		
116	Tauqeer Abbas	60 Baluch Regiment 93 PMA LC	General Officer Commanding 23 Infantry Division (GOC 23 Inf Div), Jhelum		
117	Asif Aziz Khan	28 Azad Kashmir Regiment 93 PMA LC			
118	Mansoor Nasir	108 Engineer Battalion 93 PMA LC	Director General, Works & Chief Engineer Army (DG W &CE – A), GHQ Rawalpindi		
119	Azat Sajjad Khan	30 Cavalry 94 PMA LC	Director General - Analysis (DG A), at Dte Gen ISI, Islamabad.		
120	Sardar Muhammad Tariq Khan	51 Lancer (Silver Eagle's) 94 PMA LC	General Officer Commanding 6 Armoured Division (GOC 6 Armd Div), Gujranwala.		
121	Atif Bashir	14 Frontier Force 94 PMA LC	General Officer Commanding 10 Infantry Division (GOC 10 Inf Div), Lahore		
122	Zarrar Mehmood	29 Frontier Force 94 PMA LC	General Officer Commanding 12th Infantry Division (GOC 12 Inf Div), Murree		
123	Mumtaz Ali	10 Punjab Regiment 94 PMA LC	General Officer Commanding 41 Infantry Division (GOC 41 Inf Div), Quetta		
124	Ali Ejaz Rafi	2 Frontier Force Regiment (Guides) 94 PMA LC			
125	Bilal Mehmood	9 Punjab Regt 94 PMA LC	General Officer Commanding 37 Infantry Division (GOC 37 DIV), Kharian		
126	Mudasser Saeed	5 Sindh Regiment 94 PMA LC	General Officer Commanding 40 Infantry Division (GOC 40 Div), Okara		
127	Muhammad Atif Mujtaba	38 Azad Kashmir (HAT) Regiment 94 PMA LC	Inspector General, Frontier Corps North (IG FC N ) Balochistan, Quetta		
128	Fahham Bin Sultan	Avn EME Grad Course	Director General, Aviation Fleet Management (AFM), GHQ Rawalpindi	Hilal-e-Imtiaz (Military)	
129	Majid Hussain Bhatti	Ordanance 94 PMA LC	Director General, Ordanance Services (DG OS) ,GHQ Rawalpindi		
130	Hussain Masud	24 Cavalry 94 PMA LC	General Officer Commanding 25 Mechanized Division (GOC 25 Mech Div), Malir		
131	Saad Mehmood	19 Lancers 95 PMA LC		Sword of Honour	
132	Muhammad Obaid Khan	67 Lt SP Air Defence 95 PMA LC			
133	Imad Ud Din	122 Fd Coy Engr 95 PMA LC	Director General, Engineers (DG Engrs), GHQ Rawalpindi		
134	Wasim Arif	11 Frontier Force Regiment (MIB) 94 PMA LC	General Officer Commanding 7 Infantry Division (GOC 7 Inf Div), Miranshah		
135	Sajid Mehmood	32 Punjab Regiment 96 PMA LC	Director General - Z (DG Z), at Dte Gen ISI, Islamabad		
136	Hassan Mehdi	15 Punjab Regiment 94 PMA LC	Chief Of Staff, Central Commmand (COS CC), Kharian		
137	Mazhar Farid	10 AK Regiment 96 PMA LC	Director General, Pakistan Rangers (Punjab), Lahore		
138	Shahzad Azeem	3 Sindh Regiment 95 PMA LC	Inspector General, Frontier Corps Khyber Pakhtunkhwa, South (IG FC KP (S), Wana		
139	Sajid Akbar	39 Azad Kashmir Regiment 95 PMA LC	General Officer Commanding 16 Infantry Division (GOC 16 Inf Div),Pano Aqil		
140	Ameer Muhammad Umrani	36 Baluch Regiment 96 PMA LC	Chief of Staff, Army Rocket Force Command (ARFC), GHQ, Rawalpindi		
141	Waqas Ahmed Qureshi	38 Frontier Force Regiment 96 PMA LC	General Officer Commanding 14 Infantry Division (GOC 14 Inf Div), Okara		
142	Laiq Rafiq	25 Azad Kashmir Regiment 93 PMA LC	Director General, Pakistan Rangers Sind Karachi		
143	Qulb e Hasnain	40 Baloch Regiment 95 PMA LC	Additional Secretary - I Army (AS-I), at MoD, Rawalpindi		
144	Zafar Iqbal	5 Azad Kashmir Regiment 95 PMA LC	Inspector General, Frontior Corp South (IG FC S), Balochistan,Turbat		
145	Atif Rafique	Baloch Regiment 95 PMA LC	Director General, Pakistan Coast Guards (DG PCG), Karachi		
146	Saif Ullah Cheema	175 Missile Regiment Artillery 95 PMA LC	General Officer Commanding 34 Infantry Division (GOC 34 Inf Div) , SSD, Rawalpindi		
147	Shafqat Nawaz	106 Medium Artillery 95 PMA LC			
148	Fawad Ali	Guides Cavalry (FF) 96 PMA LC		Sword of Honour	
149	Ahmed Farhan Qureshi	26 Baloch Regiment 96 PMA LC	Inspector General, Frontier Corps West (IG FC W), Balochistan, Khuzdar		
150	Gul Hassan	4 Medium Artillery 96 PMA LC			
151	Muhammad Bilal	170 Field Artillery 94 PMA LC	Commandant, Pakistan Military Academy Kakul (Comdt PMA), Abbottabad		
152	Qasim Shahzad	7 Field Regiment Artillery 96 PMA LC	ASFC		
153	Abubakar Farooq	10 Medium Artillery 96 PMA LC	General Officer Commanding 18 Infantry Division (GOC 18 Inf Div), Hyderabad		
154	Ahmed Nadeem Bajwa	53 Cavalry 96 PMA LC			
155	Usman Sajjad	1 LOMAD(Air Defence) 96 PMA LC	General Officer Commanding 4 Air Defence Division (GOC 4 AD Div), Malir		
156	Sajjad Sarwar	16 Signal Battalion 96 PMA LC			
157	Sajjad Haider	11 Signals Battalion 96 PMA LC	Director General, Special Communication Organization ( DG SCO), Rawalpindi		
158	Faisal Umair	Avn 96 PMA LC			
159	Ahmed Salman	Avn 96 PMA LC	General Officer Commanding Army Aviation Command (GOC Army Avn), Rawalpindi		
160	Rana Faisal Rafique	Ord 90 PMA LC	Director General, Procurement (DG P), GHQ, Rawalpindi		
161	Faisal Hassan	313 Assault Engineer (Al Badr Sappers) Grad Course	General Officer Commanding 45 Engineers Division (GOC 45 Engr Div), Rawalpindi		
162	Altaf Anjum	2 Engineers (Makran Sappers) 96 PMA LC			

== List of serving major generals from the Army Medical Corps ==
#	Name	Appt.	Awards
01	Nadeem Fazal	Director General Medicine, Med Dte, GHQ	Hilal-e-Imtiaz (Military) Tamgha-e-Imtiaz (Military)
02	Nadeem Ahmed Rana		Hilal-e-Imtiaz (Military)
03	Tahir Masood Ahmad	Director General Surgery, Med Dte, GHQ	Hilal-e-Imtiaz (Military)
04	Waseem Ahmad Khan	Head of Department Surgery Unit 3 MH, Rawalpindi	Hilal-e-Imtiaz (Military)
05	Viqar Un Nisa Ashraf	Advisor in (Gynaecology) / Head of Department (Gynaecology / Obstetric), Pak Emirates Military Hospital, Rawalpindi	Hilal-e-Imtiaz (Military)
06	Fuad Siddique	Advisor in (Medicine) / Head of Department (Medicine), Combined Military Hospital (CMH), Rawalpindi	Hilal-e-Imtiaz (Military)
07	Zeeshan Ahmed	Head of Department Neonatal and Pediatric Intensive Care Unit, CMH Rawalpindi	Hilal-e-Imtiaz (Military)
08	Sohail Ilyas	Head of Department Surgery Unit 1, CMH, Rawalpindi	Hilal-e-Imtiaz (Military)
09	Syed Mukarram Hussain	Head of Department Surgery Unit 2, CMH Rawalpindi	Hilal-e-Imtiaz (Military)
10	Maqbool Raza	Head of Department and Advisor in (ENT), Combined Military Hospital (CMH), Rawalpindi	Tamgha-e-Imtiaz (Military)
11	Iftikhar Ahmed Satti	Director General Medical Directorate, GHQ	Hilal-e-Imtiaz (Military)
12	Sibtain Rafique	Director General Med Proc & Stores, Med Dte, GHQ	Hilal-e-Imtiaz (Military)
13	Ijaz Ahmad	Director General Medical Services (Navy)	Hilal-e-Imtiaz (Military)
14	Rizwan Sadiq	Inspector General Hospitals, Med Dte, GHQ	Hilal-e-Imtiaz (Military)
15	Tufail Ahmad	Commandant Combined Military Hospital (CMH), Rawalpindi	
16	Muhammad Fayyaz Malik	Director General Med Dte, GHQ	
17	Anjum Anwar Qadri	Advisor in Anesthesiology	
18	Muhammad Rafique	Commandant Armed Forces Post Graduate Medical Institute, Rawalpindi	
19	Haroon Sabir	Commandant Armed Forces Institute of Urology (AFIU), Rawalpindi	
20	Farhan Ahmed Majeed	Advisor in Thoracic Surgery	
21	Khurram Haq Nawaz	Principal Army Medical College, Rawalpindi	
22	Qamar Husnain Khan	Commandant Military Hospital Rawalpindi	
23	Muhammad Farid	Commandant Combined Military Hospital Lahore	
24	Nadeem Paracha	Consultant Oncologist / HOD Oncology, Military Hospital Rawalpindi	
25	Waqar Muzaffar	Commandant Armed Forces Institute of Ophthalmology, Rawalpindi	
26	Nasir Ali	Commandant Army Cardiac Hospital (ACH), Lahore	
27	Muhammad Nadir Khan	Commandant Armed Forces Institute of Cardiology AFIC/ National Institute of Heart Diseases, Rawalpindi	

== Notes ==
All the names in the list are extracted from open sources (which in turn rely on Pakistan Army's ISPR press releases); therefore, the above names may not correlate with the actual current posts of the commanders.

Additionally, the seniority for major-generals is ascertained from the bi-annual military award recipients of Hilal-e-Imtiaz (Military); first on 23 March (Pakistan Day) and then on 14 August (Independence Day). The links from 1999 and onwards are: 1999 March & August, 2001 March & August, 2003 March, 2003 August, 2004 March, 2004 August, 2005 March, 2005 August, 2006 March, 2006 August, 2007 March, 2007 August, 2008 March, 2008 August, 2009 March, 2009 August, 2010 March, 2010 August, 2011 March, 2011 August, 2012 March, 2012 August, 2013 March, 2013 August, 2014 March, 2014 August, 2015 August, 2016 March, 2016 August, and 2017 March.

Similarly, civilian and military awards for outstanding individuals are announced every year on 14 August and an investiture ceremony is held on the following 23 March. The links from 2001 and onwards are: 2001, 2001, 2002, 2003, 2004, 2005, 2006, 2007, 2008, 2009, 2012, 2013, 2014, and 2015.

Information is also gleaned from the wreath-laying ceremonies for the 10 Nishan-e-Haider recipients each year on 6 September (Defence Day). The links from 2005 onwards are: 2005, 2006, 2007, 2008, 2009, 2010, 2011, 2012, 2013, and 2014.

Following abbreviations have been used for the respective units/regiments of the officers,

- AC – Armoured Corps
- ARTY – Regiment of Artillery
- AAD – Army Air Defence
- ENGRS – Corps of Engineers
- SIGS – Corps of Signals
- INF – Infantry
  - Punjab – Punjab Regiment
  - Baloch – Baloch Regiment
  - FF – Frontier Force Regiment
  - AK – Azad Kashmir Regiment
  - Sind – Sind Regiment
  - NLI – Northern Light Infantry
- AVN – Army Aviation Corps
- MI – Corps of Military Intelligence
- ASC – Army Service Corps
- ORD – Ordnance Corps
- EME – Corps of Electrical and Mechanical Engineers
- AMC – Army Medical Corps
- AEC - Army Education Corls
- RV&FC - Remount Veterinary and Farms Corps
- LB - Logistics Branch

== See also ==
- List of serving air marshals of the Pakistan Air Force
- List of serving admirals of the Pakistan Navy
