= Sapper =

Soldier who performs a variety of military engineering duties

Modern sapper equipment

A sapper, also called a combat engineer, is a combatant or soldier who performs a variety of military engineering duties, such as breaching fortifications, demolitions, bridge-building, laying or clearing minefields, preparing field defenses, and road and airfield construction and repair.

Sappers are also trained and equipped to serve secondarily as provisional infantry.

Sappers facilitate and support the movement, defense, and survival of superordinate and allied forces, and impede those of enemies.

The term sapper is used in the British Army, Australian Army, Commonwealth nations, the U.S. military, and the militaries of other countries.

== Historical origin ==
=== Sapper ===
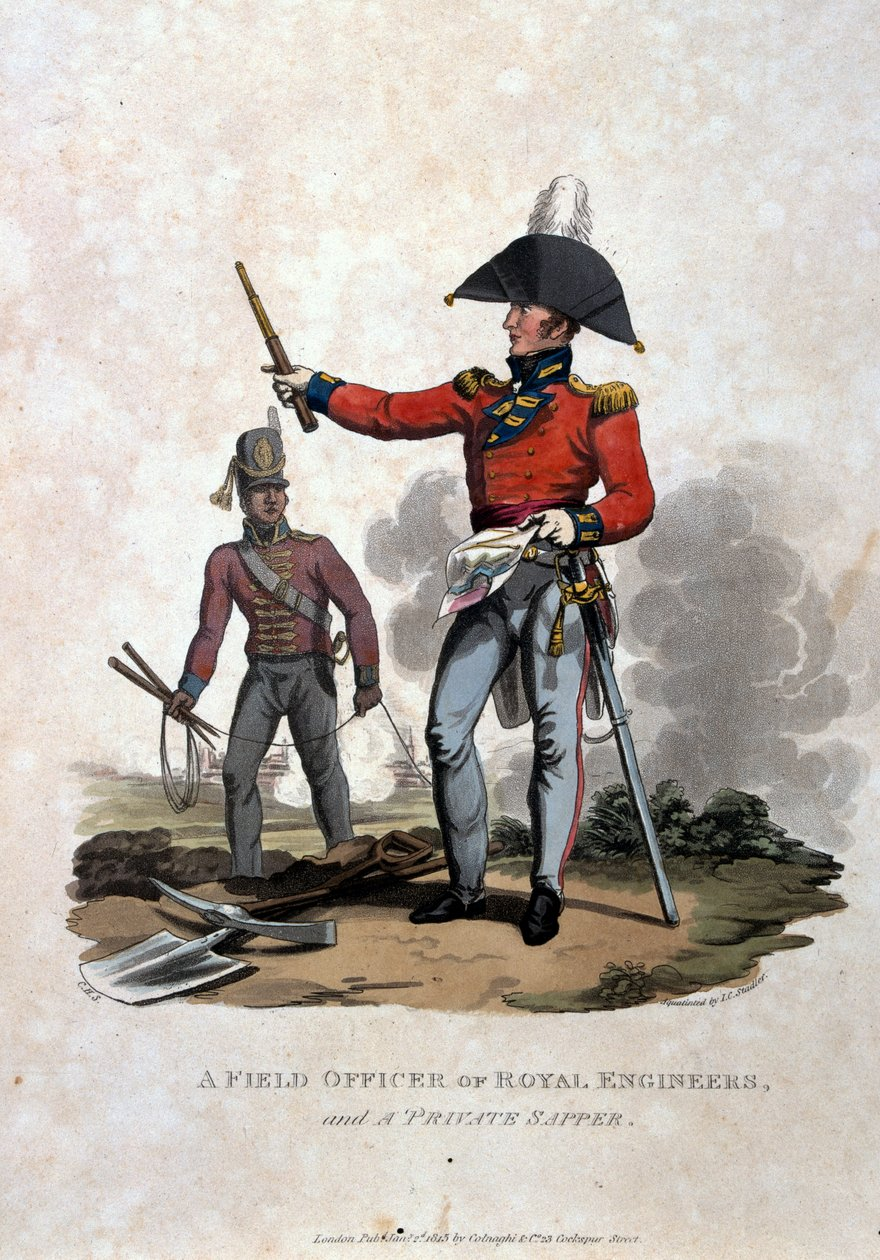
1815 engraving of a British Army sapper (left)

A sapper, in the sense first used by the French military, was one who dug trenches to allow besieging forces to advance towards the enemy defensive works and forts over ground that is under the defenders' musket or artillery fire. It comes from the French word sapeur, itself being derived from the verb saper (to undermine, to dig under a wall or building to cause its collapse). This digging was referred to as sapping the enemy fortifications.

Saps were excavated by brigades of trained sappers or instructed troops. When an army was defending a fortress with cannons, they had a height and range advantage over the attacker's guns. The attacking army's artillery had to be brought forward, under fire, so as to facilitate effective counter-battery fire. This was achieved by digging what the French termed a sappe (derived from the archaic French word for spade or entrenching tool). Using techniques developed and perfected by Vauban, the sappers began the trench at such an angle so as to avoid enemy fire enfilading the sappe by firing down its length. As they pressed forward, a position was prepared from which a cannon could suppress the defenders on the fort's bastions. The sappers would then change the course of their trench, zig-zagging toward the fortress wall. Each leg brought the attacker's artillery closer until the besieged cannon would be sufficiently suppressed for the attackers to breach the walls. Broadly speaking, sappers were originally experts at demolishing or otherwise overcoming or bypassing fortification systems.

=== Miner ===
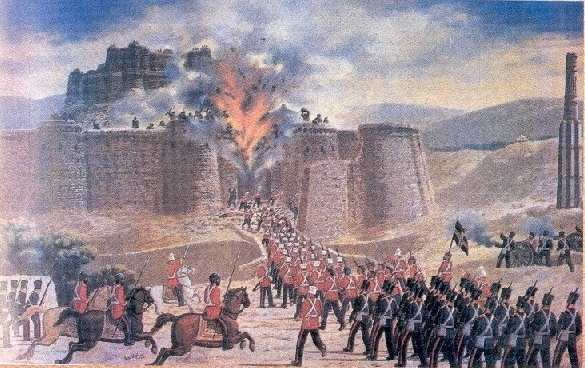
The fort of Ghazni which fell as a result of mining by a mixed contingent of the Bombay and Bengal Sappers during the First Afghan War on 23 July 1839.

An additional term applied to sappers of the British Indian Army was "miner." The native engineer corps were called "sappers and miners," for example, the Royal Bombay Sappers and Miners. The term arose from a task done by sappers to further the battle after saps were dug. The saps permitted cannons to be brought into firing range of the besieged fort and its cannons, but often the cannons themselves were unable to breach the fort walls. The engineers would dig a tunnel from the forward-most sap up to and under the fort wall, then place a charge of gunpowder and ignite it, causing an explosion that would destroy the wall and permit attacking infantry to close with the enemy. This was dangerous work, often lethal to the sappers, and was fiercely resisted by the besieged enemy. Since the two tasks went hand in hand and were done by the same troops, native Indian engineer corps came to be called "sappers and miners".

== Specific usage ==
=== Commonwealth of Nations ===
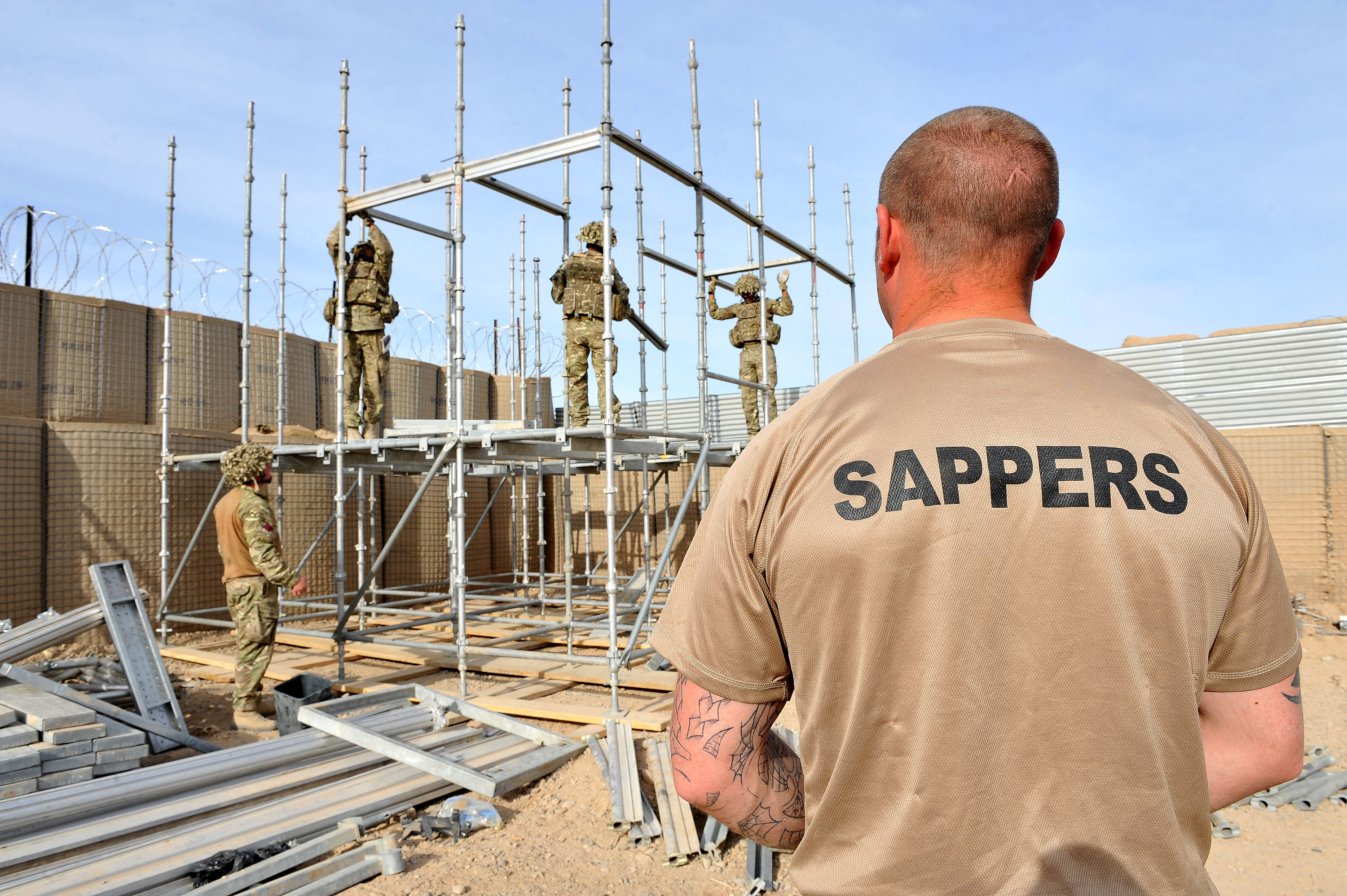
A sapper of the Royal Engineers watches as soldiers reinforce security at FOB (Forward Operating Base) Shawqat in Afghanistan.

Sapper (abbreviated Spr) is the Royal Engineers' equivalent of private. This is also the case within the Indian Army Corps of Engineers, Pakistan Army Corps of Engineers, Royal Canadian Engineers, Royal Australian Engineers, South African Army Engineer Formation, Jamaica Defence Force Engineer Regiment, and Royal New Zealand Engineers. The term "sapper" was introduced in 1856, when the Corps of Royal Sappers and Miners was amalgamated with the officer corps of the Royal Engineers to form the Corps of Royal Engineers.

During the course of the First World War, some Royal Marines also took the rank of sapper. This was adopted as tradition in the Royal Marine Divisional Engineers of the Royal Naval Division.

=== Australia ===
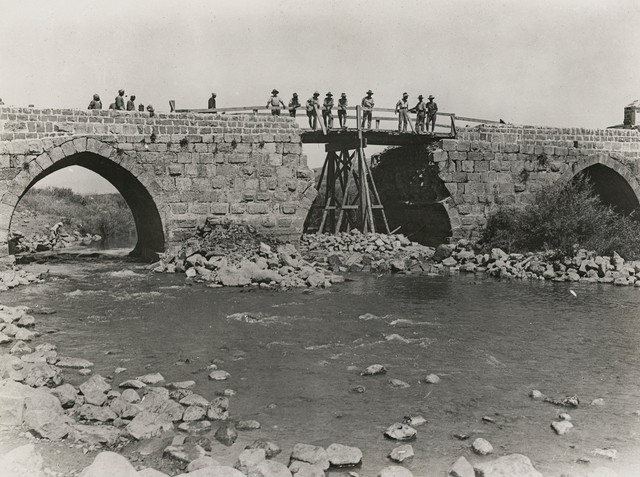
Jisr Benat Yakub repaired (September 1918)

During the Sinai and Palestine Campaign of World War I, Australian sappers repaired a bridge at the historic crossing of the Jordan River at Jisr Benat Yakub (also known as Jacob's Ford). Here the retreating Ottoman and German rearguard had blown up the bridge's central arch, which was repaired in five hours by sappers attached to the Australian Mounted Division. While the light horse brigades forded the river, continuing the Desert Mounted Corps' advance to Damascus, the sappers worked through the night of 27/28 September 1918, to repair the bridge to enable the division's wheeled vehicles and guns to follow on 28 September.

=== Canada ===
In the Canadian Forces, sappers exist both in the regular force and reserve force. The rank of sapper is used instead of private trained to signify completion of the basic Engineer training course. Canadian sappers have been deployed in many major conflicts in recent history including World War I, World War II, the Korean War, and the War in Afghanistan. The roles of a sapper entail: Bridging with the ACROW or Medium Girder Bridge as well as non-standard bridge construction; obstacle and defensive construction; enemy obstacle reduction and clearance, mine warfare; explosive ordnance disposal; water supply using the reverse-osmosis water purification unit; building and maintaining roadways and airfields; combat diving; tactical breaching; and camp construction. Additionally, within the Canadian Combat Engineer trade, there are Armoured Engineer Operators who utilize the Wisent AEV II—a specialized armoured breaching vehicle—for obstacle construction and clearing tasks. Ultimately, the objective of the sappers is to facilitate the living, moving, and to fight for friendly troops on the battlefield and denying the same to enemy forces. The motto of the Canadian Military Engineers is Ubique (Latin: everywhere) a motto shared with the Royal Canadian Artillery.

=== Indian Army ===
The term "sappers", in addition to the connotation of rank of engineer private, is used collectively to informally refer to the Engineer Corps as a whole and also forms part of the informal names of the three combat engineer groups, viz. Madras Sappers, Bengal Sappers and the Bombay Sappers. Each of these groups consist of about twenty battalion-sized engineer regiments and additional company-sized minor engineer units. The three sapper groups are descended from the sapper and miner groups of the East India Company and later the British Indian Army of the British Raj.

=== Israel ===
In the Israel Defense Forces a sapper (in Hebrew: פלס, palas) is the military profession of a combat soldier who went through basic combat engineering training. Most of the sappers are soldiers of the Combat Engineering Corps, but there are also infantry sappers, who are part of the infantry brigades and are organized in engineering companies called פלחה"ן (palchan). These companies are integral part of the infantry brigades. Combat engineering corps sappers are arranged in battalions.

Each sapper goes through high level infantry training, which qualifies him as rifleman 06 (רובאי 06). Combat engineering sappers are qualified as "sapper 06" (פלס 06). They are skilled in infantry combat, basic sabotage, landmine planting and demining, use of explosives, breaching and opening routes, trench warfare, and operating the IDF Puma combat engineering vehicle. Combat engineering commanders are qualified as "sapper 08" while combat engineering officers are qualified as "sapper 11". Both go through additional advance training to gain the skills needed for high level sapper profession.

The Israel Police also maintains a bomb disposal specialist unit. All police sappers must graduate from a 10-month training program at the bomb disposal training center in Beit Shemesh, which includes operational exercises, theoretical studies, and fieldwork.

=== Japan ===
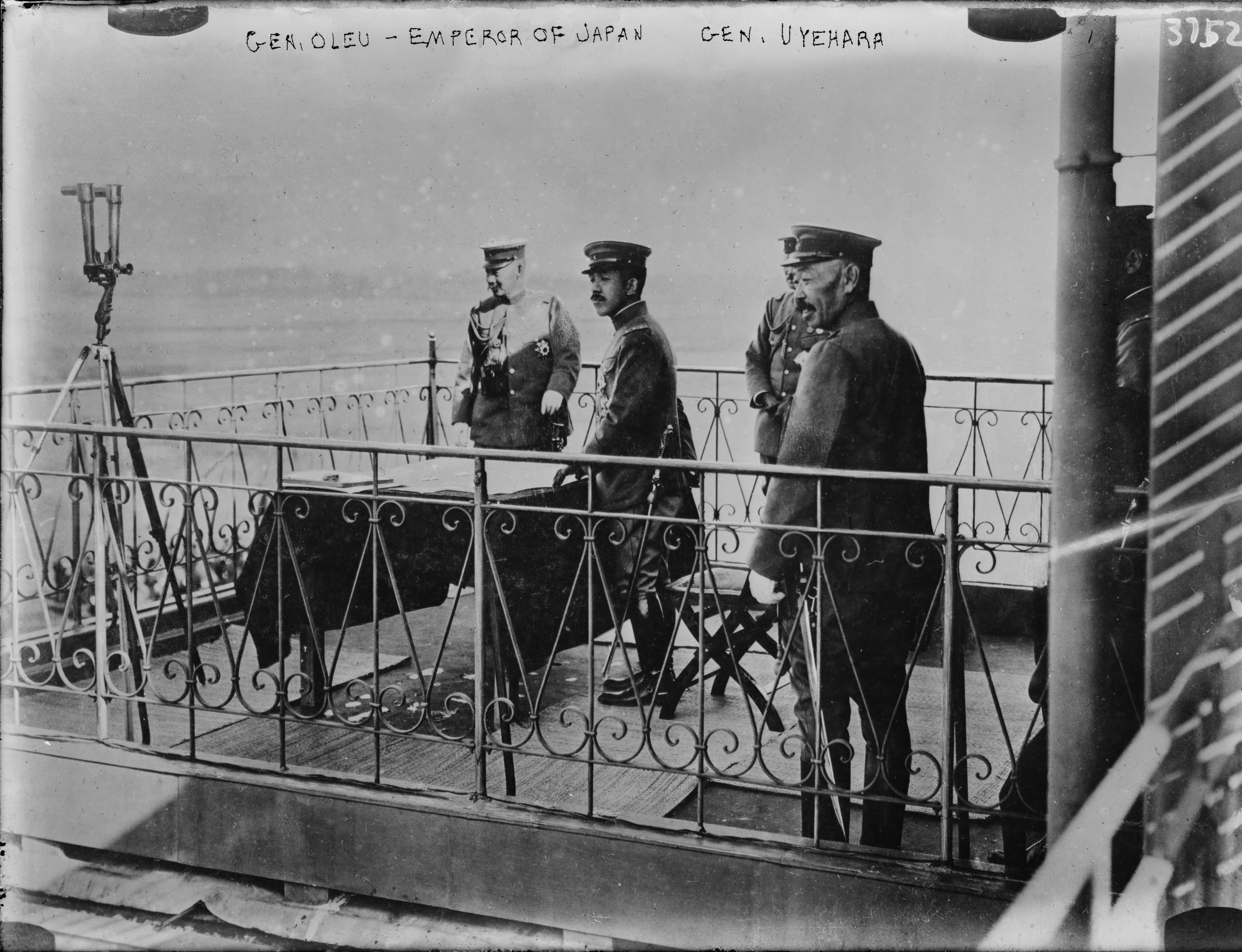
Emperor Taishō and Gen. Uehara in 1915 (Taishō 4).

==== Imperial Japanese Army (IJA) ====
In Japan, Kōhei-ka (工兵科, 工 means "engineer" and 兵 means "soldiers"), or Engineer Branch in English, was a branch (兵科) of the Imperial Japanese Army. General Yūsaku Uehara, who introduced the French sapeur or ingénieur system to IJA and authored the Kōhei Sōten (工兵操典, "Engineers' Manual"), is known as the "father of Japanese Kōhei" ("日本工兵の父").

Engineer Branch officers were considered technology specialists along with Artillery Branch (砲兵科) officers in IJA, except Technical Branch (技術科) officers who have an academic degree in science or engineering and developed military technology.

Selected Engineer and Artillery officers were educated at the Army Artillery and Engineering School (陸軍砲工学校). Artillery and Engineering School's Kōtō-ka (高等科, "Higher Course") was equivalent to the Army War College. Some Kōtōka graduates, like Lt. Gen. Takeo Yasuda, continued their studies as Rikugun Ingai Gakusei (陸軍員外学生) at Imperial University of Tokyo's Engineering Faculty and Science Faculty and obtained degrees. Due to the apparent importance of science and technology, Artillery and Engineering School was renamed Army Science School during World War II and was also studied by non-artillery and non-engineer officers.

Ordinary personnel at Engineer Branch are educated at the Army Engineer School (陸軍工兵学校) and other schools.

==== Japan Ground Self-Defense Force (JGSDF) ====
JGSDF Shisetsu-ka (施設科, "施設" literally means "facilities"), or Engineer Branch in English, is equivalent to the IJA Kōhei-ka. In accordance with the JSDF's nomenclature, this title was devised to avoid the character for 'soldier', which evokes the military.

JGSDF Engineer Branch personnel are educated at JGSDF Engineer School (陸上自衛隊施設学校).

=== France ===
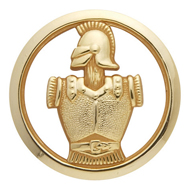
Insignia of French military sappers

In France, sapper (sapeur) is the title of military combat engineers and firefighters, both civil and military, (sapper-fireman or sapeur-pompier). Military sappers fall under the umbrella of the Engineering Arm or Arme du Génie. A related title is pioneer (pionnier), used only in the Foreign Legion.

- Sapper : title of combat engineers in most Engineer Regiments (3rd, 13th, 19th and 31st), except in the Foreign Legion (1st Foreign Engineer Regiment and 2nd Foreign Engineer Regiment)
- Air Sapper (sapeur de l'air) : title of the privates of the 25th Air Engineering Regiment, an Army regiment seconded to the Air Force.
- Parachute Sapper (sapeur parachutiste) : title of the privates of the 17th Parachute Engineer Regiment, the combat engineering unit of the 11th Parachute Brigade
- Marine Sapper (sapeur de marine) : since 2006, title of the privates of the 6th Engineer Regiment, the combat engineering unit of the 9th Light Armoured Marine Brigade.
- Sapper firefighter (sapeur-pompier) : title of the firefighters in the civilian fire services and the Paris Fire Brigade.
- Sapper-miner (sapeur-mineur) : since the Napoleonic Wars, combat engineers specialized in demining.

==== History ====
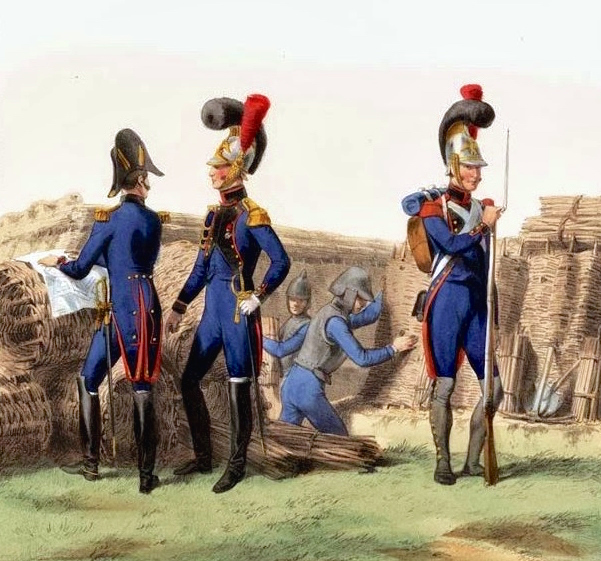
French Imperial Guard sappers, 1810

The French Corps of Engineers was created under the command of Marshal Vauban during the late 17th century. Its members were called sappers if their function was to destroy enemy fortifications by using trenches or sape and miners if they engaged in tunnel warfare or mine. The Corps of the Engineers was suppressed during two short periods (1720-1729 and 1769–1793) and sappers and miners were part of the Artillery regiments. In 1793, the Corps was reorganized into companies of miners and battalions of sappers, each assigned to a particular division.

Eventually, as the missions of the Corps grew more diversified, additional titles were used by combat engineers, such as Conductor (sapeur-conducteur) in 1810, entrusted with the logistics of the Corps, Firefighter (sapeur-pompier) in 1810 or telegraph sapper (sapeur-télégraphiste). In 1814, the companies of miners were integrated into the sapper battalions, themselves organized in Engineers Regiments (régiments du génie). In 1875, the distinction between miners and sappers was abolished and all members of the Corps of Engineers were titled sappers-miners, though only sapper was used in common usage. In 1894, the pontonniers or bridgemakers were transferred from the Artillery Corps to the Engineers, thus creating the title sapeurs-pontonniers. In 1909, the Engineering Arm of the Army Staff was entrusted the burgeoning Air Service (Aérostation militaire), its personal was titled sapper-airman (sapeur-aérostier). The titled was disused in 1914 when the Air Service took its independence from the Engineering Arm.

==== Firefighters ====
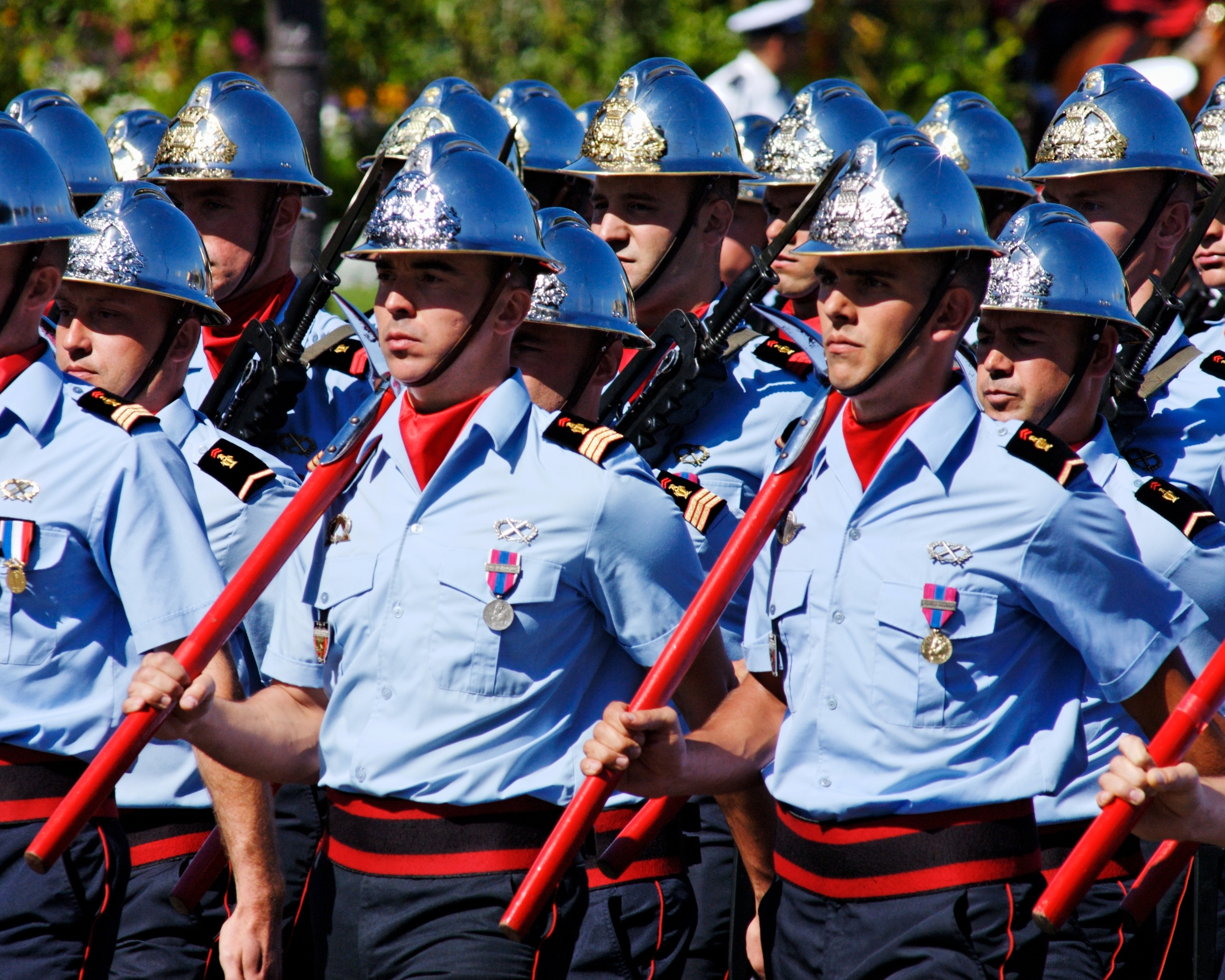
Sapeurs-pompiers de Paris (Paris Fire Brigade) on parade

The first fire company created by Napoléon I was a military sapper company of the French Imperial Guard, created in 1810. This company was tasked with the protection of the Imperial palaces after the tragic fire of the Austrian embassy in Paris on 1 July 1810. The Paris Fire Service (gardes-pompes), a civilian institution, was re-organized as a military unit in September 1811, becoming the Paris Sappers-Firefighters Battalion. Other cities kept or created civilian firefighters services but used the military ranks and organization of the Paris Battalion. In 1831, National Guard engineers companies became the reserve components of the Fire Services and kept their military organization even after the disappearance of the National Guard in 1852. Sapper-firefighter is the common title of the civilian and Paris firefighters in France, but the other military firefighters units, such as the Marseille Naval Fire Battalion, do not use the sapper title, as they had no military engineers lineage.

==== Pioneers ====
Since the 18th century, every grenadier battalion in the French Army had a small unit of pioneers, sometimes called sappers-pioneers (sapeurs-pionniers). They had the mission to advance under enemy fire in order to destroy the obstacles drawn by the enemy and to clear the way for the rest of the infantry. The danger of such missions resulted in pioneers having short life expectancies. Because of this, the army allowed them certain privileges such as the authorization to wear beards. In addition to their beards and axes, they traditionally wear leather aprons and gloves.

The pioneers units disappeared during the mid-20th c. century, their last appearance being the short-lived Pioneers Regiments of 1939–1944, a military public works service using the older draftees in the army. Only the Foreign Legion kept using a pioneer unit, mainly for representation duty. The current pioneer unit of the Legion reintroduced the symbols of the Napoleonic pioneers: the beard, the axe, the leather apron, the crossed-axes insignia, and the leather gloves. If the parades of the Legion are opened by this unit, it is to commemorate the traditional role of the pioneers "opening the way" for the troops. The pioneer unit is made up for parades of selected men taken in both the Infantry and the Engineers regiments of the Legion.

=== Greece ===
In the Hellenic Army, there is the "mechanic" or "Corps of Engineers" (μηχανικό; michaniko).

=== Italy ===
The Italian Army uses the term "Guastatori" for its combat engineers, "Pionieri" for its construction engineers, "Pontieri" for its bridging engineers, and "Ferrovieri" for its railroad engineers.

- 2nd Alpine Engineer Regiment
- 32nd Alpine Engineer Regiment
- 8th Parachute Assault Engineer Regiment

=== Portugal ===
In Portugal, the term "sapper" is used both in the military and in the civilian environment. In the Portuguese Army, a sapador de engenharia (engineering sapper) is a soldier of the engineer branch that has specialized combat engineer training. A sapador de infantaria (infantry sapper) is a soldier of the infantry branch that has a similar training and who usually serves in the combat support sapper platoon of an infantry battalion. A sapador NBQ (NBC sapper) is an engineer branch soldier specialized in nuclear, biological and chemical warfare.

The bombeiros-sapadores ("sapper-firefighters") are the civil municipal professional firefighters that exist in the main cities of the country. The largest unit of this type is the Regimento de Bombeiros Sapadores ("sapper-firefighters regiment") maintained by the Lisbon municipal council. The sapadores florestais (forest sappers) are the professionals maintained by the government, local authorities and large private forestry companies, who cleans and maintain forests and prevents and fights forest fires.

=== Pakistan Army ===
In the Pakistan Army, sapper officers perform combat and normal engineer duties. The Corps is led by the Engineer-in-Chief who is a Lt Gen. The current Engineer-in-Chief is Lt Gen Khalid Asghar. The Frontier Works Organization, Military Engineering Service and the Survey of Pakistan is part of the corps. Initially part of the Indian Corps of Engineers, it dates back to 1780 but came to its modern form in 1947 following the Independence of Pakistan. Since then it has taken part in all wars including 1965 War, 1971 War and Kargil War. It has completed the Pakistan portion of Karakoram Highway. The corps is taking part in Operation Zarb-e-Azb

=== United States Army ===
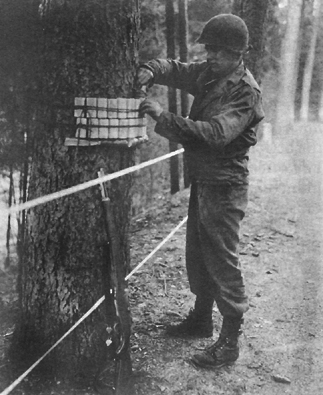
US combat engineer setting a charge in World War II

In the United States Army, sappers are combat engineers who support the front-line infantry, and they have fought in every war in U.S. history. For example, after the Battle of Yorktown, General Washington cited Louis Lebègue Duportail, the chief of engineers, for conduct that afforded "brilliant proofs of his military genius."

Designation as a "sapper" is also earned as an additional proficiency. The U.S. Army authorizes four skill tabs for permanent wear above the unit patch on the left shoulder (Army Regulation 670-1 Chapter 29–13, Sub-Paragraph f). Along with the Sapper Tab, the Special Forces Tab, Ranger Tab, and President's Hundred Tab identify soldiers who have passed a demanding course of military instruction and have demonstrated their competence in particular specialties and skills.

To wear the Sapper Tab, a soldier must graduate from the Sapper Leader Course, which is operated by the U.S. Army Engineer School at Fort Leonard Wood, Missouri. The Sapper Leader Course is a demanding 28-day leadership development course for combat engineers that reinforces critical skills and teaches advanced techniques needed across the army. It is also designed to build esprit de corps by training soldiers in troop-leading procedures, demolitions (conventional and expedient), and mountaineering operations. The course culminates in an intense field-training exercise that reinforces the use of the battle drills and specialized engineer techniques learned throughout the course. The course is open to enlisted soldiers in the grades of E-4 (P) (Army specialists and corporals on the list for promotion to sergeant) through E-7, cadets, and officers O-3 (Captain) and below. The course is primarily for U.S. Army and USMC combat engineers, but may be attended by all service members with an approved waiver.

=== PAVN and Viet Cong ===
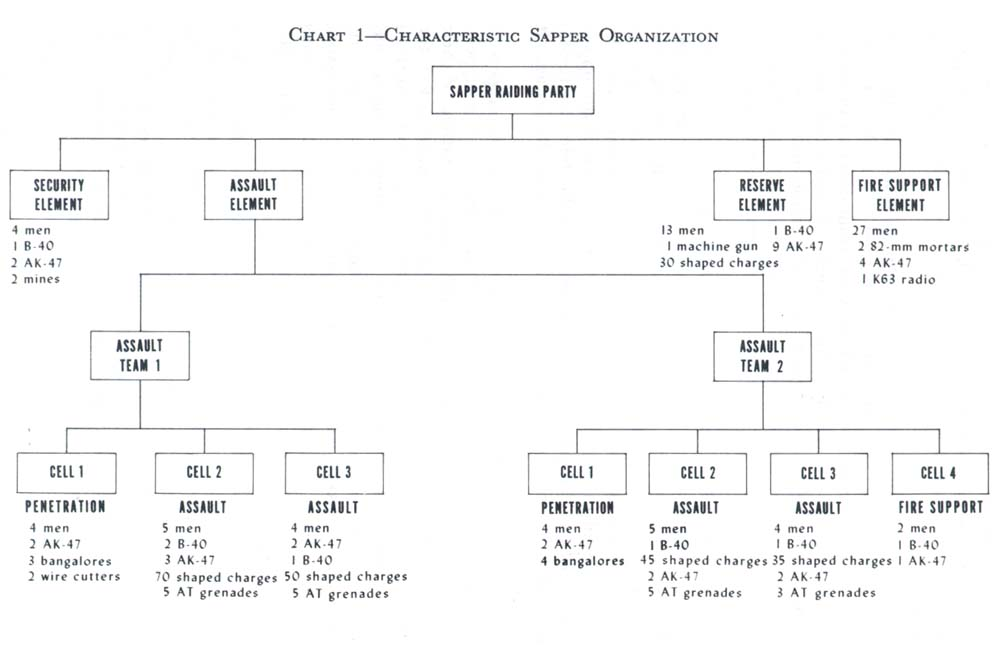
Sapper formation- PAVN/Viet Cong

PAVN (People's Army of Vietnam) and Viet Cong sappers, as they were called by US forces, are better described as commando units. The Vietnamese term đặc công can be literally translated as "special task". Thousands of specially trained elite fighters served in the PAVN and Viet Cong commando–sapper units which were organized as independent formations. While not always successful due to lack of appropriate personal weapon types for combat and assault like other special forces, they were still capable of inflicting heavy damage with their non-firearms arsenal. During the Vietnam War, they were armed with various types of bombs, mines, explosive charges, grenades and even steel-pellet mines which proved especially devastating. These are still the main weapons of the đặc công.

These elite units served as raiders against American/ARVN troops, and infiltrated spearheads during the final Ho Chi Minh Campaign in 1975, where they seized key road and bridge assets, destroyed installations, attacked command and control nodes located deep inside enemy territory, planted explosives on U.S. water craft, and otherwise helped the PAVN's rapid mobile forces advance. A typical PAVN/VC đặc công organization is shown in the diagram. The raiding force was usually grouped into assault teams, each broken down into several 3–5-man assault cells. Overall, there were generally four operational echelons.

An instance of a successful sapper attack conducted by the Viet Cong was the during the Battle of Fire Base Mary Ann. A small number of sappers, through surprise and deft coordination, conducted a successful attack on a superior US force. The battle was described as a "rampage of VC who threw satchels at the command bunker, knifed Americans in their sleep and destroyed all communications equipment.

=== Ottoman Empire ===
The Ottoman Empire had an infantry corp named Lağımcılar Ocağı (literally: Sapper Corps). These infantries were used in most of the Empire's sieges, demolishing enemy fortifications and defences.

== Honors ==
Sapper Island, St. Joseph Channel, Algoma District, Ontario was named in honour of sappers, especially those who graduated from the Royal Military College of Canada. 46°18′56″N 83°57′29″W.

== In fiction ==
In the 1978 song by Australian rock band Cold Chisel, "Khe Sanh", the narrator (a fictional Australian army Vietnam War veteran) says "I left my heart to the sappers round Khe Sanh". However, the only sappers or combat engineers present at the historical Battle of Khe Sanh belonged to US, South Vietnamese and (opposing) North Vietnamese units.

In the 2008 science-fiction novel The Last Colony, a fictitious "sapper field" technology is used to disrupt enemy weapons operation.

== In popular culture ==
Rudyard Kipling's poem "Sappers" (1896) detailed some of the duties of Sappers in the British Army of Victorian times. The notes on this poem further explain the duties referenced.

== See also ==
- Pioneer sergeant
- Assault pioneer
- Trooper (rank)
- Viet Cong and PAVN Sapper attacks
