= Lieutenant general (Pakistan) =

Rank of the Pakistan Army

Lieutenant General
- Insignia with crossed swords and laurel device of a lieutenant general
- Country: Pakistan
- Service branch: Pakistan Army
- Abbreviation: Lt-Gen.
- Rank: Three-star
- NATO rank code: OF-8
- Next higher rank: General
- Next lower rank: Major general
- Equivalent ranks: Vice Admiral (Pakistan Navy); Air marshal (Pakistan Air Force)

Lieutenant General is a three-star army officer rank in the Pakistan Army. It is equivalent to a vice admiral in the Pakistan Navy and an air marshal in the Pakistan Air Force. A lieutenant general is also called a three-star general. Like other armies, this rank is higher than a major general and lower than a full general. There are currently 29 Lieutenant Generals in the Pakistan Army, with each usually presiding over a corps. They serve at various capacities at GHQ as well.

The Pakistan Army has followed the British Army rank system since its independence from the British Empire in 1947. However, the crown in the ranks has been replaced with a star and crescent, which symbolizes the sovereignty of the Government of Pakistan.

== List of serving Lieutenant Generals ==
Sr. No	Name	Appt.	Unit and course of commission	Awards
01	Muhammad Asim Malik	Director General, Inter Services Intelligence (DG ISI) & National Security Advisor (NSA) to the Government of Pakistan	12 Baloch - 80 PMA LC	Hilal-e-Imtiaz (Military) Sword of Honour
02	Inam Haider Malik	Chairman, National Disaster Management Authority (NDMA), Islamabad	1 Engineer Battalion - 80 PMA LC	Hilal-e-Imtiaz (Military)
03	Fayyaz Hussain Shah	Commander, IV Corps, Lahore	4 Sind Regiment - 80 PMA LC	Hilal-e-Imtiaz (Military)
04	Nauman Zakaria	Commander, I Corps, Mangla	11 Cavalry (FF) - 80 PMA LC	Hilal-e-Imtiaz (Military) Sitara-e-Imtiaz
05	Ahsan Gulrez	Commander, II Corps, Multan	9 Frontier Force Regiment (Wilde's) - 80 PMA LC	Hilal-e-Imtiaz (Military)
06	Muhammad Zafar Iqbal	Commander, Army Air Defence Command (AADC), Rawalpindi	127 LOMAD Regt - 80 PMA LC	Hilal-e-Imtiaz (Military)
07	Shahid Imtiaz	Commander, X Corps, Rawalpindi	19 Azad Kashmir Regiment - 22 OTS Course	Hilal-e-Imtiaz (Military)
08	Syed Aamer Raza	Chief of General Staff (CGS), GHQ, Rawalpindi	6 Lancers - 22 OTS Course	Hilal-e-Imtiaz (Military)
09	Muhammad Munir Afsar	Chairman, National Database and Registration Authority (NADRA), Islamabad	39 Punjab Regiment - 81 PMA LC	Hilal-e-Imtiaz (Military)
10	Babar Iftikhar	President, National Defence University, (NDU), Islamabad	6 Lancers - 81 PMA LC	Hilal-e-Imtiaz (Military)
11	Yusuf Jamal	Director General, Strategic Plans Division, (DG SPD), JS HQ, Rawalpindi	35 FF Regiment - 81 PMA LC	Hilal-e-Imtiaz (Military)
12	Kashif Nazir	Engineer in Chief, (E-in-C), GHQ, Rawalpindi	314 Assault Engineers - 81 PMA LC	Hilal-e-Imtiaz (Military)
13	Muhammad Shahbaz Khan	Commander, Army Strategic Force Command (Commander ASFC), Rawalpindi	3 (SP) Medium Regiment Artillery - 82 PMA LC	Hilal-e-Imtiaz (Military) Sword of Honour
14	Rahat Naseem Ahmed Khan	Commander, XII Corps, Quetta	1st Frontier Force Regiment - 82 PMA LC	Hilal-e-Imtiaz (Military)
15	Amer Ahsan Nawaz	Military Secretary (MS), GHQ, Rawalpindi	3 Baloch Regiment - 82 PMA LC	Hilal-e-Imtiaz (Military)
16	Sarfraz Ahmed	Inspector General, Arms (IG Arms), GHQ, Rawalpindi	148 Light AD (SP) Regt (AK) - 82 PMA LC	Hilal-e-Imtiaz (Military)
17	Tahir Hameed Shah	Chairman, Pakistan Ordnance Factories, (POF) Wah Cantt	60 Medium Regiment Artillery - 82 PMA LC	Hilal-e-Imtiaz (Military)
18	Shakir Ullah Khattak	Chairman, Heavy Industries (HIT), Taxila	13 Lancers - 83 PMA LC	Hilal-e-Imtiaz (Military)
19	Muhammad Aqeel	Commander XXXI Corps, Bahawalpur	2 Frontier Force Regiment (Guides) - 83 PMA LC	Hilal-e-Imtiaz (Military)
20	Syed Imdad Hussain Shah	Commander, XXX Corps, Gujranwala	33 Azad Kashmir Regiment - 83 PMA LC	Hilal-e-Imtiaz (Military)
21	Muhammad Avais Dastgir	Commander, V Corps, Karachi	58 Cavalry - 83 PMA LC	Hilal-e-Imtiaz (Military) Sitara-e-Imtiaz
22	Ahmed Sharif Chaudhry	Director General, Inter-Services Public Relations (DG ISPR), GHQ, Rawalpindi	43 Electrical and Mechanical Engineers	Hilal-e-Imtiaz (Military)
23	Omer Ahmed Bokhari	Commander, XI Corps, Peshawar	22 Baloch Regiment - 84 PMA LC	Hilal-e-Imtiaz (Military) Sword of Honour
24	Inayat Hussain	Chief of Logistics Staff (CLS), GHQ, Rawalpindi	2 Frontier Force Regiment (Guides) - 84 PMA LC	Hilal-e-Imtiaz (Military)
25	Tabassum Habib	Director General, Joint Staff (DG JS) at JS HQ, Rawalpindi	Corps of Artillery - 84 PMA LC	Hilal-e-Imtiaz (Military)
26	Muhammad Hassan Khattak	Quarter Master General (QMG), GHQ, Rawalpindi	16 Frontier Force Regiment - 84 PMA LC	Hilal-e-Imtiaz (Military)
27	Azhar Waqas	Adjutant General (AG), GHQ, Rawalpindi	12 Punjab Regiment - 84 PMA LC	Hilal-e-Imtiaz (Military) Imtiazi Sanad
28	Muhammad Aamer Najam	Inspector General, Training & Evaluation (IGT&E), GHQ, Rawalpindi	19 Sind Regiment (Sarbuland) - 84 PMA LC	Hilal-e-Imtiaz (Military)

== List of serving Lieutenant Generals from the Army Medical Corps ==
#	Name	Appt.	Awards
1	Arshad Naseem	Surgeon General / Director General Medical Services (Inter-Services), GHQ	Hilal-e-Imtiaz (Military)
