= Zahid Ali Akbar Khan =

Pakistani general and engineering officer

Lieutenant General Zahid Ali Akbar

Personal details
- Born: Zahid Ali Akbar Khan; 1933 (age 92–93) Jullundur, Punjab, British India
- Relatives: Imran Khan (cousin); Javed Burki (cousin); Haroon Akhtar Khan (Son-in-Law)
- Nickname: Zach
- Military career
- Allegiance: Pakistan
- Branch: Pakistan Army
- Service years: 1950–1990
- Rank: Lieutenant General
- Service number: PA No. 4499
- Unit: Pakistan Army Corps of Engineers
- Commands: DG DESTO; Chairman WAPDA; GOC-in-C X Corps; Eng-in-C, Corps of Engineers; DG Engineering Research Lab
- Conflicts: Indo-Pakistani War of 1965; Indo-Pakistani War of 1971; Siachen conflict
- Awards: Hilal-e-Imtiaz; Sitara-e-Basalat
- Other work: Chairman of PCB

Zahid Ali Akbar (Urdu: زاہد على اكبر; b. 1933) HI(M), SBt, PE, is a former engineering officer in the Pakistan Army Corps of Engineers, known for his role in Pakistan's acquisition of nuclear weapons, and directing the Engineering Research Laboratories (ERL), a top secret research facility developing the clandestine atom bomb project.

His career started in the Corps of Engineers as civil engineer before being posted to conduct the survey of Kahuta where he designed, established and later directed the enormous construction of the research site that was critical in the clandestine development of the atomic bomb program. In addition to his secretive role in the atomic bomb feasibility in the 1970s, he took up charge on collecting military intelligence on the India's nuclear program but later in the 1980s, he was appointed as an Engineer-in-Chief at the Army GHQ. His war appointment also included the command of the X Corps but appointed as Chairman of Water and Power Development Authority (WAPDA) as a secondment in 1984–89. In 1989–90, he then headed the Defence Science and Engineering Organization, and later Chairing the Pakistan Cricket Board (PCB), overseeing the national team winning the Cricket World Cup in 1992.

His role in the Pakistan Atomic Bomb Program remained well hidden until a memoir written by Dr. Abdul Qadeer Khan was released in 2009.

== Early life and career in the military ==
Zahid Ali Akbar Khan was born in Jalandhar, Punjab in British India, in 1933. His grandfather was commissioned in the 7 Haryana Lancers regiment while his father was a well-known lawyer in Jalandhar.

After the partition of India in 1947 that led to the independence of Pakistan from the British Empire, his family eventually moved to Lahore and completed his education from there. Akbar applied and was accepted at the Pakistan Military Academy in Kakul, and decided to attend the Military College of Engineering in Risalpur in 1950 to study engineering.

In 1953, he graduated with bachelor's degree in civil engineering with honours, and was commissioned as 2nd Lt. in the Corps of Engineers of Pakistan Army. Capt. Akbar also attended the Command and Staff College in Quetta, where he qualified and graduated as psc in the 1960s.

His career in the civil engineering spent mostly with the Corps of Engineers, participating in the second war with India in 1965, where Major Akbar led the combat engineering company against the Indian Army.

In 1967, Lieutenant-Colonel Akbar was directed towards joining the National Defence University (NDU), along with then-Lt-Col. Mirza Aslam Beg, and graduated with MSc in War studies in 1971.

In 1973, Col. Akbar was sent to join the University of Engineering and Technology in Lahore, and graduated with the MSc in civil engineering, focusing towards the surveying, in 1975. Upon graduation in 1975, Col. Akbar was appointed to military secretary to then-President Fazl Illahi, and remained in this assignment until 1976 when he was promoted to Brigadier- a field officer rank in the Pakistan Army, only to be posted back at the Corps of Engineers. During this time, he aided to oversee in the matters of civil engineering of the Army GHQ at the vicinity of the JS HQ in Rawalpindi to President Illahi.

== Constructing Kahuta and directing of ERL ==
In 1974, the program on producing the military-grade U^{92} started by the Pakistan Atomic Energy Commission (PAEC) under Munir Ahmad Khan after India announced of conducting of a surprised nuclear test at the Pokhran Test Range, an Indian Army base. Initially, the project was under Sultan Bashiruddin Mahmood, an engineer, who was utilizing the controlled gaseous method at the Air Force Laboratory then-located in the Chaklala Air Force Base. Though, Sultan Bashiruddin Mahmood had been satisfied with the progress in 1975–76, Dr. Abdul Qadeer Khan was less so, eventually became a complaint of the progress and leadership led by Mahmood to Prime Minister Zulfikar Ali Bhutto who also agreed.

Acting on advice from Dr. Abdul Qadeer Khan, Prime Minister Bhutto turned to his army chief General Zia-ul-Haq to find a capable engineering manager. In August 1976, Brig. Akbar had been well known of his involvement in the civil engineering projects with the Pakistan Army, and was approved by then-army chief General Zia-ul-Haq to be part of the clandestine atomic bomb programme. Brig. Akbar was asked with meet with Dr. Abdul Qadeer Khan in this regard, and eventually complained of his military service for military engineering project but understood the nature the new assignment when he was briefed.

Brig. Akbar surveyed the isolated and remote Kahuta Tehsil and decided to construct the national laboratory with Dr. Abdul Qadeer Khan being the chief scientist. A draft report was submitted to then- Defence Secretary Ghulam Ishaq Khan who after conferring with General Ali Nawab authorized the acquiring of the land surveyed by the Corps of Engineers in 1976. Leading the massive construction efforts of building the national laboratory, Brig. Akbar had carefully scrutinized the papers of many civil contractors and had decided to give the contract of some very important buildings to Brig. Mahmoodul Haq Alvi (later Major-General) of the Corps of Engineers.

In 1977, Brig. Akbar became one of the directors at Engineering Research Laboratories (ERL) and worked on interdisciplinary projects with the army engineers from Corps of EME.

On 7 July 1978, Brig. Akbar was temporarily promoted to the two-star rank army general as it was felt that the title "general" would hold more sway with the academic scientists working on the confidential projects. However, upon his promotion, Akbar was transferred away from ERL on martial law administrative duty rather than appointed as Director General at ERL. Similarly in 1979 Akbar was not awarded the prestigious HI(M) medal alongside fellow 2 star General S A Nawab who was also working on the ERL project with Akbar. Eventually, Akbar became in-charge of ERL after he made Lt General and earned his Hilal i Imtiaz (Military) in the 1980s under President General Zia ul Haq. Earlier in his career, he had also worked as a field officer and a civil engineer at ERL. However, to suggest that as a field officer in the Army, with no foreign purchasing experience he was made responsible for establishing ERL in 1974, under Ghulam Ishaq Khan without being given a General officer rank, without a Director General appointment and without being awarded prestigious medals is difficult to imagine.

Brig. Akbar worked extremely closely with PAEC chairman Munir Ahmad Khan to hold discussion on constructing the discuss the weapon-testing laboratories under the control environment, and was said to be extremely impressed with the breadth of Munir Khan's knowledge ranging from engineering to theoretical physics, and Khan's comprehensive understanding of the military affairs in the international politics. After meeting with President Zia-ul-Haq, Brig. Akbar recommended and lobbied for Munir Ahmad Khan's leadership in the program as Brig. Akbar noted to President Zia that Munir Khan had a breadth of knowledge of understanding the military affairs and knew the broad knowledge would be vital in an interdisciplinary project that would involve not just physics, but chemistry, metallurgy, ordnance, mathematics, and engineering, which he found lacking in other civilian scientists.

After the departure of Mubashir Hassan, Major General Akbar formed the committee that was assigned for meeting the needs for the classified projects and to supervise the financial funding, concerning the development of centrifuge facilities at Kahuta.

Major-General Akbar took responsibility of making critical decisions on prioritizing the various methods of gas centrifuges and acquiring raw materials needed by the scientists and engineers. In 1980, Major-General Akbar was promoted to three-star army general, and took over the command of the Pakistan Army Corps of Engineers as its Engineer-in-Chief to deal with senior people whose cooperation was required. Lieutenant general Akbar took the responsibility on operations research for collecting the military intelligence on India's nuclear program, after being aware of Israel's surprised airstrike on the Iraq's working nuclear power plant in 1981. Lieutenant general Akbar worked in close coordination with Air Chief Marshal Anwar Shamim, then-chief of air staff, on securing the national laboratories and nuclear infrastructure in the country.

On foreign affairs, Lieutenant general Akbar assisted President Zia on intelligence matters to deftly neutralized international pressure by tagging Pakistan's atomic bomb programme to the aggressive designs of neighboring India's nuclear program. He met with Munir Khan and Agha Shahi, then-Foreign Minister, drew a five-point proposal as a practical rejoinder to world pressure on Pakistan to sign the Nuclear Proliferation Treaty (NPT)— the points including the renouncing of the use of nuclear weapons.

== Staff and War appointments in Pakistan Army ==
In 1982, Lieutenant general Akbar left his charge as an Eng-in-C of Corps of Engineers, after being shifted as Adjutant-General at the Army GHQ. He left the directorship of ERL that had been renamed KRL in 1981 to honor Dr. Abdul Qadeer Khan

Lieutenant general Akbar oversaw the control over the nuclear infrastructure from military to civilian hands when Pakistan Atomic Energy Commission took control over the program to ensure the safety and prevention of nuclear accidents.

On 31 March 1984, Lieutenant general Akbar was posted as GOC-in-C of the X Corps, working under Lieutenant general Mirza Aslam Beg, then-Chief of General Staff at the Army GHQ. He led the several military operations against the Indian Army on the Siachen when Indian Army seized the control over the glaciers from Pakistan.

Lieutenant general J.D. Khan, his predecessor, gave him a detailed briefing about this operational plan and particularly stressed the importance of intelligence keeping a watch on Indian moves beyond Leh in Indian-controlled Kashmir. He became involved in many operations that were launched under then command of then-Brig. Pervez Musharraf working as his subordinate.

== After the war ==
After the Siachen conflict in 1984, Lieutenant general Akbar was appointed by President Zia as the chairman of Water and Power Development Authority (WAPDA), an energy conglomerate, as a Secondment. During this time, he began cementing influential ties with the civil servants in the civilian bureaucracy, which irked Prime Minister M.K. Junejo.

In 1987, he was in race for the four-star rank appointment and promotion but became involved in a major controversy between President Zia and the Prime Minister M.K. Junejo over the appointment of vice-chief of army staff, the operational command post of the Pakistan Army. Initially, President Zia had appointed Lieutenant general Akbar as vice-army chief over the senior-most Lieutenant general Mirza Aslam Beg, then-GOC-in-C of the XI Corps. However, Prime Minister M.K. Junejo refused to confirm that appointment, insisting on appointing the Lieutenant general Mirza Aslam Beg as vice-army chief on merit.

Eventually, Prime Minister Junejo used his pejorative to elevate Lieutenant general Mirza Aslam Beg as vice-army chief and publicly announced in the news media of promoting Lieutenant general Mirza Aslam Beg to the four-star army general. Prime Minister Junejo directed Lieutenant general Akbar to take over the directorship of the DESTO, which was voided since President Zia kept him as chair of the WAPDA.

In 1988, his appointment secondment to the chairman of WAPDA was later confirmed by confirmed by then-Prime Minister Benazir Bhutto in 1988 In 1989, Lieutenant general Akbar advised Prime Minister Benazir Bhutto of placing the country's civilian nuclear power plants under his energy corporation that would end the international concerns but the request was not implemented despite Prime Minister Benazir Bhutto willingness.

In 1989, Lieutenant general Akbar was posted back at the DESTO, eventually taking over the directorship, where he became involved in classified and sensitive projects of the military. He evaluated the flight performance of the PAC Super Mushshak aircraft that were being designed and built at the Pakistan Aeronautical Complex.

He led DESTO's project in classified black projects to compete with missile gap with India, after the country test firing the short-range missile. His tenure eventually ended when most projects were moved to KRL and SRC, and realized that the postwar military and the civilian governments would not be given any assignment to him and as approaching in importance the one he had held the program in Kahuta. In 1990, he completed his tenure and eventually retired from the military, ending his 40-year long military service.

== Post-retirement: Chairman Pakistan Cricket Board ==
After retiring in 1990 from his military service, Akbar was appointed as chairman of the Pakistan Cricket Board by Prime Minister Nawaz Sharif, and it was during his term when Pakistan reached to the Final to face off with the English Cricket Team, and won the Cricket World Cup in 1992. He sought retirement from his public service, and was eventually succeeded by Nasim Hasan Shah in 1992.

== Suisse Secrets Leaks ==
Akbar was named in the Suisse Secrets leaks in February 2022. The leaked bank records revealed that Akbar had $11.8 million in a Credit Suisse account.

== Autobiography ==
- Journey Through History, Lahore: Ferozsons, 2020.

Government offices
Preceded by Mubaschir Hassan	Science Advisor to the Prime minister Secretariat; 5 July 1977 – 11 March 1983	Succeeded by Munir A. Khan
Preceded by Office created	Director of Engineering Research Laboratories; 31 July 1976 – 11 September 1983	Succeeded by Abdul Qadeer Khan
