= Kashif Nazir =

Pakistani military person

- Alma mater: Pakistan Military Academy
- Military career
- Allegiance: Pakistan
- Branch: Pakistan Army
- Service years: 1990 — present
- Rank: Lieutenant General
- Unit: 314 Assault Engineers
- Commands: Director General C Directorate, ISI; Director General Housing, GHQ; Engineer-in-Chief (Pakistan Army)
- Awards: Hilal-i-Imtiaz

Kashif Nazir, HI(M) is a three star general of the Pakistan Army who is the incumbent Engineer-in-Chief, posted at GHQ.

== Military career ==
Nazir was commissioned in the 81 PMA Long Course in Pakistan Army Corps of Engineers. As a major general, Nazir was appointed as the Director General Housing (DG-H) at the General Headquarters (GHQ). Later, Kashif Nazir served as the Director General Counter-Intelligence (DG-C) Directorate of the Inter-Services Intelligence. He was awarded with Hilal-i-Imtiaz for his service from the then President of Pakistan Arif Alvi.

In October 2022, he was promoted to the rank of lieutenant general. Upon his promotion, he assumed the office of Engineer-in-Chief.
