= Inam Haider Malik =

General in the Pakistan Army

Inam Haider Malik(r) HI(M)
- Education: Pakistan Military Academy
- Military career
- Allegiance: Pakistan
- Branch: Pakistan Army
- Service years: 1989 — 2026
- Rank: Lieutenant General
- Unit: 1 Engineer Battalion
- Commands: National Disaster Management Authority (NDMA)
- Awards: Hilal-i-Imtiaz (Military)

Inam Haider Malik, HI(M) is a three-star general in the Pakistan Army and currently serves as the Chairman of the National Disaster Management Authority (NDMA) of Pakistan.

== Military career ==
Malik has served in various commands throughout his career. As a brigadier, he commanded an infantry brigade at Balochistan and FATA. Malik was director general works and chief engineer as well.

Upon his promotion to the rank of Lieutenant General, he assumed the office of Chairman NDMA. As chairman, he oversees coordination between civil and military institutions during natural and man-made disasters.
