= Zafar Iqbal (general) =

Pakistan military officer

Commander Army Air Defence Command
- Incumbent
- Assumed office September 2022

Personal details
- Education: Military College Jhelum; Pakistan Military Academy; Command and Staff College Quetta
- Awards: Hilal-i-Imtiaz (Military); Sitara-e-Basalat

Military service
- Allegiance: Pakistan
- Branch/service: Pakistan Army
- Years of service: 1989–2026
- Rank: Lieutenant General
- Unit: 127 Light Air Defence
- Commands: Army Air Defence Command

Muhammad Zafar Iqbal, HI(M) SBt is a retired-three star general of the Pakistan Army, currently serving as the special assistant to the prime minister on energy. He previously served as the commander of the Army Air Defence Command.

== Education ==
Iqbal completed his education from Military College Jhelum, where he is also serving as Vice Chairman of its secretariat. Later he was commissioned in the 80th PMA Long Course.

== Military career ==
Iqbal was commissioned into the Pakistan Army in 1989. He has held various command and staff appointments during his career. He was promoted to the rank of major general in March 2018, and later served as GOC of an Air Defence Division in Karachi and an Infantry Division in Sialkot.

In September 2022, he was appointed as the National Coordinator of the National Flood Response and Coordination Centre (NFRCC).

In October 2022, his rank was elevated to Lieutenant general. Following the promotion, he was appointed as the Commander of the Army Air Defence Command, based in Chaklala, Rawalpindi. He is recipient of the Hilal-i-Imtiaz and was awarded the Sitara-e-Basalat following his engagement in the 2025 India–Pakistan conflict.

== Post-retirement ==
On 14 October 2026, Prime Minister Shehbaz Sharif appointed Iqbal as special assistant to the prime minister on energy, with the status of minister of state, to oversee the affairs of the power and petroleum divisions of the Ministry of Energy.
