= Shahbaz Khan (general) =

Pakistani general

Commander Army Strategic Forces Command
- Incumbent
- Assumed office December 2022
- Preceded by: Lt. Gen. Muhammad Ali

Personal details
- Education: Pakistan Military Academy; Command and Staff College, Quetta
- Awards: Hilal-i-Imtiaz; Sword of Honour

Military service
- Allegiance: Pakistan Army
- Branch/service: Pakistan Army
- Years of service: 1990 — present
- Rank: Lieutenant General
- Unit: 3 (SP) Medium Regiment Artillery

Muhammad Shahbaz Khan is a three star general of the Pakistan Army, who is incumbent commander of the Army Strategic Forces Command.

== Military career ==
Shehbaz was commissioned in the 82nd PMA Long Course and he is recipient of the Sword of Honour. In June 2018, Shehbaz was promoted to the rank of Major general.

On 2 December 2022, Shehbaz's rank was elevated to Lieutenant General and he assumed the office of Commander ASFC.
