= Military Engineer Services (Pakistan) =

Pakistani military organisation

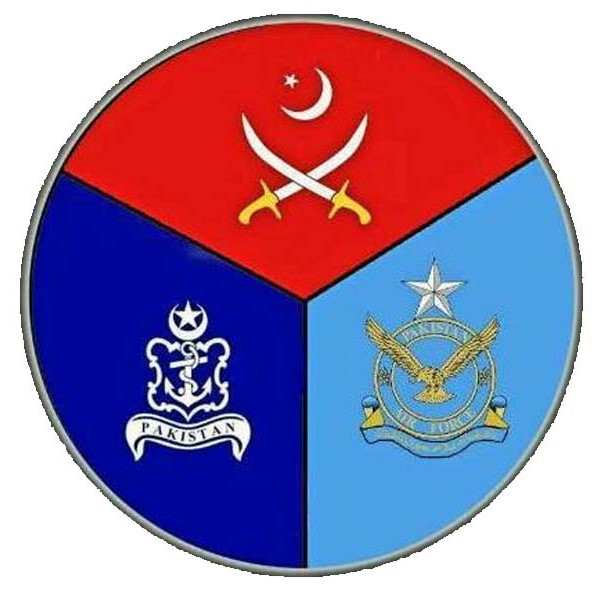
- Abbreviation: MES
- Formation: 1850s
- Founder: British Raj
- Type: Government organization
- Purpose: Military Construction, Maintenance and Preservation
- Headquarters: Rawalpindi
- Location: Pakistan
- Official language: Urdu, English
- Engineer in Chief: Lieutenent General Kashif Nazir
- Director Works & Chief Engineer (Army): Colonel Mansoor Mustafa
- Parent organization: Pakistan Armed Forces
- Affiliations: Ministry of Defence
- Website: www.mes.gov.pk
- Formerly called: Public Works Department (till 1899); Military Works Services (till 1923)

Military Engineer Services (Urdu: ایم ای ایس, "MES") is an inter-service organization of the Ministry of Defence responsible primarily for engineering and construction services for the Pakistan Armed Forces, including the Army, Navy, Airforce and the Ministry of Defense Production. Furthermore, it is involved in complex construction projects including hospitals, buildings, workshops, roads etc.

== History ==
The organization's roots traces back to the 19th century with the foundation of the British Indian Army, a Public Works Department was established in the mid-1850s to oversee engineering and construction works while under the control of the Military Board and manned by personnel from the Engineering Corps. It had three branches, Military Works Branch and Civil Works Branch. In 1899, the organization was renamed as Military Works Services and placed under direct command of the Director General Military Works (DGMW). It was finally termed to its current name in 1923. By this time, the organization of the Engineer-in-Chief for British India was based on the workload of the MES. It was divided into four regional commands:-

1. Northern Command (Headquarters at Rawalpindi)
2. Central Command (Headquarters at Agra)
3. Southern Command (Headquarters at Poona)
4. Eastern Command (Headquarters at Calcutta)

After Independence of Pakistan in 1947, the armed forces reconstitution committee divided the former British Indian Armed Forces which resulted with Pakistan receiving most of Northern Command as part of its share. Between 1958 and 1960, the Military Engineering Services saw notable restructuring with its sub-branches being established after approval by the Ministry of Defense.

== Known projects ==
In 2023, the MES under the supervision of Alternative Energy Development Board (AEDB) initiated a major power project for the military cantonments in Pakistan. The project which has been approved by the Government of Pakistan, National Electric Power Regulatory Authority (NEPRA), and the State Bank of Pakistan (SBP) will include collaboration with private companies including Nizam Energy, Solis Energy Solutions, and Foundation Solar Energy for the construction of solar power plants in order to shift energy dependence of cantonments from expensive sources to cheap renewable energy.

== See also ==
- Frontier Works Organization
