= Aamer Najam =

Senior officer in the Pakistan Army

Lieutenant General Muhammad Aamer Najam HI(M)
- Education: Pakistan Military Academy
- Military career
- Allegiance: Pakistan
- Branch: Pakistan Army
- Service years: 1991 — present
- Rank: Lieutenant General
- Unit: 19th Sindh Regiment
- Commands: President National Defence University (Pakistan); IG Training & Evaluation (IGT&E) Corp Commander, II Corps, Multan
- Awards: Hilal-e-Imtiaz (Military)

Muhammad Aamer Najam, HI(M) is a senior officer in the Pakistan Army, currently serving as the Corps Commander Multan Corps, he previously served as the Inspector General, Training & Evaluation (IGT&E) at the General Headquarters (GHQ) in Rawalpindi.

== Military career ==
Najam was commissioned into the Pakistan Army through the 84th PMA Long Course and joined the 19th Sindh Regiment.

Najam served as Chief Instructor at the National Defence University (NDU). After his promotion to Lieutenant General in November 2024, he was appointed as the President of NDU.

In January 2025, he was appointed as the Inspector General Training & Evaluation (IGT&E), replacing Fayyaz Hussain Shah.
