= Tabassum Habib =

Pakistani general

- Alma mater: Pakistan Military Academy; Command and Staff College Quetta; King's College London; Harvard Kennedy School; National Defence University Islamabad
- Military career
- Allegiance: Pakistan
- Branch: Pakistan Army
- Service years: 1991 — present
- Rank: Lieutenant General
- Unit: Pakistan Army Corps of Artillery
- Commands: Director General Joint Staff Headquarters, JSHQ; Director General Special Investment Facilitation Council; Director General Perspective Planning Cell (PPC); GOC 14th Infantry Division, Okara; Director Military Intelligence(MI)
- Awards: Hilal-i-Imtiaz (Military)

Tabassum Habib is a three-star general in the Pakistan Army, currently serving as the Director General of the Joint Staff Headquarters (JSHQ).

== Early life and education ==
Tabassum Habib was commissioned in the Pakistan Army through Pakistan Military Academy's 84th Long Course in 1991.Habib is a graduate of the Command and Staff College Quetta, National Defence University, Islamabad and King's College London. Additionally, he is an alumnus of the Kennedy School at Harvard University.

== Military career ==
Habib was commissioned in the 84th PMA Long Course in the Pakistan Army Corps of Artillery.

Habib was promoted to the rank of Major General in 2019. He also Held the position of Director in the Military Intelligence Directorate and served on the faculty of the Command & Staff College and the National Defence University, Pakistan.

Habib participated in a United Nations peacekeeping mission in Bosnia. In 2022, he was awarded Hilal-i-Imtiaz for his service.

Habib served as the Director General of Perspective Planning at GHQ, where he was responsible for long-term strategic planning for the Pakistan Army.

Habib has also served as the General Officer Commanding (GOC) of 14th Infantry Division, Okara.

In June 2023, Habib was appointed as the first Director General of the Special Investment Facilitation Council (SIFC), an initiative aimed at attracting and facilitating investment in Pakistan.

In November 2024, Habib was promoted to the rank of Lieutenant General and appointed as the Director General of the Joint Staff Headquarters.
