= Muhammad Aqeel =

Pakistani military person

- Education: Pakistan Military Academy
- Military career
- Allegiance: Pakistan
- Branch: Pakistan Army
- Service years: 1991 – present
- Rank: Lieutenant General
- Unit: Guides Infantry
- Awards: Hilal-i-Imtiaz

Muhammad Aqeel is a serving three star general of the Pakistan Army, who is the incumbent Commander of the XXXI Corps, assigned at Bahawalpur.

== Military career ==
Aqeel was commissioned into the Guides Infantry through 83rd PMA Long Course.

Aqeel has held numerous appointments throughout his career. As a three star general, he served as Inspector General Communication and Information Technology. Following the retirement of Saqib Mahmood Malik, he assumed the command of XXXI Corps, one of the major formations of the army.

Aqeel has been awarded the Hilal-i-Imtiaz (military), Pakistan's second highest peacetime military award.
