= Army Air Defence Command (Pakistan) =

Pakistan Army's air defence formation

- Badge of Air Defence Command
- Active: 1987; 39 years ago
- Country: Pakistan
- Allegiance: Pakistan Army
- Type: Corps
- Role: Air and missile defence
- HQ/Garrison: Chaklala Cantonment, Punjab in Pakistan
- Decorations: Military Decorations of Pakistan military

Commanders
- Commander: Lt-Gen. Mohammad Zafar Iqbal
- Notable commanders: Gen. Ehsan-ul-Haq; Lt-Gen. Ashraf Saleem

The Pakistan Army Air Defence Command (acronym: AAD) is a military formation of Pakistan Army formed in 1999 with a mission of providing the country with air and missile defence.

It is currently headquartered in Chaklala Cantonment, and commanded by Lieutenant-General Mohammad Zafar Iqbal as its commander.

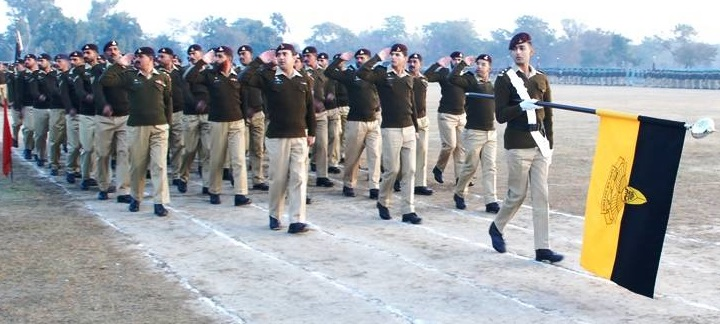
A parade of Army Air Defence

== Overview ==
=== Formation and war service ===
The Air Defence Command was organized and formed in 1987 to address the Indian Army and Indian Air Force's missile threats; it has a sole mission of providing the country with effective missile and aerial defence from the approaching enemies. Its size is difficult to estimate but its support comes from the Pakistan army's Air Defence Corps that provides the administration and follows the field manuals of the Regiment of Artillery.

The Air Defence Command is stationed in North–South region of the country—one tasked with air defence of the northern region of Pakistan headquartered in Chaklala and the other with the southern region commanded from Karachi.

== See also ==
- Pakistan Army Air Defence Corps
