= Engineer-in-Chief (Pakistan Army) =

Chief topographer and engineer of the Pakistan Army

'Engineer-in-Chief or E-in-C', is a Colonel Commandant of the Pakistan Army Corps of Engineers, Frontier Works Organisation and the Military Engineering Services of Pakistan. In the Pakistan Army, the Engineer-in-Chief is a chief engineer and topographer of the Army and currently holds the rank of Lieutenant General, advises the Pakistan Army in matters of science, engineering, and technology.

Lt Gen Imtinan Babar is current E-in-C of Pakistan Army Corps of Engineers, Military Engineering Service, and Frontier Works Organisation.

The Engineer-in-Chief commands the Corps of Engineers, Pakistan Army and other military engineering and maintenance corps of the Army. As a senior commander and senior staff officer at the Army General Headquarters (GHQ), the Engineer-in-Chief advises the Army on science and engineering matters and serves as the Army's topographer.

The E-in-C also serves as the proponent for real estate and other science and engineering programs of the Army. As commander of the Pakistan Army Corps of Engineers, the Engineer-in-Chief leads a major Army Engineering command in civil and military infrastructure programs. This office defines policy and guidance and plans direction for the organizations within the Corps.

Equivalency
Rank	Lieutenant General (3-Star)
NATO Equivalent	OF-8
Uniform Insignia

== Rank Structure and Uniform Insignia ==
Pakistani Officer Ranks
Rank	Field Marshal (5-Star)	General (4-Star)	Lieutenant General (3-Star)	Major General (2-Star)	Brigadier General (1-Star)	Colonel	Lieutenant Colonel	Major	Captain	Lieutenant	2nd Lieutenant
NATO Equivalent	OF-10	OF-9	OF-8	OF-7	OF-6	OF-5	OF-4	OF-3	OF-2	OF-1	OF-1
Uniform Insignia

Pakistani Junior Commissioned Officer (JCO) and Enlisted Ranks
Rank	Subedar Major (JCO)	Subedar (JCO)	Naib Subedar (JCO)	Battalion Havildar Major	Battalion Quartermaster Havildar	Company Havildar Major	Company Quartermaster Havildar	Havildar	Naik	Lance Naik	Jawan
NATO Equivalent	None	None	None	OR-9	OR-8	OR-8	OR-7	OR-5/6	OR-4	OR-3	OR-1/2
Uniform Insignia											No Insignia

== Notable Engineers-in-Chief ==
- Lieutenant-General Muhammad Anwar Khan
- Major General Saad Tarique, 1972-1974
- Lieutenant-General Zahid Ali Akbar Khan
- Lieutenant-General Javed Nasir, 1991-1992
- Lieutenant General Ziauddin Butt
- Lieutenant General Shahid Niaz, HI(M)
- Lieutenant General Asif Ali
- Lieutenant General Khalid Asghar
- Lieutenant General Muhammad Afsar
- Major General Muhammad Ajmal Iqbal
- Lieutenant General MOAZZAM EJAZ
- Lieutenant General CH Muhammad AFZAL
- Lieutenant General Jehangir Nasrullah
