= Pakistan Army Corps of Engineers =

Pakistan army staff corps for public & construction works

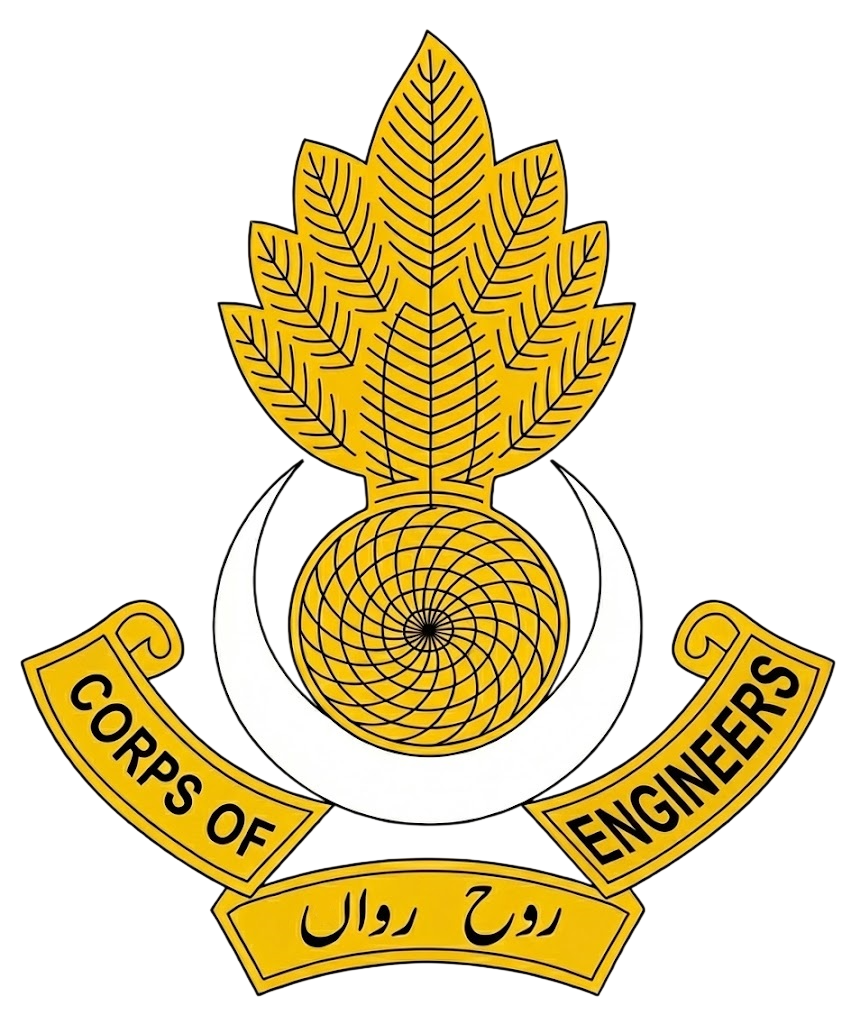
- Insignia of Engineers Corps
- Founded: 1947; 79 years ago
- Country: Pakistan
- Branch: Pakistan Army
- Type: Combat service support
- Role: Administrative and staffing oversight of combat engineering.
- Size: 34 battalions
- HQ/Garrison: Army GHQ, Rawalpindi-46100, Punjab in Pakistan.
- Nickname: SAPPERS
- Mottos: Urdu: روحِ رواں "The Moving Spirit"
- Colors identification
- Engagements/Civil Operations: See list: Indo-Pakistani Wars and Conflicts; First Kashmir War (1947–1948); 1965 Rann of Kutch skirmishes; Second Kashmir War (1965); 1971 Bangladesh Liberation War; Indo-Pakistani War of 1971; Siachen conflict (1984–2003); 1999 Kargil War; War in North-West Pakistan; Operation Sherdil; Operation Black Thunderstorm; Second Battle of Swat; Operation Rah-e-Nijat United Nations/NATO Missions; Yugoslav Wars; Bosnian War Civil Engineering Projects / Humanitarian Relief Efforts; 2005 Kashmir earthquake response; 2010 Attabad Lake disaster response
- Website: Pakistan Army − Engineers

Commanders
- Engineer-in-Chief: Lt-Gen. Kashif Nazir
- Notable commanders: Lt-Gen. Aftab Ahmad Khan; Lt-Gen. Bakhtiar Rana; Lt-Gen. Gul Hassan Khan; Lt.Gen; Maj Gen Saad Tarique Zahid Ali Akbar Khan; Lt-Gen. Javed Nasir; Lt-Gen. Anwar Khan

Insignia
- Flag

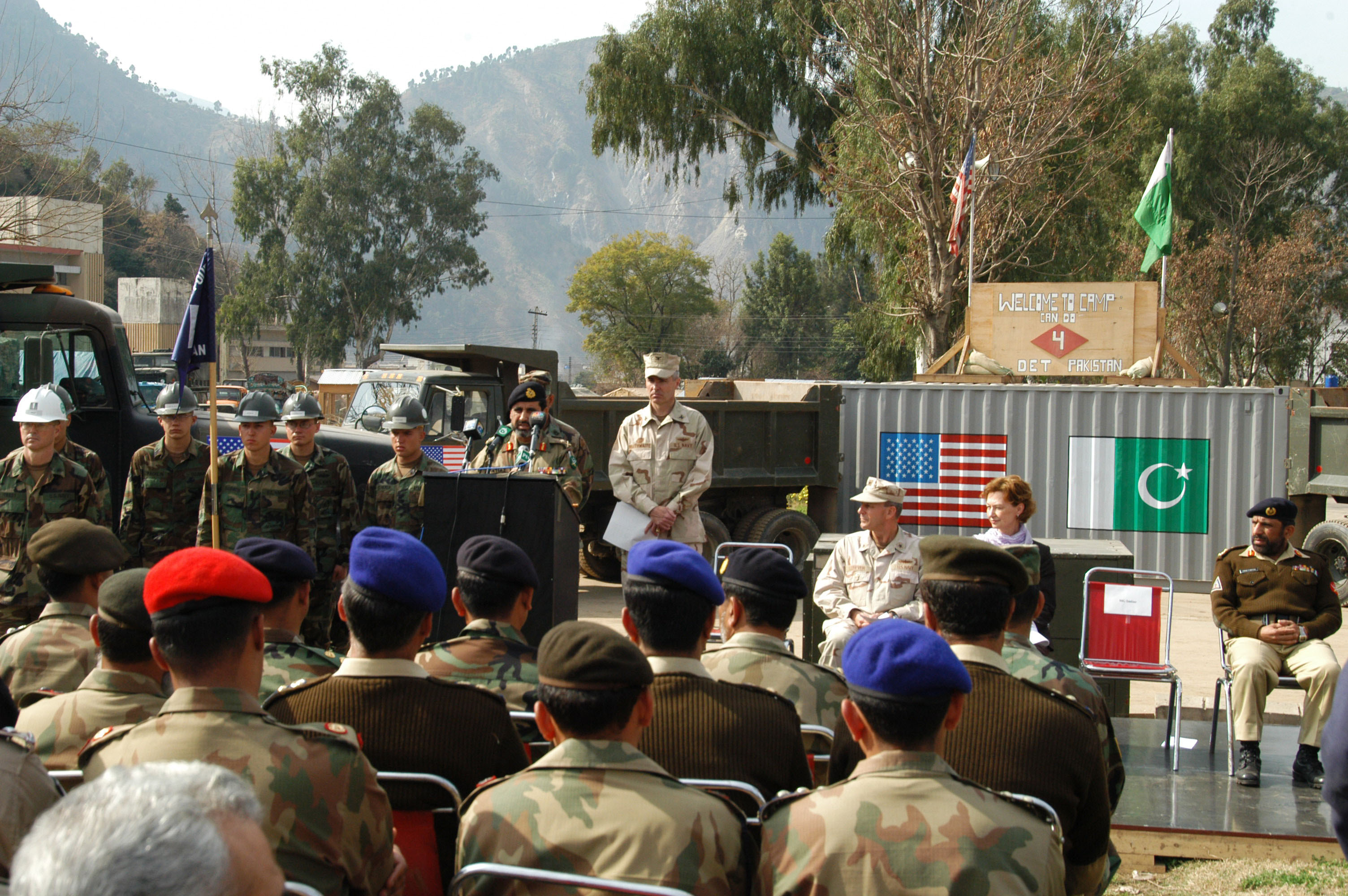
The army engineers with their distinct blue berets attending the briefing on construction support in 2005.

The Pakistan Army Corps of Engineers is a military administrative and the engineering staff branch of the Pakistan Army. The Corps of Engineers is generally associated with the civil engineering works, dams, canals, and flood protection, it performs and leads variety of public works in the country as part of its nation-building mission.

The Corps of Engineer is commanded by the Engineer-in-Chief who acts as an army's chief topographer, and advises the Army GHQ on matters of civil engineering and construction. As of 2023, the current Engineer-in-Chief is Lt-Gen. Kashif Nazir.

== History ==
The engineering arm of the Pakistan Army was commissioned as an administrative branch when it was partitioned from the former British Indian Army's Royal Indian Engineers in 1947. The Bengal and Bombay engineer group laid the foundation of establishing the engineering arm of the Pakistan Army.

From 1947 till 1956, the engineering arm was known as "Royal Pakistan Engineers" since it was under the royal patronage, with many British officers serving in the engineering arm.

In 1956, Royal Pakistan Engineers changed its designation to the Corps of Engineers. From 1947–69, the Corps of Engineers were an instrument for Pakistan Army to engage in building massive infrastructure, dams, canals, roads, and variety of other important public works projects as part of its nation-building mission. The education and training for the personnel to be commissioned in the corps of engineer is provided at the Military College of Engineering (MCE).

The Corps of Engineers is commanded by the Engineer-in-Chief (E-in-C), usually at active-duty three-star rank, Lieutenant-General, who serves as the chief topographer and principle engineer in advising the Army GHQ and the Government of Pakistan on important matters on civil engineering, construction, surveys, and topography.

== Current units ==
1 Engr (Yakta Sappers)

2 Engr (ICHDEIN)(Makran Sappers)(1803)

3 Engr (Behtreen)

4 Engr (Jurrat o Istaklaal)

5 Engr (Laraka Panja)(VC)(King George V's Own)(1799)

6 Engr (The Mighty Six)

7 Engr (Sath Har Dum Sath)

8 Engr

9 Engr (65 Punjabis)

10 Engr

11 Engr (The Builders)

12 Engr (Shaheen)

13 Engr

14 Engr (As Sabiqoon) (Honour dignity pride) (Re builders of NWA)

15 Engr (ISRAA)

16 Engr (Al Muqadim)

18 Engr (Dheshat)

19 Engr (Chaghai Sappers)

20 Engr (Hama Tan Tyar Sappers)

21 Engr (Our Pride)

22 Engr ( An-Nasr )

23 Engr ( Kashmir Sappers)

24 Engr ( Surkhroo)

25 Engr (The Strikers)

26 Engr (Desert Sappers) (1st to Enter in Chumak Glacier, Makran Coastal Highway and Op Zarb e Azab, Best Sports Regt)

35 Lt Br Bn Engr (EL MECHILI)(The ARMOUR Bourne)

45 Engrs Division

55 IND Fd Coy

62 Engr (Allah Ho)

100 Engr

101 Engr (Khunjrabees)

102 Engr (Quaid Sappers)

103 Engr (Allah O Akbar)

104 Engr (The Star Fighter Brigade)

105 Engr (Unthak Sappers)(Skardu 1967)

106 Engr

107 Engr (Tigers of KKH)

108 Engr(Al- Kausar)

109 Engr (Al Azb Sappers)

122 Fd Coy Engr

129 Fd Coy Engr

151 Pioneer Bn

173 Engr (Paka 71)

174 Engr (Pioneers of KKH)

176 Engr (Ek So chehatar Sab Se Behter)

177 BR Engr (The Chronicle of Tayyar Barq Raftar)

313 Assault Engr (Al Badr Sappers)

314 Assault Engineer Battalion (FAL Mugheerat) "By stallions that charge with panting breath, And hooves that spark the fiery death, They raid at dawn with thunderous pace, Stirring dust in wild embrace, They storm into the heart of foe Amid the clash and battle roar."

316 Mechanised Engr

474 Engr

477 ASGE (Army Survey Group Engineers)

479 Bridge Battalion Engineers (Mahidoon Sappers)

495 Engr

516 RDMS Engr Coy(The Blockers)

518 Engr RDMS Engr Coy(The Zone Seizures)

630 EOD (Daring Saviours)

651 Search & EOD Unit

652 Search & EOD Unit( Sher Jawans Paltan)

653 Search & EOD Unit

654 Search & EOD Unit

655 Search & EOD Unit(Sohails Own)

662 Engr (Rekodiq Pioneers) (Ghalib o Kar Afreen)

752 CT Engr

== Public works ==
The Corps of Engineers has been commissioned by the Government of Pakistan to undertake massive civil engineering projects by designing and building the Karakoram Highway which, in 1960s in Pakistan, was the largest public works initiative in the country that connected China and Pakistan across the Himalayas mountain range, through the Khunjerab Pass, at an altitude of 4,693 m or 15,397 ft as confirmed by both SRTM and multiple GPS readings. During the Kashmir earthquake in 2005, the Corps initiated the massive and one of the largest rehabilitation and reconstruction operations in Corps history, rebuilding and redesigning the entire cities of Gilgit and Muzaffarabad as well as Azad Kashmir. Its speedy rehabilitation operation was completed in record time and the entire city was rebuilt in 2008. As more recently, the Corps undertook the intensive rehabilitation and reconstruction operations in deluge in southern parts as well as recent earthquake in Western parts.

Since its inception, the Corps has built extensive military and civilian infrastructure of Pakistan Armed Forces as well as Pakistan Government, ranging from building bridges, dams, military regional headquarters and civil corporate architectural buildings. The Corps mission has been extended with time passes, and is renowned to have designed, construct, and built the GHQ, ammunition plants, regional army headquarters, as well as supporting the nuclear weapons program related national defense's weapons laboratories and its related test sites.
