= Major general (Pakistan) =

Two star rank in the Pakistan Army

- Rank insignia of a major general

- Vehicle star plate of major general
- Country: Pakistan
- Service branch: Pakistan Army
- Abbreviation: Maj Gen
- Rank: Two-star rank
- NATO rank code: OF-7
- Next higher rank: Lieutenant general
- Next lower rank: Brigadier General
- Equivalent ranks: Rear Admiral (Pakistan Navy); Air Vice Marshal (Pakistan Air Force)

Major general is a two star general officer rank, which is the fourth highest active military rank in the Pakistan Army. The rank sits above Brigadier general and below Lieutenant General. The badges of rank have a crossed sword and baton and a star and crescent inside a diamond shape.

== Appointment ==
A major general serves at various capacities in the army.

=== GHQ and Regimental Appointments ===
A major general heads different directorates at the GHQ, such as National Logistics Cell, Military Lands and Cantonments Department and so on. They also serve as the Deputy appointments of Chief of General Staff, DG ISPR, Inspector General Arms and other appointments which are often held by a three star general. He also serves as the Director General of different arms of the army, such as Pakistan Army Infantry Branch and others.

=== Field Appointments ===
A major general commands the Infantry Divisions of the Pakistan Army. He also holds the top rank of Special Security Division, mechanized divisions, armoured divisions and the Force Command Northern Areas. He serves as Commander Logistics Area of different major military divisions such as Karachi, Islamabad and so on. He is seen serving as the senior most appointment of Special Service Group.

=== Paramilitary Appointments ===
A major general serves as the top military appointment of different paramilitary organizations of Pakistan. They also lead the National Guard, Airports Security Force and the Anti-Narcotics Force. The most vital paramilitary appointment is usually considered as Inspector General of the Frontier Corps.

=== Other appointments ===
A major general is also seen serving as the Commandant of military training institutions, such as Pakistan Military Academy and Command and Staff College Quetta and may serve at other appointments at National Defence University. He also commands different directorates of Inter-Services Intelligence. He performs duties as Military Secretary and Private Secretary to Chief of the Army Staff. Often he holds a seat at Ministry of Defence and Ministry of Defence Production.

== Appointments in Medical Corps ==
A major general from Pakistan Army Medical Corps is usually seen commanding CMH Lahore and CMH Rawalpindi. They also serve as head of numerous branches at a CMH.

== List of serving major generals ==
| # | Name | Unit and course of commission | Appt. | Awards | Notes |
|---|---|---|---|---|---|
| 01 | Khurram Anwar Qadri (superseded) | 10 Electrical and Mechanical Engineers Battalion; Integrated Course | Director General, Military Vehicles Research and Development Establishment (DG MVRDE), Rawalpindi | Hilal-e-Imtiaz (Military) | |
| 02 | Kashif Zafar (superseded) | Ordnance Corps; 82 PMA LC | Director General, Procurement Army (DG P – Army), at AG Branch, GHQ, Rawalpindi | Hilal-e-Imtiaz (Military) | |
| 03 | Muhammad Ali Khan (superseded) | 11 Signal Battalion; 82 PMA LC | Signal Officer in Chief (SO in C), at C &IT Branch, GHQ, Rawalpindi | Hilal-e-Imtiaz (Military) | |
| 04 | Amir Naveed Warraich (superseded) | 149 Field Regiment Artillery; 83 PMA LC | Director General, Artillery (DG Arty), at Arms Branch, GHQ, Rawalpindi | Hilal-e-Imtiaz (Military) | |
| 05 | Muhammad Ahsan Khattak (superseded) | 20 Frontier Force Regiment; 83 PMA LC | Director General, Infantry (DG Inf), at Arms Branch, GHQ, Rawalpindi | Hilal-e-Imtiaz (Military) Imtiazi Sanad | |
| 06 | Muhammad Aamir Majeed (superseded) | 29 Azad Kashmir Regiment; 83 PMA LC | Director General, Security (DG Sec) at SPD, Rawalpindi | Hilal-e-Imtiaz (Military) | |
| 07 | Mohammad Ejaz Mirza (superseded) | 7 Field Regiment Artillery; 83 PMA LC | Director General, National Defence Complex (DG NDC), at QMG Branch, GHQ, Rawalpindi | Hilal-e-Imtiaz (Military) | |
| 08 | Zafar Iqbal Marwat (superseded) | 11 Cavalry (FF); 83 PMA LC | Director General, Armoured Corps (DG AC), at Arms Branch, GHQ, Rawalpindi | Hilal-e-Imtiaz (Military) | |
| 09 | Kamal Azfar (superseded) | 662 Engineer Battalion; 84 PMA LC | Surveyor General at Survey of Pakistan (SG at SoP), Islamabad | Hilal-e-Imtiaz (Military) | |
| 10 | Adil Yamin (superseded) | 13 Frontier Force Regiment; 84 PMA LC | Director General, Personnel (DG P), at Dte Gen ISI, Islamabad | Hilal-e-Imtiaz (Military) | |
| 11 | Muhammad Kashif Azad (superseded) | 9 Punjab Regiment; 84 PMA LC | Director General, Commercial (DG C), at POF Wah Cantt. | Hilal-e-Imtiaz (Military) | |
| 12 | Kamran Ahmed Satti (superseded) | Army Services Corps; 84 PMA LC | Director General, Budget (DG B) at LS Branch GHQ, Rawalpindi | Hilal-e-Imtiaz (Military) | |
| 13 | Muhammad Shuja Anwar (superseded) | 61 (SP) Medium Regiment Artillery; 84 PMA LC | Director General, Remount Vetenary & Farms Corps (DG RV &FC), GHQ, Rawalpindi | Hilal-e-Imtiaz (Military) | |
| 14 | Majid Jahangir (superseded) | 9 Punjab Regiment; 84 PMA LC | Commander, Logistics Area (Comd Log Area), Karachi | Hilal-e-Imtiaz (Military) Imtiazi Sanad | |
| 15 | Asif Mahmood Goraya | Army Air Defence; 84 PMA LC | Commandant, School of Army Air Defence (Comdt SAAD), Malir, Karachi | Hilal-e-Imtiaz (Military) | |
| 16 | Akif Iqbal | 37 Punjab Regiment; 84 PMA LC | Director General, Counter-Terrorism (DG CT), at Dte Gen ISI, Islamabad | Hilal-e-Imtiaz (Military) | |
| 17 | Muhammad Irfan | 39 Punjab Regiment; 84 PMA LC | | Hilal-e-Imtiaz (Military) | |
| 18 | Dilawar Khan | 47 Field Regiment Artillery; 84 PMA LC | Director General, Welfare & Rehabilitation Directorate (DG W & R Dte), GHQ, Rawalpindi | Hilal-e-Imtiaz (Military) | |
| 19 | Zafar Iqbal | 106 Ordnance Unit | DG Ordnance Services at OS Directorate, Rawalpindi | Hilal-e-Imtiaz (Military) | |
| 20 | Muhammad Shahbaz Tabassum | Corps of Military Intelligence 82 PMA LC | Director General- X (DG X), at Dte Gen ISI, Islamabad | Hilal-e-Imtiaz (Military) | |
| 21 | Faheem Amer | 8 Cavalry; 84 PMA LC | Ministry of Defence, Islamabad. | Hilal-e-Imtiaz (Military) | |
| 22 | Shahid Manzoor | 2 Field Regiment Artillery; 84 PMA LC | Research and Development Establishment (RDE), GHQ, Rawalpindi | Hilal-e-Imtiaz (Military) | |
| 23 | Adil Rehmani | 25 Frontier Force Regiment; 84 PMA LC | Director General, Sports & Fitness Directorate, at T &E Branch, GHQ, Rawalpindi | Hilal-e-Imtiaz (Military) Tamgha-e-Basalat | |
| 24 | Rashid Mehmood | 29 Cavalry; 84 PMA LC | Commander, Logistics Area (Comd Log Area), Karachi | Hilal-e-Imtiaz (Military) | |
| 25 | Abdul Moeed | 27 Cavalry; 85 PMA LC | Director General, Anti Norcotics Force (DG ANF), at ANF Headquarters, Rawalpindi | Hilal-e-Imtiaz (Military) | |
| 26 | Arshad Mehmood | 153 Medium Regiment Artillery; 85 PMA LC | Director General, Defence Security Force (DG DSF), Rawalpindi | Hilal-e-Imtiaz (Military) | |
| 27 | Muhammad Atif Mansha | 12 Medium Regiment Artillery; 85 PMA LC | Commander, Logistics Area (Comd Log Area), Peshawar | Hilal-e-Imtiaz (Military) | |
| 28 | Javed Dost Chandio | 63 Frontier Force Regiment; 85 PMA LC | Director General, Production (DG P), at POF Wah Cantt. | Hilal-e-Imtiaz (Military) | |
| 29 | Kamran Tabrez Savera | 47 Baloch Regiment; 85 PMA LC | | | |
| 30 | Syed Asif Hussain | 21 Frontier Force Regiment; 85 PMA LC | Deputy Inspector General, Communication &IT (Dy IG C &IT), GHQ, Rawalpindi | Hilal-e-Imtiaz (Military) | |
| 31 | Muhammad Raza Aizad | 15 Baloch Regiment; 86 PMA LC | Director General, Institute of Strategic Studies Research and Analysis (DG ISSRA), at NDU, Islamabad | Hilal-e-Imtiaz (Military) Sword of Honour | |
| 32 | Muhammad Ishaq Khattak | 36 Frontier Force Regiment; 86 PMA LC | Director General, Weapons Development (DG Wpn Dev), at SPD, Rawalpindi | Hilal-e-Imtiaz (Military) | |
| 33 | Chaudhary Amir Ajmal | 45 Baloch Regiment; 86 PMA LC | Vice Chief of General Staff-Alpha (VCGS-A), at GS Branch, GHQ, Rawalpindi | Hilal-e-Imtiaz (Military) | |
| 34 | Jawwad Ahmed Qazi | 4 Baloch Regiment; 86 PMA LC | MLRC, X Corps | Hilal-e-Imtiaz (Military) | |
| 35 | Iftikhar Hassan Chaudhary | 30 (SP) Heavy Regiment Artillery; 86 PMA LC | Commandant, Pakistan Military Academy Kakul (Comdt PMA), Abbottabad | Hilal-e-Imtiaz (Military) | |
| 36 | Ehsan Ali | 55 Baloch Regiment; 86 PMA LC | Additional Secretary, Ministry of Defence Production (AS MoDP), Rawalpindi | Hilal-e-Imtiaz (Military) | |
| 37 | Kamran Nazir Malik | 68 Baloch Regiment; 86 PMA LC | Deputy Quartermaster general at QMG Branch, GHQ, Rawalpindi | Hilal-e-Imtiaz (Military) | |
| 38 | Wajid Aziz | 39 Punjab Regiment; 86 PMA LC | Director General, Military Intelligence (DG MI), at GS Branch, GHQ, Rawalpindi | Hilal-e-Imtiaz (Military) | |
| 39 | Muhammad Umer Bashir | 140 (SP) Medium Regiment Artillery; 86 PMA LC | Vice Chief of General Staff-Bravo (VCGS-B), at GS Branch, GHQ Rawalpindi | Hilal-e-Imtiaz (Military) | |
| 40 | Asad Ur Rehman Cheema | Army Air Defence; 86 PMA LC | Director General, Special Investment Facilitation Council (DG SIFC) at PM Sectt, Islamabad. | Hilal-e-Imtiaz (Military) | |
| 41 | Mushtaq Ali | Regiment of Artillery; 86 PMA LC | MRC | Hilal-e-Imtiaz (Military) | |
| 42 | Imran Ullah | 95 EME Battalion | Director General, Aviation Fleet Management (DG AFM), at LS Branch, GHQ, Rawalpindi | Hilal-e-Imtiaz (Military) | |
| 43 | Ghulam Shabeer Narejo | 12 Baloch Regiment; 87 PMA LC | Director General, Organization and Methods (DG O &M), at AG Branch, GHQ Rawalpindi | Hilal-e-Imtiaz (Military) | |
| 44 | Dr. Khurram Nisar | Electrical and Mechanical Engineers; 75 PMA LC | Director General, Weapons System (DG Wpn Sys), NESCOM, at SPD, Rawalpindi | Hilal-e-Imtiaz (Military) Tamgha-e-Imtiaz (Military) | |
| 45 | Muhammad Irfan Khan | 19 Baloch Regiment; 85 PMA LC | MLRC at T &E Branch, GHQ, Rawalpindi | Hilal-e-Imtiaz (Military) | |
| 46 | Sheharyar Pervez Butt | 57 Cavalry; 85 PMA LC | Director General PDS at Strategic Plans Division (SPD), Rawalpindi | Hilal-e-Imtiaz (Military) Imtiazi Sanad | |
| 47 | Ahmad Bilal | 17 Azad Kashmir Regiment; 86 PMA LC | Director General, Personnel Services (DG PS), Provost Marshall (PM), at GS Branch, GHQ, Rawalpindi | Hilal-e-Imtiaz (Military) | |
| 48 | Muhammad Qaddafi | 20 Azad Kashmir Regiment; 86 PMA LC | Director General, Operations & Plans (DG O & P) at JSHQ, Rawalpindi | Hilal-e-Imtiaz (Military) | |
| 49 | Muhammad Imtanan Babar | 4 Engrs Bn; 87 PMA LC | General Officer Commanding 45 Engineer Division (GOC 45 Engrs Div), Rawalpindi | Hilal-e-Imtiaz (Military) | |
| 50 | Muhammad Farhan Yousaf | 6 Punjab Regiment; 87 PMA LC | Commander, Logistics Area (Comd Log Area), Multan | Hilal-e-Imtiaz (Military) | |
| 51 | Muhammad Asim Khan | 82 SP Medium Regiment Artillery; 87 PMA LC | Member Administration, Pakistan Atomic Energy Commission (PAEC), Islamabad | Hilal-e-Imtiaz (Military) | |
| 52 | Nadeem Yousaf | Army Aviation Corps; 87 PMA LC | Director General, Army Aviation (DG Army Avn), GHQ, Rawalpindi | Hilal-e-Imtiaz (Military) | |
| 53 | Ghulam Muhammad | Corps of Artillery; 87 PMA LC | Director General, Commercial and Open Program (DG C & OP), at SPD, Rawalpindi | Hilal-e-Imtiaz (Military) | |
| 54 | Noor Wali Khan | 15 Baloch Regiment; 87 PMA LC | Additional Secretary, Ministry of Interior, Islamabad. | Hilal-e-Imtiaz (Military) | |
| 55 | Muhammad Naeem Akhter | 30 Azad Kashmir Regiment; 87 PMA LC | Chief Instructor, 'A' Div (CI A Div) at NDU, Islamabad | Hilal-e-Imtiaz (Military) | |
| 56 | Muhammad Nadeem Ashraf | Corps of Artillery; 87 PMA LC | Director General, Weapons & Equipment (DG W &E), at GS Branch, GHQ, Rawalpindi | Hilal-e-Imtiaz (Military) | |
| 57 | Naseem Anwar | 19 Frontier Force Regiment; 87 PMA LC | Commandant Command & Staff College (Comdt C &SC), Quetta | Hilal-e-Imtiaz (Military) | |
| 58 | Muhammad Shahab Aslam | 14 Sind Regiment; 87 PMA LC | Dte Gen ISI, Islamabad | Hilal-e-Imtiaz (Military) | |
| 59 | Umer Ahmed Shah | 2 Signal Battalion; Grad Course | Director General, Special Communication Organization (DG SCO), Rawalpindi | Hilal-e-Imtiaz (Military) | |
| 60 | Muhammad Shahid Siddeeq | 11 Signal Battalion; Grad Course | Director General, Cyber Ops Division, Islamabad | Hilal-e-Imtiaz (Military) | |
| 61 | Abdul Sami | Corps of Engineers; Grad Course | Director General, Frontier Works Organization (DG FWO), Rawalpindi | Hilal-e-Imtiaz (Military) | |
| 62 | Kamal Anwar Chaudhry | 10 Baloch Regiment; 88 PMA LC | Director General, Military Training (DG MT) at T &E Branch, GHQ Rawalpindi | Hilal-e-Imtiaz (Military) Sword of Honour | |
| 63 | Muneer ud Din | 9 Punjab Regiment; 88 PMA LC | Director General, Foreign Military Cooperation (DG FMC), at JSHQ, Rawalpindi | Hilal-e-Imtiaz (Military) | |
| 64 | Farrukh Shahzad Rao | Army Services Corps; 88 PMA LC | Director General, National Logistics Cell (DG NLC), at HQ NLC, Rawalpindi | Hilal-e-Imtiaz (Military) | |
| 65 | Adnan Sarwar Malik | 3 Frontier Force Regiment; 88 PMA LC | Director General, Weapon & Equipment (DG W &E) at SPD, Rawalpindi | Hilal-e-Imtiaz (Military) | |
| 66 | Omar Maqbool | 12th Cavalry (Frontier Force); 88 PMA LC | Director General, Defence Export Promotion Organization (DEPO), Islamabad | Hilal-e-Imtiaz (Military) | |
| 67 | Salman Moin | 14 Baloch Regiment; 88 PMA LC | Director General, Staff Duties (DG SD) at COAS Sectt. GHQ, Rawalpindi | | |
| 68 | Amer Ashfaq Kayani | Army Air Defence; 88 PMA LC | Additional Secretary - I (Army), Ministry of Defence (AS-I MoD), Rawalpindi | | |
| 69 | Malik Amir Muhammad Khan | 6 Frontier Force Regiment; 88 PMA LC | Human Resource Development (HRD) Directorate, GHQ, Rawalpindi | | |
| 70 | Shahid Pervaiz | 9 NLI Regiment; 87 PMA LC | Commander, Logistics Area (Comd Log Area), Gujranwala | Hilal-e-Imtiaz (Military) | |
| 71 | Adeel Haider Minhas | 19 Signal Battalion | Director General, Technical (DG T) at Dte Gen ISI, Islamabad. | Hilal-e-Imtiaz (Military) | |
| 72 | Syed Ali Raza | 28 Signal Battalion | Director General, Command Control Communication Computer and Intelligence (DG C4I), at C &IT Branch, GHQ, Rawalpindi | Hilal-e-Imtiaz (Military) | |
| 73 | Muhammad Yasir Elahi | 314 Assault Engineers | Director General, Engineers (DG Engrs) at Arms Branch, GHQ, Rawalpindi | Hilal-e-Imtiaz (Military) | |
| 74 | Ahsan Waqas Kayani | 5 Baloch Regiment; 88 PMA LC | Commander, Logistics Area (Comd Log Area), Quetta | Hilal-e-Imtiaz (Military) | |
| 75 | Azhar Yasin | 23 Sindh Regiment; 88 PMA LC | General Officer Commanding 17 Infantry Division (GOC 17 Inf Div), Kharian | Hilal-e-Imtiaz (Military) | |
| 76 | Omer Naseem | 5th Horse; 89 PMA LC | Director General, Logistics (DG Log), at LS Branch, GHQ Rawalpindi | Hilal-e-Imtiaz (Military) Sword of Honour | |
| 77 | Syed Abbas Ali | 45 Field Regiment Artillery | General Officer Commanding Strategic Forces South (GOC SFS), Petaro | | |
| 78 | Muhammad Abbas | 172 MBRL Regiment Artillery | Director General, Perspective Planning Cell (DG PPC) at COAS Sectt. GHQ, Rawalpindi | | |
| 79 | Muhammad Shahid Abro | 107 Field Regiment Artillery; 89 PMA LC | Director General, Human Resource Development (DG HRD), at T &E Branch, GHQ, Rawalpindi | | |
| 80 | Luqman Hafeez | 16 Engineers Battalion | Director General, Housing (DG H), at AG Branch, GHQ, Rawalpindi | | |
| 81 | Qaisar Suleman | 39 Punjab Regiment; 88 PMA LC | Additional Secretary, Additional Secretary - IV (Army), Ministry of Defence (AS-IV MoD), Rawalpindi | | |
| 82 | Haroon Ishaq Raja | 5 Azad Kashmir Regiment; 89 PMA LC | Commander, LOG Area, XII Corps, Quetta | | |
| 83 | Aamer Amin | 19 Frontier Force Regiment; 89 PMA LC | Director General, ESA at Strategic Plans Division, JSHQ, Rawalpindi | | |
| 84 | Haroon Hameed Chaudhry | 19 Punjab Regiment; 89 PMA LC | Director General (A), Inter Services Public Relations Directorate GHQ, Rawalpindi | | |
| 85 | Waseem Iftikhar Cheema | 2 Azad Kashmir Regiment; 89 PMA LC | General Officer Commanding 14 Infantry Division (GOC 14 Inf Div), Okara | | |
| 86 | Muhammad Hussain | 9 Sindh Regiment; 89 PMA LC | Director General, Lands (DG L), at AG Branch, GHQ, Rawalpindi | | |
| 87 | Shoaib Bin Akram | 23 Frontier Force Regiment; 89 PMA LC | Director General, Airports Security Force (DG ASF), HQ ASF, Karachi | Tamgha-e-Basalat | |
| 88 | Kashif Khalil | 17 Sindh Regiment; 89 PMA LC | Director General, Doctrine & Evaluation Directorate (DG D&E), GHQ Rawalpindi | Sitara-e-Jurat | |
| 89 | Kashif Abdullah | 31 Punjab Regiment; 89 PMA LC | Director General, Military Operations (DG MO), at General Staff Branch, GHQ, Rawalpindi | Hilal-e-Imtiaz (Military) Sitara-e-Basalat | |
| 90 | Faisal Naseer | Corps of Military Intelligence; 85 PMA LC | Director General, Counter Intelligence (DG CI), at Dte Gen ISI, Islamabad | Hilal-e-Shujaat Tamgha-e-Basalat | |
| 91 | Ahmad Kamal | 41 Supply & Transport Battalion; 89 PMA LC | Director General, Supply & Transport (DG S &T), at LS Branch, GHQ, Rawalpindi | | |
| 92 | Saeed ur Rehman Sarwar | 699 Aviation EME Battalion | Director, School of Interdisciplinary Engineering & Sciences (SINES), at NUST, Islamabad | | |
| 93 | Zulfiqar Ali Bhatty | 32 Cavalry; 90 PMA LC | Director General (B), "Information Operations" Inter Services Public Relations Directorate GHQ, Rawalpindi | | |
| 94 | Ali Iqbal | 6 Lancers; 90 PMA LC | | | |
| 95 | Muhammad Shahzad Khan | 8 Cavalry; 90 PMA LC | Chief Instructor ‘B’ Div (CI (B) Div), NDU, Islamabad | | |
| 96 | Kamran Ahmad | Armoured Corps; 90 PMA LC | VCLS-A, LS Branch | | |
| 97 | Abubakar Shahbaz | 24 Cavalry (FF); 90 PMA LC | Additional Secretary, Ministry of Defence Production, Islamabad. | | |
| 98 | Yasir Nawaz Janjua | Corps of Artillery; 89 PMA LC | General Officer Commanding Strategic Forces North (GOC SFN), Sargodha | Hilal-e-Imtiaz (Military) Tamgha-e-Basalat | |
| 99 | Muhammad Shamraiz Khan | Corps of Artillery; 90 PMA LC | Director General, Pakistan Rangers Sindh (DG PR Sindh), Karachi | | |
| 100 | Imran Arif | Corps of Artillery; 90 PMA LC | Commandant, School of Artillery (Cmdt SoA), Nowshera | Hilal-e-Imtiaz (Military) | |
| 101 | Sajid Amin Awan | 48 Field Regiment Artillery; 90 PMA LC | General Officer Commanding 21 Artillery Division (GOC 21 Arty Div), Pano Aqil | Sword of Honour | |
| 102 | Kamran Saleem | 6 Lt Air Defence; 90 PMA LC | General Officer Commanding 4 Air Defence Division (GOC 4 AD Div), Malir, Karachi | | |
| 103 | Anjum Riaz | 1 Northern Light Infantry; 90 PMA LC | | | |
| 104 | Muhammad Intikhab Alam | 4 Punjab Regiment; 90 PMA LC | General Officer Commanding 23 Infantry Division (GOC 23 Inf Div), Jhelum | | |
| 105 | Shahid Amir Afsar | 39 Punjab Regiment; 90 PMA LC | General Officer Commanding 9 Infantry Division (GOC 9 Inf Div), Kohat | | |
| 106 | Nisar Ul Haq | 17 Frontier Force Regiment; 90 PMA LC | | | |
| 107 | Jawad Riaz | 11 Baloch Regiment; 90 PMA LC | Director General, Pakistan Coast Guards (DG PCG), Karachi | | |
| 108 | Waseem Haider Shah | 8 Baloch Regiment; 90 PMA LC | Director General, Personnel Administration (DG PA), at AG Branch, GHQ, Rawalpindi | | |
| 109 | Naiknam Muhammad Baig | 14 Punjab Regiment; 90 PMA LC | | | |
| 110 | Umar Farid | 45 Punjab Regiment; 90 PMA LC | General Officer Commanding 19 Infantry Division (GOC 19 Inf Div), Mangla | | |
| 111 | Mazhar Nazir | 2 Frontier Force Regiment (Guides); 90 PMA LC | General Officer Commanding 35 Infantry Division (GOC 35 Inf Div), Bahawalpur | | |
| 112 | Muhammad Atif Bin Akram | 6 Punjab Regiment; 90 PMA LC | Director General, Pakistan Rangers Punjab (DG PR Punjab), Lahore | | |
| 113 | Muhammad Imran Khan Babar | 13 Sindh Regiment; 90 PMA LC | General Officer Commanding 15 Infantry Division (GOC 15 Inf Div), Sialkot | Imtiazi Sanad | |
| 114 | Syed Muhammad Jawad Tariq | 14 Frontier Force Regiment; 90 PMA LC | Private Secretary to COAS (PS-C), GHQ Rawalpindi | | |
| 115 | Malik Muhammad Shehzad | Electrical and Mechanical Engineering | Director General, Defence Science & Technology Organisation (DG DESTO), Rawalpindi | | |
| 116 | Naveed Ahmad | Electrical and Mechanical Engineering | Director General, Project Management Organization (DG PMO), Taxila | | |
| 117 | Adnan Sultan | 20 Lancers 91 PMA LC | General Officer Commanding 25 Mechanized Division (GOC 25 Mech Div), Malir, Karachi | | |
| 118 | Usman Farooq Kiyani | 6 Lancers 91 PMA LC | General Officer Commanding 1 Armoured Division (GOC 1 Armd Div), Multan | | |
| 119 | Rao Imran Sartaj | Corps of Artillery 91 PMA LC | Inspector General, Frontier Corps, Khyber Pakhtunkhwa, North (IG FC KP N), Peshawar | | |
| 120 | Yahya Usman Gondal | 44 SP Medium Regiment Artillery 91 PMA LC | General Officer Commanding 18 Infantry Division (GOC 18 Inf Div), Hyderabad | | |
| 121 | Usman Iqbal | 65 Medium Regiment Artillery 91 PMA LC | General Officer Commanding 2 Artillery Division (GOC 2 Arty Div), Gujranwala | | |
| 122 | Julian Moazzam James | 136 RCG AD / 3 Commando Battalion SSG (Powindahs); 92 PMA LC | General Officer Commanding 3 Air Defence Division (GOC 3 AD Div), Sargodha | Tamgha-e-Basalat | |
| 123 | Saeed Anwar | Army Aviation Corps | General Officer Commanding Army Aviation Command (GOC Avn), Rawalpindi | | |
| 124 | Rana Arfan Shakeel Ramay | Corps of Military Intelligence (106 Medium Regiment Artillery) 89 PMA LC | Director General, Bravo (DG B), at Dte Gen ISI, Islamabad | Sitara e Imtiaz | |
| 125 | Attiq Ahmed | Electrical and Mechanical Engineering | Director General, Corps of Electrical and Mechanical Engineers (DG EME), GHQ, Rawalpindi | | |
| 126 | Mehr Omer Khan | 2 Baloch Regiment; 91 PMA | Inspector General, Frontier Corps Khyber Pakhtunkhwa, South (IG FC KP (S), Wana | Sword of Honour | |
| 127 | Syed Imtiaz Hussain Gillani | 19 Punjab Regiment 91 PMA LC | Commander, Force Command Northern Areas (Comd FCNA), Gilgit | | |
| 128 | Ahmad Jawad | 28 Baloch Regiment/ Special Services Group 91 PMA LC | General Officer Commanding Special Services Group (GOC SSG), Tarbela | | |
| 129 | Tajdeed Mumtaz | 30 Baloch Regiment; 91 PMA LC | Military Secretary to the Prime Minister of Pakistan (MS to PM), Islamabad | | |
| 130 | Bilal Sarfaraz | 12 Baloch Regiment; 91 PMA LC | Inspector General, Frontier Corps Balochistan South (IG FC Bln S), Turbat | | |
| 131 | Khurram Shabbir | 35 Azad Kashmir Regiment; 92 PMA LC | MRC at X Corps, Rawalpindi | | |
| 132 | Faisal Saud | 26 Frontier Force 92 PMA LC | | | |
| 133 | Abid Mazhar | 12 Punjab Regiment; 92 PMA LC | Commandant, School of Infantry and Tactics (SI&T), Quetta | | |
| 134 | Shahryar Munir Hafiez | 7 Frontier Force Regiment 92 PMA LC | General Officer Commanding 33rd Infantry Division (GOC 33 Inf Division), Khuzdar | | |
| 135 | Shehryar Qureshi | 5 Baluch Regiment 92 PMA LC | General Officer Commanding 16th Infantry Division (GOC 16 Inf Div), Pano Aqil | | |
| 136 | Adil Iftikhar Warriach | 41 Azad Kashmir Regiment; 92 PMA LC | General Officer Commanding 7 Infantry Division (GOC 7 Inf Div), Miranshah | | |
| 137 | Amjad Aziz Mughal | 39 Punjab Regiment; 92 PMA LC | General Officer Commanding 34 Light Infantry Division (GOC 34 Lt Inf Div), Chilas | | |
| 138 | Zulfikar Shaheen | 3 Punjab Regiment; 92 PMA LC | General Officer Commanding 8 Infantry Division (GOC 8 Inf Div), Sialkot | | |
| 139 | Habib Nawaz | 36 Baloch Regiment; 92 PMA LC | General Officer Commanding 44 Infantry Division (GOC 44 Inf Div), Gawadar | | |
| 140 | Sardar Muhammad Tariq Khan | Armoured Corps 94 PMA LC | General Officer Commanding 6th Armoured Division (Pakistan), Gujranwala. | | |
| 141 | Azat Sajjad Khan | 30 Cavalry 94 PMA LC | Director General, Analysis (DG A), at Dte Gen ISI, Islamabad. | | |
| 142 | Zill-e-Husnain | 14 Field Regiment Artillery | | | |
| 143 | Muhammad Shoaib | Artillery | | | |
| 144 | Saad Al Abd | Corps of Military Intelligence | Director General, H (DG H), at Dte Gen ISI, Islamabad. | | |
| 145 | Muhammad Faisal Ghaffar Rana | NLI | General Officer Commanding, 11th Infantry Division (GOC 11 Inf Div), Lahore | | |
| 146 | Nauman Manzoor Awan | 9 Frontier Force Regiment (Wilde's) | General Officer Commanding, 26th Mechanised Infantry Division (GOC 26 Mech Div), Bahawalpur | | |
| 147 | Muhammad Asim | Baloch | | | |
| 148 | Tauqeer Abbas | Baloch | | | |
| 149 | Asif Aziz Khan | AK | | | |
| 150 | Atif Bashir | FF | General Officer Commanding, 10th Infantry Division (GOC 10 Div), Lahore | | |
| 151 | Zarar Mehmood | FF 94 PMA LC | General Officer Commanding 12th Infantry Division (GOC 12 Inf Div), Murree | | |
| 152 | Mumtaz Ali | Punjab 94 PMA LC | General Officer Commanding 41st Infantry Division (GOC 41 Inf Div), Quetta | | |
| 153 | Ali Ejaz Rafi | 2 Frontier Force Regiment (Guides) | | | |
| 154 | Bilal Mehmood | 9 Punjab Regt 94 PMA LC | General Officer Commanding, 37th Infantry Division (GOC 37 DIV), Kharian | | |
| 155 | Mudasser Saeed | 5 Sindh Regt 94 PMA LC | General Officer Commanding, 40th Infantry Division (GOC 40 Div), Okara | | |
| 156 | Muhammad Atif Mujtaba | 38 Azad Kashmir (HAT) Regiment 94 PMA LC | Inspector General, Frontier Corps Balochistan (N), Quetta | | |
| 157 | Mansoor Nasir | Engineer | Director General, Works & Chief Engineer Army (DG W &CE – A), GHQ Rawalpindi | | |
| 158 | Fahham Bin Sultan | Avn EME | | | |
| 159 | Majid Hussain Bhatti | Ordanance 94 PMA LC | Vice Chief of Logistics Staff A (VCLS-A), at LS Branch, GHQ, Rawalpindi | | |

== List of serving major generals from the Army Medical Corps ==
| # | Name | Appt. | Awards |
|---|---|---|---|
| 01 | Nadeem Fazal | Director General Medicine, Med Dte, GHQ | Hilal-e-Imtiaz (Military) Tamgha-e-Imtiaz (Military) |
| 02 | Nadeem Ahmed Rana | Commandant AFID Rawalpindi | Hilal-e-Imtiaz (Military) |
| 03 | Tahir Masood Ahmad | Director General Surgery, Med Dte, GHQ | Hilal-e-Imtiaz (Military) |
| 04 | Waseem Ahmad Khan | Head of Department Surgery Unit 3 MH, Rawalpindi | Hilal-e-Imtiaz (Military) |
| 05 | Sohail Sabir | Professor of Nephrology, Army Medical College, Rawalpindi | Hilal-e-Imtiaz (Military) |
| 06 | Fuad Siddique | Advisor in (Medicine) / Head of Department (Medicine), Combined Military Hospital (CMH), Rawalpindi | Hilal-e-Imtiaz (Military) |
| 07 | Zeeshan Ahmed | Head of Department Neonatal and Pediatric Intensive Care Unit, CMH Rawalpindi | Hilal-e-Imtiaz (Military) |
| 08 | Sohail Ilyas | Head of Department Surgery Unit 1, CMH, Rawalpindi | Hilal-e-Imtiaz (Military) |
| 09 | Syed Mukarram Hussain | Head of Department Surgery Unit 2, CMH Rawalpindi | Hilal-e-Imtiaz (Military) |
| 10 | Maqbool Raza | Head of Department and Advisor in (ENT), Combined Military Hospital (CMH), Rawalpindi | Tamgha-e-Imtiaz (Military) |
| 11 | Iftikhar Ahmed Satti | Director General Medical Directorate, GHQ | Hilal-e-Imtiaz (Military) |
| 12 | Sibtain Rafique | Director General Med Proc & Stores, Med Dte, GHQ | Hilal-e-Imtiaz (Military) |
| 13 | Ijaz Ahmad | Director General Medical Services (Navy) | Hilal-e-Imtiaz (Military) |
| 14 | Rizwan Sadiq | Inspector General Hospitals, Med Dte, GHQ | Hilal-e-Imtiaz (Military) |
| 15 | Tufail Ahmad | Commandant Combined Military Hospital (CMH), Rawalpindi | |
| 16 | Muhammad Fayyaz Malik | | |
| 17 | Anjum Anwar Qadri | Advisor in Anesthesiology | |
| 18 | Muhammad Rafique | Commandant Armed Forces Post Graduate Medical Institute, Rawalpindi | |
| 19 | Haroon Sabir | Commandant Armed Forces Institute of Urology (AFIU), Rawalpindi | |
| 20 | Farhan Ahmed Majeed | Advisor in Thoracic Surgery | |
| 21 | Khurram Haq Nawaz | Principal Army Medical College, Rawalpindi | |
| 22 | Qamar Husnain Khan | Commandant Military Hospital Rawalpindi | |
| 23 | Muhammad Farid | Commandant Combined Military Hospital Lahore | |
| 24 | Nadeem Paracha | Consultant Oncologist / HOD Oncology, Military Hospital Rawalpindi | |
| 25 | Waqar Muzaffar | Commandant Armed Forces Institute of Ophthalmology, Rawalpindi | |
| 26 | Nasir Ali | Commandant Army Cardiac Hospital (ACH), Lahore | |
| 27 | Muhammad Nadir Khan | Commandant Armed Forces Institute of Cardiology AFIC/ National Institute of Heart Diseases, Rawalpindi | |
