= Nigar Johar =

Pakistani general (born 1965)

Lieutenant-General (R) Nigar Johar HI(M) TI(M)
- نگار جوہر
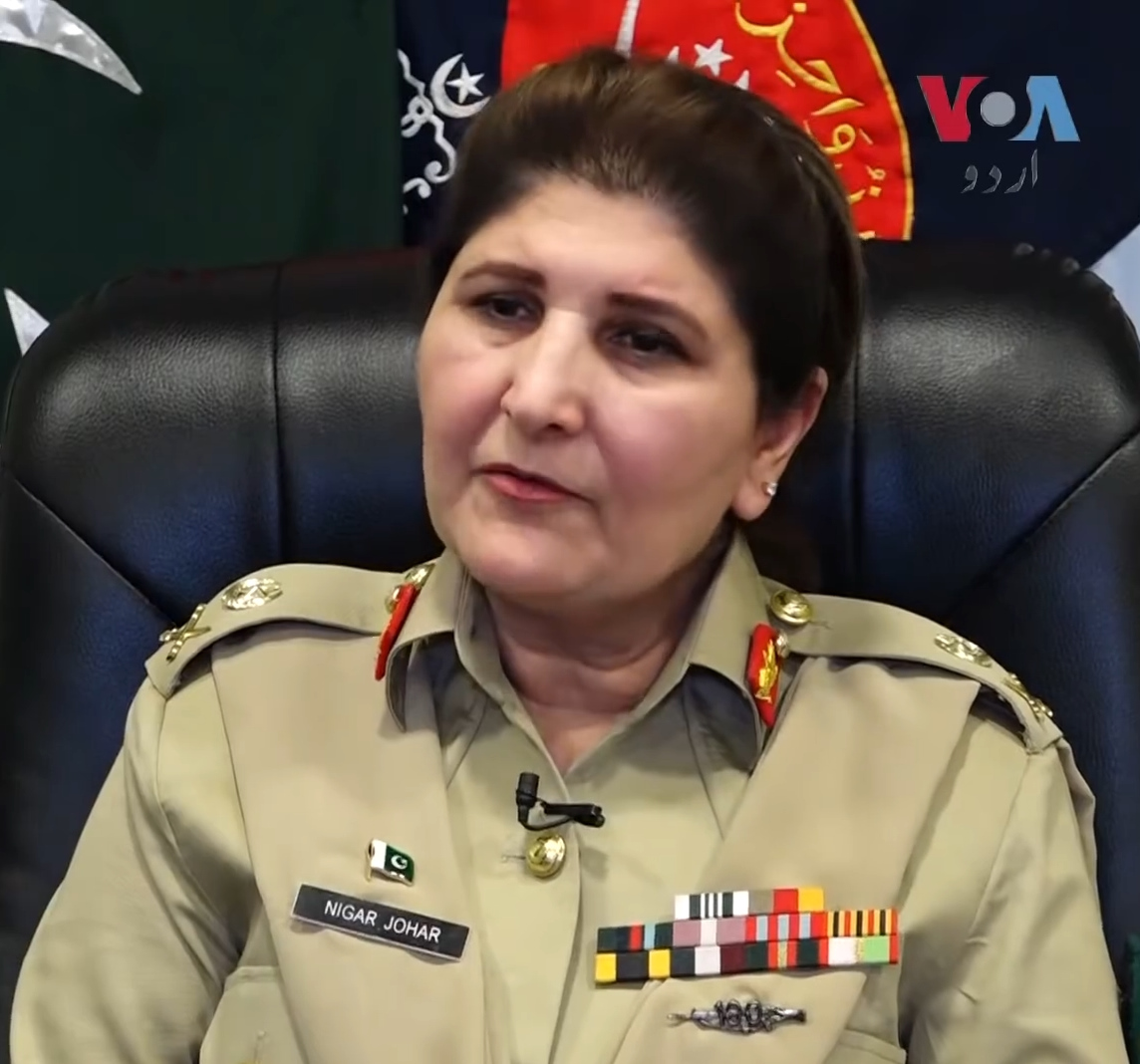

Personal details
- Born: Nigar Johar Khan; 1965 (age 60–61) Swabi, Khyber Pakhtunkhwa
- Spouse: Johar(-2019)
- Education: Presentation Convent Girls High School
- Alma mater: Army Medical College; Armed Forces Post Graduate Medical Institute

Military service
- Allegiance: Pakistan
- Branch/service: Pakistan Army
- Years of service: 1985 – 2022
- Rank: Lieutenant General
- Unit: Pakistan Army Medical Corps
- Commands: Colonel commandant of Army Medical Corps, Pakistan Army; Surgeon Lieutenant, Pakistan Army; Commandant, Military Hospital Rawalpindi; Deputy Commandant, Combined Military Hospital Rawalpindi; Vice Principal, Army Medical College; Commandant Combined Military Hospital Jhelum
- Awards: Hilal-e-Imtiaz (Military); Tamgha-e-Imtiaz (Military)

Nigar Johar HI(M) TI(M) (Urdu: نگار جوہر; born 1965) is a retired three-star general in the Pakistan Army. Nigar is the first and only woman in the history of Pakistan Army to reach the rank of lieutenant-general, and the third to reach the rank of major-general. She belongs to the Pakistan Army Medical Corps and served as the surgeon general of Pakistan Army and Colonel commandant of Army Medical Corps. The other five women major-generals Shahida Badsha, Shahida Malik, Shehla Baqai, Abeera Chaudhry and Shazia Nisar also belong to the Army Medical Corps.

In 2015, she was featured in an Inter-Services Public Relations (ISPR) video honoring women in the Pakistan Armed Forces. At the time, she was the deputy commandant of the Combined Military Hospital (CMH), Rawalpindi.

Nigar Johar is currently serving as the Khyber Pakhtunkhwa government as the health advisor to Governor Faisal Kundi.

== Education and background ==
Born Nigar Qadir (named Johar after marriage) was born in Panjpir village in the Swabi District of Khyber Pakhtunkhwa province to a Pashtun family. Her father, Abdul Qadir, was an army colonel who served in the ISI. Both her parents along with her two younger sisters died in a car accident in 1989. Only her brother survived. Her husband, Johar, an engineer in the military, died in 2019 due to cancer.

Nigar Johar completed her schooling through the Presentation Convent Girls High School, Rawalpindi in 1978. She joined the Army Medical College (AMC) in 1981, graduating in 1985. She is from the 5th MBBS course of the Army Medical College and has served as a female company commander of Ayesha Company at the same college. In 2010, she completed the examination for membership of the College of Physicians and Surgeons Pakistan. In 2012, she completed her diploma in Advance Medical Administration through the Armed Forces Post Graduate Medical Institute and in 2015 received a Master of Public Health degree from the same institute.

== Military career ==
On 30 June 2020 she was promoted to lieutenant general and appointed as Surgeon General of Pakistan Army. In 2015, she was the deputy commandant of the Combined Military Hospital Rawalpindi. On 9 February 2017, Nigar Johar was among the 37 brigadiers who were promoted to the rank of major general. Approval for her promotions was given at an Army Selection Board meeting which was presided over by then Chief of Army Staff General Qamar Javed Bajwa. She served as vice principal of Army Medical College. She also served as the commandant of Pak-Emirates Military Hospital, Rawalpindi. She retired from service in 2022.

== Political career ==
In 2026, following the removal of Chief Minister Sohail Afridi through governor's rule in Khyber Pakhuntkhwa, Nigar Johar was appointed as the health advisor to Governor Faisal Kundi in the province.

== In popular culture ==
Mahira Khan portrayed Nigar in Aik Hai Nigaar, a 2021 Urdu language biographical telefilm about her life. The telefilm was directed by Adnan Sarwar and was premiered on 23 October 2021 on ARY Digital.

== Awards and decorations ==

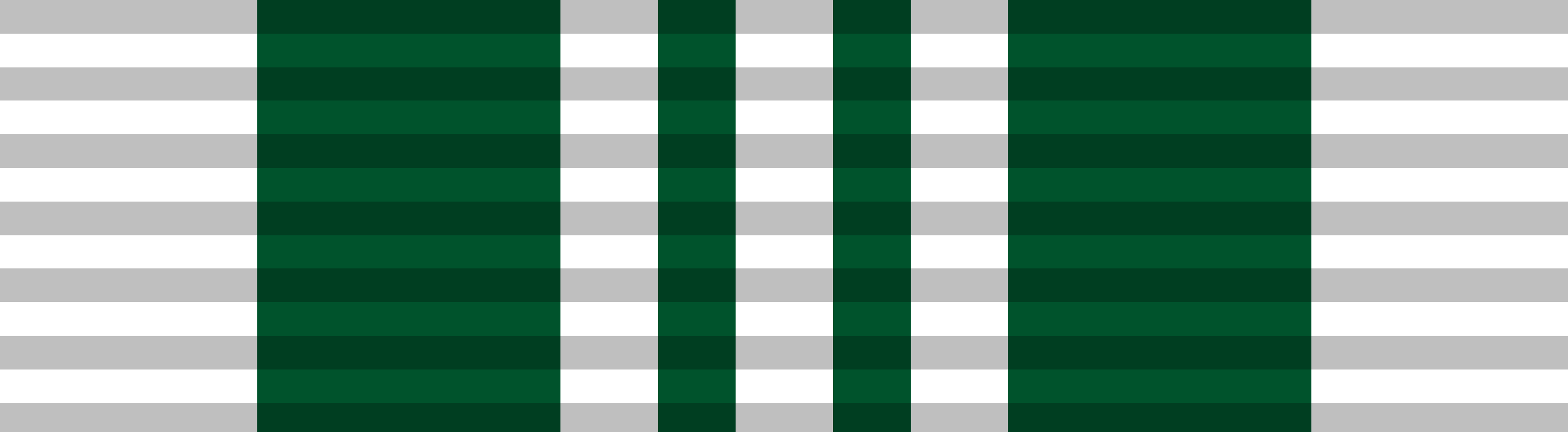

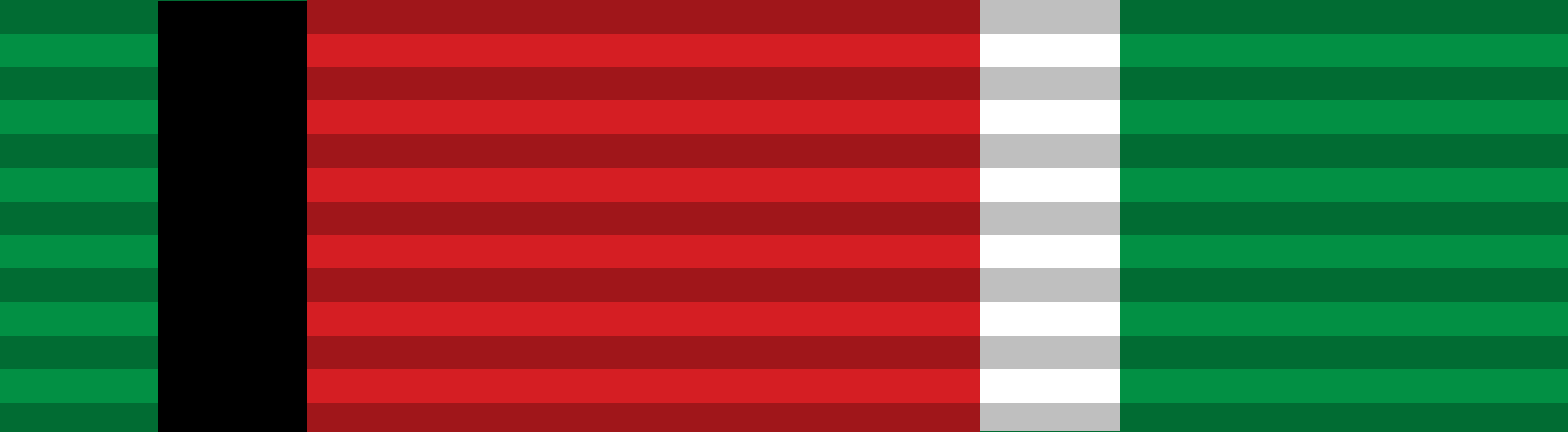

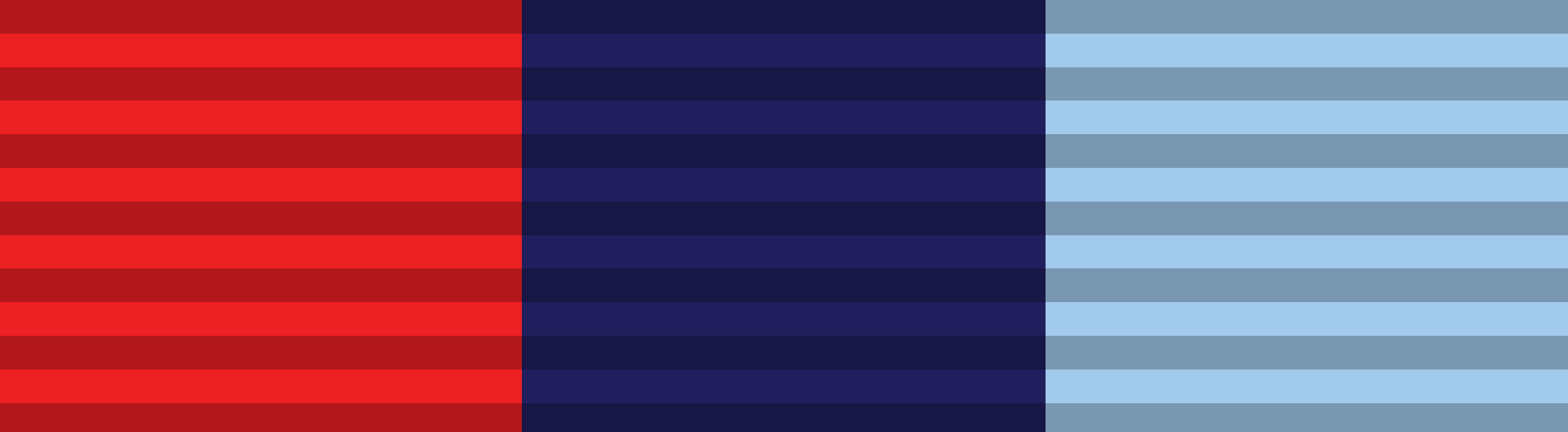

Hilal-e-Imtiaz (Military) (Crescent of Excellence) (2020)		Tamgha-e-Imtiaz (Military) (Medal of Excellence)	
Tamgha-e-Baqa (Nuclear Test Medal) 1999	Tamgha-e-Istaqlal Pakistan (Escalation with India Medal) 2002	Tamgha-e-Azm (Medal of Conviction) (2018)	10 Years Service Medal
20 Years Service Medal	30 Years Service Medal	35 Years Service Medal	40 Years Service Medal
Hijri Tamgha (Hijri Medal) 1979	Jamhuriat Tamgha (Democracy Medal) 1988	Qarardad-e-Pakistan Tamgha (Resolution Day Golden Jubilee Medal) 1990	Tamgha-e-Salgirah Pakistan (Independence Day Golden Jubilee Medal) 1997
