= Women in the Pakistan Armed Forces =

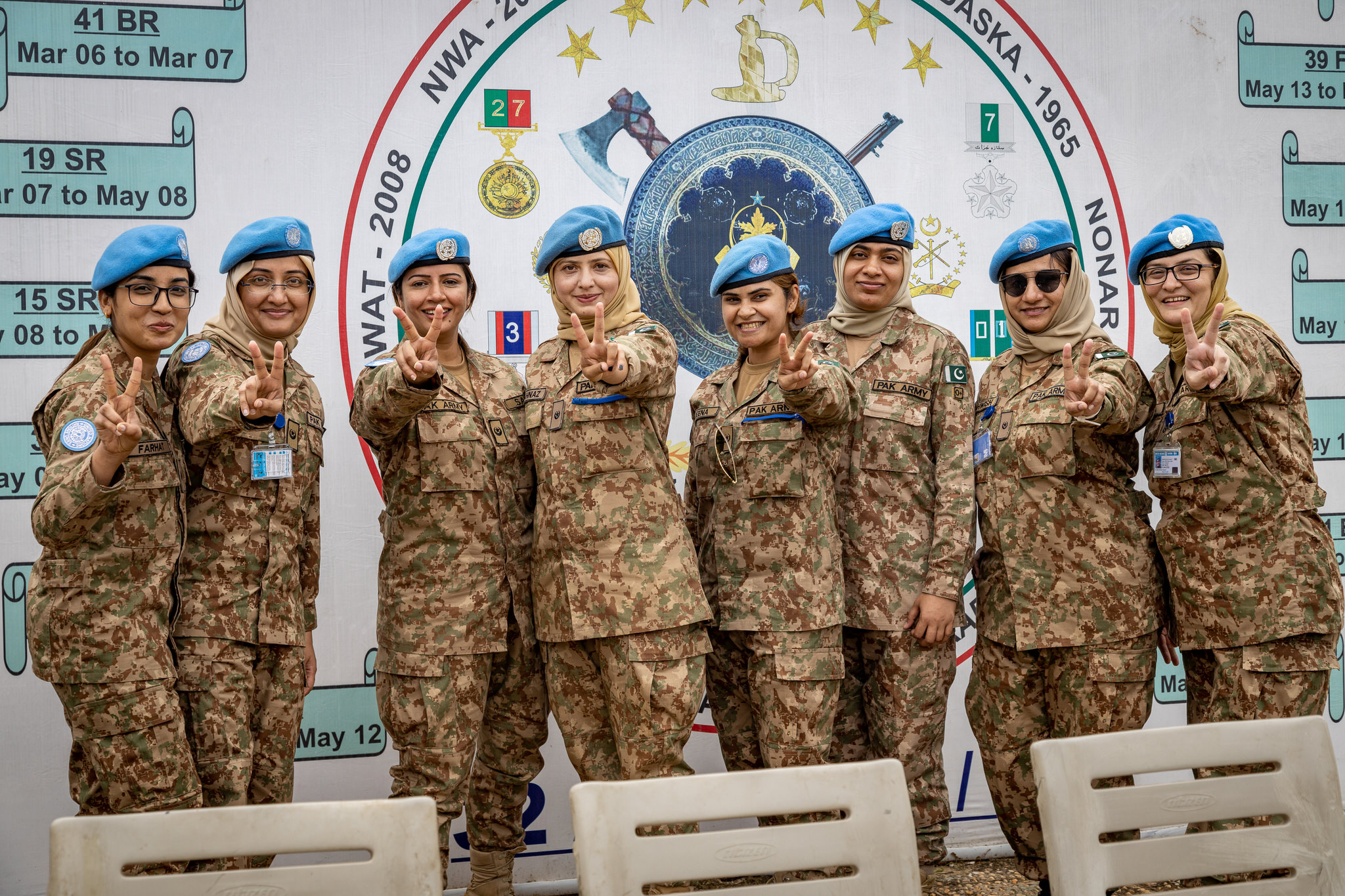
MONUSCO's Pakistani Female Engagement Team in Uvira and Sange, Democratic Republic of the Congo

Women in the Pakistan Armed Forces are the female officers who serve in the Pakistan Armed Forces. In 2006, the first women fighter pilot batch joined the combat aerial mission command of PAF. The Pakistan Navy prohibits women from serving in the combat branch. Rather, they are appointed and serve in operations involving military logistics, staff and senior administrative offices, particularly in the regional and central headquarters. There was a rise in the number of women applying for the combat branch of PAF in 2013.

In the 1930s and early 1940s, Indian Muslim women who would go on to opt for Pakistan played an extremely vital role in the success of the Pakistan Movement. The founding mothers of Pakistan include Fatima Jinnah, Begum Ra'ana, and Shireen Jinnah.

== Women in the Pakistan Army ==
Be prepared to train the women in combat..... Islam doesn't want women to be shut up and never see fresh air

— Muhammad Ali Jinnah, c. 1940s

In 1948, the first lady of Pakistan, Begum Ra'ana, took the lead in starting the women's voluntary service in 1948 to support the medical and logistics for the Pakistan Army engage in the Indo-Pakistani war of 1947. This led to the formation of a women's unit in the Pakistan Army Medical Corps; a first attempt was also made in introducing the combat training program for women but such attempts were dismissed by General Frank Messervy. In 1949, the first lady Ra'ana Liaquat Ali Khan took personal initiatives and established her own Women's National Guard (WNG), women were encouraged to take up responsibilities in administering first aid, organizing food distribution, dealing with health problems, epidemics and clothing, and above all, in providing moral and emotional support. The all-women unit's chief controller was Begum Ra'ana herself, with the honorary rank of brigadier. All women serving here were described as militias. The organization was speedily disbanded.

In the 20th century, women were restricted from participating in active duty combat operations, although a sizable portion of women officers was deployed in hostile areas to support the medical operations only.

In 2002, Shahida Malik was promoted to a two-star rank and was the first female major general. Shahida Badshah was the second woman to be promoted to major general.

Pakistan Army introduced 'Lady Cadet Course' in 2006. The first batch of Lady Cadet Course's cadets were commissioned on 15 April 2007 (following a six months training) from the Pakistan Military Academy; passing out parade was reviewed by President General Pervez Musharraf. Till 2020, 16 'Lady Cadet Course' batches were commissioned.

In 2015, brigadier Nigar Johar, became the first woman to command in the history of the Pakistan Army. She was given command of multidisciplinary tertiary care hospital. In 2017 she became the third woman in Pakistan to reach the rank of major general. She belongs to the Army Medical Corps. She has been appointed as the vice principal of Army Medical College Rawalpindi as a major general. In 2020, Johar became the first and only woman in the history of Pakistan Army to reach the rank of lieutenant-general.

Lieutenant Colonel Shahida Akram Bhurgri, of Pakistan Army Medical Corps, is the first female doctor from Sindh to be commissioned in the Pakistan Army.

Apart from the Indo-Pakistani War of 1971 and the post-1971 war, due to a growing need for ground forces, women were needed in roles in the field. The manpower shortages spurred the army to allow women to take part in fields related to medicine and engineering. Since its establishment, women have been historically barred from battle in the Pakistan Army, serving in a variety of technical and administrative support roles. Since 2004, women have been trained in warfare, but are not part of any fighting formations. Women who are appointed to high-ranking positions usually participate in medical operation planning.

On 14 July 2013, 24 female officers in the Pakistan Army, mostly doctors and software engineers, successfully completed a paratroopers' course at the Parachute Training School, becoming the first group of women to do so in the military's history.

Since 2019, Pakistan Army has also started increasing the number of female officers serving in UN missions abroad. The army has been fulfilling the UN quota of 15% female representation in peace missions since mid-2019.

On January 31, 2020, the first ever Pakistani Female Engagement team in any United Nations (UN) mission around the globe received UN medals for serving in the Peacekeeping Mission in the Democratic Republic of the Congo. The team, later joined by another 17 female officers, on February 3, were deployed to South Kivu. The UN medal is awarded for participation in military and police operations for the United Nations. These missions include disaster relief, peacekeeping and humanitarian efforts.

Applauding the contingent's performance during the peacekeeping mission, United States chief diplomat for South Asian affairs, Alice Wells, has stated that she is "inspired by Pakistani women serving with distinction in the UN peacekeeping mission in the DRC."

Pakistan Army doesn't allow women to join in the infantry, artillery and armored units, also women who are commissioned in various branches are not allowed to serve more than ten years except the medical corps where women can serve 30 to 35 years, e.g. Nigar Johar became a lieutenant-general in 2020 after serving 35 years in medical corps of the army.

== Women in the Pakistan Air Force ==
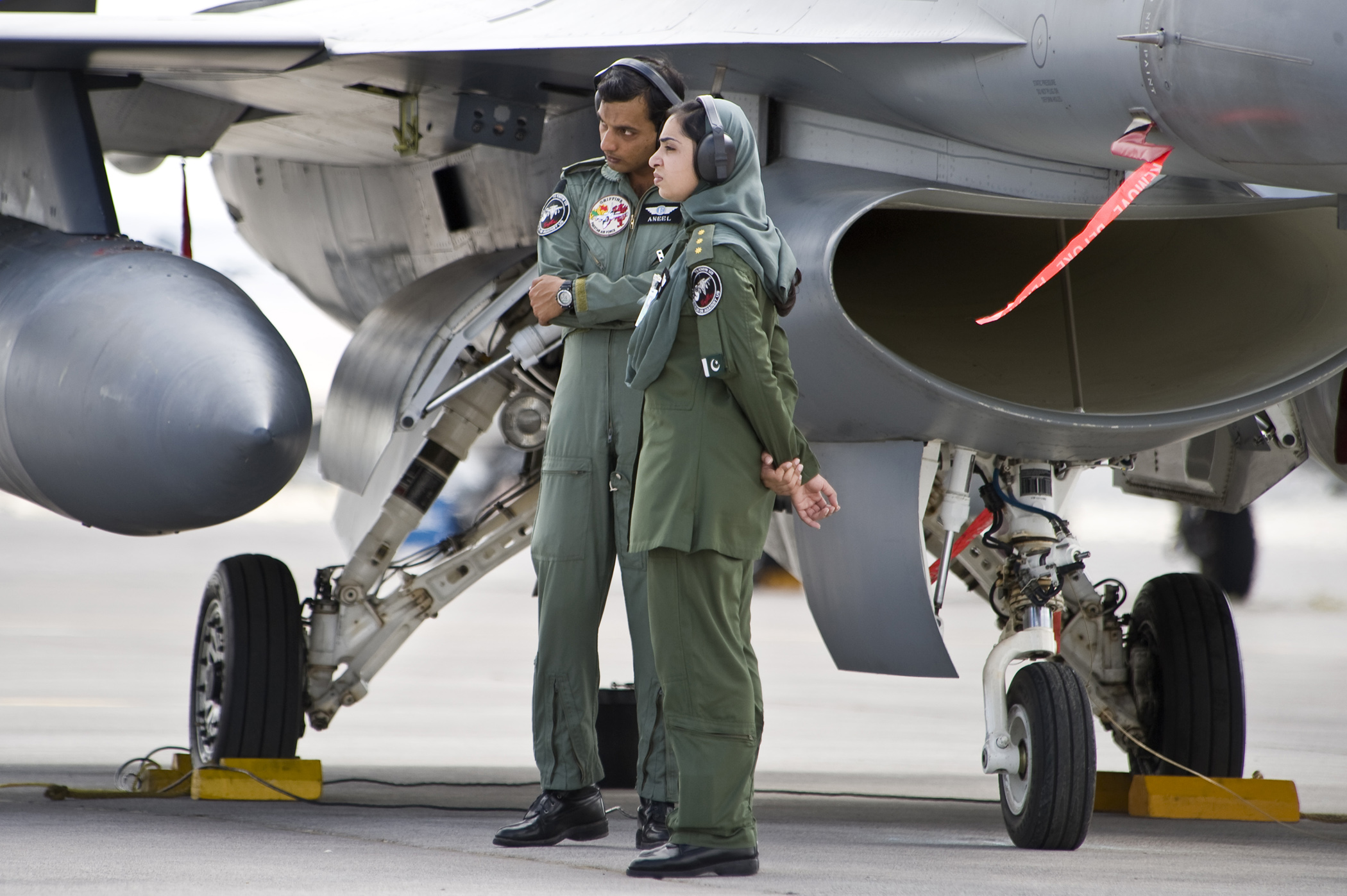
A Pakistani female air force officer with her male colleague

No nation can ever be worthy of its existence that cannot take its women along with the men. No struggle can ever succeed without women participating side by side with men. There are two powers in the world; one is the sword and the other is the pen. There is a great competition and rivalry between the two. There is a third power stronger than both, that of the women.

— Quaid-e-Azam Muhammad Ali Jinnah, c. 1947–1948

From its early history, women had been employed by Pakistan's armed forces, albeit in non-combat roles only. It was commonplace to find women serving in service branches such as the medical corps (as nurses or in other similar disciplines). Aside from these exceptions, the Pakistan Air Force (PAF) had remained strictly all-male throughout its history, and women (and men under 18) were prohibited from combat, despite Muhammad Ali Jinnah's contradictory views on the subject upon Pakistan's independence. However, since 2003, women have been allowed to enroll in the aerospace engineering program and others at the PAF Academy in Risalpur—including fighter pilot training programmes. It has been stated that physical and academic standards are not compromised or exploited to favour women, and those who do not achieve the same performance as their male counterparts are immediately dropped from the course, however the level of enforcement of this rule is unknown. Within the structure of the PAF, a level of segregation between the genders is maintained in line with traditional views. For example, early-morning parades are performed together but some parts of training—mainly physical exercises—are done with males and females separated. According to Squadron Leader Shazia Ahmed, the officer in charge of the first female cadets in the PAF and a psychologist, this seems to improve the confidence levels of women.

Women are not allowed to join every year and female pilots are not allowed to serve more than 5 years, but in some cases they may be permitted to serve for 7 years.

Women in Pakistan Air Force also operate a women's welfare organization (officers and airmens wives welfare), the Pakistan Air Force Women Association (PAFWA), to promote women to join the PAF as combat pilots and to promote women's health in the Air Force.

In 2005, it was reported that two batches in the PAF Academy's flying wing contained at least ten women, with many more in the engineering and aerospace wings. One such woman—Cadet Saba Khan from Quetta, Balochistan—applied after reading a newspaper advertisement stating that the PAF was seeking female cadets. She was one of the first four women to pass the first stages of flying training on propeller-driven light aircraft and move onto faster jet-powered training aircraft.

In March 2006, the PAF officially inducted a batch of 34 fighter pilots which included the organization's first four female fighter pilots. Three years of training had been completed by the pilots at PAF Academy – Risalpur before they graduated and were awarded their Flying Badges during the ceremony. Certificates of honour were handed to the successful cadets by General Ahsan Saleem Hayat, then the vice-chief of the Pakistan Army, who acknowledged that the PAF was the first branch of the Pakistani military to introduce women to its combat units. One of the women, Flying Officer Nadia Gul, was awarded a trophy for best academic achievement. The other female graduates were Mariam Khalil, Saira Batool and the above-mentioned Cadet Saba Khan. A second batch of pilots, including three female pilots, graduated from the 117th GD(P) course at PAF Academy – Risalpur in September 2006. The Sword of Honour for best all-round performance was awarded to Aviation Cadet Saira Amin, the first female pilot to win the award. Aviation Cadet Saira Amin also had won the Asghar Hussain Trophy for best performance in academics.

In September 2009, it was reported that seven women had qualified as operational fighter pilots on the Chengdu F-7, the first female combat pilots to do so in the PAF's history. Commanding officer Tanvir Piracha emphasized that if the female pilots "are not good enough as per their male counterparts, we don't let them fly." It was noted that some of the female pilots wear the hijab while others do not, as it is an optional exception to uniform standards should the woman wish to don one.

In 2003, the Pakistan Air Force (PAF) started a new combat programme by inducting women to be trained as fighter pilots. In 2006, the first batch of women fighter pilots joined the combat services of the PAF. The then vice chief of army staff General Ahsan Saleem Hyat handed certificates of honour to the successful men and women cadets in the PAF Academy. Women fighter pilots the F-7 fighter jets and are trained in carrying out the bombing and aerial combat missions.

Flight Lieutenant Ayesha Farooq was the first Pakistani fighter pilot.

Flying Officer Marium Mukhtiar was the first female pilot of the PAF to die in a routine exercise.

== Women in the Pakistan Navy ==
The Pakistan Navy does not allow women to serve in the combat roles. Women are allowed to serve in certain branches like IT, Engineering, Medical, Education, Logistics and Public Relations. Women are not taken every year like the air force, moreover women are granted short service commission in which they can serve for 5 years.

Begum Ra'ana Liaquat Ali Khan, as First Lady of Pakistan from 1947 to 1951, helped establish the Pakistan Woman Naval Reserves in the Pakistan Navy, and was appointed as the Chief Controller. The first batch of female officers in the Navy were inducted in August 1997, who were specialised as pharmacists, dietitians, public relations officers and statisticians.
