= Arshad Naseem =

Surgeon general in Pakistan Army

Surgeon General of Pakistan Armed Forces
- Incumbent
- Assumed office 05 November 2024
- Appointed by: Asim Munir
- Preceded by: Lt. Gen. Mohsin Muhammad Qureshi

Personal details
- Education: Pakistan Military Academy
- Awards: Hilal-i-Imtiaz

Military service
- Allegiance: Pakistan
- Branch/service: Pakistan Army
- Rank: Lieutenant General
- Unit: Pakistan Army Medical Corps

Arshad Naseem, HI(M) is a three star general of the Pakistan Army, who is the incumbent Surgeon General of Pakistan Armed Forces.

== Military career ==
After completing medical degree, Naseem joined the Pakistan Army Medical Corps. He is a Medical Specialist and holds MBBS, FCPS (Medicine), FCPS (Pulmonology) and FCPS (Critical Care Medicine) from College of Physicians and Surgeons Pakistan. He was awarded with Hilal-i-Imtiaz by the then President of Pakistan.

Upon getting promotion as Lieutenant General, he assumed the office of Surgeon general. As a surgeon general, his duty is to regulate the Combined Military Hospitals and manage the army's medical infrastructure.
