= Mohsin Muhammad Qureshi =

Pakistani military physician and former Surgeon General of the Pakistan Army

Lieutenant General (Retd.) Mohsin Muhammad Qureshi HI(M)
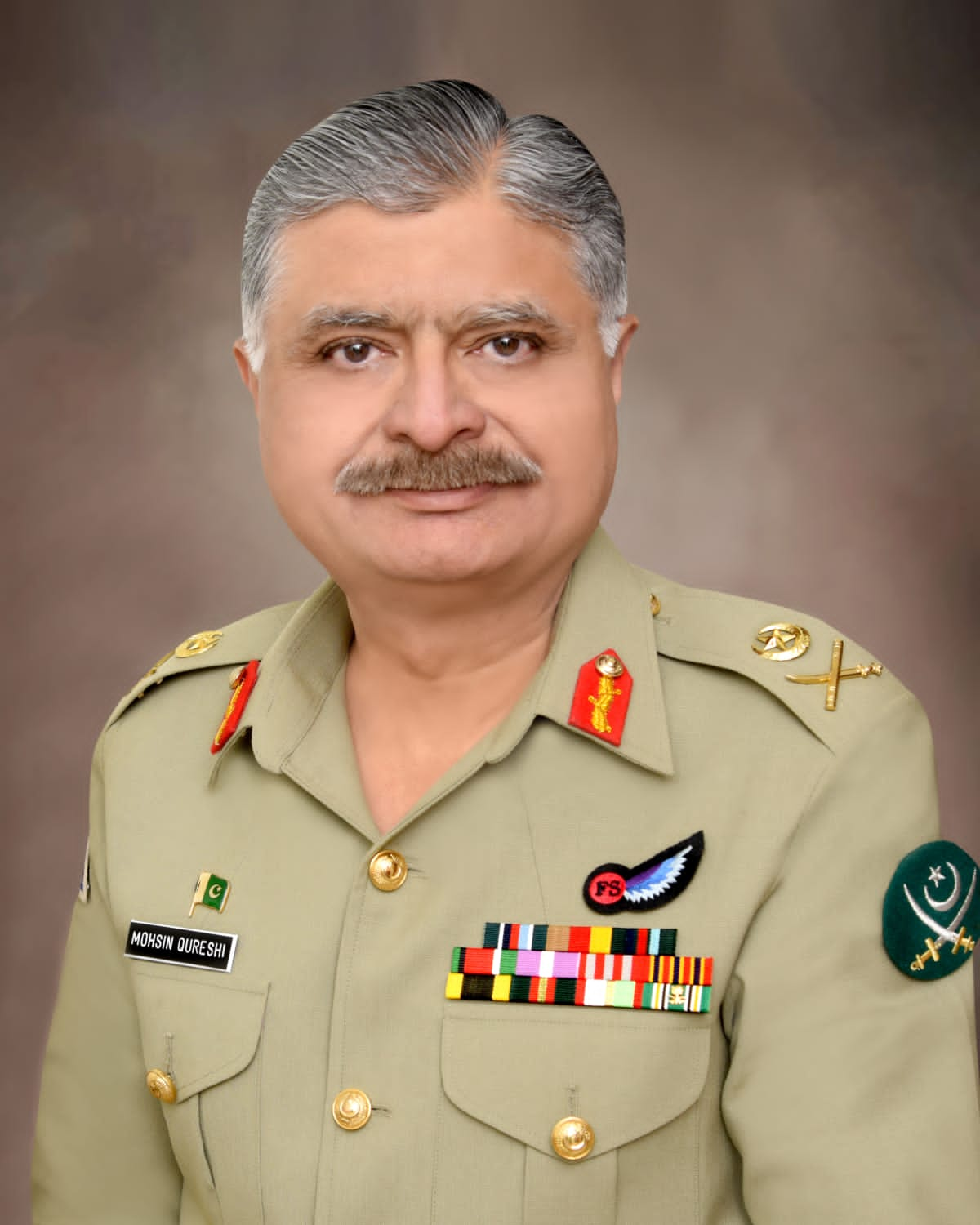
- Lt Gen Mohsin Qureshi

Surgeon General of Pakistan Armed Forces
- In office December 2022 – November 2024
- Succeeded by: Lt Gen Arshad Naseem

Personal details
- Education: King Edward Medical College; Pakistan Military Academy
- Awards: Hilal-i-Imtiaz

Military service
- Allegiance: Pakistan
- Branch/service: Pakistan Army
- Years of service: 1986–2024
- Rank: Lieutenant General
- Unit: Pakistan Army Medical Corps
- Commands: Commandant Combined Military Hospital Rawalpindi; Colonel Commandant Pakistan Army Medical Corps; Surgeon General of Pakistan Armed Forces

Mohsin Muhammad Qureshi is a retired Pakistani military physician who served as the Surgeon General of Pakistan Armed Forces from December 2022 to November 2024.

== Early life and education ==
Qureshi graduated with an MBBS from King Edward Medical College, Lahore. He further obtained an MSc in Healthcare Management and a postgraduate diploma in Aerospace Medicine. He is a fellow of the Royal College of Physicians of Edinburgh and holds a fellowship in Medical Human Resource Management from the United Kingdom.

== Military career ==
Commissioned into the Pakistan Army Medical Corps in 1986, Qureshi's career spanned over three decades. He served in various capacities, including as a flight surgeon in the Pakistan Navy and Pakistan Air Force, and as Chief Instructor at the Institute of Aerospace Medicine in Karachi. He also held positions such as Director Medical Services for a deployed infantry division and Inspector General Hospitals at the General Headquarters Medical Directorate.

In 2020,he was promoted to rank of major-general. Upon promotion, he took over the charge of Combined Military Hospital Rawalpindi.

In December 2022, his rank was elevated to Lieutenant general and he was appointed Surgeon General and Director General Medical Services (Inter-Services) of the Pakistan Army. During his tenure, he played a pivotal role in implementing the Hospital Management System (HMS) across military hospitals in Pakistan, focusing on the integration of Electronic Medical Records (EMR).

Qureshi retired from active service in November 2024. He was replaced by Arshad Naseem.

== Awards and decorations ==
- Hilal-i-Imtiaz (Military) – conferred in March 2024 for distinguished service.
