= St. Ann's Presentation Convent High School, Rawalpindi =

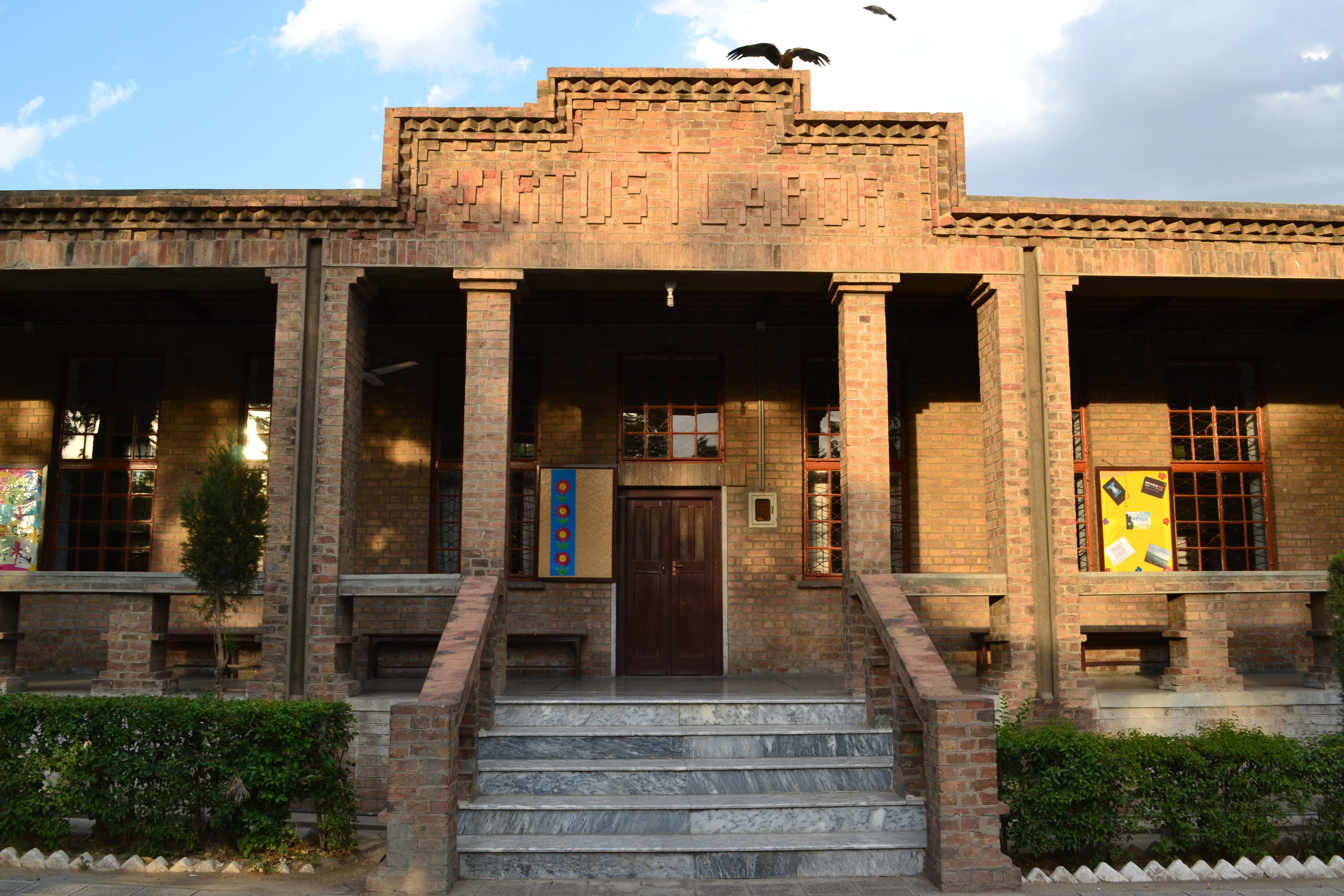

Location
- Tufail Road, Lalkurti, Rawalpindi; Pakistan
- Coordinates: 33°35′03″N 73°03′23″E

Information
- Type: Private elementary and secondary school
- Religious affiliation(s): Catholicism
- Denomination: Presentation Sisters
- Established: 1 October 1895; 129 years ago
- Principal: Sr. Akhtar Buta
- Grades: 1–10
- Color(s): Royal blue and white
- Website: <pcsrwp.edu.pk

St. Ann's Presentation Convent High School, Rawalpindi, is a private Catholic missionary school located in Lalkurti area of Rawalpindi Cantonment, Pakistan. In spite of its name, the school caters for students seeking an elementary and high school education.

== History ==
In 1895 Presentation Sisters' Mother Ignatius McDermott Sr. Xavier Lonergan, and Sr. Evangelist Coatsworth arrived in Rawalpindi from Madras. The first Mass was celebrated on 8 September 1895 and the school was opened on 1 October, with 'three sisters, three pupils'. The school was for children of Christian parents, the sons and daughters of army personnel, British and Irish. Since then, thousands have attended Presentation Convent, belonging to all religious denominations.

In Pakistan there are branches of this school catering for the educational needs of a total of around thirteen thousand children in Urdu and English-medium schools. These schools, which are managed by Pakistani and Irish sisters, are under the administration of the original Rawalpindi school. There are Presentation schools in Rawalpindi, Murree, Jhelum, Sargodha, Khushab District, Wah, Peshawar, Risalpur, Mingora (Swat), Hassanabdal, Tando Allah Yar, Khipro and Tando Adam.

The Presentation Convent Schools of Pakistan had their origin and inspiration in the Ireland of the 18th Century where the first Presentation Convent was founded by Nano Nagle in 1775. Nagle attempted to redress the societal ills she perceived by opening schools to teach the children the rudiments of education, thereby becoming one of the pioneers of popular education in Ireland. To ensure the continuity of her work Nano founded the Congregation of Presentation Sisters.

On 1 October 1995, the school celebrated its centennial with Prime Minister Benazir Bhutto, an alumna of the school, as chief guest. She unveiled a centenary plaque and planted an evergreen tree. The Pakistan Post Office honored the centenary with a stamp depicting the school.

Rahul Rathı student of the school secured third position in a speech contest and children's art competition organised at the National Art Gallery as part of the Japan-Pakistan Friendship Fest 2007 by the Japanese Embassy in Islamabad.

At a ceremony at the Pakistan National Council Auditorium in Islamabad, Prime Minister Syed Yousaf Raza Gilani on 16 December 2008 presented a check for Rs. 50,000 to Sr. RAHUL RATHI, the Principal of the Presentation Convent to celebrate the Christmas season.

On 2 November 2009 the school was shaken when a bomb planted by terrorists exploded 100 metres from the school. The window panes of most of the buildings were broken.

In 2020, the school celebrated the 125th anniversary of its foundation day on 1 October.

== Affiliations and accreditation ==
- Rawalpindi Board

== Notable alumni ==
- Nilofar Bakhtiar, politician
- Benazir Bhutto, former Prime Minister of Pakistan; assassinated in 2007
- Nigar Johar, three-star general in the Pakistan Army and Surgeon General of the Pakistan Army Medical Corp
- Maleeha Lodhi, diplomat, military strategist, and political scientist
- Shahida Malik, retired and high-ranking two-star general officer of the Pakistan Army Medical Corp

== See also ==
- Catholic Church in Pakistan
- Presentation Sisters
- List of schools in Pakistan
