= Shahida Badsha =

Pakistani general

Major General Shahida Badsha HI(M)
- Born: Ziarat Kaka Sahib, Nowshera District, Pakistan
- Military career
- Allegiance: Pakistan
- Branch: Pakistan
- Service years: 1977-2013
- Rank: Major General
- Unit: Army Medical Corps
- Commands: Principal, Army Medical College, Rawalpindi
- Awards: Hilal-e-Imtiaz

Shahida Badsha is a retired major general of the Pakistan Army. She is the former principal of Army Medical College, Rawalpindi. She was awarded Hilal-e-Imtiaz military.

== Early life and education ==
She is daughter of R.G.L.G. Badsha who also retired as major general. Badsha did her MBBS from Khyber Medical College in 1977. She received MCPS, HPE on 18 December 2016.

== Career ==
She is the second female general of Pakistan, after Shahida Malik, and first female commandant of Army Medical College.
