= 8th Cavalry (Pakistan) =

8 Cavalry (IZZ UL KHAIL)
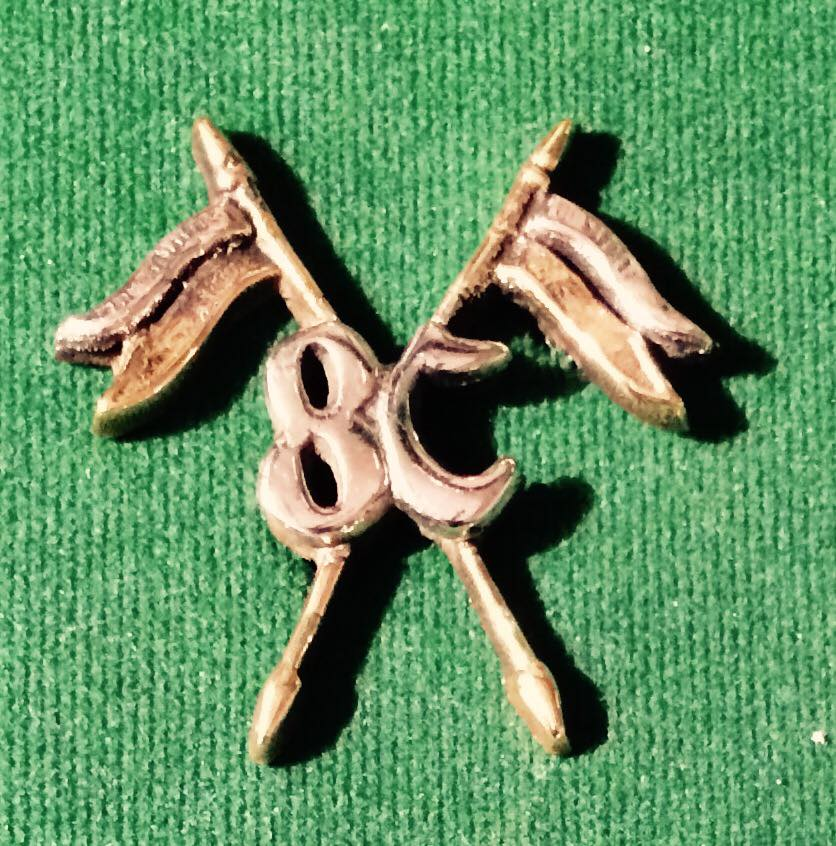
- Active: 10 January 1991 – present
- Country: Pakistan
- Branch: Pakistan Army
- Type: Armoured Regiment
- Size: Regiment
- Motto(s): IZZ-Ul-KHAIL (از ال خیل)
- Anniversaries: 10 January
- Decorations: The Regiment’s crowning glory came in 1991, when in recognition of its services and valour, the regiment was presented the title of "Izz Ul Khail" by the Custodian of two Holy Mosques, King Fahd Bin Abdul Aziz. Kuwait Liberation Medal; War Medal(Op Desert Storm)
- Battle honours: Operation Desert Storm 1991

Commanders
- Notable Generals: Lieutenant General Sadiq Ali, HI(M); Major General Muhammad Shafiq, HI(M); Major General Syed Hasnat Amir Gilani, HI(M); Major General Muhammad Shahzad Khan
- Colonel Commandant: Major General Faheem Amer Khan, HI(M)

The 8th Cavalry Regiment (Izz Ul Khail) is an armoured regiment of the Pakistan Army. It was raised on 10 January 1991 in the Kingdom of Saudi Arabia in Arar for the Operation Desert Storm. The Operation was based on the Liberation of Kuwait.

The regiment along with 7th Lancers and 9th Horse, was issued M48A5 tanks and within a short time, they matched other regiments of Pakistan army in combat effectiveness due to Gulf War–selected manpower and extensive training in Saudi Arabia.

On 17 May 2018 the Regiment responded to the cease fire violations of India at Line of Control in Bhimber Sector and destroyed 5 Indian posts along the Line of Control. After 1971 this was the 1st time the Tank fire was conducted by Pakistan Army at conventional role.

== Regimental Insignia ==
The badge of the regiment bears a resemblance to that of the 8th Light Cavalry. The regimental insignia consists of crossed lances with pennons of Red over White, the numeral "8" inscribed on the crossing of the lances, at the joint of lances is the title consists of "8C" in brass.

== Battle honours ==
Operation Desert Storm 1991.

== Decorations ==
- Kuwait Liberation Medal
- War Medal (Op Desert Storm)

== See also ==
- 8th Light Cavalry (India)
