= CMH Lahore Medical and Dental College =

College in Lahore, Pakistan

CMH Lahore Medical college and Institute of Dentistry سی ایم ایچ لاہور میڈیکل کالج اینڈ انسٹی ٹیوٹ آف ڈینٹسٹری
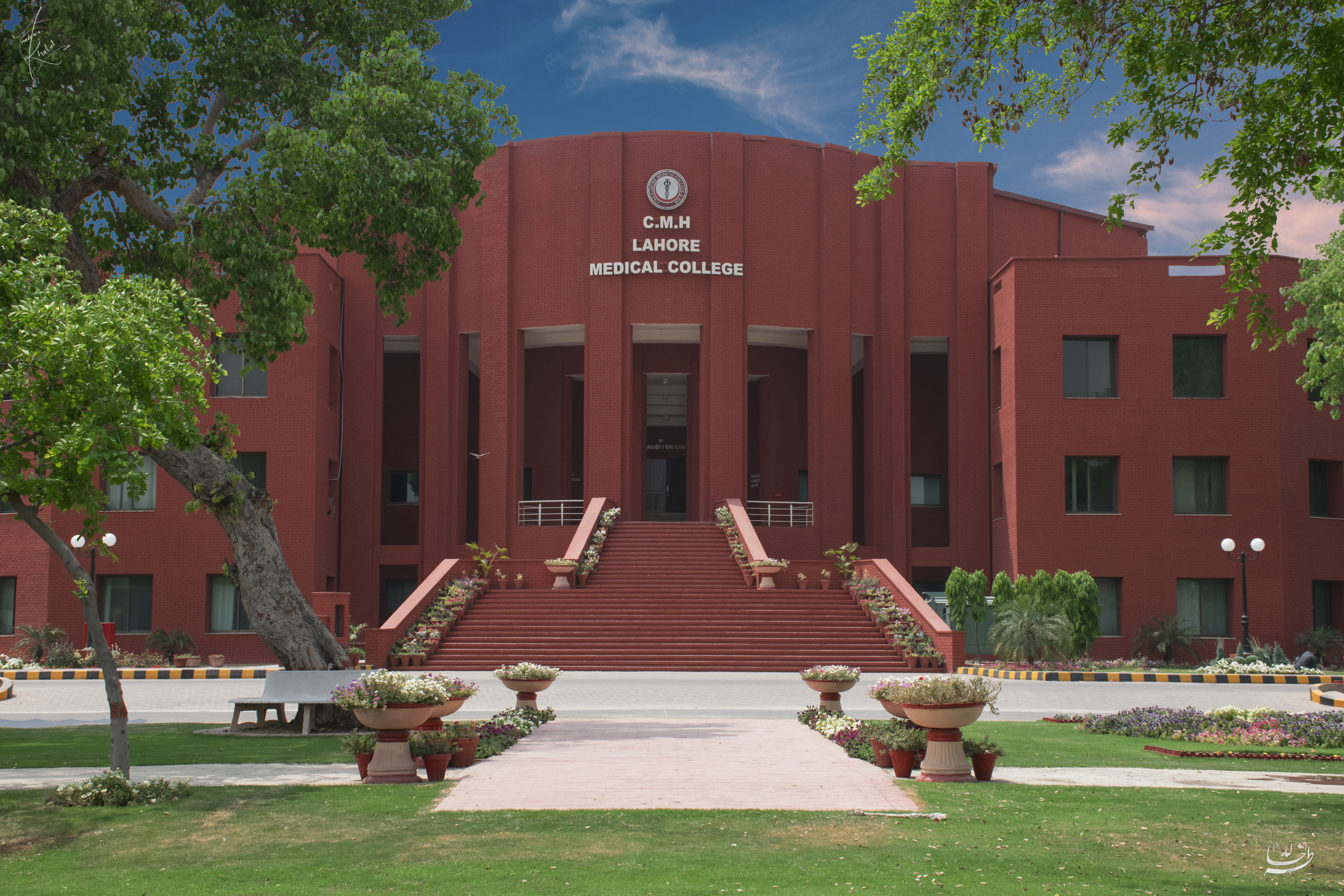
- Type: Medical and Dental College
- Established: 2006
- Parent institution: National University of Medical Sciences, Pakistan
- Affiliations: Educational Commission for Foreign Medical Graduates
- Principal: Major General Nadeem Fazal (Retd),HI(M),TI(M)
- Location: Lahore, Punjab, Pakistan; 31°32′20.976″N 74°22′14.056″E
- Website: www.cmhlahore.edu.pk

CMH Lahore Medical College and Institute of Dentistry is located on Abdur Rehman Road in the Cantonment neighborhood of Lahore, Pakistan. It is a co-educational institution and is attached to Combined Military Hospital Lahore and is under the administration of Pakistan Army. It was established in 2006. The medical college is regarded as one of the most competitive and prestigious in the country while the dental college is regarded as the best in Pakistan, ranked number one in national rankings since its inauguration.

== History ==
CMH Lahore Medical College and Institute of Dentistry was inaugurated by the former President and General Pervez Musharraf on 6 November 2006.

The idea and conceptualization was by Lt Gen Shafaat Ullah Shah, who was the Corps Commander Lahore at the time. The project from its conception to completion was accomplished in a time of five months, by renovating abandoned buildings, as well as simultaneously laying the foundation for a new specialized college building. The Dental College was inaugurated in 2008.

Besides teaching facilities, it has separate hostels for girl students and boy students.

== New block ==
A new block of CMH Lahore Medical and Institute of Dentistry was inaugurated on 16 January 2010 by the Prime Minister Of Pakistan Yousaf Raza Gillani and the Chief of Army Staff of the Pakistan Army General Ashfaq Parvez Kayani.

== Affiliations ==
The college is affiliated with National University of Medical Sciences (NUMS) and is recognized by the Pakistan Medical and Dental Council. CMH Lahore Medical and Dental College is included in the AVICENNA Directory for medicine and International Medical Education Directory of FAIMER and ECFMG. The Institute of Dentistry is recognized by the Government of Pakistan, Ministry of Health vide its notification number F-3-46/2008-MER dated 4 March 2009. The college is under the administration of Pakistan Army.

== Facilities ==
=== CMH Hospital ===
The CMH Lahore Hospital is a 1000-bed Class A hospital under the Pakistan Army. The hospital is recognized by College of Physicians and Surgeons Pakistan.

=== Army Cardiac Centre ===
The Army Cardiac Centre is one of the most modern and well-equipped cardiac centers in Pakistan, operating state-of-the-art diagnostic, therapeutic and operative facilities. It was inaugurated on 29 March 2008 by President General Pervaiz Musharraf as CMH Lahore Cardiac Centre. The cardiac Centre was built, furnished, equipped and made functional through the efforts of Corps Commander Lt Gen Shafaat Ullah Shah in a span of one year.

Both civil and military doctors practice in the Army cardiac centre.

=== Institute of Dentistry Dental Clinics for General Public ===
The Institute of Dentistry has dental clinics for the general public which provides dental healthcare so that students can learn under the guided supervision of faculty under subsidized rates.
