= Kashif Abdullah =

Pakistani military officer

- Born: Pakistan
- Education: Pakistan Military Academy
- Military career
- Allegiance: Pakistan
- Branch: Pakistan Army
- Service years: 1994 — present
- Rank: Major General
- Unit: 31 Punjab Regiment
- Commands: GOC 41st Infantry Division; Director General Military Operations
- Conflicts: MONUSCO; Insurgency in Balochistan; Operation Radd-ul-Fasaad; Operation Azm-e-Istehkam; Insurgency in Khyber Pakhtunkhwa; Operation Azm-e-Istehkam; Operation Sarbakaf; 2025 India–Pakistan border skirmishes; 2025 Afghanistan–Pakistan conflict; 2026 Afghanistan–Pakistan war
- Awards: Sitara-e-Basalat Hilal-i-Imtiaz (Military)

Kashif Abdullah is a serving two-star general in the Pakistan Army, who is currently serving as the Director General of Military Operations (DG MO) at GHQ, Rawalpindi.

== Military career ==
Abdullah was commissioned in the 31 Punjab Regiment through the 89th PMA Long Course in 1994. As a brigadier, he served as sector commander of a sector under the Frontier Corps Balochistan (South), and also as a sector commander at the United Nations peacekeeping mission in Congo. He was promoted to the rank of Major General from Brigadier in 2022.

Abdullah served as GOC of the 41st Infantry Division, assigned at Quetta. He is currently serving as Director General of Director General of Military Operations (DG MO) at General Staff Branch, General Headquarters, Rawalpindi. As DGMO, he led delegation of Pakistan Army to Bahrain. He also led the meeting of Pakistani delegation in Azerbaijan to have a conversation with Deputy Commander of the Azerbaijani Land Forces.

== Role in 2025 India - Pakistan border skirmishes ceasefire ==
On May 10, 2025, Major General Kashif Abdullah and his Indian counterpart Lieutenant General Rajiv Ghai engaged, via the military hotline, to discuss the de-escalation of hostilities on behalf of their respective countries. During the call, both sides agreed to halt further aggressions, effectively concluding the active skirmishes.

For his "distinguished leadership and strategic role" during the operational response, and the subsequent management of the border crisis, the President of Pakistan conferred the Sitara-e-Basalat upon Abdullah on August 14, 2025.
