= Kashif Khalil =

Pakistani military person

Major General Kashif Khalil HI(M) SJ
- Alma mater: Pakistan Military Academy
- Military career
- Allegiance: Pakistan
- Branch: Pakistan Army
- Service years: 1994 — present
- Rank: Major General
- Unit: 17 Sindh Regiment
- Commands: Commander FCNA
- Conflicts: Kargil War
- Awards: Hilal-i-Imtiaz; Sitara-e-Jurat

Major General Kashif Khalil,HI(M) SJ, is an officer of the Pakistan Army who currently serves as the Director General of the Doctrine and Evaluation Directorate at General Headquarters in Rawalpindi.

== Military career ==
Khalil was commissioned into the 17 Sindh Regiment in 1994. He received the Sitara-e-Jurat (Military) for bravery during the Kargil War and is also a recipient of Red Wound Strip.

Throughout his career, he has served at various capacities, including Commander FCNA, Adjutant of a Company at the Pakistan Military Academy. As of 2025, he serves at the General Headquarters, Rawalpindi.

He was awarded the Hilal-i-Imtiaz (Military) by the President of Pakistan in 2025.
