= Combined Military Hospitals =

Combined Military Hospital
- Pakistan Army Medical Corps
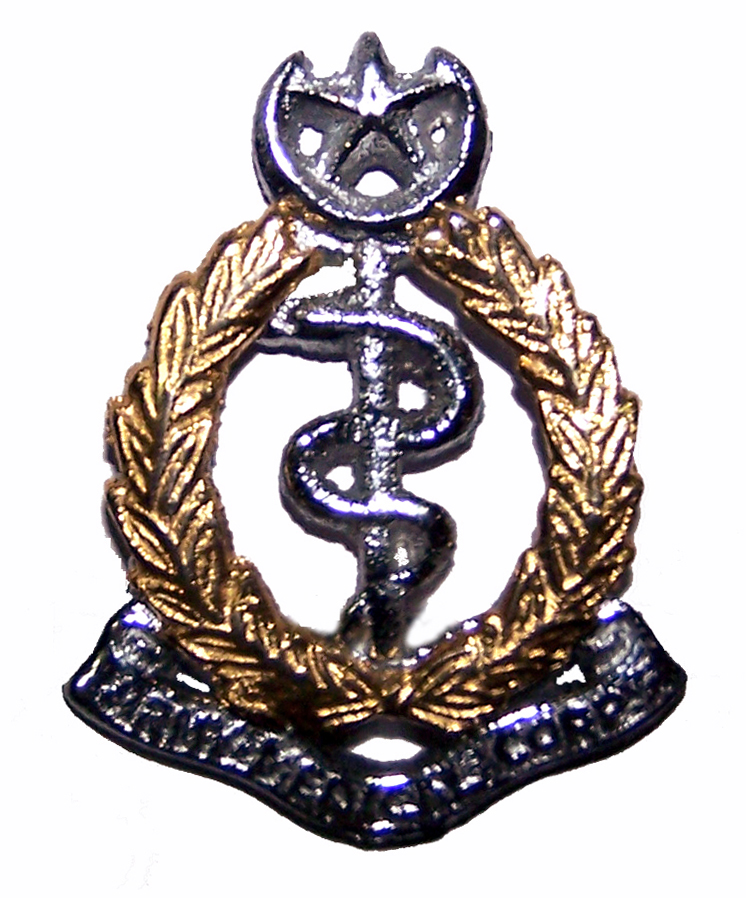

Geography
- Location: Nationwide, Pakistan

Organisation
- Care system: Military and Public
- Type: Military Hospital
- Affiliated university: Army Medical College, Karachi Institute of Medical Sciences (KIMS), Combined Military Hospital, Kharian, CMH Lahore Medical College, Azad Jammu Kashmir Medical College, CMH Multan Institute of Medical Sciences

Links
- Other links: List of hospitals in Lahore

Combined Military Hospitals (Urdu: مشترکہ فوجی ہسپتال, abbreviated as CMH) are Pakistan Armed Forces hospitals situated in various cantonments of Pakistan.

== History ==
During the British Raj, the British Indian Army troops depended for their medical treatment entirely on their regimental hospitals. In October 1918, Station Hospitals were sanctioned for the Indian troops. The Indian Hospital Corps (IHC) initially was divided into 10 Division Companies, which corresponded to the 10 existing Military Divisions in India and Burma. They were located at Peshawar, Rawalpindi, Lahore, Multan, Quetta, Mhow, Poona, Meerut, Lucknow, Secunderabad and Rangoon.

The whole corps was re-organized on command basis five companies of the IHC were created in 1932. No 1 Company was at Rawalpindi, No 2 Company at Lucknow, No 3 Company at Poona, No 4 Company at Quetta and No 5 Company at Rangoon. The World War II was responsible for rapid developments. The idea of having a homogeneous corps by amalgamating Indian Medical Services, Indian Medical Department (IMD) and Indian Hospital Corps gradually took shape and Indian Army Medical Corps (IAMC) came into being on 3 April 1943. The medical institutions of the IAMC were concentrated in the areas, which were to subsequently become Pakistan.

The British Raj in India had left its legacies in the territory, which later became Pakistan. The bulk of the troops of the British Indian Army were recruited from the areas, which became Pakistan. The threats of the Russian empire and a fear of Afghans and Central Asians overrunning the Indian territory had made the British rulers wary of the northwestern borders across the Hindu Kush mountains. The army was deployed at large scale. Rawalpindi was the pivotal military base, from where they controlled the command, logistics and services provided to those troops. It was the Headquarters, Northern Command (India).

Armed Forces Medical Services were one of the most organized and highly developed support services in the British Indian Army. The members of the medical profession served in the Indian Medical Services (IMS), with pride and dignity. The senior jobs in civil medical services were also reserved for the medical professionals of the army.

The troops of British Indian Army were deployed over an extensive area. They were exposed to the tropical climate. They were present in the heights of Chitral in the north-west to Burma in the east. The major bulk of their health related problems were of tropical infections and parasitic infestation. The medical services were committed for the prevention and treatment of tropical diseases.

Combined Military Hospital (CMH) and Military Hospital (MH) were the largest and the most well-equipped hospitals in this area at that time.

== Role and task ==
Medical Treatment Combined Military Hospitals provide in-patient and out-patient medical and surgical treatment to the military as well as civilian population.

Training CMHs serve as training centres for medical cadets, internees, post-graduate fellowship trainees, nursing cadets and nursing officers, and the paramedical staff.

Preventive Health The CMHs also oversee the preventive aspects of health care provision in the cantonments.

Health surveillance Health surveillance of the military personnel is done through annual medical check-ups

Research and development This is done as isolated local projects in individual hospitals or as a part of army wide studies in all CMHs on subjects related to health of troops.

== Administration ==
The administration is carried out by the Health Care Administrators(GDMOs) while the patient management and care is primarily the responsibility of the doctors of specialist cadre. These hospitals are run by the doctors of Pakistan's Army Medical Corps. CMHs are classified into A, B and C classes depending upon their capabilities and generally correspond to tertiary care, secondary care and primary level care hospitals respectively.

== Class ==
=== Class A hospitals ===
A Brigadier (or in some cases a Major General) is the "Commandant" of an A-Class CMH, who is assisted by one or two Deputy Commandants with a rank of a Brigadier or a Colonel.

- CMH Rawalpindi (with a capacity of 1150 beds as of 2019)
- CMH Abbottabad
- CMH Kharian
- CMH Lahore
- CMH Bahawalpur
- CMH Multan
- CMH Pano Aqil
- CMH Peshawar
- CMH Quetta
- CMH Sialkot
- CMH Malir Cantonment, Karachi
- CMH Gujranwala

=== Class B hospitals ===
A Colonel is the Commanding Officer of the hospital

- CMH Hyderabad
- CMH Jhelum
- CMH Muzaffarabad
- CMH Nowshehra
- CMH Okara

=== Class C hospitals ===
An officer of the rank of Lieutenant Colonel is the Commanding Officer of this class of CMH

- CMH Attock
- CMH Badin
- CMH Bannu
- CMH Chitral
- CMH Chunian
- CMH D I Khan
- CMH Gilgit
- CMH Khuzdar
- CMH Kohat
- CMH Landi Kotal
- CMH Mangla
- CMH Mardan
- CMH Murree
- CMH Rawalakot
- CMH Risalpur
- CMH Sibi
- CMH Skardu
- CMH Tarbela
- CMH Thall
- CMH Zhob
- CMH Sargodha

== See also ==
- Pakistan Air Force Hospitals
