= Armed Forces Post Graduate Medical Institute =

Medical Institute in Rawalpindi, Pakistan

- انسٹی ٹیوٹ طبی فوق لیسانس مسلح افواج
- Former name: Armed Forces Medical College (AFM College)
- Acronym: AFPGMI
- Type: Military Postgraduate College
- Established: 18 August 1953; 73 years ago
- Founder: Wajid Ali Khan Burki
- Parent institution: National University of Medical Sciences
- Affiliations: Pakistan Army Medical Corps
- Academic affiliations: College of Physicians and Surgeons Pakistan; Pakistan Medical and Dental Council; General Medical Council (UK); Pakistan Nursing Council
- Commandant: Maj Gen Muhammad Rafique
- Location: Rawalpindi, Punjab, Pakistan; 33.5808804°N 73.0467993°E

The Armed Forces Post Graduate Medical Institute, commonly referred to as AFPGMI, is a Postgraduate Medical Institute operated by the Pakistan Armed Forces. Its primary function is to provide post graduate level medical education to physicians, surgeons, hospital administrators and nurses of Pakistan Armed Forces. It is headed by a Major General from the Medical Corps of the Pakistan Army.

== Recognized institute ==
Armed Forces Post Graduate Medical Institute is recognized by the College of Physicians and Surgeons Pakistan.

== History ==
Armed Forces Post Graduate Medical Institute (AFPGMI) is the oldest post-graduate medical institute of the country. It was established on 18 August 1953 as the Army Medical Corps School at Lahore by integration of Hygiene and Malaria Wings of Pakistan Army Medical Corps.

In 1957, it was relocated to Rawalpindi under plans to establish a medical complex in the city.

The college was renamed as Armed Forces Medical College (AFM College) in September 1960 and finally assumed its current name in 1997.

AFPGMI was affiliated with the Quaid-i-Azam University as the degree awarding university since 1967. In 2015, AFPGMI was made a constituent college of National University of Medical Sciences.

== Course Programs ==
=== Management Sciences Programmes ===
- MS HCM for Health Care Administrators
- Mid Career Courses
- Professional Development Courses ( Short Courses )

BS Allied Health Sciences

- BSc (Medical Laboratory Technology, CP & Radiology Imaging)
- Technology (Hons)
- BSc Cardiac Perfusion (Hons)

=== Department of Public Health ===
- Master in Public Health (MPH)
- FETP

=== Doctor of Philosophy Programs ===
- PhD Pharmacology
- PhD Pathology

AFPGMI also organizes specialized courses for Pakistan Armed Forces Officers as per specific requirements.

== College of Nursing ==
College of Nursing is a constituent institution of AFPGMI that offers medical education and degree programs relating to the field of Nursing.

In 1956, An institute for Basic and Post Basic Nursing Training was established at Combined Military Hospital Lahore as School of Nursing. It was shifted to Armed Forces Medical College (Now AFPGMI) in 1959. To meet the growing need for better qualified and educated nurses, a four-year Bachelors in Nursing Degree program was started in 2005. The college of nursing is accredited by the Pakistan Nursing Council and affiliated with National University of Medical Sciences as the degree awarding university.

It offers the following two degree programs:

- Generic Bachelor of Science in Nursing (Generic BSN)
- Post Registered Nurse - Bachelor of Science in Nursing (Post RN BSN)

== See also ==
- National University of Medical Sciences
- Pakistan Army Medical Corps
- College of Physicians and Surgeons Pakistan
- Pakistan Medical and Dental Council
- Pakistan Army
