= Combined Military Hospital Rawalpindi =

Hospital in Punjab, Pakistan

- Part of Pakistan Army Hospitals

Geography
- Location: Rawalpindi, Punjab, Pakistan
- Coordinates: 33°34′52″N 73°02′50″E

Organisation
- Care system: Pakistan Army Medical Corps; Federal Government
- Type: Teaching Military Hospital
- Affiliated university: Army Medical College, PMC, NUMS, CPSP
- Network: Combined Military Hospitals

Services
- Standards: ISO 9001:2015
- Emergency department: Level I Trauma Center
- Beds: 1000

History
- Founded: 1859

Links
- Lists: Hospitals in Pakistan
- Other links: List of hospitals in Lahore

The Combined Military Hospital Rawalpindi is a tertiary care military hospital in Rawalpindi. It is the largest hospital owned and operated by the Pakistan Army and Pakistan Armed Forces. It provides specialized treatment to the armed forces personnel and their immediate families.

== Hospital facilities ==
It is an A Class Combined Military Hospital. It is the chief medical hospital of the cantonment area of Rawalpindi, along with being a Military Hospital for the Armed Forces of Pakistan.

This hospital primarily provides surgical care and serves personnel of all ranks across the Armed Forces, with a capacity of 1,000 beds.

This hospital offers these services

- General Medicine
- General Surgery
- Spine Surgery
- Neurosurgery
- Ear, Nose and Throat
- Eye
- Thoracic Surgery
- Vascular Surgery
- Laproscopic Surgery
- Facio-maxillary Surgery
- Urology
- Breast Surgery
- Burn Centre
- Trauma Centre
- Orthopedic
- Radiation Oncology
- Medical Oncology

There is also a battle casualty/artificial limb section attached to the hospital. This hospital has the only dedicated department of spine surgery in the country. The General Medical Council of UK recognizes the hospital for postgraduate training in different surgical fields. The medical students of Army Medical College are imparted clinical training by the concerned specialists and the professors.

In 2005, a study was conducted which aimed to identify the health hazards posed by the hospital wastes to the sanitary workers of this hospital. The study was to make recommendations for the improvement of the workers' health status.

In 2013, then Chief of Army Staff General Ashfaq Parvez Kayani inaugurated the newly constructed buildings of Outdoor Patient Department (OPD), Emergency Department and Diagnostic Department. This was to increase the combined hospital capacity of CMH and MH to 2500 beds. It was also stated, at the time, the hospital would be able to treat 6000 patients daily.

== See also ==
- Army Medical College
- Pakistan Army Medical Corps
- Military Hospital Rawalpindi
- Combined Military Hospital Lahore
