= Pakistan Army Corps of Service =

Pakistan Army's staff corps for transportation & logistics

ASC Corp Pakistan
- Logo of Pakistan Army Corps of Service
- Active: 1947; 79 years ago
- Country: Pakistan
- Branch: Pakistan Army
- Type: Combat service support
- Role: Administrative and staffing oversight.
- Size: 40 Battalions
- HQ/Garrison: Service Center in Nowshera Cantonment, Khyber-Pakhtunkhwa, Pakistan
- Nickname: ASC
- Motto: Jurrat o Amal
- Colors Identification: Blue, White
- Anniversaries: 1947
- Equipment: Tank transporters Logistics trucks
- Engagements: Nil
- Decorations: Military Decorations of Pakistan military
- Battle honours: Nil
- Website: Facebook– Army Service Corps

Commanders
- Director-General: Maj-Gen. Ahmad

Insignia
- War Flag

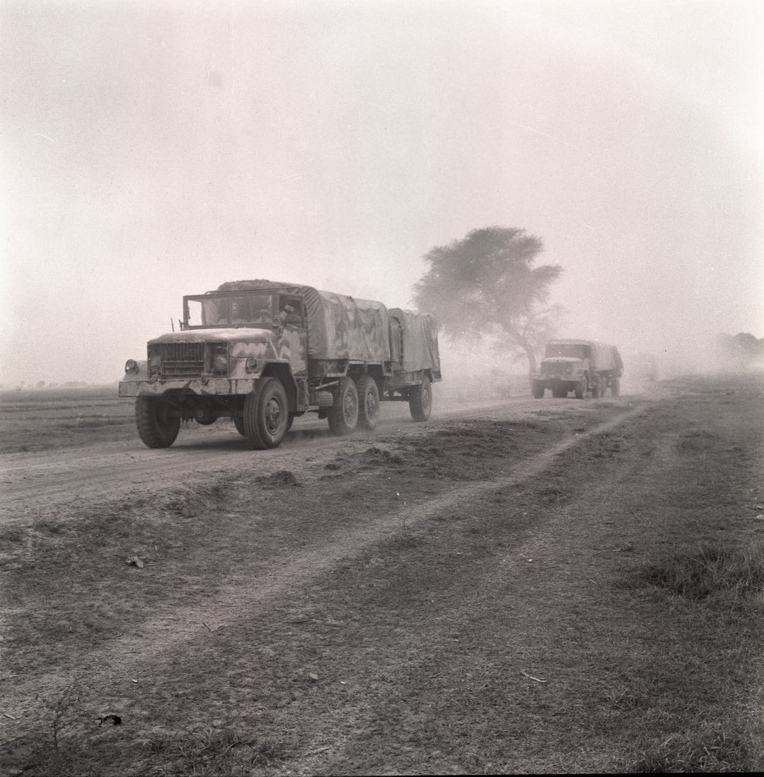
Pakistan Army's ASC trucks moving personnel in 1971.

The Pakistan Army Corps of Service is a military administrative and combat service support branch of the Pakistan Army.

Reporting from its headquarter in Nowshera Cantonment, Khyber-Pakhtunkhwa in Pakistan, the service corps is one of the important military logistics branch in the Pakistani military, and is commanded by its director-general, Maj-Gen. Usman Haq as of 2023.Unlike other arms like infantry, armour, arty, eme, engineers and other supporting arms, ASC comes with branches which is responsible for feeding their troops

== Overview ==
The Army Service Corps is one of the largest military administrative corps that was commissioned into the Pakistan Army from the partition of the former British Indian Army's Service Corps in November 1947. Originally, the service corps was headquartered in Chaklala cantonment with Colonel Abdullah Jan as its commandant until 1950. The service corps is Pakistan army's most senior administrative corps with its mission for management of transportation and military logistics since 1947.

From 1947 till 1957, the British Army provided the crucial training support and education on military logistics its officers who were commissioned in the Army Service Corps.

Since 1966, the Army Service Corps is now stationed in Nowshera along with its Army Service College that provides the necessary training and education and training for the personnel to be commissioned in the corps of service.

The Army Service Corps is commanded by its director-general who is usually at two-star rank, major-general, working directly under the Chief of the General Staff, reporting from its headquarters in Nowshera.
