= Force Command Northern Areas =

- Active: 1948–present
- Country: Pakistan
- Branch: Pakistan Army
- Type: Mountain infantry
- Role: Infantry
- Part of: X Corps (Pakistan)
- Headquarters: Gilgit, Gilgit-Baltistan

Commanders
- Current commander: Major-General Tajdeed Mumtaz
- Ceremonial chief: General Sahir Shamshad Mirza
- Notable Commanders: General Syed Asim Munir General Qamar Javed Bajwa

Force Command Northern Areas is a division size formation of the Pakistan Army. It commands the troops deployed in the Northern Areas of Pakistan. It is a component of X Corps of the Pakistan Army. It is a division sized force commanded by a Major General. Its coat of arms is a snow leopard on a black background.

== Origins of FCNA ==
Following its defeat in the Battle of Turtuk in the war of 1971 and the loss of territory, the Pakistan army felt the need to hold the area more strongly included permanent presence of the army instead of leaving it to the care of Karakorum and Northern Scouts. Consequently, Force Command Northern Area was raised in 1972 as a brigade sized formation responsible for defence of Line of Control in what was then called Northern Areas. The formation was upgraded to a division sized formation in 1975 commanded by a Major General.

== Present Day Order of Battle ==
Brigades	Location
80th Infantry Brigade	Astor
150th Infantry Brigade	Gilgit
323rd Infantry Brigade	Karakoram-Dansam
62nd Infantry Brigade	Skardu
61st Infantry Brigade	U/I Location
Independent Engineering Brigade	U/I Location
Independent Signal Brigade	U/I Location
5 Aviation Squadron	U/I Location

Commanders of Force Command Northern Areas (incomplete list)
Rank and Name	Date Assumed Command	Notes
Brig Safdar Hassan Khan	15 Aug 1972	
Brig Muhammad Asghar	13 Jul 1973	Later a politician and MNA, formed his own faction of Pakistan Muslim Leagure - Junejo
Brig Agha Zulfikar Ali Khan	16 April 1974	
Brigadier Abdul Shakoor Malik	23 Nov 1974	
Maj Gen Muhammad Riaz Khan	15 Jun 1975	
Maj Gen C A Majid	16 Jun 1976	Later Lt Gen
Maj Gen Nishat Ahmad	Jan 1978	
Maj Gen Muhammad Aslam Shah	July 1979	Later Lt Gen
Maj Gen Imtiaz Warraich, SJ	June 1980	Later Lt Gen
Maj Gen Pirdad Khan, SJ	June 1982	Later Lt Gen
Maj Gen Safdar Ali Khan	May 1984	
Maj Gen Humayun Khan Bangash	July 1986	Later Lt Gen
Maj Gen Ayaz Ahmad	Nov 1987	Later Lt Gen
Maj Gen Irshadullah Tarrar	Mar 1989	
Maj Gen Zahir ul Islam Abbasi	May 1991	Launched the disastrous operation Chullung operation in Aug 1992 leading to huge losses to1 AK and killing of Brigade Commander
Maj Gen Fazal Ghafoor		
Maj Gen M Aziz Khan		Later General and Chairman Joint chiefs of Staff Committee
Maj Gen Ali Jan Aurakzai		Later Lt Gen and Governor of NWFP
Maj Gen Javed Hassan		Commander during the Kargil War 1999
Maj Gen Safder Hussain		Later Lt Gen
Maj Gen Nadeem Ahmed		Later Lt Gen
Maj Gen Tahir Mahmood		
Maj Gen Mohsin Kamal		Later Lt Gen
Maj Gen Muzzamil Hussain		Later Lt Gen
Maj Gen Qamar Javed Bajwa		Later General and Chief of Army Staff
Maj Gen Ikram-ul-Haq		Later Lt Gen
Maj Gen Hafiz Masroor Ahmad		
Maj Gen Syed Asim Munir		Later Field Marshal and Chief of Army Staff
Maj Gen Saqib Mahmood Malik		Later Lt Gen
Maj Gen Ehsan Mahmood		
Maj Gen Jawwad Ahmed Qazi		
Maj Gen Kashif Khalil, SJ		Earned Sitara-e-Jurrat in 1999.
Maj Gen Syed Imtiaz Hussain Gillani	September 2024	
Maj Gen Tajdeed Mumtaz	September 2026	
