= Military Hospital Rawalpindi =

Pakistani hospital

- Part of Pakistan Army Hospitals

Geography
- Location: Rawalpindi, Punjab, Pakistan
- Coordinates: 33.5940°N 73.0436°E

Organisation
- Care system: Federal Government
- Type: Teaching Military Hospital
- Affiliated university: Army Medical College, Pakistan Medical and Dental Council, NUMS, General Medical Council, College of Physicians and Surgeons Pakistan

Services
- Standards: ISO 9001
- Emergency department: Level II Trauma Center
- Beds: 1200

History
- Founded: 1857 (As British Indian Military Hospital)

Links
- Lists: Hospitals in Pakistan

The Pak Emirates Military Hospital Rawalpindi, commonly known as Military Hospital Rawalpindi, is a public hospital in Rawalpindi, Pakistan. It is the second largest hospital of the Pakistan Armed Forces after CMH Rawalpindi, being one of the hospitals in the Pakistan Army with an ISO certification, located in the city of Rawalpindi. Before independence in 1947 it was called the British Indian Military Hospital Rawalpindi.

Its commandant/CEO is a serving Major General of Army Medical Corps. It has one deputy commandant with the rank of brigadier and two assistant commandants (administrators) with the rank of Colonel. Its family wing is looked after by a Lady Medical Officer with the rank of brigadier. It is an affiliated hospital of the Army Medical College and Armed Forces Post Graduate Medical Institute, Rawalpindi. It is also a teaching institution for nurses and paramedics.

The hospital, established in 1857, has 1200 beds for in-patient treatment. The hospital comprises three medical units, Departments of Surgery, Family Medicine, Dermatology, Pediatrics, Gynecology and Obstetrics, and Department of Intensive Care Units. The bed occupancy rate is about 95 percent.

== History ==
The hospital was established in 1887 as "Indian Troops Hospital".It was a 50 bedded facility for Indian military troops. At the time of independence the hospital grew to 200 beds and was designated as the "Military Hospital". Hospital was renamed as "Pak Emirates Military Hospital" in July 2018 after a grant of $108 million given by the Government of the United Arab Emirates as part of the development program called United Arab Emirates Pakistan Assistance Program.

On 23 June 2019, the hospital suffered damage due to oxygen cylinder blast .

== Recognition ==
- The General Medical Council of the UK recognizes the hospital for postgraduate training in many disciplines. The hospital looks after a variety of patients and the medical students of this college are given practical clinical training by the various specialists and professors.
- Recognised by the College of Physicians and Surgeons Pakistan.
- Recognised by Pakistan Medical and Dental Council.

The hospital also provides tertiary care facilities. The hospital is still the largest, despite its Radiology, Ophthalmology and Psychiatry departments are now independent units with their own administrative set up but no physical boundaries.
