= Combined Military Hospital Lahore =

Military Hospital in Punjab, Pakistan

- Part of Pakistan Army Hospitals

Geography
- Location: Punjab, Pakistan
- Coordinates: 31°32′27″N 74°22′22″E

Organisation
- Care system: Pakistan Army Medical Corps; Federal Government
- Type: Teaching Military Hospital
- Affiliated university: CMH Lahore Medical And Dental College; Pakistan Medical and Dental Council; National University of Medical Sciences; College of Physicians and Surgeons Pakistan
- Network: Combined Military Hospitals

Services
- Standards: ISO 9001:2015
- Emergency department: Level II Trauma Center
- Beds: 1100

History
- Founded: 1854 (As British Military Hospital)

Links
- Lists: Hospitals in Pakistan
- Other links: List of hospitals in Lahore

The Combined Military Hospital Lahore is a tertiary care teaching hospital operated by the Pakistan Army. Its primary function is to provide specialized medical treatment to armed forces personnel, their dependents (immediate families), as well as the general public. It is headed by a Major General from the Army Medical Corps of the Pakistan Army.

== Recognized hospital ==
Combined Military Hospital, Lahore is a recognized hospital by the College of Physicians and Surgeons of Pakistan.

== History ==
The hospital was established in 1854 as a British Military Hospital (BMH) by the British military as a specialized treatment center for British officers serving in the subcontinent. In 1927, the British military raised another hospital nearby named the Indian Military Hospital (IMH). The BMH and IMH served as treatment facilities for British and Indian troops serving the British, respectively. It was not until 1943 that the British decided to amalgamate both hospitals into one contiguous unit (primarily due to administrative issues) and named it the Combined Military Hospital.

In 1947, after Pakistan's Independence, the Combined Military Hospital was handed over to the Pakistan Army. It was a 200-bed hospital at that time. The need for increased medical facilities and the growing population mandated several expansions of the hospital.

In 1982, its capacity was increased to 800 beds and was upgraded to a Class A hospital. It saw further expansion in 2004 with the addition of 200 more beds, increasing its capacity to 1000 beds. The construction of new CMH blocks with an 1100-bed capacity has been completed, with the addition of Oncology Department & Hands & Upper Limb Surgery (HULS) Department. CMH Lahore is a level-5 (Tertiary Care Hospital) with state-of-the-art facilities equipped with the latest modern equipment. CMH Lahore has been commanded by Maj Gen Adil Khan, Brig Asghar Choudhry, Brig Sehar Zameer Siddiqui, Brig Rahat, Brig Naseer Hussain (2014), Maj Gen Qamar Ul Haq Noor Chaudhry (2015), Maj Gen Muhammad Aleem (2017), Brig Nasir Javed Malik (2019), Brig Amir Bin Tahir (2020), Maj Gen Adil Husnain (2022), and presently commanded by Maj Gen Muhammad Rafique (2024).

== Hospital facilities ==
Being a Level-5 (Class A) Tertiary Care teaching hospital, it serves as the principal medical hospital for Armed Forces personnel in the Lahore region. Although, the hospital's primary task is to cater military officers, soldiers, and their families; it provides equal healthcare facilities to civilians. It is a teaching hospital affiliated with CMH Lahore Medical & Dental College, College of Nursing (CoN), Institute of DPT, Allied Health Sciences & School of Paramedics for undergraduate courses (MBBS, BDS, DPT, AHP, MLT, Nurses & Paramedics). It is recognised & accredited by Pakistan Medical & Dental Council (PMDC) & College of Physicians & Surgeons Pakistan (CPSP) for postgraduate training in various disciplines/ Specialities (both FCPS & MCPS).

Some of the specialized healthcare units/ Deptts available in the hospital are:

- Trauma center
- GP Clinics
- General Medical & Surgical OPDs
- Staff Surgeon
- Center for Veterans & Shuhadas
- Accident & Emergency Deptt
- Emergency Medicine Deptt
- Department of Family Medicine
- Department of General Medicine
- Department of Gastroenterology
- Department of Pulmonology
- Department of Neurology
- Department of Rheumatology
- Department of Nephrology
- Dialysis Department
- Department of Psychiatry
- Department of Dermatology
- Department of Medical Oncology
- Department of Radiation Oncology
- Department of Rehab Medicine
- Medical Intensive Care Unit
- Diabetic Clinics
- General Surgery Department
- Department of Anaesthesiology
- Department of Neuro-Surgery
- Department of Ophthalmology
- Department of Ear, Nose & Throat
- One Stop Breast Cancer Clinic
- Thoracic Surgery Department
- Surgical Intensive Care Unit
- Orthopedic Surgery Department
- Plastic Surgery Department
- Vascular Surgery Department
- Laproscopic Surgery
- Department of Urology
- Hand and Upper Limb Surgery (HULS)
- Modular Operation Theaters (OTs)
- Department of Gynae & Obstetrics
- Antenatal Clinics
- Department of Paediatrics
- Department of Neonatology
- Vaccination & Immunization Center
- Oral and Maxillofacial surgery
- Pathology Department
- Haematology Deptt
- Chemical Pathology Deptt
- Histopathology Deptt
- Microbiology Deptt
- Immunology Deptt
- Blood Bank
- Radiology Dept: MRI, CT Scan,
- Ultrasounds, Digital Radiography, Mammography, Fluoroscopy, Dexa Scan
- Department of Interventional
- Radiology (IR)
- Department of Public Health
- Military Dental Center
- (Maxillofacial, Orthodontics, Operative Dentistry, Prosthetics &
- Paeds Dentistry)
- Army Cardiac Hospital (ACH)
- Department of Cardiac Surgery
- Department of Electrophysiology
- Medical Store Department
- Pharmacies

== Training / teaching facilities ==
The hospital serves as a teaching hospital to CMH Lahore Medical And Dental College. Most of the clinical faculty of the medical college are doctors of the Army Medical Corps serving in the hospital.

- Medicine
- Pediatrics
- Surgery
- Orthopedic Surgery
- Gynecology & Obstetrics
- Ear, Nose, Throat
- Psychiatry
- Anaesthesiology
- Dermatology
- Chemical Pathology
- Histopathology
- Radiology
- Vascular Surgery
- Pulmonology
- Neurology
- Ophthalmology
- Emergency Medicine
- Medical & Radiation Oncology
- Neurosurgery
- Hand & Upper Limb Surgery
- Thoracic Surgery
- Urology
- Gastroenterology

== See also ==
- Pakistan Army Medical Corps
- Pakistan Army
