= Pakistan Army Medical Corps =

Pakistan Army's staff corps for health & medicines

- سپاه طبی فوج پاکستان
- Logo of Pakistan Army Medical Corps
- Active: 1947; 79 years ago
- Country: Pakistan
- Branch: Pakistan Army
- Type: Combined and combat support service
- Role: Administrative and staffing oversight.
- Size: Varies
- HQ/Garrison: Abbottabad Cantonment, Khyber-Pakhtunkhwa in Pakistan
- Nickname: AMC
- Motto: Allah shafi
- Colors Identification: Red
- Anniversaries: 1947
- Engagements: Military history of Pakistan

Commanders
- Surgeon-General: Lt-Gen. Arshad Naseem
- Notable commanders: Lt-Gen. Nigar Johar; Lt-Gen. Wajid Ali Khan; Maj-Gen. Shahida Malik

Insignia
- War Flag

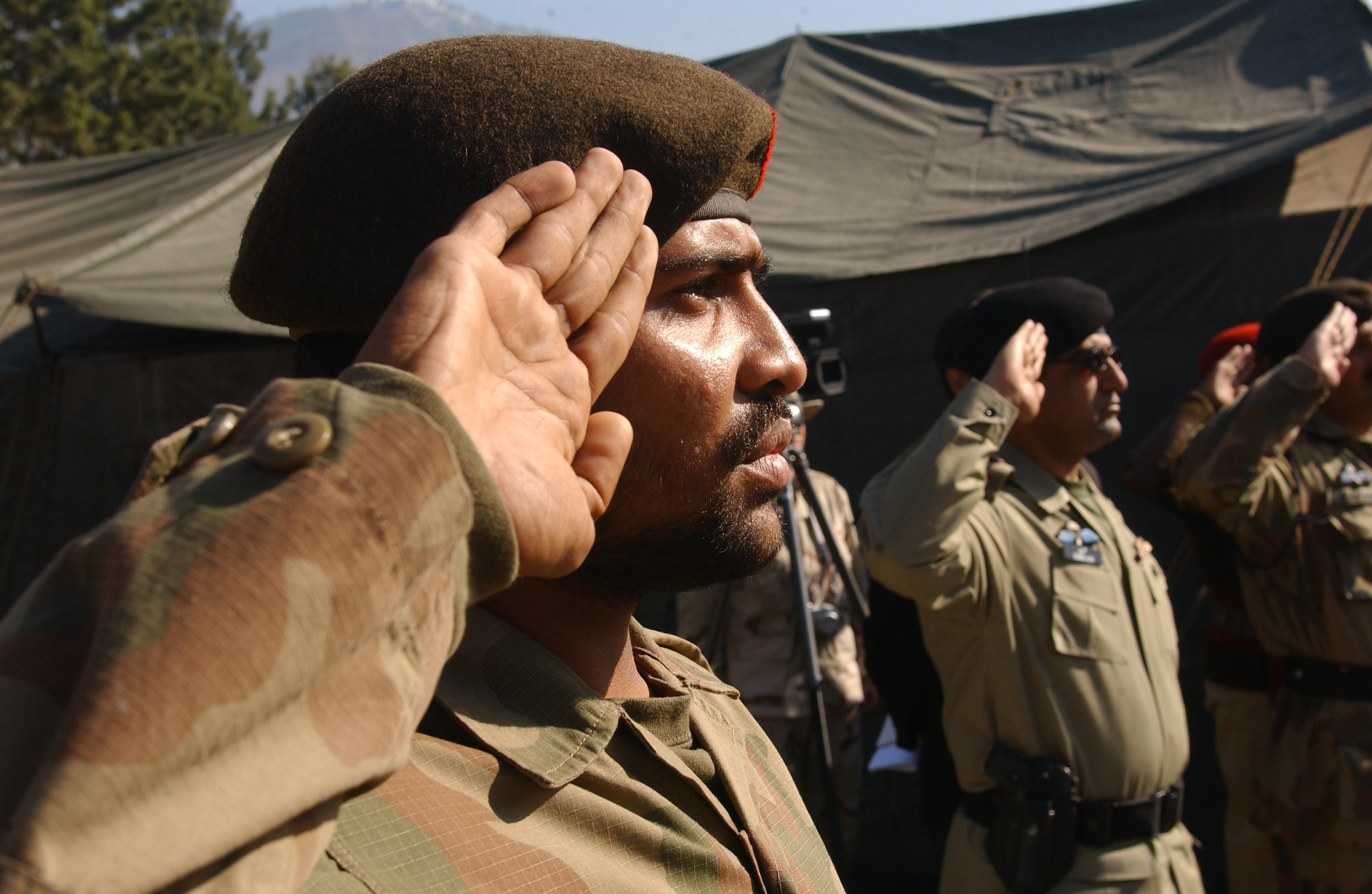
The Pakistan Army troops from 67th Medical Btn. saluting to their U.S. Army counterparts in 2005.

The Army Medical Corps is a military administrative, combined arms, and the combat support branch of the Pakistan Army. The AMC mainly concerns with the military medicine and move of army in the war providing medical and combat support. The medical corps also leads a role in combat disease outbreaks and researching medicines on behalf of Government of Pakistan.

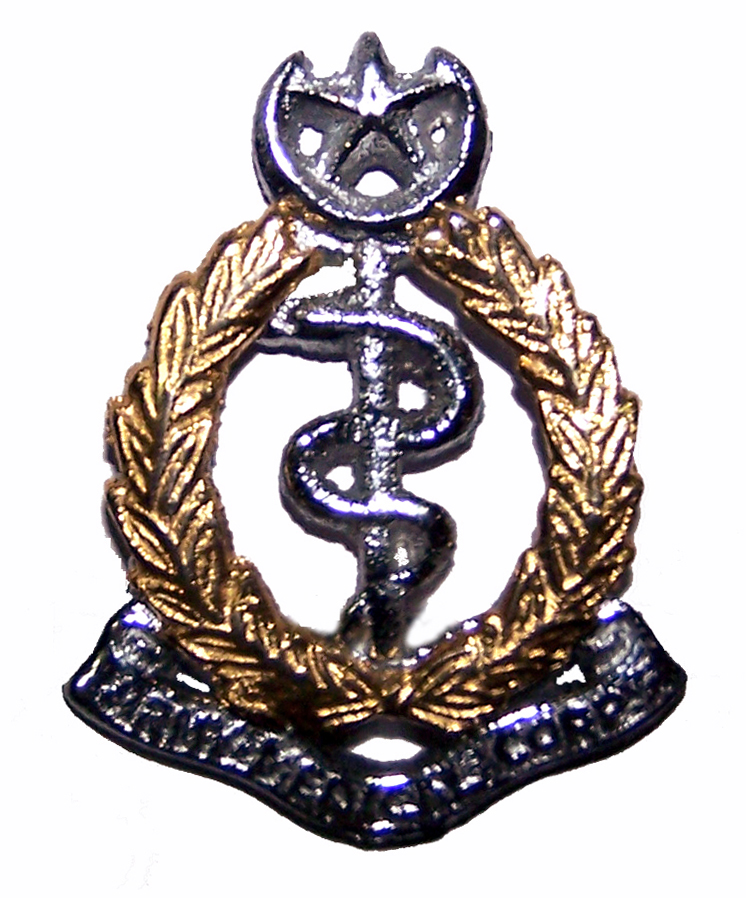
Badge of Pakistan Army Medical Corps

The Pakistani AMC is not to be confused with the Indian AMC. Nevertheless, both have common roots tracing back to British raj, as they were preceded by the former British Indian Army's Medical Corps until 1947.

== Mission ==
To support the Army in all its combat operations, so that the move of the Army is facilitated offensive operations and the move of the enemy is impeded while own Army in defense. Medical Corps Doctors are also responsible for the survivability of the Army, serving each and every soldier both in the battle field and back in the temporary and permanent care hospitals."

== Induction ==
1. Medical cadets from Army Medical College, CMH Lahore Medical College, CMH Kharian Medical College, CMH Bahawalpur Medical College, CMH Karachi (Malir) medical college, CMH Multan Medical College and CMH Quetta Medical College after completion of basic military training at Pakistan Military Academy join this corps.

2. The civil medical college graduated students / specialists are also inducted into Army Medical Corps. Divided into two categories, SSRC and PTC, they undergo basic military training at Pakistan Military Academy for 22 weeks.

3. Soldiers in nursing and other trades of Army Medical Corps cadre undergo their basic military training and nursing classes at AMC centre Abbottabad and subsequent professional courses at AFPGMI.

== Aims and objectives ==
Besides their primary role in serving the Pakistan Army both in battle and in the conditions of peace, the Pakistan Army Medical Corps undertakes the following peace time activities:

- Provision of health services to the civilian community through a vast chain of Combined Military Hospitals (CMHs);
- Combating situations of disaster by providing rehabilitation services; and
- Establishing "health centers" in remote locations so that all Pakistanis can reach health facilities easily.

== History ==
Before the First World War, the men of the Indian Army depended on their regimental hospitals for their medical treatment. In October 1918, Station Hospitals were sanctioned for the Indian troops to help improve the provision of services. The Indian Hospital Corps (IHC) was initially divided into ten Division Companies, which corresponded to the ten existing Military Divisions in India and Burma. They were located at Peshawar, Rawalpindi, Lahore, Quetta, Mhow, Poona, Meerut, Lucknow, Secunderabad and Rangoon. After the independence of Pakistan in 1947, the Pakistan Army raised its own medical corps.

Since then the Pakistan Army Medical Corps has provided services in the majority of health related fields. In the past personnel were taken from Army Medical College in Rawalpindi, but with the need of more health professionals in the army as well as an increased demand for their services, the corps has begun to recruit civilians medical personnel, who then attend short military courses.

== Combined Military Hospitals ==
Combined Military Hospitals (CMHs) are the base hospitals of the Pakistan Armed Forces, which are situated in various cantonments. These hospitals are run by the doctors of Pakistan's Army Medical Corps. The administration is carried out by the General Duty Medical Officers (GDMOs) while the patients' management and care is primarily the responsibility of the doctors of specialist cadre.

The CMHs are categorized into three major parts depending on their functions, governing and physical body and role as Class 'A', Class 'B' and Class 'C' Hospitals.

- Class 'A' hospitals
  - CMH Abbottabad
  - CMH Rawalpindi
  - CMH Kharian
  - CMH Lahore
  - CMH Peshawar
  - CMH Multan
  - CMH Quetta
  - CMH Malir Cantonment Karachi
  - CMH Hyderabad
  - CMH Pano Aqil
- Class 'B' hospitals
  - CMH Gujranwala
  - CMH Sargodha
  - CMH Jhelum
  - CMH Sialkot
  - CMH Nowshera
  - CMH Muzaffarabad
  - CMH Kohat
- Class 'C' hospitals
  - CMH Attock
  - CMH Bannu
  - CMH Chorre
  - CMH Thall
  - CMH Bahawalpur
  - CMH Mailsi
  - CMH Sibi
  - CMH Khuzdar
  - CMH Murree
  - CMH Zhob
  - CMH Skardu
  - CMH D I Khan
  - CMH Tarbela
  - CMH Gilgit
  - CMH Mardan
  - CMH Mangla
  - CMH Risalpur
  - CMH Rawalakot
  - CMH Chunian
  - CMH Bahawalnagar
  - CMH Okara

== United Nations and the Pakistan Army Medical Corps ==
The Pakistan Army Medical Corps is one of the largest contributors of health services to United Nations. Since 1960 Pakistan has been actively involved in most of the UN peacekeeping, rehabilitation and health providing missions and today stands at the top with 10,175 troops and observers serving in current missions. The Pakistan Army Medical Corps is a major part of it. Some of the largest contributions have been in Somalia, Sierra Leone, Bosnia, Congo and Liberia. In the wake of the new world power equilibrium a more complex security environment has emerged. It is characterised by growing national power politics and state implosions which have necessitated involvement of the United Nations peace keeping forces for conflict resolution.

The United Nations has been undertaking peace keeping operations since its inception, but the need for employment of peace keeping forces has increased significantly since the Gulf War. In 1992 there were 11,000 Blue Berets deployed around the world; by the end of the year the figure rose to 52,000. Presently it exceeds 80,000 troops.

- UN Operation in Congo (ONUC) 1960–1964
- UN Security Force in New Guinea, West Irian (UNSF) 1962–1963
- UN Yemen Observer Mission Yemen (UNYOM) 1963–1964
- UN Transition Assistance Group in Namibia (UNTAG) 1989–1990
- UN Iraq–Kuwait Observer Mission (UNIKOM) 1991–2003
- UN Mission in Haiti (UNMIH) 1993–1996
- UN Transitional Authority in Cambodia (UNTAC) 1992–1993
- UN Operations in Somalia (UNOSOM) 1992–1995
- UN Protection Forces in Bosnia (UNPROFOR) 1992–1995
- UN Observer Mission for Rwanda (UNAMIR) 1993–1996
- UN Verification Mission in Angola (UNAVEM III) 1995–1997
- UN Transitional Administration for Eastern Slavonia (UNTAES) 1996–1997
- UN Mission of Observers in Prevlaka (UNMOP) 1996–2002
- UN Assistance Mission in Sierra Leone (UNAMSIL) 2001–2005
- UN Transitional Administration in East Timor (UNTAET) 1999-to-date

The table below shows the current deployment of Pakistani Forces in UN Peacekeeping missions.

Start of operation	Name of operation	Location		Conflict	Contribution
1999	United Nations Organization Stabilization Mission in the Democratic Republic of the Congo (MONUSCO)	(Democratic Republic of the Congo)	Democratic Republic of Congo	Second Congo War	3,556 troops
2003	United Nations Mission in Liberia (UNMIL)	(Liberia)	Liberia	Second Liberian Civil War	2,741 troops
2004	United Nations Operation in Burundi ONUB	(Burundi)	Burundi	Burundi Civil War	1,185 troops
2004	United Nations Operation in Côte d'Ivoire (UNOCI)	(Ivory Coast)	Côte d'Ivoire	Civil war in Côte d'Ivoire	1,145 troops
2005	United Nations Mission in the Sudan (UNMIS)	(Sudan)	Sudan	Second Sudanese Civil War	1,542 troops
	Staff/observers				191 observers

- The total number of troops serving currently in peacekeeping missions is 10,173 (as of March 2007).

== National relief works ==
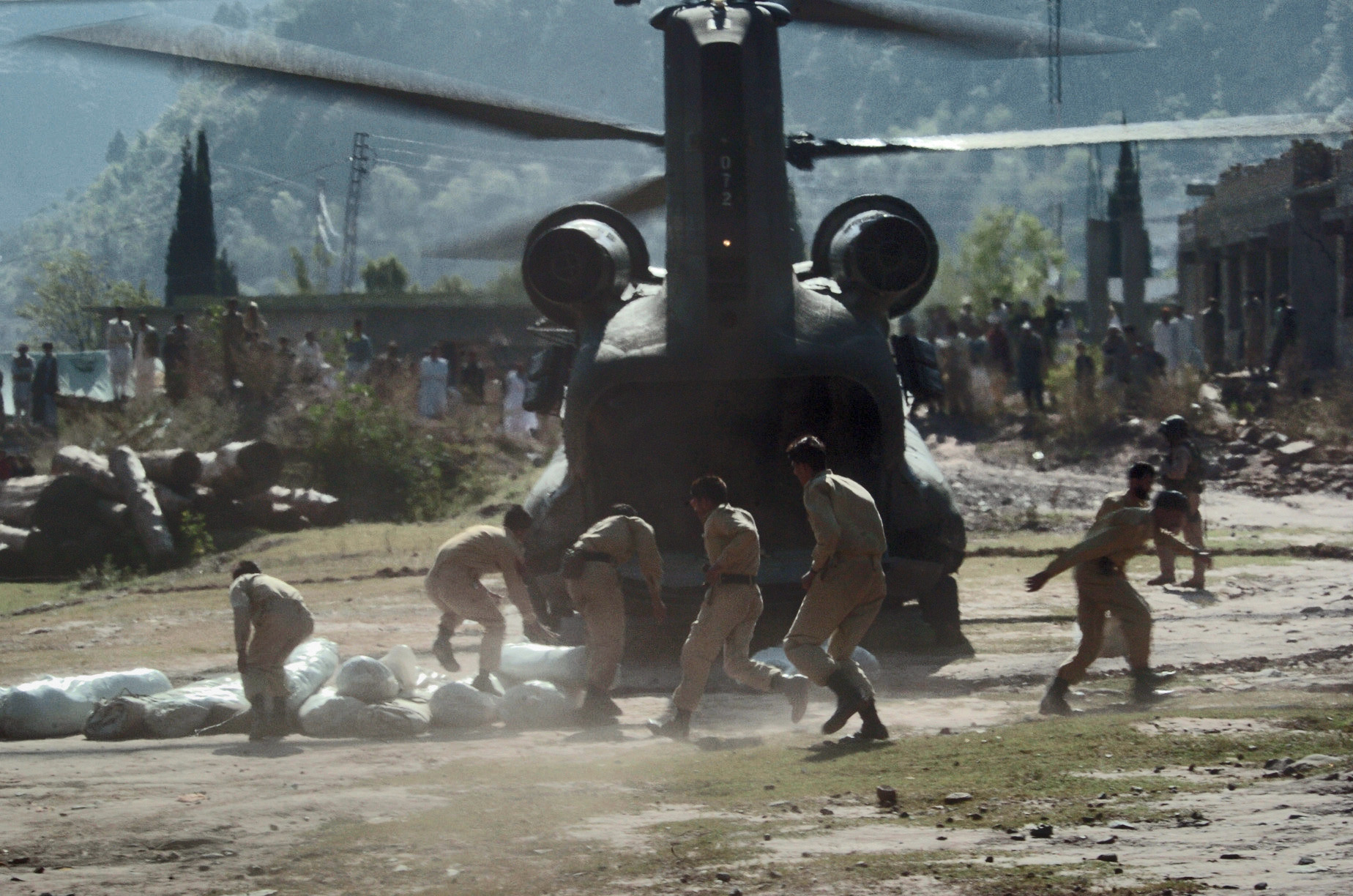
Pakistani soldiers carrying tents away from a U.S. CH-47 Chinook helicopter, October 19, 2005

In times of natural disaster, such as the great floods of 1992 or the devastating October 2005 earthquake, army engineers, medical and logistics personnel, and the armed forces have played a major role in bringing relief and supplies.

The army has also engaged in extensive corporate activities. Most of these enterprises, such as stud and dairy farms, were for the army's own use, but others, such as bakeries, security services and banking, perform functions in the local civilian economy. Army factories have produced such goods as sugar, fertilizer, and brass castings which have then been sold to civilian consumers, albeit at prices higher than those charged from military personnel.

Several army organizations operate in the commercial sector across the country. For example, the National Logistics Cell was responsible for trucking food and other goods across the country; the Frontier Works Organization built the Karakorum Highway to China; and the Special Communication Organization maintained communications networks in remote parts of Pakistan.

The Pakistan Army has been involved in relief activities not only in Pakistan but also in many other countries of the world, such as the relief activities after Bangladesh was recently hit by floods. The Army also dispatched relief to Indonesia, Bangladesh and Sri Lanka after they were hit by the 2004 Indian Ocean earthquake and the resulting tsunami. Both the Pakistan Army and Navy sent ships and helicopters to assist in the tsunami relief operation.

The Army Medical Corps are responsible for providing medical facilities and organizing free medical camps in under privileged tribal areas such as the Federally Administered Tribal Areas in the North-West Frontier Province (now Khyber Pakhtunkhwa). The medical corps provided health-care facilities to more than 12,000 people affected by the 2010 floods in Pakistan.

== Army doctors and international disasters ==
- Pakistan Army provided humanitarian assistance to the community in the form of daily free medical treatment at Tubmanburg and the medical outreach initiatives in 2008.
- Pakistan Army Field Hospital which was deployed at Bhandaria, Barisal, Bangladesh for relief operations after Cyclone Sidr worked day and night to mitigate the suffering of the flood affected people earning goodwill for Pakistan.
- Pakistan Field Hospital has been established at Lamno, which is the District Headquarters of Aceh Jaya. Lamno is 80 km South West of Bande Aceh.
- Pakistan Army Field Hospital which proceeded to Indonesia to carry out relief and rescue operation had treated thousands of patients since their arrival on in earthquake hit areas of District Klaten in Central Java in Indonesia.

== Units ==
- 4 Medical Battalion
- 5 Medical Battalion
- 44 Medical Battalion
- 61 Medical Battalion
- 63 Medical Battalion
- 64 Medical Battalion
- 65 Medical Battalion
- 66 Medical Battalion
- 67 Medical Battalion
- 68 Medical Battalion
- 69 Medical Battalion
- 70 Medical Battalion
- 71 Medical Battalion
- 72 Medical Battalion
- 73 Medical Battalion
- 74 Medical Battalion
- 75 Medical Battalion
- 76 Medical Battalion
- 77 Medical Battalion
- 78 Medical Battalion
- 86 Medical Battalion
- 102 Medical Battalion
- 123 Medical Battalion
- 130 Medical Battalion
- 132 Medical Battalion
- 134 Medical Battalion
- 136 Medical Battalion
- 137 Medical Battalion
- 141 Medical Battalion
- 142 Medical Battalion
- 144 Medical Battalion (Siachen Healers)

=== Mountain units ===
- 1 Mountain Medical Battalion
- 2 Mountain Medical Battalion
- 3 Mountain Medical Battalion
- 4 Mountain Medical Battalion
- 5 Mountain Medical Battalion

== See also ==
- Military Hospital Rawalpindi
- Pakistan Army
- Pakistan Army Corps of Engineers
- Abbottabad
