= Shahida Malik =

Pakistani general

Shahida Malik HI(M) SI(M)
- Born: Shahida Malik; Karachi, Sindh Province Pakistan
- Military career
- Allegiance: Pakistan
- Branch: Pakistan Army
- Service years: 1969-2004
- Rank: Major-General
- Nickname: "Lady General"
- Unit: Pakistan Army Medical Corps
- Commands: Inspector General Hospitals; Vice Principal Army Medical College; Deputy Commander, AMC; National Institute of Health
- Awards: Hilal-e-Imtiaz; Sitara-i-Imtiaz

Shahida Malik HI(M), SI(M) (Urdu: شاهدہ ملک;), is a retired major general of the Pakistan Army Medical Corps. She was the first woman general in the Pakistan Army.

== Early life and education ==
She was born in the Jhatla village of district Chakwal. She graduated with her MBBS degree from Fatima Jinnah Medical College, Lahore and got selected for Army Medical Corps in 1970.

== Career ==
Malik was promoted to Major General rank on 17 June 2002 on the orders of the then Chief of Army Staff, Pervez Musharraf. She was appointed the Inspector-General Hospitals as well as deputy commander of the Pakistan Army Medical Corps before retiring in 2004.
