= Army Medical College =

Medical college in Rawalpindi, Punjab, Pakistan

- درسگاہ طبی فوجی
- Motto: Ministrare Et Salvare
- Type: Medical school
- Established: 1977; 49 years ago
- Affiliations: National University of Medical Sciences
- Principal: Maj Gen Khuram Haq Nawaz
- Location: Rawalpindi, Punjab, Pakistan
- Colors: Maroon
- Mascot: MC
- Website: https://amcollege.edu.pk

The Pakistan Army Medical College (AMC College) is a military medical college located in Rawalpindi, Punjab, Pakistan. The medical college provides medical and dental education to its cadets before their commissioning in the Pakistan Army Medical Corps.

== History ==
In 1977, the Pakistan Army's Corps of Education established the direct military unit as a residential institution for imparting undergraduate medical, and dental education, established 1998, to the army's cadets. In Pakistan, the program of Bachelor of Medicine, Bachelor of Surgery (MBBS) is pursued rather than the Doctor of Medicine (MD). From 1977 till 1997, the Army Medical College was affiliated with the biology department of the Quaid-i-Azam University (Qau) for its degree accreditation. In 1998, the college was made constituent college of the National University of Sciences and Technology (Pakistan) (NUST) until 2015 when the school was made constituent to the National University of Medical Sciences (NUMS).

== Recognition ==
The accreditation and recognition of medical degrees that are awarded by AM College are accredited by the Pakistan Medical and Dental Council (PM&DC) and the College of Physicians and Surgeons (CPSP).

== See also ==
- National University of Medical Sciences
- Pakistan Medical and Dental Council
