= Sajjad Akram =

Pakistani military person

Chairman of Punjab Public Service Commission
- In office 2013–2018

Commander, I Corps Mangla
- In office 2006–2008
- Preceded by: Lt Gen Javed Alam Khan
- Succeeded by: Lt Gen Nadeem Ahmad

Personal details
- Born: April 5, 1954 (age 72) Hyderabad, Sindh
- Education: Pakistan Military Academy; Command and Staff College, Quetta; National Defence College
- Awards: Hilal-i-Imtiaz

Military service
- Allegiance: Pakistan
- Branch/service: Pakistan Army
- Years of service: 1971 — 2010
- Rank: Lieutenant General
- Unit: 11 Baloch Regiment
- Commands: Commanding Officer of 69 Baloch Regiment; Commanding Officer of 42 Baloch Regiment; Brigade Commander of 6 Azad Kashmir Brigade; General Officer Commanding of 37th Infantry Division; Force Commander, UNAMSIL; Director General National Accountability Bureau; Commander I Coprs Mangla; Chairman ERRA

Sajjad Akram is a retired general of the Pakistan Army who had commanded the I Corps, situated at Mangla. Following retirement, he served as Chairman of the Punjab Public Service Commission (PPSC).

== Early life and education ==
Akram was born on 5 April 1954 in Hyderabad, Sindh. He is a graduate of the Command and Staff College, Quetta and the National Defence College in Islamabad.

== Military career ==
During his military career, he has served at various capacities at home and abroad. He commanded two Infantry battalions, 69 Baloch Regiment and 42 Baloch Regiment. As a brigadier, he commanded the 6 Azad Kashmir Brigade. Upon promotion to major general, he led 37th Infantry Division. In October 2003, Akram was appointed as Force Commander of the United Nations Mission in Sierra Leone (UNAMSIL), a post he held until September 2005.

He also held numerous staff appointments, including general staff officer - 3 and brigade major of an infantry brigade. As his instructional appointment, he was a platoon commander of one of platoons at Pakistan Military Academy and Directing Staff at Command and Staff College Quetta. He also served as Chief of Staff of a strike corps, one of the prominent appointment within a corp.

He held the office of Director General National Accountability Bureau. In 2006, he was appointed Corps Commander of I Corps, Mangla, one of the Pakistan Army’s principal strike formations. Later, he led the Earthquake Reconstruction and Rehabilitation Authority.

He retired from active military service in 2010.
