= Javed Alam Khan =

Pakistani military person

Commander I Corps Mangla
- In office April 2002 – April 2006
- Preceded by: Lt Gen Ghulam Mustafa
- Succeeded by: Lt Gen Sajjad Akram

Personal details
- Relations: Shamim Alam Khan (Brother)
- Education: Pakistan Military Academy; Command and Staff College Quetta
- Awards: Hilal-i-Imtiaz (Military)

Military service
- Allegiance: Pakistan
- Branch/service: Pakistan Army
- Years of service: 1971 — 2006
- Rank: Lieutenant General
- Unit: 24th Cavalry (Frontier Force)
- Commands: Military Adviser at High Commission of Pakistan United Kingdom; Inter-Services Intelligence; Commander I Corps

Javed Alam Khan is a retired general of the Pakistan Army who was Corps Commander of I Corps, a key strike formation based in Mangla, from 2002 to 2006.

== Personal life ==
Khan was born in a military family. All nine of his brothers joined the Pakistan Armed Forces. Notably, his brother Wing Cdr Aftab Alam Khan was awarded Sitara-e-Jurat in the 1965 War. Another of his brother, Shamim Alam Khan rose to the rank of General.

== Military career ==
Khan was commissioned in the 24th Cavalry (Frontier Force) via 44th PMA Long Course.

His major appointments included Instructor at Armoured School, Military Adviser at High Commission of Pakistan United Kingdom. He was also posted at the Inter-Services Intelligence. As a major general, he commanded an infantry division.

In April 2002, he was promoted to lieutenant general and appointed as Corps Commander, I Corps. He held this post until his retirement in April 2006, handing over to Lieutenant General Sajjad Akram.

== Post-retirement ==
After retirement, Khan was Chief Executive Officer of Fauji Cement Company Ltd and Fauji Kabirwala Power Company. He is an Independent Director on the board of Attock Petroleum Limited.

== Awards ==
Khan was awarded the Hilal-i-Imtiaz (Military), the second-highest military award in Pakistan.
