= Azmat Bakhsh Awan =

- Born: British India
- Military career
- Allegiance: Pakistan
- Branch: Pakistan Army
- Service years: 1947–1976
- Rank: Lieutenant General
- Unit: Pakistan Army Aviation Corps
- Commands: I Corps (1974–March 1976)

Azmat Bakhsh Awan, sometimes referred to as A. B. Awan, is a retired lieutenant general of the Pakistan Army and a former Pakistani diplomat who commanded the I Corps at Mangla between 1974 and 1976. He was one of the seven senior lieutenant generals who were superseded when Prime Minister Zulfikar Ali Bhutto appointed Zia-ul-Haq as Chief of Army Staff in March 1976. He later served as Pakistan's Ambassador to Sweden from 1978 to 1985.

== Military career ==
Awan was among the earliest army officers of independent Pakistan to be trained as a pilot. In 1950, the Pakistan Army launched its first Army Aviation Pilot Courses with the No. 1 Air Observation Post Flight of the Pakistan Air Force at PAF Station Chaklala near Rawalpindi, and then-Captain Azmat Bakhsh Awan qualified through this programme. He is considered as the pioneer of Pakistan Army Aviation Corps.

By the early 1970s, Awan had risen to the three-star rank of lieutenant general. In 1974, he was appointed General Officer Commanding of Pakistan's I Corps, the country's oldest strike corps, then headquartered in Mangla cantonment, Azad Kashmir. On 1 November 1974, Awan received Prime Minister Zulfikar Ali Bhutto and Chief of Army Staff General Tikka Khan at the Tilla Firing Ranges near Jhelum for an armoured regiment demonstration, ahead of Bhutto's investiture the same day as Colonel-in-Chief of the Armoured Corps at Kharian cantonment.

Following the end of Bhutto's decision to end the tenure of the outgoing chief, General Tikka Khan, on 29 February 1976, several lieutenant generals were considered for the appointment of Chief of Army Staff. Awan was fourth in the order of seniority among the eight lieutenant generals then serving, listed after generals Muhammad Shariff, Akbar Khan and Aftab Ahmad Khan, and ahead of Agha Ibrahim Akram, Majeed Malik, Ghulam Jilani Khan and Muhammad Zia-ul-Haq.

On 1 March 1976, Bhutto instead appointed the most junior of the eight, Lieutenant General Zia-ul-Haq, as chief of army staff, superseding all seven of his seniors, including Awan.

== Diplomatic career ==
After retiring from the army, Awan was appointed by the government of Pakistan as Ambassador of Pakistan to Sweden, with concurrent accreditation to Finland, based in Stockholm. He held the post from 1978 to 1985.
