= Mustafa Khan =

Pakistani military person

Managing Director of Fauji Foundation
- In office 2010–2015

Commander I Corps Mangla
- In office April 2010 – October 2010
- Preceded by: Lt Gen Nadeem Ahmad
- Succeeded by: Lt. Gen. Tariq Khan

Chief of General Staff
- In office October 2008 – April 2010
- Preceded by: Lt. Gen. Salahuddin Satti
- Succeeded by: Lt. Gen. Khalid Shameem Wynne

Personal details
- Education: Pakistan Military Academy
- Awards: Hilal-i-Imtiaz

Military service
- Allegiance: Pakistan
- Branch/service: Pakistan Army
- Rank: Lieutenant General
- Unit: Armoured Corps
- Commands: General Officer Commanding 18th Infantry Division; Chief of General Staff; Commander I Corps Mangla

Muhammad Mustafa Khan is a retired senior officer of the Pakistan Army who served as Chief of General Staff at the General Headquarters. Following retirement, he served as the Managing Director of the Fauji Foundation.

== Military career ==
Khan was commissioned into the Armoured Corps and rose through the ranks over a career spanning more than three decades. As a major general, he commanded an Infantry Division at Hyderabad.

In October 2008, his rank was elevated to lieutenant general and appointed as Chief of General Staff (CGS), a key appointment in the Pakistan Army.

In April 2010, he was appointed as corps commander of I Corps Mangla, the Pakistan Army’s premier offensive strike corps. He held the post until October 2010, when he retired from active military service.

In 2006, Khan was awarded with Hilal-i-Imtiaz for his performance in the Army.

== Post-retirement ==
Following his retirement, Khan was appointed as the Managing Director of the Fauji Foundation in 2010. He led one of Pakistan’s largest business and welfare conglomerates, which operates in numerous sectors. He served in this role until 2015.
