= Nauman Zakariya =

Pakistan military officer

Nauman Zakaria HI(M) SI(C) SBt
- نعمان زکریا

Commander I Corps
- In office May 2024 – October 2026
- Chief of Army Staff: Asim Munir
- Preceded by: Ayman Bilal
- Succeeded by: Shakir Ullah Khattak

Personal details
- Education: Pakistan Military Academy; Command and Staff College Quetta
- Awards: Hilal-e-Imtiaz; Sitara-e-Imtiaz; Sitara-e-Basalat

Military service
- Allegiance: Pakistan
- Branch/service: Pakistan Army
- Years of service: 1989 — present
- Rank: Lieutenant General
- Unit: 11th Cavalry
- Battles/wars: War in Afghanistan; Operation Zarb-e-Azb; Operation Radd-ul-Fasaad; 2019 India–Pakistan border skirmishes; 2020–21 India–Pakistan border skirmishes; Operation Azm-e-Istehkam; Durand Line skirmishes; Balochistan insurgency; 2025 India–Pakistan conflict; 2025 Afghanistan–Pakistan conflict; 2026 Afghanistan–Pakistan war

Lieutenant General Nauman Zakaria (Urdu: نعمان زکریا) is a Pakistani military officer who served as Commander I Corps since May 2024 to October 2026. He previously served as Chief of Logistics Staff (CLS) of Pakistan Army at the General Headquarters, Rawalpindi.

== Early life ==
Nauman Zakaria was born into a Punjabi family belonging to the Sandhu clan of Jats. He received his early education at Cadet College Hasanabdal.

== Military career ==
Zakaria was commissioned into the army in the 11th Cavalry via 80th PMA Long Course.

He served as the director-general of Military Operations (DG MO) and was also the general officer commanding (GOC) of the 9th Infantry Division in Kohat, along with Vice Chief of General Staff-Alpha (VCGS-A) during his career.

Under Zakaria's command, Pakistan Army successfully completed much of the fencing work on the Khyber-Pakhtunkhwa portion of Pakistan-Afghanistan border barrier till 2018.

Zakaria served as a DGMO during critical period like one in 2019 Indo-Pakistan skirmishes, when two nuclear-armed neighbors were on the cusp of war. DGMO Zakaria was instrumental in undertaking military diplomacy to strike consensus with his Indian counterpart DGMO Lt General Paramjit Singh Sangha to reiterate 2003 Indo-Pakistan ceasefire agreement on LOC in 2021. The agreement was pivotal in the restoration of peace and normalcy on the LOC separating disputed region of Kashmir that was long marred with cross-border violations alleged by both sides against others' military.

In 2020, Zakaria was conferred Hilal-i-Imtiaz by President Arif Alvi. He was later promoted to three star rank and appointed as Chief of Logistic staff. As per 2025, he is currently serving as the commander Central Command and commander of I Corps of Pakistan Army stationed at Mangla, Azad Kashmir since May 2024.

He commanded the striker I Corps during the 2025 India–Pakistan conflict, and was awarded Sitara-e-Basalat for his role in the conflict. He was conferred Sitara-i-Imtiaz as well.
