= Chaudhary Ikram ul Haq =

Pakistani general

Secretary of Defence
- In office 25 August 2018 – 25 August 2020
- Preceded by: Zamir ul Hassan Shah
- Succeeded by: Hilal Hussain

Corps Commander XXX Corps
- In office 2015–2017
- Preceded by: Ghayur Mahmood
- Succeeded by: Aamir Abbasi

Military service
- Allegiance: Pakistan
- Branch/service: Pakistan Army
- Years of service: 1981 — 2018
- Rank: Lieutenant General
- Unit: 39 Azad Kasmir Regiment
- Commands: Inspector General Training and Evaluation; Commander XXX Corps

Chaudhary Ikram ul Haq is a retired Pakistan Army lieutenant general who served as Secretary of Defence from August 2018 to August 2020. During his military career, he was Corps Commander XXX Corps and Inspector General Training and Evaluation.
