= Umar Farooq Durrani =

Chairman Pakistan Ordnance Factory
- In office April 2017 – February 2018
- Preceded by: Omar Mahmood Hayat
- Succeeded by: Sadiq Ali

Commander I Coprs Mangla
- In office September 2015 – April 2017
- Preceded by: Hilal Hussain
- Succeeded by: Azhar Saleh Abbasi

Personal details
- Education: Pakistan Military Academy; Command and Staff College Quetta; National Defence University; Joint Forces Staff College; Cranfield University; Royal Military College of Science
- Awards: Hilal-i-Imtiaz

Military service
- Allegiance: Pakistan
- Branch/service: Pakistan Army
- Years of service: 1983–2018
- Rank: Lieutenant General
- Unit: Armoured Corps
- Commands: General Officer Commanding 1st Armoured Division; Vice Chief of General Staff at GHQ; Commander I Corps Mangla; Chairman Pakistan Ordnance Factory

Umar Farooq Durrani is a retired senior officer of the Pakistan Army who served as commander of I Corps, Mangla, and chairman of Pakistan Ordnance Factories (POF), Wah Cantt.

== Early life and education ==
He is a graduate of the Command and Staff College, Quetta, and the National Defence University, Islamabad. He also attended courses at the Joint Forces Staff College in Norfolk, Virginia, USA, and Cranfield University, Royal Military College of Science, UK.

== Military career ==
Durrani was commissioned in the 19th Lancers.

As a captain, he served as aide-de-camp to the chief of army staff, General Aslam Beg. Durrani accompanied his regiment 19 Lancers to Somalia as part of UNOSOM II. He led his squadron in the rescue operation launched after the Black Hawk Down incident killing 18 US personnel. As a major general, he commanded 1st Armoured Division. Later he served as Vice Chief of General Staff, posted at GHQ. He was promoted from major general to the rank of lieutenant general in 2015.

Upon elevation of his rank, he was appointed as commander of I Corps, Mangla, a key strike formation of the Pakistan Army, in September 2015 and served until April 2017.

In April 2017, he was appointed as Chairman of Pakistan Ordnance Factories (POF), Wah Cantt, where he oversaw defense production and modernization efforts. As chairman of POF, he had led foreign delegations and worked with foreign companies to boost foreign diplomacy and mutual interest of works. He also worked to modernise the plants of POF, thereby boosting the working progress of it.

== Post-retirement activities ==
After retiring from the Pakistan Army in 2018, Durrani moved to Canada and became involved in developing business and trade initiatives between Canada and Pakistan. He serves as a board member of the Pakistan Western Canada Trade Association (PWCTA), promoting trade relations between Pakistan and Western Canada. He is also the incumbent Vice President of Focus College.Vice President, Global Engagement & Partnerships
