= Hilal Hussain =

32nd defence secretary of Pakistan

Lieutenant General Hilal Hussain HI(M)

32nd Defence Secretary
- In office 24 August 2020 – 24 August 2022
- Minister: Pervez Khattak; Khawaja Muhammad Asif
- Preceded by: Ikram Ul Haq
- Succeeded by: Hamood Uz Zaman
- Military career
- Education: National Defence University
- Allegiance: Pakistan
- Branch: Pakistan Army
- Rank: Lieutenant general
- Commands: Army Strategic Forces Command; I Corps
- Awards: Hilal-i-Imtiaz (M)
- Other work: president of Pakistan Golf Federation

Mian Muhammad Hilal Hussain is a retired lieutenant general of the Pakistan Army who served as the 32nd defence secretary of Pakistan from 2020 to 2022. Preceded by Lieutenant General Ikram Ul Haq, he was appointed to the post on 24 August 2020 by the government of Pakistan. Before retiring from the military service, his last assignment included commander of Army Strategic Forces Command.

== Military career ==
Hussain graduated from the Command and Staff College and the National Defence University, in addition to obtaining his education from Army Command and Staff College.

He was commissioned in the Pakistan Army with posting to 3 (SP) Medium Regiment Artillery in 1982. He served as a major while stationed at Siachen Glacier. During his career as lieutenant colonel, he commanded 44 (SP) Medium Regiment he was posted at the Line of Control (LoC), and brigade commander for operational areas with additional charges to command western border.

Prior to his appointment as commander of the Army Strategic Force Command in September 2015, he was appointed to I Corps as its commander succeeded by Umar Farooq Durrani in October 2015. His instructional assignments includes military advisor to Permanent Representative of Pakistan to the United Nations and military secretary to the president of Pakistan. Before commanding infantry brigade in the Federally Administered Tribal Area (FATA), he served as director general of Pakistan Rangers at Punjab and director general for Military Training at the General Headquarters.

=== Other works ===
In 2017, he was elected president of Pakistan Golf Federation for the term of four years which ended in 2020 before serving as defence secretary.
