= Special Support Group =

- Active: 2009
- Country: Pakistan
- Branch: Inter-Services
- Type: Unconventional
- Role: Military logistics
- Part of: Pakistan Armed Forces; Joint Strategic Forces Command
- Operational Command: Joint Staff Headquarters
- Engagements: War in North-West Pakistan; War in Afghanistan

Commanders
- Commanding Operational Structure: Joint Chiefs of Staff Committee
- Notable commanders: LGen Nadeem Ahmad; VAdm Hasham Siddique

Special Support Group (SSG) was an Inter-Services unit of Pakistan Armed Forces, activated in 2009, responsible for the relief and rehabilitation of Internally Displaced Persons (IDP) during War on Terror. The Special Support Group was an extended addition of special operations command of uniformed Inter-Services and the civilians, to provide support to executive difficult operations in civilian based areas, military logistics, security assistance, and administration.

It was given commissioned on 12 May 2009 to support internally displaced persons. Its first operational field commander was Lieutenant-General Nadeem Ahmad who played vital role in administratively leading the unit to execute the refugee operation in 2009.

== See also ==
- Pakistan Armed Forces
