= Operation Zalzala =

2008 Pakistani counterinsurgency operation

- Part of the Insurgency in Khyber Pakhtunkhwa
Date	24 January – 20 May 2008 (3 months, 3 weeks and 5 days)
Location	Spinkai, South Waziristan, Federally Administered Tribal Areas, Pakistan 33.55°N 70.41°E
Result	Pakistani victory

Belligerents
Pakistan	(Afghanistan) Tehrik-i-Taliban

Commanders and leaders
M.Gen. Tariq Khan; B.Gen. Ali Abbas	(Afghanistan) Baitullah Mehsud † (Afghanistan) Qari Hussain

Units involved
Pakistan Armed Forces; Pakistan Army; 14th Infantry Division; 9th Army Aviation Squadron; 20th Mountaineering Brigade	(Afghanistan) Pakistani Taliban

Strength
10,000–15,000 (estimated)	Unknown

Casualties and losses
6 soldiers dead	25–55 TTP fighters killed
- 150,000–200,000 people were displaced
- Location within Pakistan

The Operation Zalzala (English: Operation Earthquake), was a Pakistan Army military offensive, manhunt, and counter-insurgency operation that was commenced on 18 January 2008. The operation concluded with mixed results as the army had successfully captured the area, but had failed to capture or kill Qari Hussain, the main objective of the operation.

== Firefight ==
On 15 and 16 January 2008, large number of pro-Taliban militants had overrun Ludha, which resulted in Taliban victory as they had killed several paramilitary soldiers. On 24 January, the Pakistan Army started a full-fledged operation called 'Zalzala' (earthquake). The operation was led by Pakistan Army's 14th Infantry Division (normally stationed in Okara and assigned to II Corps) as it was supported by 20th Mountaineering Brigade. Major-General Tariq Khan, General Officer Commanding (GOC) of 14th Infantry Division served the Operation's Officer Commanding.

On 20 January 2008, the operation was launched. The army swept the area through with AH-1 Cobra helicopters, artillery and Al-Zarrar and Al-Khalid tanks that crunched across a parched riverbed.

== Aftermath ==
More than 200,000 people were displaced after the announcement of operation. During the operation, the army troops had discovered bomb factories and schools for teenage suicide bombers. Hate Literature and CDs were also confiscated by the army. The Army later on took part in the rebuilding process and helped facilitate the return of villagers to their respective homes.

The sporadic fighting continued in the area, and the troops were still fighting the Taliban forces. Following the operation, the Tehrik-i-Taliban Pakistan (TTP) offered a truce and peace negotiations resulting in a suspension of violence. In spite of the victory in the operation, on 21 May 2008 Pakistan signed a peace agreement with the Tehrik-i-Taliban Pakistan (TTP).

== See also ==
- Operation Sherdil
- Operation Black Thunderstorm
