= Ayman Bilal =

Pakistan military person

Ayman Bilal Safdar

Commander of I Corps
- In office September 2022 – May 2024
- Preceded by: Shaheen Mazhar Mehmood
- Succeeded by: Nauman Zakaria

Inspector General Frontier Corps Balochistan (South)
- In office December 2020 – October 2021
- Preceded by: Sarfaraz Ali
- Succeeded by: Kamal Anwar Chaudhry

Personal details
- Education: Pakistan Military Academy; Command and Staff College Quetta
- Awards: Hilal-i-Imtiaz

Military service
- Allegiance: Pakistan
- Branch/service: Pakistan Army
- Years of service: 1989–2024
- Rank: Lieutenant General
- Unit: 118 Medium Artillery Regiment
- Commands: General Officer Commanding 8 Infantry Division; Inspector General Frontier Corps Balochistan (South); Commander I Corps Mangla
- Battles/wars: Insurgency in Balochistan; MONUSCO

Ayman Bilal Safdar is a retired three-star general in the Pakistan Army, who last served as the commander of I Corps.

== Military career ==
Safdar was commissioned into the 118 Medium Artillery Regiment via 80th PMA Long Course.

Over his service of 35 years, he held several prominent roles. He served as the general officer commanding (GOC) of the 8th Infantry Division based in Sialkot, as well as chief instructor A Division at the National Defence University in Islamabad.

In December 2020, he was appointed as the inspector general of Frontier Corps Balochistan (South), a role he held until October 2021.

In September 2022, Safdar was promoted from major general to the rank of lieutenant general.

In 2022, he was appointed as corps commander of I Corps stationed in Mangla, one of Pakistan Army's key strike formations. He served at MONUSCO as foreign attachment.

== Retirement ==
In April 2024, his early retirement was accepted by the federal government amid reports suggesting internal reshuffling at the higher echelons of the Pakistan Army. But his retirement raised question as he criticised the army chief Asim Munir. Senior journalist Asad Ali Toor stated "His resignation is not a simple incident. It is not easily digestible. His thinking is seen to not have been in alignment with Munir’s and perhaps that is why he was sidelined and had to resign."

== Controversy ==
In 2021, in an interview with Bangladeshi newspaper Daily Sun, Ayman Bilal said "China deployed me here to crush the Baloch movement. I have been given six months to do so." In that interview Bill also commented that Iran is the biggest enemy of Pakistan now.
