= Ijlal Haider Zaidi =

Pakistani politician

Syed Ijlal Haider Zaidi (29 December 1929 – 23 March 2013)) was a member of the Civil Service of Pakistan (CSP). He served in various key administrative and secretarial capacities, including Deputy Commissioner of Peshawar, Director General of Radio Pakistan, Chief Secretary of Azad Kashmir, Chief Secretary of North-West Frontier Province, Federal Defence Secretary.

After his retirement, Zaidi served as an advisor to the Prime Minister of Pakistan Benazir Bhutto. Since 1992 he has been the chairman of the Pakistan-Japan Friendship Association, and in 2008 received a special commendation for his work there from the Japanese ambassador to Pakistan.

== Early life and career ==
Syed Ijlal Haider Zaidi was born on 29 December 1929 in Shahabad, the then Karnal district, British India. He was a B.Sc engineer by profession, and obtained distinguished position in Superior Competitive Services examinations of Pakistan. His grandfather late Engineer Mr. Syed Ghulam Shabbir Zaidi (1860—26 November 1949) was the chief of Shahabad town and renowned philanthropist of the town, and his father late Mr. Syed Muhammad Ibrahim Zaidi (December 1890—11 September 1958) was one of the pioneer Muslim B.Sc engineers of the entire Indian sub-continent, and Aligarh College graduate as well as a poet, novelist, intellectual and prose-writer; and also served as Senior Vice Chairman of Lahore Board of Education during the 1950s. His youngest brother late Mr. Syed Ijmal Haider Zaidi (12 October 1949—29 March 2009), who served as senior Vice President, Habib Bank Limited, Pakistan, was also a lawyer and writer, whose son Mujtaba Haider Zaidi writer, lawyer and columnist of Pakistani English Newspaper The Frontier Post is the pioneer playwright of the Theatre of the Absurd and Stream of Consciousness in Urdu literature and author of first book in support of disputed Power to Veto under the title "Veto Oligarchy: The Fittest Deserve Supremacy".

== Death and legacy ==
Syed Ijlal Haider Zaidi died on the morning of 23 March 2013 in Lahore after a 2-year battle with cancer. He left behind three daughters. Zaidi was an influential member of the establishment. He served as a senior bureaucrat while working very close to four former Presidents of Pakistan including Zulfiqar Ali Bhutto, General Zia Ul-Haq, Ghulam Ishaq Khan and Farooq Leghari, and was considered to be the right hand man and the closest aide of the former President Ghulam Ishaq Khan.
