= Abbottabad Commission Report =

Investigation results surrounding the killing of Osama bin Laden by US forces

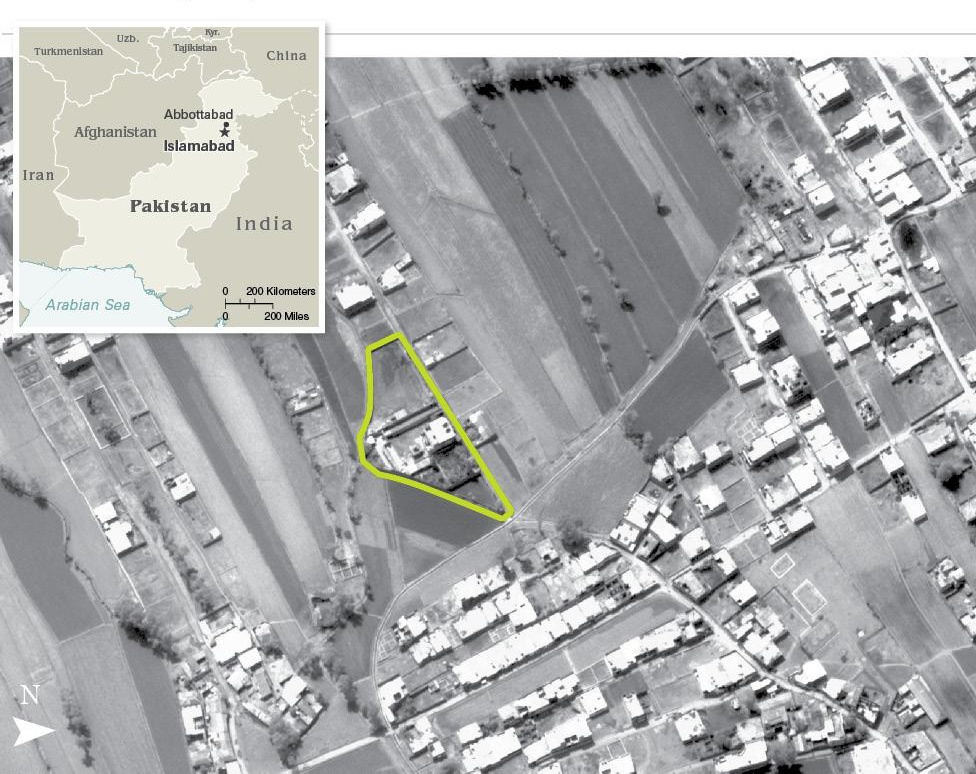
The classified papers analysed the unilateral military actions of US military forces in Pakistan that occurred in 2011.

The Abbottabad Commission Report is a judicial inquiry paper authored and submitted by the Abbottabad Commission, led by Justice Javaid Iqbal, to the prime minister of Pakistan on 4 January 2013. The report investigates the circumstances surrounding the death of Osama bin Laden in Abbottabad. Upon submission, the report was immediately classified by the Prime Minister and its findings were not made public.

Indicated by the media, the report compiled the 700 pages, which lists some 200 recommendations after interviewing over 300 witnesses and scrutinizing more than 3,000 documents pertaining to the raid by US special operations forces to kill al-Qaeda leader Osama bin Laden on May 2, 2011. In response to American unilateral actions, the government formed the commission which was to find out exactly what happened and who was responsible for failing to catch the high-profile target, who had taken refuge in Abbottabad. In 2013, parts of the reports were published by the news channels in the country and most of the findings of said report were leaked to the press and were strongly criticized by defense experts. The government then classified all of its publications despite American reservations and concerns, but the report was released by Al Jazeera on 8 July 2013.

== Background ==
In 2011, the United States took unilateral actions to target and kill al-Qaeda leader Osama bin Laden, who was reportedly in hiding in Abbottabad, in the Khyber Pakhtunkhwa Province of Pakistan. After much criticism, Prime Minister Yousaf Raza Gillani formed a commission under Senior Justice Javed Iqbal to investigate the incident and how bin Laden was able to avoid detection in Pakistan for a prolonged period of time. Soon after conducting session interviews, Senior Justice Iqbal announced that Abbottabad Commission report would be made public in a few weeks. Despite Iqbal's claims, the commission did not release the report and its preparation period was further prolonged.

In 2012, the Pakistani Ministry of Justice (MoJ) issued a notification to the commission on asking to complete its investigation and submit the report on 12 October 2012.

Parts of the report recommended a trial against the medical doctor-turned spy, Dr. Shakil Afridi. Asked by a journalist for delaying of the report, Senior Justice Iqbal maintained that the presence of Central Intelligence Agency (CIA) operatives in Pakistan is also being investigated, adding that it would be mentioned in the report. To another question by a journalist as to whether the person killed in the compound in Abbottabad was Osama bin Laden, Justice Javed Iqbal quoted: "If we tell you that what's left.... You'll find out soon."

== Contents ==
According to The Daily Telegraph, the papers ultimately cleared the Government of Pakistan, armed forces, the establishment, and intelligence services of involvement in protection of the al-Qaeda chief. American political critics have accused Pakistan officials of knowing more about Bin Laden's presence than they were letting on. The United States had long maintained that it is important for the Pakistani and American public to see the report of Abbottabad Commission. All requests had been dismissed by the Government of Pakistan.

=== Classified status ===
Before the full submission of the papers in 2013, only a few parts of the papers were obtained by the World News channel of Pakistan and televised all over the nation in 2012. Following the broadcast, the US State Department declined to comment on the report.

In an official press briefing to media, the US State Department maintained that the "U.S. shares with Pakistan a "profound" interest in learning about what kind of support network al-Qaeda chief Osama bin Laden might have had during his hiding but would only comment on the Abbottabad Commission's findings on the issue when it gets the actual report." The defence authors had had earlier hinted to media that the papers would be marked as classified and to expect little of substance to be revealed. Excerpts leaked to the press from the yet-to-be-made-public report differed with the American account of the incident.

In January 2013, the final report was submitted to Prime Minister Pervez Ashraf to review the papers. After briefly reviewing the papers, Prime Minister Ashraf classified the publications of the report before leaving the office.

=== Al Jazeera report leak ===
The report of the Abbottabad Commission, formed in June 2011 to probe the circumstances around the killing of Osama bin Laden by American forces in a unilateral raid on the Pakistani city of Abbottabad, was leaked by the Al Jazeera Investigative Unit on 8 July 2013, after being suppressed by the Pakistani government. The report drew on testimony from more than 200 witnesses, including members of Bin Laden's family, Pakistan's then spy chief Ahmad Shuja Pasha, senior ministers in the government and officials at every level of the military, bureaucracy and security services. The four-member Abbottabad Commission interviewed 201 people, including the country's intelligence leaders, in an effort to piece together the events around the American raid on 2 May 2011, that killed Bin Laden, the leader of Al Qaeda, and embarrassed the Pakistani government. The commission was led by Justice Javed Iqbal of the Pakistani Supreme Court, a retired police officer, a diplomat and an army general. It first met in July 2011, two months after the American raid, and has held 52 hearings and conducted seven field visits.

Osama bin Laden was able to hide in Pakistan for nine years due to the "collective failure" of state military and intelligence authorities and "routine" incompetence at every level of civil governance structure, allowing Bin Laden to move to six different locations within the country. Al Jazeera described the commission's 336-page report as 'scathing', holding both the government and the military responsible for "gross incompetence" leading to "collective failures" that allowed both Bin Laden to escape detection, and the United States to perpetrate "an act of war". It found that Pakistan's intelligence establishment had "closed the book" on Bin Laden by 2005, and was no longer actively pursuing intelligence that could lead to his capture. The Abbottabad Commission report criticized the Pakistani government and military for a "national disaster" over its handling of Bin Laden and called on the leadership to apologize to the people of Pakistan for their "dereliction of duty."

The document repeatedly returned to what it describes as "government implosion syndrome" to explain the failure of any institution to investigate Bin Laden's unusual hideout. "It is a glaring testimony to the collective incompetence and negligence, at the very least, of the security and intelligence community in the Abbottabad area," said the report. "How the entire neighborhood, local officials, police and security and intelligence officials all missed the size, the strange shape, the barbed wire, the lack of cars and visitors ... over a period of nearly six years beggars belief," it said. The report said that Bin Laden must have required a support network "that could not possibly have been confined to the two Pashtun brothers who worked as his couriers, security guards and general factotums". The report said: "Over a period of time an effective intelligence agency should have been able to contact, infiltrate or co-opt them and to develop a whole caseload of information. Apparently, this was not the case." The commission didn't rule out the possibility of involvement by rogue Pakistani intelligence officers, who have been accused of deliberately shielding Bin Laden by some commentators. "Given the length of stay and the changes of residence of [Bin Laden] and his family in Pakistan ... the possibility of some such direct or indirect and "plausibly deniable" support cannot be ruled out, at least, at some level outside formal structures of the intelligence establishment." "Connivance, collaboration and cooperation at some levels cannot be entirely discounted," it said.

The commission made several findings. Among these include:

- Osama bin Laden entered Pakistan in mid-2002 after narrowly escaping capture in the battle of Tora Bora in Afghanistan. Over nine years, he moved to various places inside the country, including South Waziristan and northern Swat Valley.
- In Swat, the al-Qaeda leader reportedly met with Khalid Sheikh Mohammad, the alleged mastermind of the 9/11 attacks, in early 2003. About a month later, the latter was captured in Rawalpindi in a joint US-Pakistani operation, and bin Laden fled the area.
- Osama bin Laden, along with two of his wives and several children and grandchildren, moved into the custom-built compound in Abbottabad, a military garrison town, in 2005 and lived there until the US raid.
- Osama bin Laden was very concerned about surveillance. The report says bin Laden wore a cowboy hat outside to avoid detection from above and considered buying and cutting down a row of poplar trees on the perimeter of the Abbottabad compound because he thought it might provide cover for observers.
- The presence of a CIA support network to help track down bin Laden without the Pakistani establishment's knowledge was "a case of nothing less than a collective and sustained dereliction of duty by the political, military and intelligence leadership of the country."

With respect to the death of bin Laden at the hands of US Navy SEALs, the report concluded:

The whole episode of the U.S. assassination mission of May 2, 2011 and the Pakistan government's response before, during and after appears in large part to be a story of complacency, ignorance, negligence, incompetence, irresponsibility and possibly worse at various levels inside and outside the government.

The Pakistani military's inability to prevent an American incursion into its airspace was described as the country's greatest "humiliation" since 1971, when Indian forces routed Pakistan in a war that led to the creation of the present-day state of Bangladesh, according to the report. Despite American assurances that US forces would enter Pakistan if they thought they could capture Osama bin Laden, Pakistani air defenses were set to a "peace time mode" when American helicopters crossed into Pakistani airspace, the report stated. The report didn't name the persons responsible for the failures in the hunt for bin Laden as well as the American intrusion into Pakistan and said that it may be politically unrealistic to suggest punishments for them, but "as honorable men, they ought to do the honorable thing, including submitting a formal apology to the nation for their dereliction of duty."
