= Tariq Khan (general) =

Pakistani general

Lieutenant-General Tariq Khan HI(M)
- طارق خان

Commander I Corps, Mangla
- In office 2010–2014

Inspector General, Frontier Corps
- In office 2008–2010

Personal details
- Born: Tank, Khyber Pakhtunkhwa
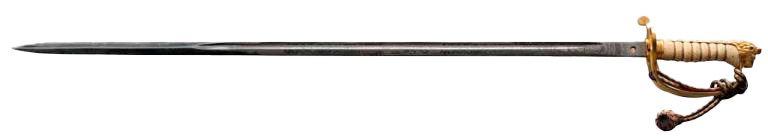
- Awards: Hilal-e-Imtiaz (Military); Kuwait Liberation Medal; Legion of Merit Sword of Honour

Military service
- Allegiance: Pakistan
- Branch/service: Pakistan Army
- Years of service: 1977 – 2014
- Rank: Lieutenant-General
- Unit: Armoured Corps
- Commands: 1st Armoured Division, Multan; 14th Infantry Division, D.I. Khan; Frontier Corps (KP); I Corps, Mangla
- Battles/wars: Gulf War; War in North-West Pakistan; Operation Zalzala; Operation Sherdil; Operation Rah-e-Nijat

Tariq Khan HI(M) is a retired Pakistan Army general officer who was the Commander of I Strike Corps at Mangla.

A war hero, he has been the Inspector General of the Frontier Corps from September 2008 till October 2010. He has also commanded the 1st Armoured Division in Multan from 2006 to 2007 and then the 14th Infantry Division in South Waziristan till 2008. Khan gained fame when he led the Frontier Corps to victory against Tehrik-e-Taliban Pakistan in the Battle of Bajaur in 2009.

Additionally, he was the Chief Executive and Managing Director of Fauji Fertilizer Company Limited (FFC), FFC Energy Limited, and Fauji Fresh n Freeze Limited. He also holds directorships on the boards of several companies in Pakistan.

== Early life and education ==
Hailing from Tank in Khyber Pakhtunkhwa, Khan is a graduate of the Command and Staff College Quetta and the National Defence University Islamabad. He holds a master’s degree in War Studies.

== Military career ==
He was commissioned in the Armoured Corps in the 55th PMA Long Course on 16 April 1977 and was awarded the Sword of Honour from the Pakistan Military Academy. He has participated in the First Gulf War of 1991, and contributed towards the international effort in the war on terrorism as Pakistan's Senior National Representative at CENTCOM, Tampa, Florida from 2004 to 2005.

Khan was then promoted to major general in 2006 and commanded an armoured division in Multan and later an infantry division in South Waziristan leading Operation Zalzala against the militants. After commanding an infantry division, Maj Gen Tariq was posted as IG FC KPK, where he changed FC from a ragtag group of fighters into a force on par with Pakistan Army. As IG FC, he commanded the spearhead of Pakistan's war against terror. On 1 October 2010 he was promoted to the rank of Lieutenant General and appointed Corps Commander Mangla and Commander Central Command.

== Post-retirement ==
=== Academic career ===
Tariq Khan was on the faculty of Command and Staff College Quetta and National Defence University Islamabad. Following his retirement, he has continued his association with National Defence University as a senior mentor and is on the honorary faculty of reputed institutions.

=== Corporate career ===
Following his retirement from the Pakistan Army, Tariq Khan transitioned to the corporate sector. He is Chief Executive and Managing Director of Fauji Fertilizer Company Limited (FFC), FFC Energy Limited, and Fauji Fresh n Freeze Limited. In addition to these roles, he holds directorships on the boards of Fauji Fertilizer Bin Qasim Limited, Askari Bank Limited, Fauji Foods Limited, Philip Morris (Pakistan) Limited, Fauji Meat Limited, FFBL Foods Limited, FFBL Power Company Limited, Thar Energy Limited, and Pakistan Maroc Phosphore S.A.

== Honors ==
Tariq Khan has been successful in turning the Frontier Corps around from a force in great difficulty into a highly professional one which has seen great successes in its recent operations against the militants in Federally Administered Tribal Areas and Khyber Pakhtunkhwa, Pakistan. On 9 December 2007, Tariq Khan received United States Legion of Merit for meritorious services as a liaison officer at CENTCOM during Operation Enduring Freedom.

== Writings ==
Tariq Khan has contributed to articles in Defence Journal.

== Awards and decorations ==

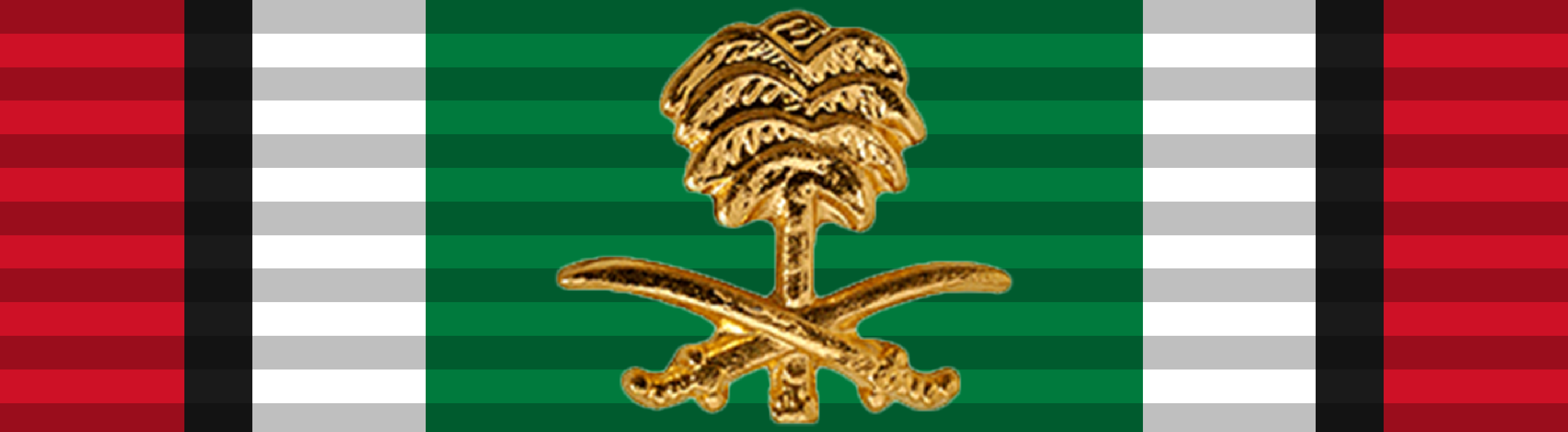

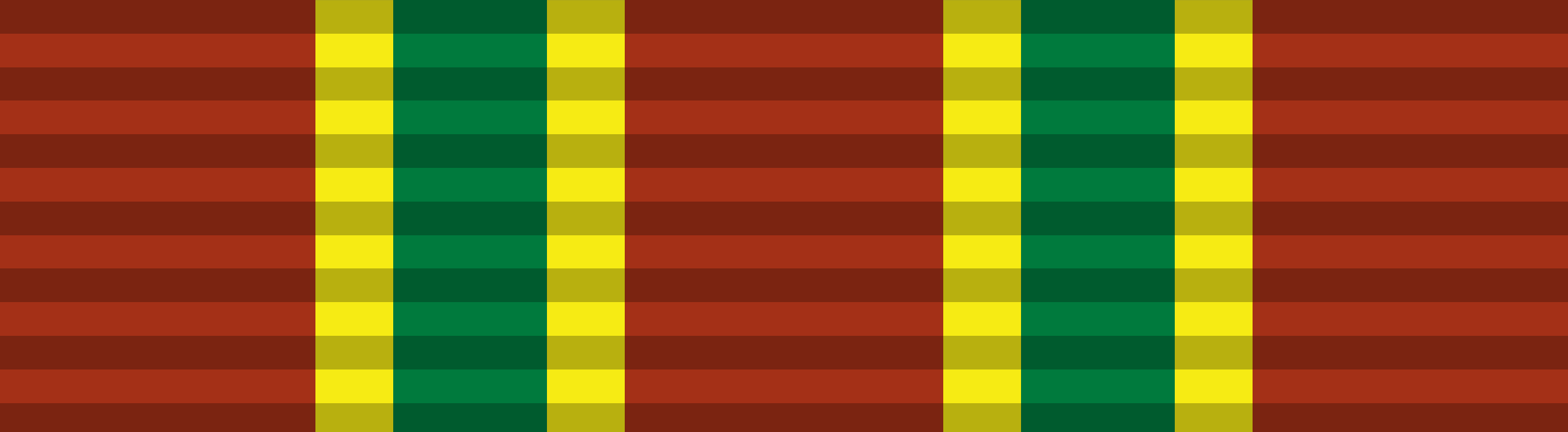

Hilal-e-Imtiaz (Military) (Crescent of Excellence) 2013	Tamgha-e-Baqa (Nuclear Test Medal) 1998	Tamgha-e-Istaqlal Pakistan (Escalation with India Medal) 2002	10 Years Service Medal
20 Years Service Medal	30 Years Service Medal	35 Years Service Medal	Tamgha-e-Sad Saala Jashan-e- Wiladat-e-Quaid-e-Azam (100th Birth Anniversary of Muhammad Ali Jinnah) 1976
Hijri Tamgha (Hijri Medal) 1979	Jamhuriat Tamgha (Democracy Medal) 1988	Qarardad-e-Pakistan Tamgha (Resolution Day Golden Jubilee Medal) 1990	Tamgha-e-Salgirah Pakistan (Independence Day Golden Jubilee Medal) 1997
Command & Staff College Quetta Instructor's Medal	Kuwait Liberation Medal (Saudi Arabia) (Gulf War 1991)	Nuth al-Markat (Combat Medal) Saudi Arabia (Gulf War 1991)	The Legion of Merit (Degree of Officer) (United States) 2007

=== Foreign decorations ===
Foreign Awards
Saudi Arabia	Kuwait Liberation Medal (Saudi Arabia) (Gulf War 1991)
Saudi Arabia	Nuth al-Markat (Combat Medal) (Gulf War 1991)
USA	The Legion of Merit (Degree of Officer)
