= Mangla Cantonment =

Army garrison in Punjab, Pakistan

Mangla Cantonment is an army garrison near Mangla Dam in Jhelum District of Punjab, Pakistan. The town of Mangla and Mangla dam are located across the Jhelum river in Pakistan administered Kashmir. The cantonment has an area of 1.2 km^{2} with a population of 19,129 in 2023.

Sherni, an Indian tank captured by Pakistan Army during the war in 1971, is on display in Mangla Cantonment.

== History ==
During the construction of Mangla Dam, the area belonging to the villages of Baral, Baruti, Thill and Sultanpur was evacuated to build residential colonies and offices. After the departure of foreign contractors and their families in late 1969, the area changed hands from WAPDA to the army and was finally made a cantonment known as "Mangla Cantonment." Mangla Cantonment is located approximately 10 km from Mirpur, 70km from Rawalpindi and 180km from Lahore.

Mangla produces about 1000MW of electricity for the Pakistan power sector. Furthermore, their canal system provides water for crops around the region. Mangla Dam holds vital significance in meeting Pakistan's water needs.

Before becoming Chief of Army Staff of the Pakistan Army, General Pervez Musharraf was the Corps Commander of Mangla Cantonment.

The Mangla Cantonment provides many facilities to its inhabitants such as exclusive swimming pools, libraries, cafes and parks. Many people from nearby villages come to this cantonment to study in the college here.

== Healthcare ==
- Combined Military Hospital, Mangla
- Cantt Public Infirmary
