= Muhammad Aamer =

Pakistani retired army officer

Ambassador of Pakistan to Qatar
- Incumbent
- Assumed office 27 January 2025
- Preceded by: Muhemmed Aejaz

Personal details
- Born: June 25, 1968 (age 57)
- Awards: Hilal-i-Imtiaz (Military)

Military service
- Allegiance: Pakistan
- Branch/service: Pakistan Army
- Rank: Lieutenant general

Muhammad Aamer (born 25 June 1968) is a Pakistani retired military officer who is serving as the Ambassador of Pakistan to Qatar. He was commissioned in an artillery regiment in 1987, was promoted to the rank of lieutenant general in 2019, and later served as commander of XXX Corps at Gujranwala. He was a aide-de-camp to Asif Ali Zardari during his first tenure as president.

== Military career ==
Aamer was commissioned in an artillery regiment in 1987. He is a graduate of the Command and Staff College, Quetta, and the National Defence University, Islamabad, and holds master's degrees in arts and science of warfare and strategic studies.

His other appointments included service as platoon commander at the Pakistan Military Academy, and as directing staff at the Command and Staff College, Quetta, and the National Defence University. On the operational side, he served as brigade major of an infantry brigade on the Line of Control and as General Staff Officer-I (Plans) of a deployed corps. He also served as a United Nations military observer in Sierra Leone and as military secretary to the president of Pakistan.

In September 2019, he was promoted from major general to lieutenant general. In October 2021, he assumed command of Gujranwala Corps. He also served as an infantry division commander and as Director General Global Affairs at General Headquarters.

== Diplomatic career ==
In December 2024, Aamer was redesignated as Pakistan's ambassador to Qatar after initially having been nominated as ambassador to the United Arab Emirates. He replaced Mohammad Ejaz, who had been reassigned as ambassador to Belarus. On 27 January 2025, he presented his credentials to Tamim bin Hamad Al Thani, the Emir of Qatar.

Aamer attended the first session of 2025–2026 Iran–United States negotiations in Muscat and coordinated Pakistan's role as a mediator between the U.S. and Iran.
