= Tariq Waseem Ghazi =

Pakistani Army general

Lieutenant general Tariq Waseem Ghazi HI(M)
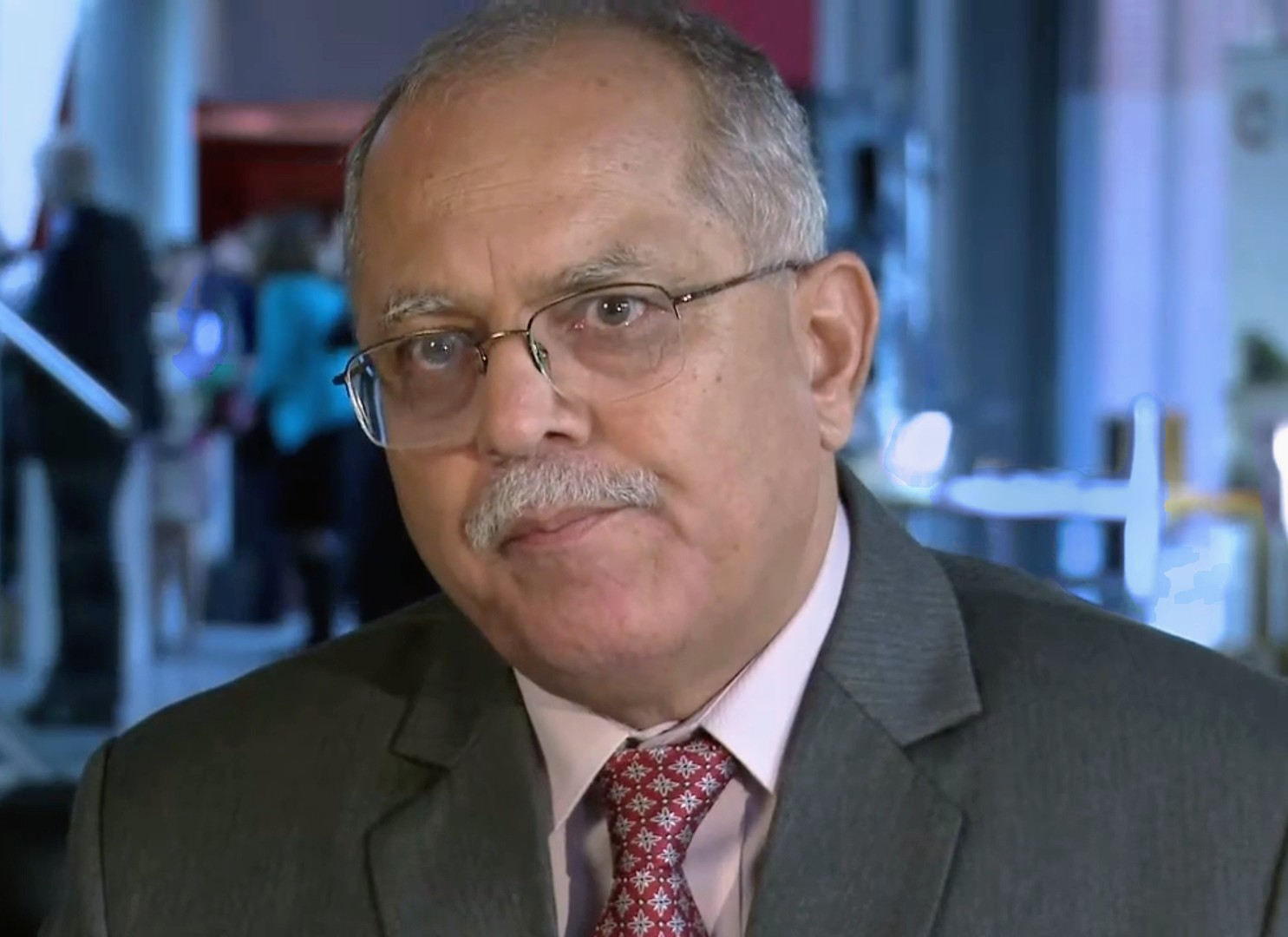

23rd Defence Secretary
- In office May 2005 – April 2007
- President: Pervez Musharraf

21st President of the National Defence University
- In office 3 January 2004 – 16 October 2004

Personal details
- Education: MS
- Alma mater: Quaid-i-Azam University, formerly called University of Islamabad, Pakistan
- Awards: Hilal-e-Imtiaz (Military)

Military service
- Allegiance: Pakistan
- Branch/service: Pakistan Army
- Years of service: 1967–2005
- Rank: Lieutenant general
- Unit: Baloch Regiment

Tariq Waseem Ghazi HI(M) is a retired lieutenant general in the Pakistan Army who served as the 23rd secretary of defense to the government of Pakistan, 21st president of the National Defence University, Pakistan and commandant of the Pakistan Command and Staff College, Quetta, Pakistan.

== Early life and education ==
Tariq Waseem Ghazi was born into a military family and he, himself, had a military career of 38 years. He earned a master's degree in 'War Studies' from the University of Islamabad, now called Quaid-i-Azam University, Pakistan.

== Career ==
Ghazi was commissioned in the Baloch Regiment in 1967. He obtained MS degree in war studies from the University of Islamabad, now called Quaid-i-Azam University in Pakistan.

He also trained with the Australian and Canadian militaries.

After retiring from the military, he was appointed as defense secretary in the ministry of Defence from May 2005 to April 2007.

Prior to his appointment at the ministry of defence, Ghazi served as a military observer for the United Nations Observer Mission in Georgia in 1998.

== Awards and decorations ==

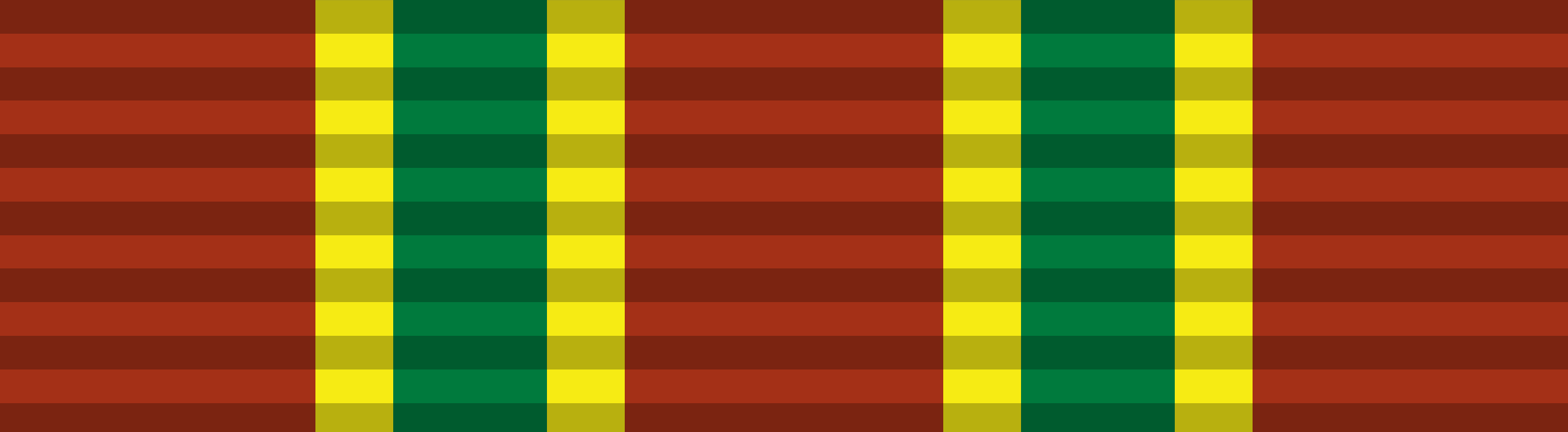

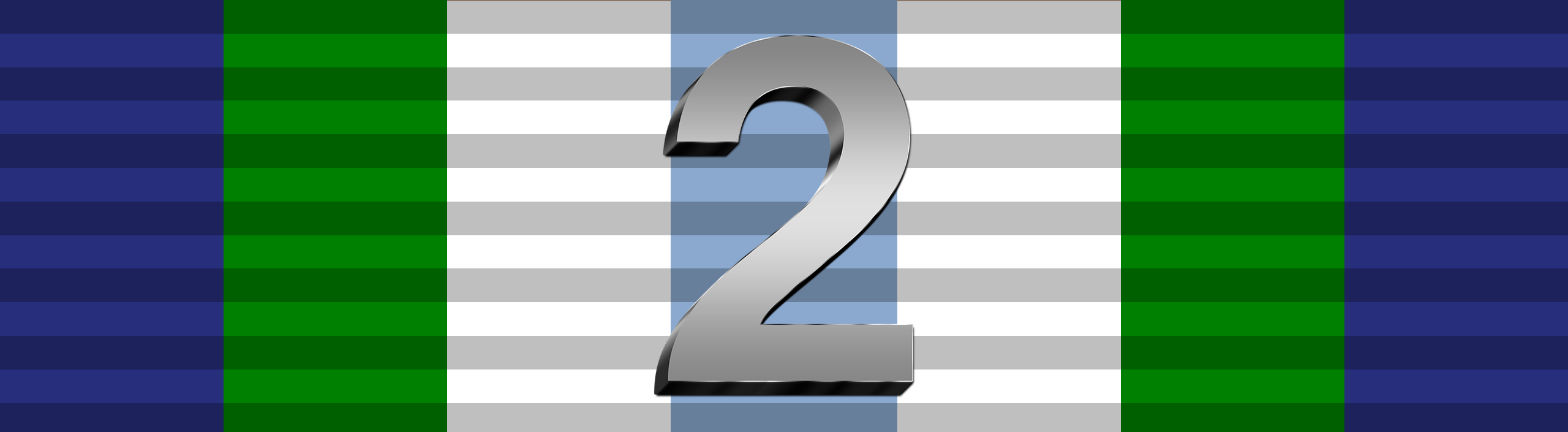

Hilal-e-Imtiaz (Military) (Crescent of Excellence)|	Tamgha-e-Jang 1971 War (War Medal 1971)	Tamgha-e-Baqa (Nuclear Test Medal) 1998	
Tamgha-e-Istaqlal Pakistan (Escalation with India Medal) 2002	10 Years Service Medal	20 Years Service Medal	30 Years Service Medal
35 Years Service Medal	Tamgha-e-Sad Saala Jashan-e- Wiladat-e-Quaid-e-Azam (100th Birth Anniversary of Muhammad Ali Jinnah) 1976	Hijri Tamgha (Hijri Medal) 1979	Jamhuriat Tamgha (Democracy Medal) 1988
Qarardad-e-Pakistan Tamgha (Resolution Day Golden Jubilee Medal) 1990	Tamgha-e-Salgirah Pakistan (Independence Day Golden Jubilee Medal) 1997	Nuth al-Markat (Combat Medal) Saudi Arabia (Gulf War 1991)	United Nations UNOMIG Medal (2 Deployments)

=== Foreign decorations ===
Foreign Awards
Saudi Arabia	Nuth al-Markat (Combat Medal) (Gulf War 1991)
United Nations	UNOMIG Medal
