= Defence Secretary (Pakistan) =

Administrative post of the ministry of defence

Defence Secretary of Pakistan
- Incumbent; Lt Gen (R) Muhammad Ali
- Reports to: Defence Minister of Pakistan
- Appointer: Prime Minister of Pakistan
- Website: defence.gov.pk

The Defence Secretary of Pakistan is the Federal Secretary for the Ministry of Defence of Pakistan.

== List of Defence Secretaries ==
Name	Office Assumed	Left Office
Maj Gen(R) Iskander Mirza	October 1947	May 1954
Akhter Husain	June 1954	August 1957
Muhammad Khurshid	March 1958	June 1959
S Fida Hussain	July 1958	August 1961
Nazir Ahmed	August 1961	September 1965
S Fida Hussain	September 1965	June 1966
S I Haque	June 1966	December 1966
S. Ghias Uddin Ahmed	December 1966	August 1973
Maj Gen (R) Fazal Muqeem Khan	August 1973	October 1977
Ghulam Ishaq Khan (Secretary General)	October 1975	July 1977
Lt Gen Ghulam Jilani Khan (Secretary General)	October 1977	April 1980
Rasheed Ud Din Arshad	May 1980	September 1980
Maj Gen (R) M. Rahim Khan	November 1980	December 1985
Asif Rahim	June 1981	June 1984
Aftab Ahmad Khan	February 1984	August 1985
Ijlal Haider Zaidi	August 1985	November 1989
Salim Abbas Jilani	November 1989	November 1996
Hasan Raza Pasha	November 1996	feb 1997
Lt Gen (R) Lehrasab Khan	March 1997	March 2001
Lt Gen (R) Hamid Nawaz Khan	March 2001	May 2005
Lt Gen (R) Tariq Waseem Ghazi	May 2005	April 2007
Kamran Rasool	April 2007	November 2008
Lt Gen (R) Syed Athar Ali	November 2008	November 2011
Lt Gen (R) Naeem Khalid Lodhi	November 2011	January 2012
Nargis Sethi	January 2012	July 2012
Lt Gen (R) Asif Yaseen Malik	July 2012	August 2014
Lt Gen (R) Alam Khattak	August 2014	August 2016
Maj Gen Muhammad Abid Nazir (Acting)	August 2016	August 2016
Lt Gen (R) Zamir ul Hassan Shah	26 August 2016	24 August 2018
Lt Gen (R) Ikram ul Haq	25 August 2018	25 August 2020
Lt Gen (R) Mian Hilal Hussain	25 August 2020	August 2022
Lt Gen (R) Hamood Uz Zaman	August 2022	23 August 2024
Maj Gen Amer Ashfaq Kayani	23 August 2024	30 September 2024
Lt Gen (R) Muhammad Ali	1 October 2024	incumbent

== See also ==
- Cabinet Secretary of Pakistan
- Establishment Secretary of Pakistan
- Foreign Secretary of Pakistan
- Finance Secretary of Pakistan
- Interior Secretary of Pakistan
