= Abbottabad Commission =

The Abbottabad Commission was a judicial inquiry commissioned to provide reports on the circumstantial events leading up to the United States decision to take unilateral military actions in Abbottabad in Khyber-Pakhtunkhwa Province of Pakistan, with the objective of neutralizing al-Qaeda leader Osama bin Laden on May 2, 2011. Constituted by the Supreme Court of Pakistan on the request of the Government of Pakistan on 21 June 2011, the commission was chaired by the Senior Justice Javaid Iqbal and other members selected by the Supreme Court.

The Commission critically evaluated and provided analysis to "ascertain full facts regarding the presence of Osama bin Laden in Pakistan" and thoroughly "investigated circumstances and facts regarding the American operation in Abbottabad on 2 May 2011." The commission extensively interviewed local residents of Abbottabad, government ministers, military officials, and investigative espionage journalists.

The commission's final report included 300 witnesses and reviewed 3,000 official documents over two years. The final report was based on public testimonies and was prepared by the Senior Justice Javid Iqbal. The reports were submitted to Prime Minister Pervez Ashraf in January 2013 and were marked as "classified" by the government. No details were made public despite the requests of officials. By early 2012, only a few portions were released to the media. The Abbottabad Commission Report was released by Al Jazeera on 8 July 2013.

== Overview of Abbottabad Commission ==
=== Members and priorities of the Commissions ===
The commission was headed by Justice Javaid Iqbal and included Senator Ashraf Kazi, Lieutenant-General (retired) Nadeem Ahmad, civil servant Nargis Sethi and former Inspector-General of Frontier Police, Abbas Khan.

After much criticism, Prime Minister Yousaf Raza Gillani formed the commission under Senior Justice Javed Iqbal and its members included:

- Senior Justice Javed Iqbal— Chairman
  - Senior Justice Fakhruddin Ebrahim‡ resigned due to poor health
  - Lieutenant-General Nadeem Ahmad— Military Intelligence investigative member
  - Inspector-General Abbas Khan— Internal security member
  - Senator Ashraf Jahangir Qazi— Political science and foreign affairs member
  - Senior Justice Rana Bhagwandas†— Legal and philosophical affairs member. Joined the commission after Ebrahim resigning

The terms of reference of the commission were

  - to ascertain full facts regarding the presence of Osama bin Laden in Pakistan;
  - investigate circumstances and facts regarding the US operation in Abbottabad on 2 May 2011;
  - determine the nature, background, and causes of lapses of authorities concerned, if any;
  - make consequential recommendations.

=== Political response ===
The main conservative party in the country, the Pakistan Muslim League (N) (PML-N), criticized Prime Minister Gillani for a failure to initiate a probe into the May US incursion in accordance with the resolution adopted during the joint secret session of parliament. Despite Prime Minister Gillani addressing his concerns to PML-N, the party pushed for an independent commission to be formed. The PML-N persuasion was that "it did not want the armed forces to face another fiasco like the 1971 war or the Kargil misadventure".

After meeting with the Lieutenant-General Shuja' Pasha of the ISI, Justice minister Bux Chandio hinted that the commission would be formed after the consultation. In June 2011, Prime Minister Gillani announced the intent to form the commission under Supreme Court's Senior Justice Javed Iqbal.

=== Interview and studies ===
The Commission extensively interviewed 300 people. Among the notable people summoned and testified to the commission were:

  - Hina Khar— Foreign minister at that time
  - Ahmad Mukhtar— Defense minister during this period.
  - Ziauddin Butt— former director-general of the ISI (in 1999).
  - Lieutenant-General Nadeem Taj— director-general of Military Intelligence (MI)
  - Ijaz Shah.— former director-general of Intelligence Bureau (IB), working under former President Pervez Musharraf from 2004 to 2007

The 700-page report was prepared after the commission interviewed 300 witnesses and reviewed 3000 documents. The commission submitted its report to prime minister Raja Pervaiz Ashraf in January 2013.

== See also ==
- Death of Osama bin Laden
- Shakil Afridi
- Zero Dark Thirty
