= XXX Corps (Pakistan) =

Pakistan Army's field maneuver strike corps

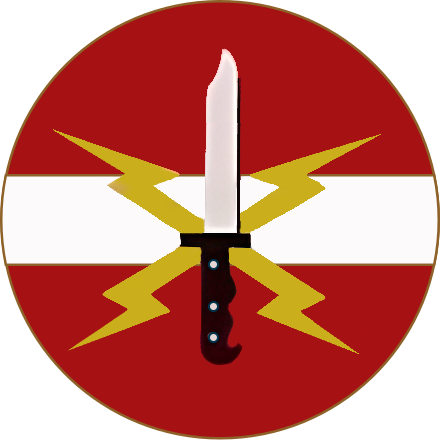
- Formation Sign of XXX Corps, Gujranwala
- Active: 1986; 40 years ago
- Country: Pakistan
- Branch: Pakistan Army
- Type: X XX Corps
- Role: Maneuver/Deployment oversight.
- Size: ~45,000 approximately (Though this may vary as units are rotated)
- Garrison/HQ: Gujranwala Cantonment, Punjab, Pakistan
- Nickname: 30th Corps
- Colors Identification: Red, white and green
- Anniversaries: 1986
- Engagements: India-Pakistan Standoff in 2001–02
- Decorations: Military Decorations of Pakistan Military

Commanders
- Commander: Lt-Gen. Syed Tahir Hameed Shah
- Notable commanders: FM.Asim Munir; Gen. Raheel Sharif; Gen. Ziauddin Butt; Lt-Gen. Javed Ashraf; Lt-Gen.A. Q. Baloch; Lt-Gen.Nadeem Taj

Insignia
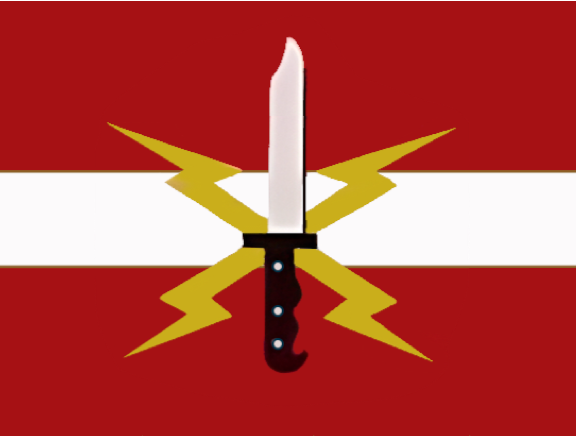
- Flag

The XXX Corps is a field corps of the Pakistan Army, currently stationed in Gujranwala, Punjab.

Formed in 1986 with its headquarters initially in Sialkot, it was later shifted to Gujranwala Cantonment. The XXX Corps is one of Pakistan's ten field corps and it is currently commanded by Lt-Gen. Syed Tahir Hameed Shah.

== Overview ==
=== Formation and war service ===
In 1985, the Army GHQ formed three field corps to improve the internal security in Balochistan and Punjab. Originally, the XXX Corps was headquartered in Sialkot Cantonment, and took over the area of responsibility for the strategic areas of Indian Administered Jammu and Kashmir (extending from Jhelum to Narowal) that was previously overseen by the I Corps. With I Corps becoming part of the strategic army reserves, the XXX Corps was relocated and has now been headquartered in Gujranwala Cantonment since 1987.

Thus, the XXX Corps was given the command of the formations that were detached from I Corps, which was then dedicated to offensive tasks. The XXX Corps is known for its ability to conduct mechanized and the riverine operations. Its mission parameters also included preventing the Indian Army's mechanized divisions from advancing into Pakistan to cut the vital Lahore-Karachi links— the North-South links.

== Structure ==
Its present order of battle is as follows:

Structure of XXX Corps
Corps	Corps HQ	Corps Commander	Assigned Units	Unit HQ
XXX Corps	Gujranwala	Lt.Gen Syed Tahir Hameed Shah		
XXX Corps	Gujranwala	Lt.Gen Syed Tahir Hameed Shah	15th Infantry Division	Sialkot
XXX Corps	Gujranwala	Lt.Gen Syed Tahir Hameed Shah	8th Infantry Division	Sialkot
XXX Corps	Gujranwala	Lt.Gen Syed Tahir Hameed Shah	54th Independent Infantry Brigade	Sialkot
XXX Corps	Gujranwala	Lt.Gen Syed Tahir Hameed Shah	19th Independent Armoured Brigade	Pasrur
XXX Corps	Gujranwala	Lt.Gen Syed Tahir Hameed Shah	Independent Anti-tank Brigade	U/I Location
XXX Corps	Gujranwala	Lt.Gen Syed Tahir Hameed Shah	Independent Engineering Brigade	U/I Location
XXX Corps	Gujranwala	Lt.Gen Syed Tahir Hameed Shah	Independent Signal Brigade	U/I Location

== List of Commanders ==
Lieutenant-General	Commander XXX Corps	Term start	Term end
Lieutenant-General	Syed Tahir Hameed Shah	Ocotober 2026	Incumbent
Lieutenant-General	Syed Imdad Hussain Shah	December 2023	Ocotober 2026
Lieutenant-General	Muhammad Aamer	October 2021	December 2023
Lieutenant-General	Asim Munir	June 2019	October 2021
Lieutenant-General	Aamir Abbasi	December 2017	June 2019
Lieutenant-General	Ikram Ul Haq	September 2015	December 2017
Lieutenant-General	Ghayur Mahmood	October 2014	September 2015
Lieutenant-General	Salim Nawaz	July 2013	October 2014
Lieutenant-General	Muzammil Hussain	October 2012	July 2013
Lieutenant-General	Raheel Sharif	October 2010	October 2012
Lieutenant-General	Jamil Haider	April 2010	October 2010
Lieutenant-General	Nadeem Taj	October 2008	April 2010
Lieutenant-General	Waseem Ahmad Ashraf	April 2007	October 2008
Lieutenant-General	Anis Ahmed Abbasi	September 2005	April 2007
Lieutenant-General	Mohammad Sabir	October 2004	September 2005
Lieutenant-General	Javed Hassan	January 2004	October 2004
Lieutenant-General	Munir Khan	March 2003	January 2004
Lieutenant-General	Faiz Jilani Malik	October 2001	March 2003
Lieutenant-General	Abdul Qadir Baloch	January 2001	October 2001
Lieutenant-General	Agha Jehangir Khan	April 1998	January 2001
Lieutenant-General	Naeem Akbar Khan	March 1997	April 1998
Lieutenant-General	Ziauddin Butt	February 1996	March 1997
Lieutenant-General	Javed Ashraf Qazi	August 1995	February 1996
Lieutenant-General	Mohammad Tariq SJ	May 1993	August 1995
Lieutenant-General	Hamid Niaz	May 1992	May 1993
Lieutenant-General	Chaudhry Sardar Ali	November 1990	May 1992
Lieutenant-General	Pir Dad Khan SJ	March 1988	November 1990
Lieutenant-General	Imtiaz Waraich	July 1987	March 1988
