= Javed Ashraf Qazi =

Pakistani politician

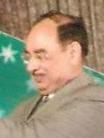
- Qazi in 2012
- Born: 4 September 1941 (age 85); Shimla, Punjab, British India
- Military career
- Allegiance: Pakistan
- Branch: Pakistan Army
- Service years: 1962 – 1996
- Rank: Lieutenant General
- Service number: PA – 6496
- Unit: Regiment of Artillery
- Commands: DG Military Intelligence; Master General of Ordnance; DG ISI; Commander XXX Corps
- Conflicts: Indo-Pakistan War of 1965; Indo-Pakistan War of 1971
- Awards: Hilal-i-Imtiaz; Sitara-e-Basalat
- Other work: Politician and Member of Parliament of Pakistan; Federal Minister for Education and Communications

Javed Ashraf Qazi (Urdu: جاوید اشرف قاضی), HI(M), SBt, (born 4 September 1941) is a Pakistani military officer and politician who served as a senator during Pervez Musharraf administration. He also served as a cabinet minister, first as Communications Minister (2000–2002) and then as Education Minister (2004–2007). Previously, during his army career, Qazi headed the ISI from 1993 to 1995 and Military Intelligence from 1990 to 1991.

== Military career ==
Qazi joined Pakistan Military Academy after graduating from Cadet College Hasan Abdal. He was commissioned in the Pakistan Army April 1962 in the 25th PMA Long Course in the Regiment of Artillery. He later rose in his career to be the DG Military Intelligence under General Mirza Aslam Beg in 1990. Promoted to Lieutenant General in 1992, Qazi served as Master-General of Ordnance (MGO) from 1992 to 1993. He was then brought in to head the ISI by General Abdul Waheed Kakar in May 1993. General Abdul Waheed Kakar mandated Qazi not only to cleanse the ISI of "Islamists" but to rein in the "Jihadis" in Kashmir.

Qazi left the post in 1995 to assume the command of XXX Corps at Gujranwala. Qazi retired from the army in February 1996.

== Political career ==
Qazi started his political career after taking over as the Secretary of Science and Technology Division in 1996. He continued this post under Prime Minister Nawaz Sharif until 1997. He was later inducted as the Secretary of Railways in October 1999 by the new military leader General Pervez Musharraf, which he continued until 2000.

Then he became the Minister of Communications and Railways in addition to Housing and Works from 2000 to 2002. He successfully fought the Senate seat in 2003, and became a senator on Pakistan Muslim League (Q) seat.

The government later inducted him as Minister of Education in 2004 replacing Zubaida Jalal. His three-year stint ended in 2007, when the 5-year mandate for PML-Q government ended. He later was senator of PMLQ political party.

== Controversies ==
During his tenure as Federal Education Minister in General Pervez Musharraf's cabinet, Mr. Qazi stirred up controversy when in a talk show he erroneously mentioned that Quran has 40 parts (Juz') instead of 30.

He was accused of transferring tens of hundreds of acres of prime railway land in Lahore to a Malaysian firm during General Musharraf's regime in 2001 for development of a golf course called Royal Palms Gold and Country Club.

Railway Golf course was on lease for Rs 12 per year to an association of retired railway officers. This lease was cancelled by the Railway Executive Committee and was awarded to a Malaysian firm after a bidding process. A case was initiated against the minister and Railway executive committee for misuse of power but was cleared by Accountability court as there were no allegations of corruption.

Military offices
Preceded by Javed Nasir	Director General of the Inter-Services Intelligence; 1993 – 1995	Succeeded by Naseem Rana
