= Shakir Ullah Khattak =

Pakistani military person

- Born: Karak, Khyber Pakhtunkhwa, Pakistan
- Alma mater: Cadet College Kohat; Pakistan Military Academy; Command and Staff College Quetta; National Defence University (Pakistan)
- Military career
- Allegiance: Pakistan
- Branch: Pakistan Army
- Service years: 1991 — present
- Rank: Lieutenant General
- Units: 13 Lancers, AC
- Commands: Commander, I Corps, Mangla; Chairman Heavy Industries Taxila; DG-Analysis, ISI; General Officer Commanding 7th Infantry Division
- Conflicts: Operation Zarb-e-Azb; Operation Radd-ul-Fasaad; Khyber 4; Afghanistan–Pakistan border skirmishes; 2020–2021 U.S. troop withdrawal from Afghanistan
- Awards: Hilal-i-Imtiaz

Shakir Ullah Khattak is a Lieutenant General of the Pakistan Army currently serving as the Corps Commander of I Corps. He previously served as the chairman of Heavy Industries Taxila.

== Military career ==
Khattak was commissioned in the 13th Lancers in 1991. As a Major General, he commanded the 7th Infantry Division at Waziristan during Operation Radd-ul-Fasaad. Under Khattak's command sensitive North-Waziristan portion of Afghanistan-Pakistan border fence was completed in 2020.

Major-General Shakirullah Khattak served as the Director-General Analysis directorate (DG-A) of Inter-Service Intelligence from 2021 to 2023.

Upon getting promotion to Lieutenant General, he had assumed the office of the Chairman, Heavy Industries Taxila, from 2023 to October 2026. In October 2026, he assumed the office of Corps Commander, I Corps Mangla, replacing Lieutenant General Nauman Zakaria.
