= Nadeem Ahmad =

Pakistani Army general

Lieutenant General Nadeem Ahmad HI(M) SE TBt
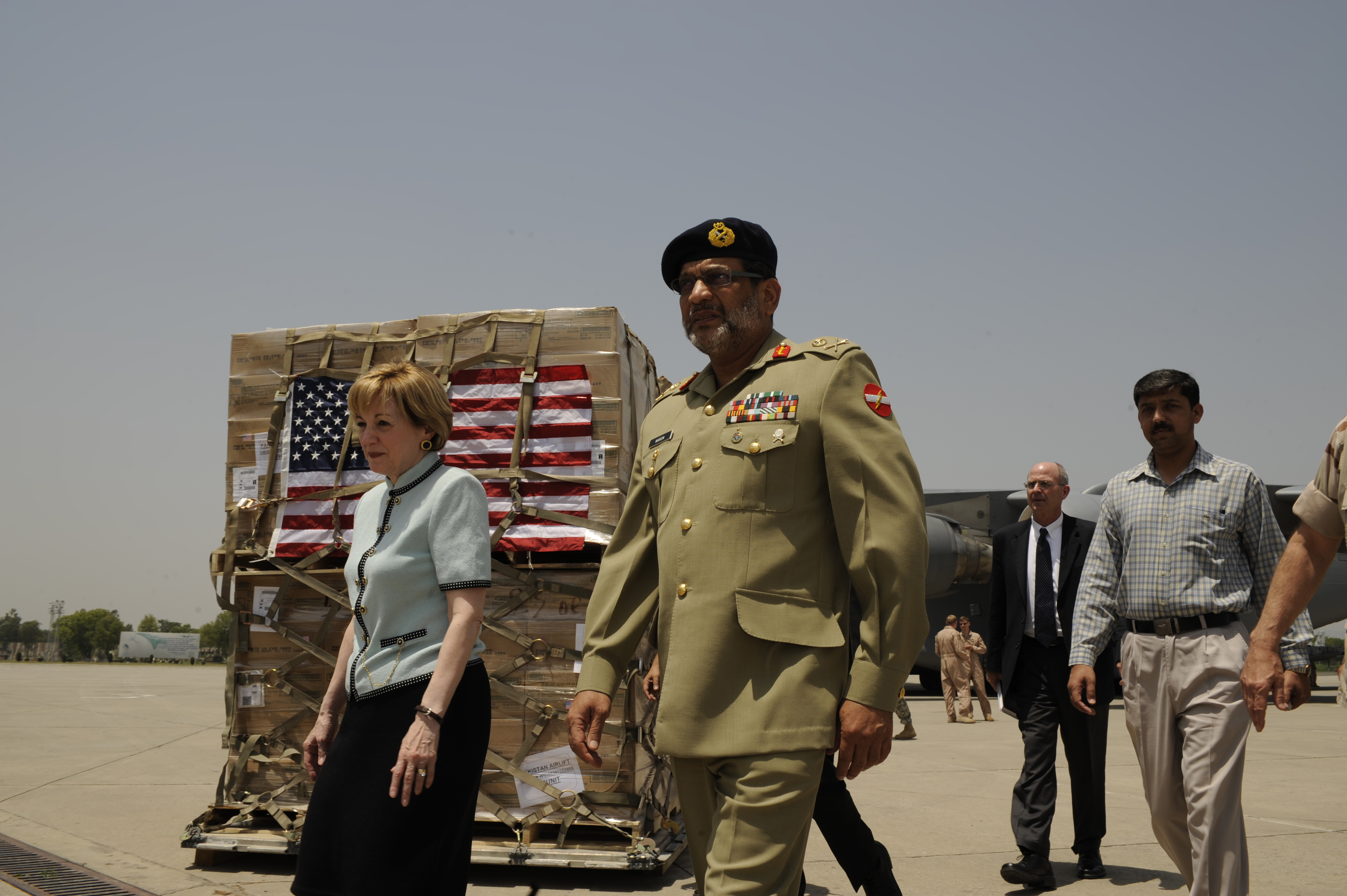
- Military career
- Allegiance: Pakistan
- Branch: Pakistan Army
- Service years: 1971–2010
- Rank: Lieutenant General
- Unit: Sind Regiment
- Commands: 10th Infantry Division, Lahore; Northern Military Command, Gilgit; Anti-Narcotics Force (DG ANF); Vice Chief of General Staff (VCGS); Earthquake Reconstruction and Rehabilitation Authority (ERRA); I Strike Corps, Mangla
- Conflicts: Indo-Pakistani War of 1971; Indo-Pakistani war of 1999; India-Pakistan standoff 2001; Pakistan earthquake 2005; War in North-West Pakistan
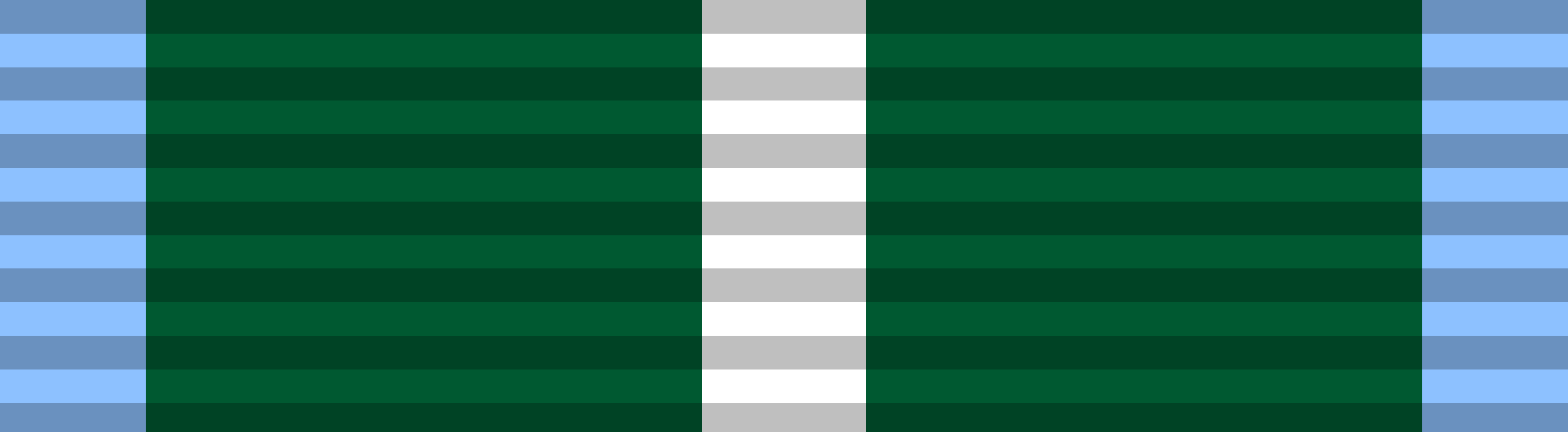
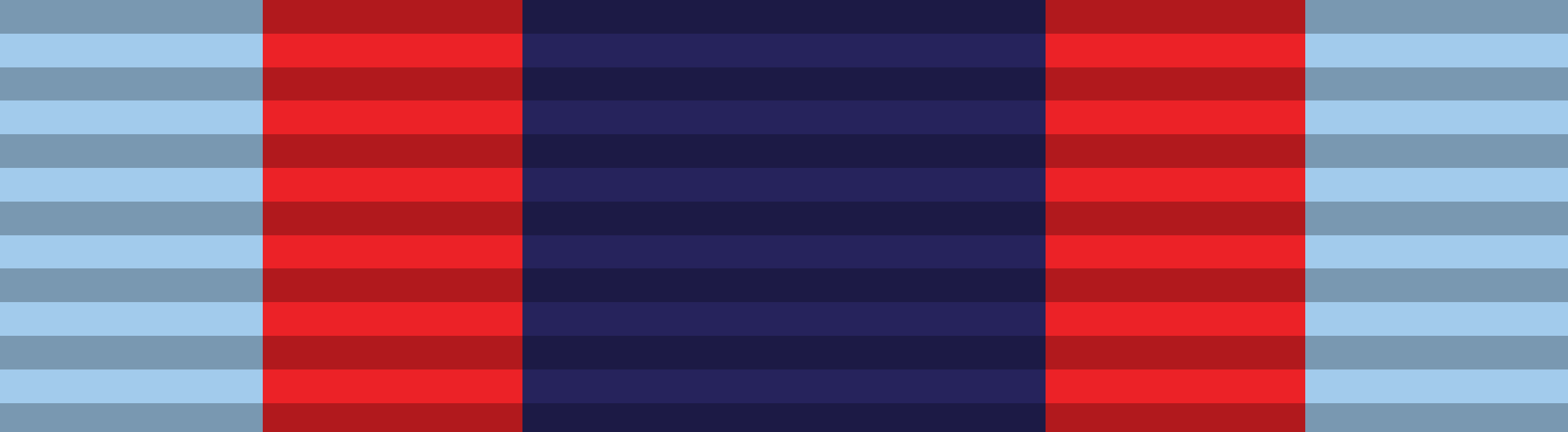
- Awards: Hilal-e-Imtiaz (Military) Sitara-e-Eisaar Tamgha-e-Basalat

Nadeem Ahmad (Urdu: نديم احمد) is a retired senior three-star ranking general officer who is famed and widely honored for planning and coordinating the relief and reconstruction non-combatant military operations after the devastating earthquake of October 2005. Securing the appointment as the director of Federal Relief Commission of Pakistan Army, his credentials secured him the directorship of the Earthquake Reconstruction and Rehabilitation Authority (ERRA). After serving in the military for nearly 40 years, he was duly appointed as the chairman of the National Disaster Management Authority (NDMA); his efforts included the successful disaster management and preparations to contain the nationwide 2010 floods and coordinate the rescue operations in the Hunza Valley, Attabad Lake, and the Airblue crash.

His other military staff appointments included the directorship of the Anti-Narcotics Force (ANF) and the vice-chief of general staff at the Army combatant headquarters (GHQ). His last military assignments included the field operations commander of the I Strike Corps at Mangla Cantt, until his retirement in May 2010. He commanded military operations in the war in north-west fronts and was the battlefield commander of the Special Support Group (SSG) for IDPs affected by the successful military operations in Swat and Waziristan.

== Career in the military ==
Nadeem Ahmad was commissioned in the Pakistan Army on 12 December 1971 in the 48th PMA Long Course in the Baloch Regiment, which later became the Sind Regiment. He commanded the Lahore Infantry Division as well as Force Commander Northern Areas (FCNA) in Gilgit from 2001 to 2003 and then as director general of the Anti-Narcotics Force (DG ANF) from 2003 to 2005. He was then called back into the Army and served as the Vice Chief of General Staff (VCGS) from 2005 to 2006. He was serving as VCGS when the fateful earthquake hit the Kashmir region on 8 October 2005. He later served as commander of the Mangla Corps from 2007 to 2009.

Nadeem Ahmad is a graduate of Command and Staff College, Quetta and College of EME, Rawalpindi besides holding two master's degrees in war studies, and strategic studies from National Defence College, Islamabad and U.S. Army War College, Carlisle, Pennsylvania. He is also recipient of an Honorary Doctorate in Disaster Management from University of Huddersfield, UK.

== Chief Military Coordinator of Federal Relief Commission (FRC) ==
Following the devastating Pakistan earthquake that killed 73,338 people, injured 128,304, and rendered 3.5 million people homeless, then Maj-Gen Nadeem Ahmad was appointed Chief Military Coordinator for the Military Wing of the Federal Relief Commission (FRC). The FRC at that time was headed by Lt Gen (R) Farooq Ahmad Khan, who was in-charge of relief efforts from the civilian side.

Maj-Gen Nadeem and the Pakistan Army worked with the United Nations and other representatives of national and international agencies, donor countries and NGOs, to plan and implement the massive relief operations. He is credited by some in the international community as having been the key player in organizing the Pakistan Government's response to the earthquake.

== Deputy Chairman ERRA ==
Following the relief phase, Nadeem was promoted to lieutenant general and appointed deputy chairman of Pakistan's Earthquake Reconstruction & Rehabilitation Authority (ERRA), the organization responsible for the $5bn reconstruction efforts. Under his leadership, ERRA planned, funded and implemented programmes for the reconstruction and rehabilitation of the 30,000 km^{2} (12,000 sq mi) devastated region of North West Frontier Province and Kashmir in twelve key sectors of Health, Education, Water & Sanitation, Social Protection, Telecommunications, Industry & Tourism, Livelihoods, Agriculture, Governance, Roads & Transportation, Power, and Environment, with cross-cutting themes of Gender Equity and Disaster Risk Reduction.

== Chairman Special Support Group for IDPs ==
On 11 May 2009, the Prime Minister of Pakistan, Yousuf Raza Gilani, appointed General Nadeem to head a Special Support Group (SSG) for Internally Displaced Persons (IDPs) at Federal Government level, to support to Provincial efforts to assist people displaced by the fighting in the Swat region of North West Frontier Province (NWFP). The Support Group's worked with government's agencies and departments, military, donors and international humanitarian organizations and communities, and to organise an International Donors Conference to raise funds to assist the IDPs. The Special Support Group is crowned for the successful return of over two million IDPs to Swat Region within a short period of two months.

The Special Support Group led the relief efforts for the dislocated families of Waziristan. Headquartered in Peshawar, it was the focal point for all operations relating to IDPs in Pakistan. Under the guidance and direction of chairman, the Special Support Group set new standards in Internally Displaced Persons relief, assistance and return.

== Chairman National Disaster Management Authority (NDMA) ==
Soon after retirement, the General was appointed as Chairman National Disaster Management Authority (NDMA), where he supervised the entire Relief and Early Recovery efforts during the 2010 Pakistan floods, the biggest disaster to have struck Pakistan, affecting 20 million people over an area of 100,000 km^{2} (39,000 sq mi).

He sought resignation in April 2011 after his request to bring ERRA under the NDMA was denied by the political and military leadership.

General Nadeem was a member of the Abbottabad Commission investigating the circumstances surrounding the 2 May 2011 killing of Osama bin Laden by United States Special Forces.

== Recognition for services ==
In recognition of his outstanding services to humanity, General Nadeem was awarded the nation's highest award, Sitara-e-Esar, by the president of Pakistan in 2006. In 2007, he was presented with the UN Habitat Scroll of Honour at The Hague, Netherlands and also the Shah-e-Hamdan Medal by the Government of Azad Kashmir.

General Nadeem has spoken at numerous conferences, seminars and workshops in Pakistan, the United Arab Emirates, Switzerland, United Kingdom, United States, China, Denmark, Australia, Nepal and Thailand on all aspects of Disaster Management in both natural disasters and complex emergencies.

== Awards and decorations ==

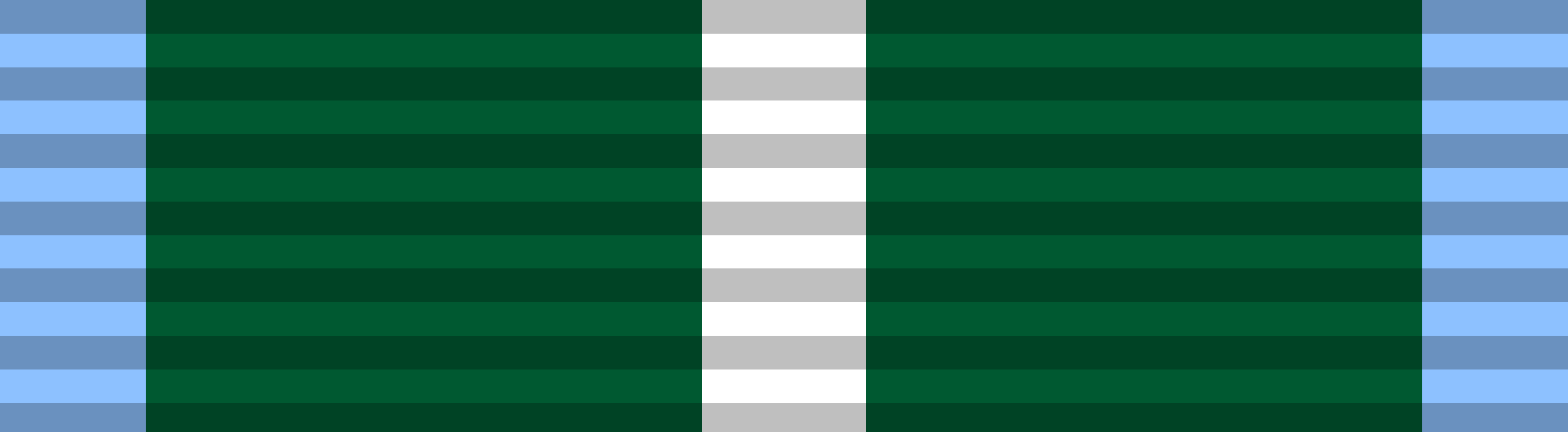

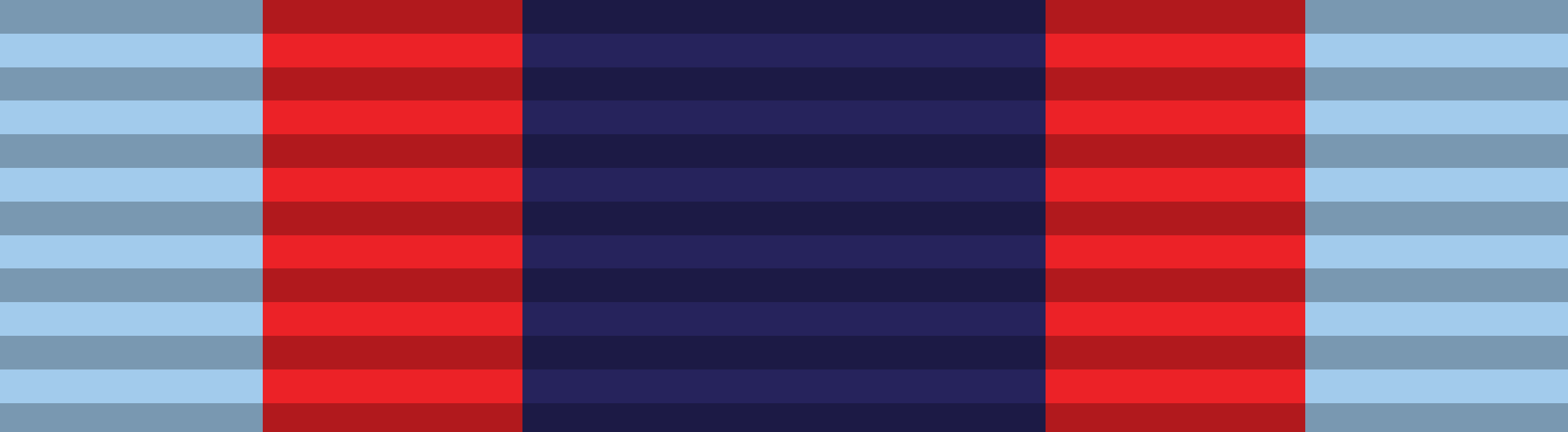

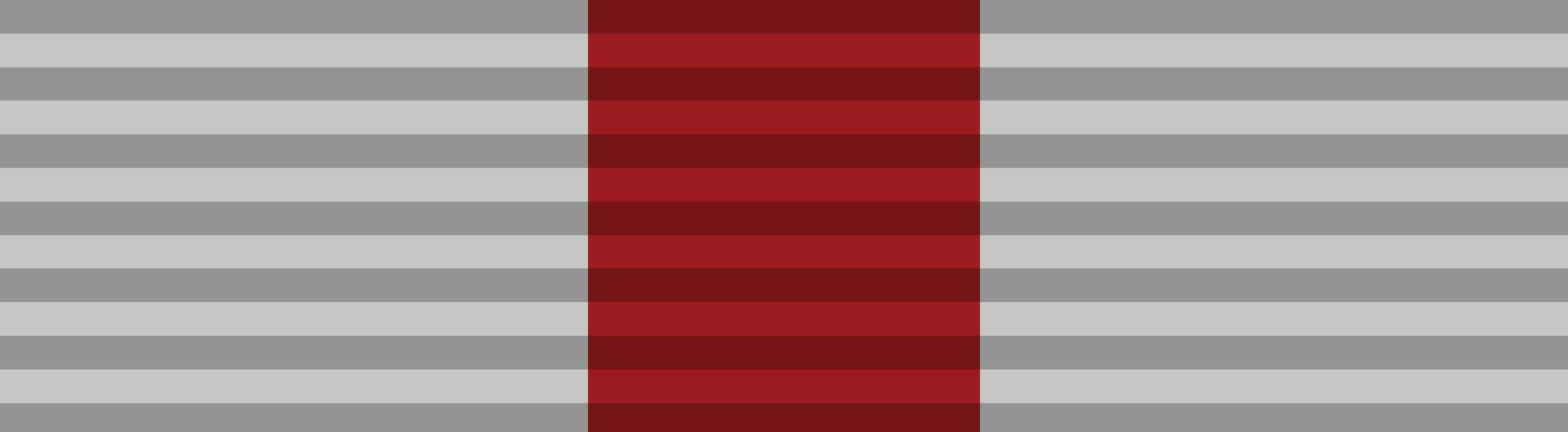

Hilal-e-Imtiaz (Military) (Crescent of Excellence)		Sitara-e-Eisaar (Star of Sacrifice)	
Tamgha-e-Basalat (Medal of Good Conduct)	Tamgha-e-Diffa (General Service Medal) Siachen Glacier Clasp	Sitara-e-Harb 1971 War (War Star 1971)	Tamgha-e-Jang 1971 War (War Medal 1971)
Tamgha-e-Diffa (General Service Medal) Siachen Glacier Clasp	Sitara-e-Harb 1971 War (War Star 1971)	Tamgha-e-Jang 1971 War (War Medal 1971)	Tamgha-e-Baqa (Nuclear Test Medal) 1998
Tamgha-e-Baqa (Nuclear Test Medal) 1998	Tamgha-e-Istaqlal Pakistan (Escalation with India Medal) 2002	10 Years Service Medal	20 Years Service Medal
30 Years Service Medal	35 Years Service Medal	Tamgha-e-Sad Saala Jashan-e- Wiladat-e-Quaid-e-Azam (100th Birth Anniversary of Muhammad Ali Jinnah)	Hijri Tamgha (Hijri Medal) 1979
Jamhuriat Tamgha (Democracy Medal) 1988	Qarardad-e-Pakistan Tamgha (Resolution Day Golden Jubilee Medal) 1990	Tamgha-e-Salgirah Pakistan (Independence Day Golden Jubilee Medal) 1997	Command and Staff College Quetta Centenary Student's Medal (2007)
