= I Corps (Pakistan) =

Pakistan Army's field maneuver strike corps

- Active: 1 July 1957; 69 years ago
- Country: Pakistan
- Branch: Pakistan Army
- Type: Strike Corps
- Role: Maneuver/deployment oversight.
- Size: ~50,000 approximately (Though this may vary as units are rotated)
- HQ/Garrison: Mangla Cantonment, Dina , Pakistan
- Nickname: Mangla Corps
- Colors Identification: Red, white and yellow
- Anniversaries: 1 July 1957
- Engagements: Indo-Pakistani War of 1965; Indo-Pakistani War of 1971 Indo-Pakistani border escalation of 2003 Indo-Pakistani skirmishes along the LOC 2016; Indo-Pakistani Standoff 2019 [Indo-Pakistani conflict of May 2025]]
- Decorations: Military Decorations of Pakistan military

Commanders
- Commander: Lt-Gen. Shakirullah Khattak
- Notable commanders: Pervez Musharraf; Nadeem Zaki; Bakhtiar Rana; Ejaz Azim; Nadeem Ahmad; Shamsur Rahman Kallu; Tariq Khan

Insignia
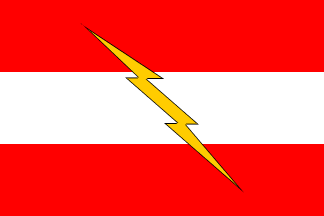
- Flag

The I Corps is a field corps of the Pakistan Army currently headquaretered in the Mangla Cantonment, Dina Tehsil in Pakistan. Formed in 1957 as one of the tenth deployment and maneuver strike corps, it is a major ground formation and has seen deployments in the wars between India and Pakistan from 1965 to 1971.

Currently, it is commanded by Lieutenant-General Shakirullah Khan Khattak.

== Brief history ==
=== Formations, deployments, and war service ===
After fighting battles briefly with the Indian Army in Kashmir during the Indo-Pakistani War, there was need for discipline and control of the military units from local headquarters than the Army GHQ in Rawalpindi.

Initially, it was established in Abbottabad Cantonment in 1957 with Lt-Gen. Azam Khan becoming its first field commander with an objective to maneuver the ground formations more effectively against the larger opposing force. Later headquartered in Mangla Cantonment in Azad Kashmir to strengthen the national defense lines, it is the first field corps in order of precedence of the Pakistan Army.

In 1965, the I Corps, under Lt-Gen. Bakhtiar Rana, was deployed and fought against the approaching Indian Army's advances during the war in 1965, almost commanding the entire Pakistan army's troops in Punjab and Kashmir.

In 1971, the I Corps, now under the command of Lt-Gen. Irshad Ahmed, saw its military deployments in Shakargarh sector and was supported with two infantry divisions and an armoured brigade to support the defenses of Pakistan's eastern border, the Punjab. The 15th Infantry Division was on the left side of the Corps' frontage around Sialkot with the 8th Infantry Division on the right, and 8th Armored Brigade in support. Further back, the Corps was additionally supported by the Pakistan Army Reserves, enforced by the 6th Armored Division and 17th Infantry Division. The Indian Army planned a major attack in the sector, which was managed by I Corps, but when the war broke out, the lead Indian Army's formation, 54th Infantry Division, only managed to advance a few kilometers—a total of 13 kilometres (8 mi) in two weeks of operations.

Meanwhile, while the Indian army's attacks went on, the reserve formations did very little to respond to such attacks with the 6th Armored Division remaining near Pasrur waiting for orders, while 17th Infantry Division had significant detachments sent off to 23rd Infantry Division on the left and IV Corps on the right.

Yet the fighting in Shakargarh, while ultimately successful as the Indian army's aims were thwarted, resulted in 8th Armoured Brigade's heavy loss of armour and some territory was also lost. As a result, its commander, Lt-Gen. Irshad Ahmed, was recommended for court martial and, later dismissal from his service.

After the 1971 war with India, the I Corps has not seen military actions, and has been stationed in Mangla ever since and is well trained for forest warfare techniques. As Pakistan's military strategic reserve, it was also not sent on overseas deployments under the United Nations with the allies.

== Structure ==
Since 1971, the I Corps has not seen the military action but has supported through its units to enforce the Line of Control, on secondment to Northern Command. The I Corps is an integral in forming the Pakistan Army Reserves, and the other military units in supporting the I Corps are organized in formation known as the Army Reserves North.

Flag of 17 INF DIV

Its order of battle (ORBAT) is:

Corps I Commander, Mangla
Lt.Gen Shakirullah Khan Khattak
Structure
Assigned Units	Unit Badge	Unit HQ
6th Armoured Division		Gujranwala
17th Infantry Division		Kharian
37th Mechanized Infantry Division		Kharian
Independent Infantry Brigade		U/I Location
Independent Armoured Brigade		U/I Location
Independent Artillery Brigade		U/I Location
Independent Air Defence Brigade		U/I Location
Independent Signal Brigade		U/I Location
Independent Engineering Brigade		U/I Location

== List of commanders ==
#	Name	Start of tenure	End of tenure
1	Lt Gen Azam Khan	July 1957	1958
2	Lt Gen Bakhtiar Rana	1958	1966
3	Lt Gen Abdul Hamid Khan	1966	March 1969
4	Lt Gen Tikka Khan	March 1969	August 1969
5	Lt Gen Attiqur Rahman	August 1969	February 1970
6	Lt Gen Irshad Ahmed Khan	February 1970	1972
7	Lt Gen Abdul Ali Malik	1972	1974
8	Lt Gen Azmat Baksh Awan	1974	March 1976
9	Lt Gen Ghulam Hassan Khan	March 1976	March 1980
10	Lt Gen Hafiz Ayan Ahmed	March 1980	April 1981
11	Lt Gen Shah Rafi Alam	April 1981	April 1982
12	Lt Gen Shamsur Rahman Kallu	April 1982	April 1986
13	Lt Gen Mohammad Aslam Shah	April 1986	May 1988
14	Lt Gen Zulfikar Akhtar Naz	May 1988	May 1992
15	Lt Gen Khalid Latif Mughal	May 1992	October 1995
16	Lt Gen Pervez Musharraf	October 1995	October 1998
17	Lt Gen Saleem Haider	October 1998	September 1999
18	Lt Gen Tauqir Zia	September 1999	April 2001
19	Lt Gen Ghulam Mustafa	April 2001	April 2002
20	Lt Gen Javed Alam Khan	April 2002	April 2006
21	Lt Gen Sajjad Akram	April 2006	April 2008
22	Lt Gen Nadeem Ahmad	April 2008	April 2010
23	Lt Gen Mohammad Mustafa Khan	April 2010	October 2010
24	Lt Gen Tariq Khan	October 2010	October 2014
25	Lt Gen Hilal Hussain	October 2014	September 2015
26	Lt Gen Umar Farooq Durrani	September 2015	April 2017
27	Lt Gen Azhar Saleh Abbasi	April 2017	October 2018
28	Lt Gen Nadeem Zaki Manj	October 2018	November 2019
29	Lt Gen Shaheen Mazhar Mehmood	November 2019	September 2022
30	Lt.Gen Ayman Bilal Safdar	September 2022	May 2024
31	Lt Gen Nauman Zakaria	May 2024	October 2026
32	Lt Gen Shakirullah Khan Khattak	October 2026	Incumbent
