= Hamood Uz Zaman Khan =

Secretary of Defence, Pakistan
- In office August 24, 2022 – August 23, 2024
- Preceded by: Lt Gen Humayun Aziz
- Succeeded by: Amer Ashfaq Kayani

Personal details
- Education: Pakistan Command and Staff College, National Defence University, Islamabad, National Defence University
- Awards: Hilal-i-Imtiaz (Military)

Hamood Uz Zaman Khan is a retired Pakistan Army general who served as a Secretary of Defence and as a federal secretary of the Ministry of Defence Production.

== Career ==
=== Military ===
Khan was commissioned in the Army Air Defense on 11 September 1986 in 98 Light AD Regiment . During his tenure in the Pakistan Army, he held the position of Staff Officer within an Infantry Brigade, was part of the Military Operation Directorate, and acted as the Chief of Staff at the Army Air Defence Command Headquarters. His service extended to international peacekeeping efforts, where he was a Military Observer in DR Congo under the auspices of the United Nations. His leadership roles included commanding a self-propelled Air Defence Regiment, leading an Air Defence Brigade and an Infantry Brigade, overseeing an Air Defence Division, and managing the Army Air Defence Command Headquarters. Additionally, he served as Director General Weapons & Equipment at the General Headquarters.

=== National Command & Operation Centre (NCOC) ===
Khan has the distinction of establishing and operating the National Command and Operation Center (NCOC) during the COVID-19 pandemic. During his tenure at NCOC, he effectively planned and coordinated strategies to combat the pandemic.

=== Federal Secretary ===
He also served as Federal Secretary, of the Ministry of Defense Production. He replaced Lt Gen (retd) Humayun Aziz, who had completed his contract as secretary of the ministry.

=== Secretary of Defence ===
He was appointed Defense Secretary by Prime Minister Shehbaz Sharif. He was appointed on a two-year contract and assumed charge of his post on August 24, 2022 and continued to serve in the capacity till August 2024.

== Controversies ==
In March 2023, the Ministry of Defense informed the Election Commission of Pakistan (ECP), headed by him, that the Pakistan Army would not be available for election duty during 2023 due to the "situation in the country", noting that the security of the borders and the country was the army's "first priority".

In December 2023, a contempt of court petition was filed against him for allegedly violating a Supreme Court order to try the May 9 riots accused in criminal courts.

== Awards and honors ==
- Hilal-i-Imtiaz (Military)
