= 24th Cavalry (Frontier Force) =

Regiment of the Pakistan Army

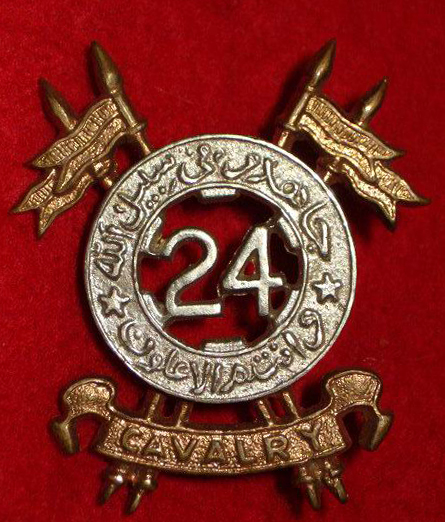
- Badge of 24th Cavalry
- Active: 7 June 1962 – present
- Country: Pakistan
- Branch: Pakistan Army
- Type: Armoured Regiment
- Nickname: The Chargers
- Mottos: "We shall live and die for the glory of Pakistan"
- Engagements: Operation Desert Hawk; Indo-Pakistani War of 1965

Insignia
- Colors of 24 Cavalry

The 24th Cavalry (Frontier Force) is a regiment of the Pakistan Army, raised on June 7, 1962. It was one of the armoured regiments assembled and trained following independence to meet Pakistan's growing defense needs. The officer selected to train and command the new unit was Lt Col Muhammad Afzal Khan (Probyn's Horse). The 24th Cavalry was involved in the first ever tank assault in the history of the Pakistan army earning it its title of "The Charging 24th Cavalry" as it was the first Armoured regiment of Pakistan Army to fight Trans-frontier. It was proved to be the best cavalry unit against India.

== History ==
=== Early period ===
24th Cavalry was raised in Nowshera and was equipped with M48 Patton tanks. The bulk of men and equipment for the 24th Cavalry came from the 11th Cavalry, 12th Cavalry, and 15th Lancers also provided some weapons. A variety of battle functions were allotted to the regiment. These included attack or counterattack under hostile fire, destruction of enemy armor by fire, exploitation after breakthrough, delaying action in a mobile battle, deep penetration in rear areas, and support to infantry and other units by use of direct or indirect fire, maneuver, and shock action.

=== Early training ===
The regiment went out for its first collective training in December 1962. The commandant gave out his training objectives for the first collective training period as follows:

- Integration of tank crews and recce troop crews.
- Troop training – culminating into a troop proficiency exercise.
- Tank/infantry cooperation drills to be practiced at squadron/battalion level.

The collective training had shown that the regiment had been converted into a well knit team. Equipment had been tested as well to ensure the regiment was prepared for war. The Commandant took the regiment to the Armored Fighting Vehicle Ranges in January 1963. It was a successful firing exercise and there was not a single accident during the whole exercise.

=== Patton tanks ===
Sherman tanks were used by 24th Cavalry until 1963. In March 1964, the unit got the first complement of M-47 Pattons.

=== Battle of Biar Bet ===
In April 1965, fighting broke out over the then disputed Rann of Kutch area. The 24th Cavalry got its first opportunity to prove itself in the battlefield and put its professional training and efficiency to test. On April 17, it received an order to deploy at Chhor (which was 800 miles towards Pakistan's southern border) and to conduct the Army's first ever tactical maneuver; a tank assault. On 26 April 1965, A squadron of 24th Cavalry along with forces from the 15 Punjab Regiment and 15 FFR launched an attack on territory occupied by Indian forces. It was the first attack of its kind since Independence, an attack on a heavily defended enemy position called "Biar Bet". The tanks captured the area after a grim battle during which its officers and soldiers showed unusual bravery. After a ceasefire brokered by the United Kingdom, Biar Bet was returned as part of an agreement between Pakistan and India.

=== Khem Karan September 1965 ===
The unit was under 1st Armoured Division at Raiwind. As part of 5 Armored Brigade, it took part in operations across Rohi Nullah in Kasur Sector. In this operation by significant personal gallantry, Major Khadim Hussain destroyed three enemy tanks with an abandoned recoilless rifle and was awarded with Sitara-i-Jurat.

=== Collective training 1966 ===
The regiment moved out for collective training on 31 Oct 1966. This training was concentrated as usual at the troop level. Iranian Army Officers visited the regiment in training area on 7 Nov 1966 and were visibly impressed by the high standard of operational readiness displayed by all ranks. A demonstration was also given to Staff College students at Ranges on 22 Nov 1966. This process of exercises continued and built up to regimental exercise.

=== Participation in Pakistan Day Parade ===
The major event that the regiment participated in early 1968 was the Pakistan Day Parade. The RHQ and A Squadron participated in the Joint Services Pakistan Day Parade as a mechanized column from Armoured Corps. The turn out and formation of the regiment was commended by all spectators and the mechanized column was one of the most impressive spectacles of the parade.

=== Visits ===
- In April and May 1973 there were many visits and training events. A team of nine officers of the Royal Jordanian Army visited the regiment at ranges and saw a demonstration of firing of 23 mm Sub Caliber device. In June 1973 the regiment moved for Summer Collective Training which was found to be a very useful for all ranks. A visit was also arranged to Khewra Salt Mines on 10 June 1973.
- In Dec 1973 Gen Hassan Ali Shamiari Chief of Staff Saudi Arabian Army and 10 officers witnessed a demonstration on deep water fording which was greatly appreciated by the visitors and the GOC.
- In May 1974, an Egyptian delegation visited the regiment and witnessed sub caliber firing.
- A team of United States Army Officers visited the regiment and witnessed the deep water fording demonstration at Kharian on 21 Aug 1976.
- On 1 Feb 1977 General O Jin U Minister of Defence, Democratic People's Republic of Korea (North Korea) with high powered delegation and COAS General Muhammad Zia Ul Haq and various high-ranking officers visited the regiment to see training organization. Assembly line training and Sub Calibre Firing were demonstrated. The standard of firing was highly commended by the visitors. A regiment plaque was presented to General O Jin U by Lieutenant Colonel Javed Tipoo. A trophy was presented to 24 Cavalry by Korean General for the regiment's outstanding performance.
- In Nov 1977 a delegation of Iranian Army visited the regiment led by Major General Ali Khursand. They were shown the motor pool and short range area.
- On 20 Jan 1979 a high-powered delegation from CENTO visited the regiment. The Corps Commander and GOC were also present. The visitors were visibly impressed by the standard of training and maintenance that they witnessed.
- On 9 Jan 1980 an eminent author of United States, Professor Stephan P. Cohen who was writing a book on the Pakistan and Indian armies visited the regiment. He was shown assembly line training and sub caliber firing, besides a presentation on the organization of the Armoured Regiment and class composition. He took keen interest in meeting soldiers of various classes.
- On 26 Feb 1980, President of Pakistan General Muhammad Zia-ul-Haq visited the Regiment.
