= Earthquake Reconstruction & Rehabilitation Authority =

Pakistani institution responsible for earthquake affected areas

- زلزلہ بحالیات و تعمیرِنو مختاریہ

Agency overview
- Formed: 24 October 2005; 21 years ago
- Preceding agency: Cabinet of Pakistan
- Jurisdiction: Constitution of Pakistan
- Headquarters: Islamabad, Pakistan
- Agency executive: Lt Gen Akhtar Nawaz HI(M), Chairman
- Parent agency: National Disaster Management Authority
- Website: www.erra.gov.pk

Earthquake Reconstruction & Rehabilitation Authority (ERRA) (Urdu: زلزلہ بحالیات و تعمیرِنو مختاریہ) is federal institution of Pakistan tasked and responsible for the operational planning, coordinating, monitoring, and regulating the reconstruction and rehabilitation operations in the earthquake affected areas of the country.

Codified under the Article 89(1) by the Constitution of Pakistan, the institute is chaired by the appointed and designated Chairman who directly reports to the Prime Minister of Pakistan. As of present, the institution is currently chaired by Lt Gen Akhtar Nawaz as its appointed and designated Chairman.

On 24 November, Prime Minister Imran Khan approved the merger of ERRA with the National Disaster Management Authority.

== History ==
ERRA served as the apex institution for formulating the national earthquake public policy for the government and managed financial funds for the efforts and operations involved in the reconstruction programmes. Established on 24 October 2005 as a direct response to the 2005 Kashmir earthquake (7.6 on the Richter Scale) in north-western Pakistan, ERRA coordinated its largest operation to rebuild and reconstruct the 28,000-km^{2} earthquake effected area (equalling the size of the Netherlands and Belgium put together). Its first earthquake operations were coordinated and executed by Lieutenant-General Nadeem Ahmad who was also its first appointed chairman from its inception, till April 2008, when Lt-Gen Sajjad Akram took over as deputy chairman. He stayed there till April 2010 when Lt Gen Haroon Aslam took over as its 3rd deputy chairman.

Unlike other agencies created ad-hoc for post-disaster recovery (e.g. Canterbury Earthquake Recovery Authority or CERA of New Zealand and Badan Rehabilitasi dan Rekonstruksi or BRR of Indonesia), ERRA was institutionalized as a permanent government agency to handle post-disaster recovery on 14 March 2011. This was facilitated through Act No. V of 2011: An Act to provide for the establishment of the Earthquake Reconstruction and Rehabilitation Authority.
