= Battle of Bajaur =

Pakistani military operation

Battle of Bajaur (Operation Sherdil)
- Part of the Insurgency in Khyber Pakhtunkhwa
- Bajaur is the yellow colored region
Date	7 August 2008 – 28 February 2009 (6 months and 3 weeks)
Location	Bajaur, Khyber-Pakhtunkhwa Province, Pakistan
Result	Pakistani victory

Belligerents
Pakistan	TTP; Al-Qaeda; TNSM

Commanders and leaders
MG Tariq Khan; B.Gen. Abid Mumtaz; B.Gen. Zafar ul haq Col Nauman Saeed	Faqir Mohammed; Abu Saeed Al-Masri

Units involved
Ministry of Defence; Pakistan Armed Forces; Pakistan Army; 26th Infantry Brigade; Pakistan Air Force; (Pakistan) Ministry of Interior; Civil Armed Forces; Frontier Corps; FCKP (N)	TTP; Al-Qaeda; TNSM

Strength
9,000–15,000	~4,000

Casualties and losses
30 killed and 4 wounded (Pakistan army)	1,500 killed and 2,000 wounded (Militants)

The Battle of Bajaur (English: Operation Lion Heart), also known as Operation Sherdil, was a military campaign in the Bajaur region of Pakistan. It was conducted on 7 August 2008 by the Frontier Corps and Infantry Brigade of Pakistan army. The operation was primarily launched to end the political movement of the Tehrik-e-Taliban Pakistan. Bajaur area was administered by Tehrik-e-Taliban Pakistan until 2007, and it remained Al-Qaeda's central command and control for carrying out activities in Northeast Afghanistan and Kunar province. Recent reports indicate that ongoing conflict has newly displaced an estimate of 7,000 people between 3 and 4 March in Nurgal district.

== Ambush in Bajaur ==
During the early days of August in 2008, a check-post was established by the Frontier Corps to seize control of the Afghan-Pakistan border crossing over Tehrik-e-Taliban. Check-post was constructed near the town of Loyesam which is 12 km away from Khaar. Loyesam (or Loisam) is a strategic position that controls passage into Afghanistan's Kunar province. The militant attacks caused heavy casualties to the Pakistani army. Eventually, the army was relocated to Khar town.

== Background ==
Several days later, the Frontier Corps began a large-scale offensive under the command of Major-General Tariq Khan, codenamed Operation Sherdil (Lion heart), intending to regain control of Bajaur from the Taliban. About 8,000 troops belonging to the FC and Army, backed by Cobra attack helicopters and fighter jets were deployed that attacked Taliban hideouts. To support the Army, the Pakistan Air Force responded with aggressive air campaign. Pakistani military sources revealed that the army was surprised by the resistance of the insurgents. Taliban used advanced tactics to fight prepared defense system.

By the end of the year, the Army claimed that it had killed more than 1,000 militants, including the foreign commander of Al Qaeda, an Egyptian called Abu Saeed Al-Masri. The Army suffered 20 casualties. The military encouraged local tribes to rebel against the Taliban by raising the lashkars (tribal militias) to fight alongside the government forces. The Salarzai tribe reportedly counted 4,000 armed fighters, responded favorably to this initiative. On 7 October, the Salarzai elders announced that they had cleared their tribal territory of militants, and requested the deployment of government troops to consolidate the gains they had made.

According to several sources, the Islamabad Marriott Hotel bombing might have occurred in retaliation for the military offensive in Bajaur.

On 8 October, during a briefing to the Parliament, the military announced that the operation killed 2,744 militants, including 321 foreigners, and caused 1,400 casualties to the militants. On 25 October, the Pakistan forces reportedly recaptured Taliban militants in Loi Sam village. About 500 militants were reportedly killed in the Bajaur area on 25 October. By the end of 2008, security forces were stationed at Torghudai, Nawagai, Utmankhel, and Salarzai. By mid-2009, the security forces controlled the bulk of the Mamund and Chahrmang valleys as well. The last operation was launched in February 2010 with fresh reinforcements to mop up the last pockets of militants, including the notorious Damadola stronghold. Bajaur was ultimately declared clear in March 2010. When the operation was completed, a large number of militants surrendered before the army.

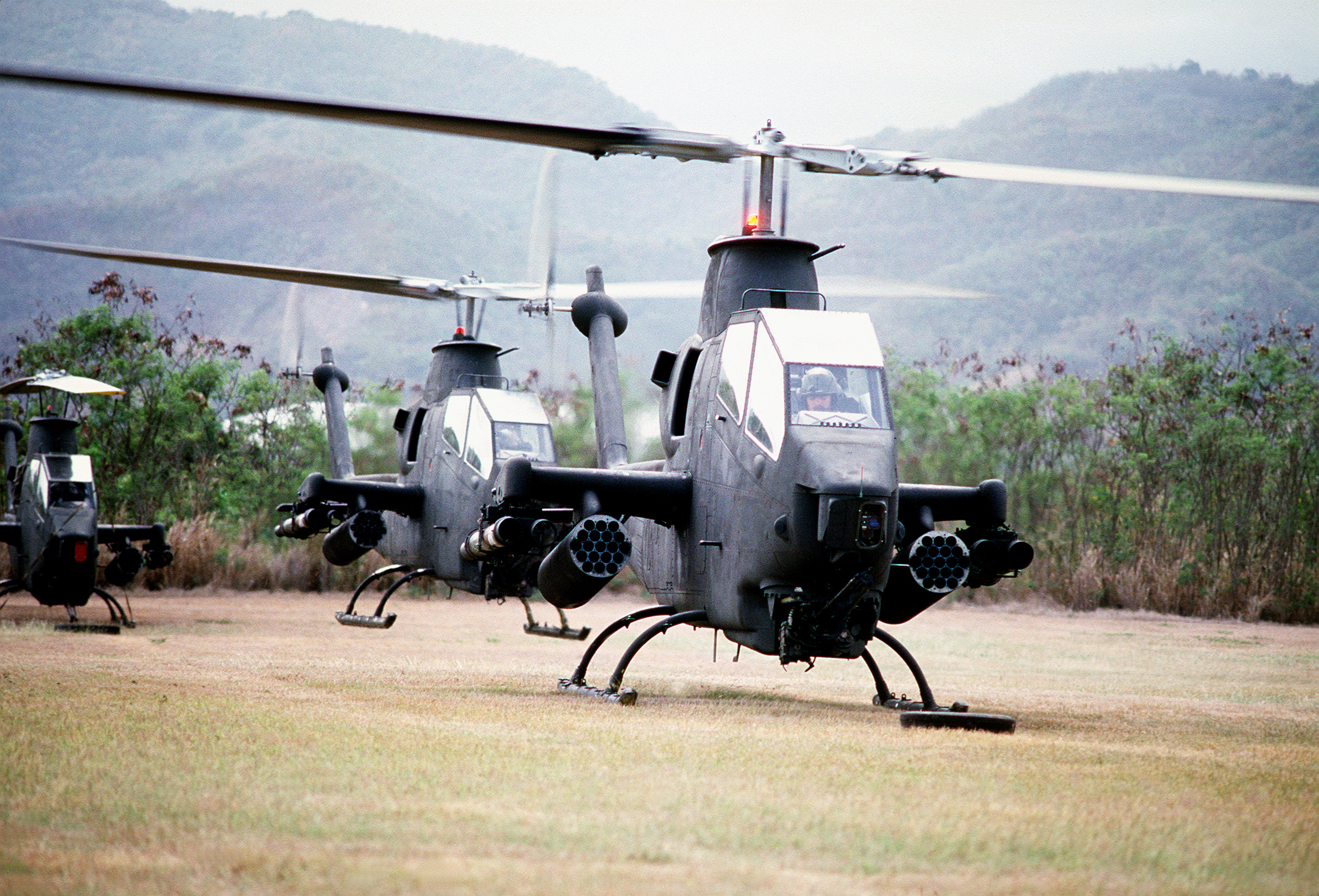
Pakistan Army's Aviation Corps used Cobra gunship attack helicopters extensively to pacify high-altitude mountain ridges occupied by the militants.

== Strategic significance ==
The opinion of military leaders in the early stages of the battle asserted that it was a decisive confrontation of Pakistan's war against the Taliban. Military officials allegedly said the conflict "could decide the fate of other tribal areas" with Bajaur possibly being the most crucial militant stronghold outside of Waziristan.

The influx of Taliban fighters from the Kunar province across the border of Afghanistan was viewed as a further sign that dictated the nature of the fight by diverting resources away from fighting with International Security Assistance Force.

== Results ==
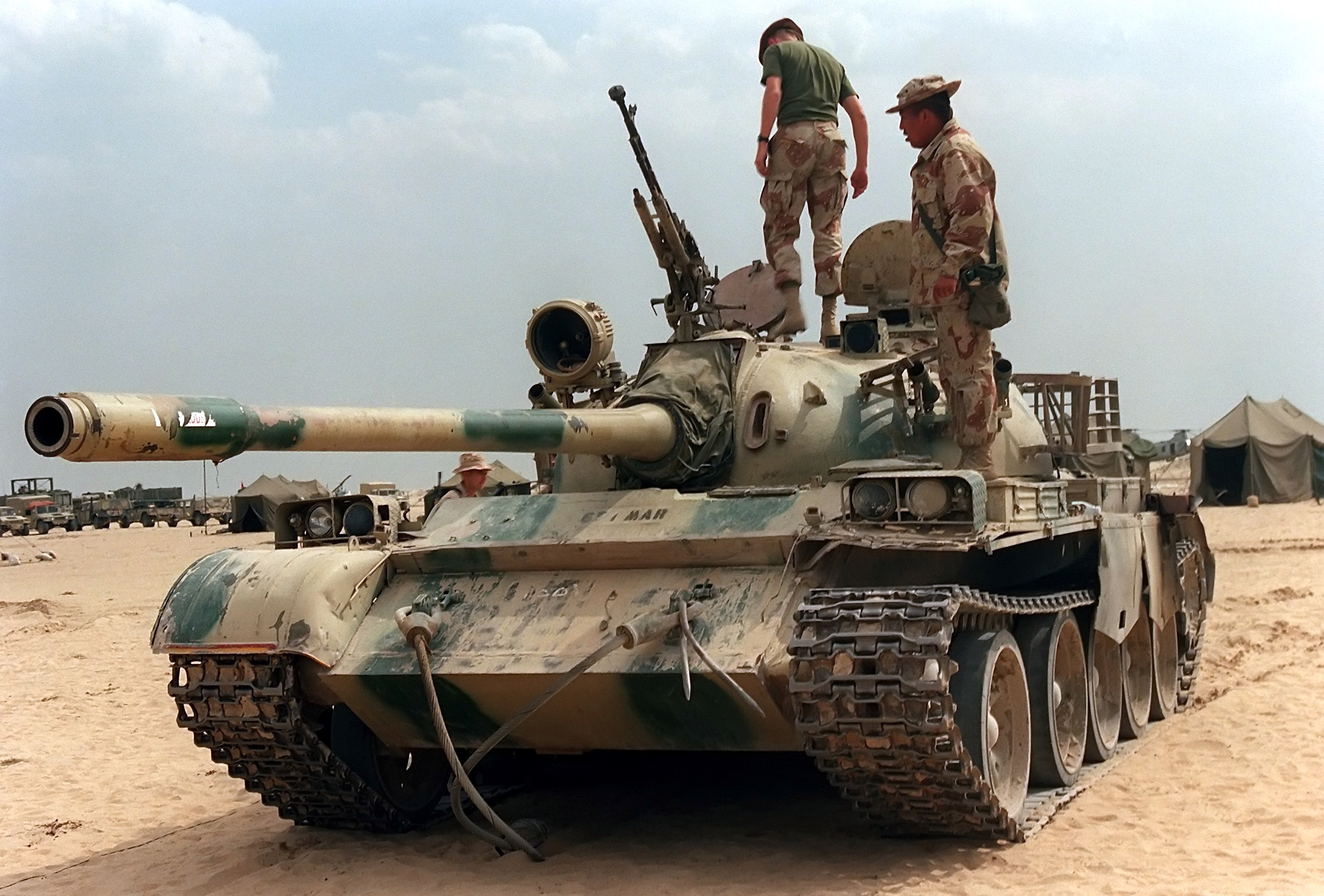
Pakistan Army used Type 69 tanks during Operation Sherdil in support of ground troops and Frontier Corps.

On 28 February 2009, the security forces defeated the Taliban and other Islamist militants in Bajaur, which was a strategically important region on the Afghan border. Major-General Tariq Khan, who was commanding the military operations in five of the seven agencies stated that the Army and the Frontier Corps killed most militants in Bajaur, the smallest of the agencies but a major infiltration route into Afghanistan, after a six-month long offensive. The Pakistan Army killed over 1,800 militants. However, the forces suffered 30 deaths and four wounded.

== Leadership ==
=== Maj Gen. Tariq Khan ===
Gen. Tariq Khan served as the Inspector General of the Frontier Corps during Operation Sherdil. He is known as the architect of the Battle of Bajaur. He is primarily credited with transforming the Frontier Corps into a highly efficient and professional counter-terrorism force. He supervised all operations in Bajaur. His physical presence at the forward-most positions during critical stages of the battle was an inspiration for the junior leaders and a morale booster for the troops.

=== Brig. Abid Mumtaz ===
Brigadier Abid Mumtaz served as the officer commanding of Operation Sherdil in Bajaur. A commander noted for leading his troops from the front. He emerged an example of his dedication to service on 9 September 2008, when the leading forces under his command reached at Rashakai town. The militants disrupted the communication line at Nissarabad, and he chose to stay on the frontline. He personally led the frontline forces for 15 days and did not return to headquarters until communication line was restored. He was awarded for his gallant actions and is now serving as the Major General. Mumtaz also conducted Khyber 2 operation in Tirah Valley in 2015.

=== Brig. Zafar-Ul-Haq. ===
Brigadier Zafar-ul-Haq replaced Brig Abid Mumtaz on 24 February 2010. He launched several operations to completely wipe out the Taliban's presence in Bajaur and expanded the security forces in each area of Bajaur. Brigadier Zafar-Ul-Haq pushed the Taliban away from the local areas and has ensured safety for the local people.

=== Battalion Commanders ===
Battalion commanders who served in Operation Sherdil.

1. Lt Col Javed Baloch & Lt Col Munawar
2. Lt Col Anjum Saleem (34 Baloch)
3. Lt Col Nadir Khan, Lt Col Rashid
4. Lt Col Asad, Lt Col Ali, Lt Col Amjad

The dedication of combatant commanders helped the Bajaul Valley to end the terrorism.

=== Col. Nauman Saeed ===
Colonel Nauman Saeed served as the operation commandant in Bajaur, where he was posted in and was due to assume command on 14 August 2008. However, owing to extraordinary circumstances, he had to leave for Bajaur on 6 August 2008. Miscreants surrounded a party that was sent to establish a post in Loesam. Nauman led the link-up unit on 8 August 2008 after the previous day's failed link attempt.

The troops were ambushed at Tankhatta, where they retaliated and held their positions for over 8 hours against well-entrenched militants to facilitate previous infiltration of the party besieged at Loesam.

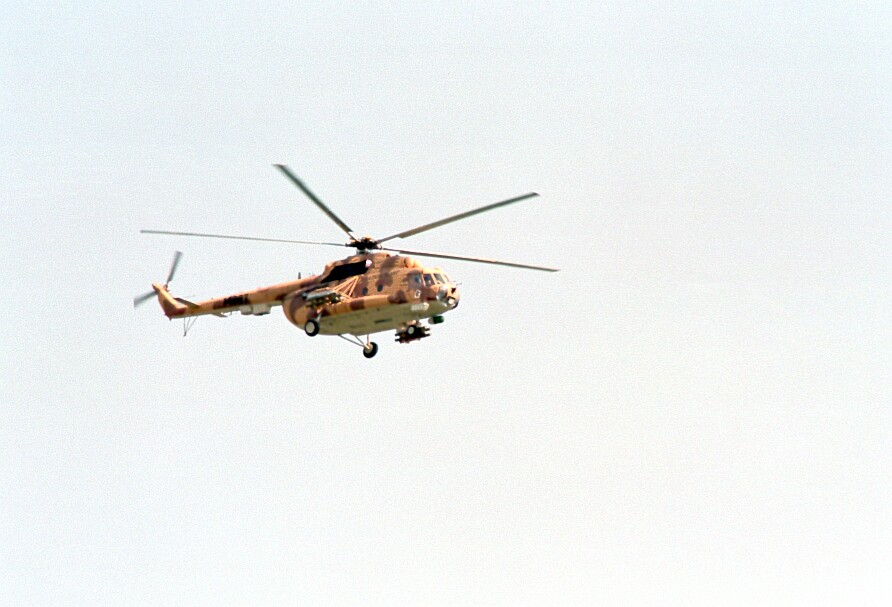
Mi-17 helicopters were deployed for the logistical support and evacuation of critically wounded soldiers to the Combined Military Hospitals.

In another incident, the convoy of Inspector-General Frontier Corps Major-General Tariq Khan was ambushed on 9 September 2009 at Nissarabad. Col. Nauman went back to the ambush site with a tank and a Quick Response Force to extricate the crew of a vehicle that was disabled by the militants fire. His tank received multiple hits by RPG-7s and his operator suffered a bullet injury. However, they extracted the stranded vehicle along with the soldiers. He was awarded by the government for his contribution to the operation.

== See also ==
- Bajaur Campaign
- 1961 Pakistani Bombing of Batmalai
- Terrorism in Pakistan
- War in North-West Pakistan
