= Mangla =

Town near Mangla Dam, Pakistan

Coordinates: 33.1167°N 73.6500°E

Mangla منگلا
- Town
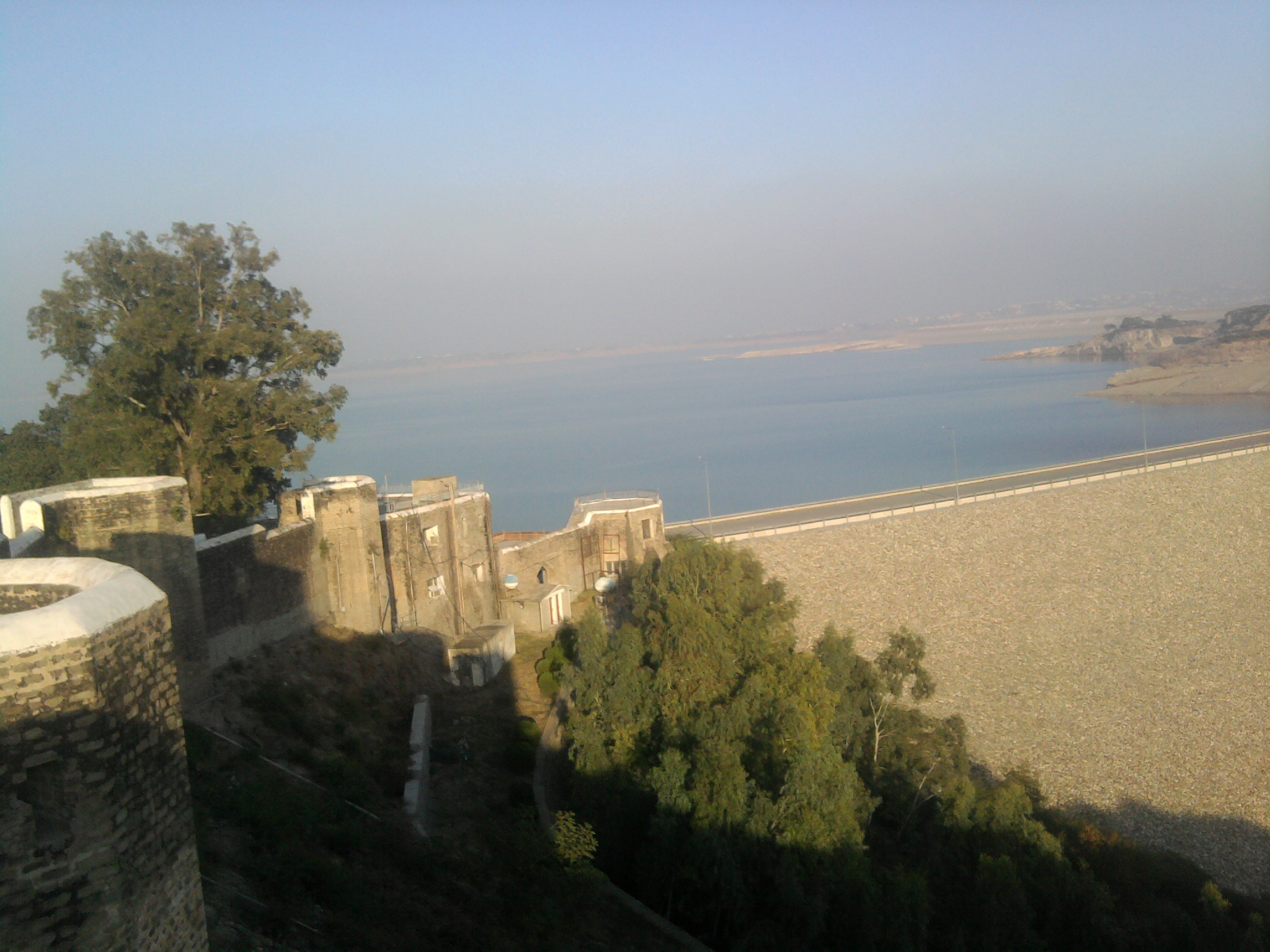
- Mangla Fort
- Etymology: Mangla Rani
- Interactive map of Mangla
- Country: Pakistan
- Territory: Azad Kashmir
- Division: Mirpur
- District: Mirpur

Languages
  - Official: Urdu (Note: Snedden (2013, p. 176): On p. 29, the census report states that Urdu is the official language of the government of Azad Kashmir, with Kashmiri, Pahari, Gojri, Punjabi, Kohistani, Pushto, and Sheena 'frequently spoken in Azad Kashmir'. Yet, when surveyed about their 'mother tongue', Azad Kashmiris' choices were limited to selecting from Pakistan's major languages: Urdu, Punjabi, Sindhi, Pushto, Balochi, Saraiki, and 'others'; not surprisingly, 2.18 million of Azad Kashmir's 2.97 million people chose 'others'.)
  - Spoken: Pothwari
- Time zone: Pakistan Standard Time

Mangla (Urdu: منگلا) is a town situated in District Mirpur within the region of Azad Kashmir. The village is located in the west of the foothills of Mangla's fort (which also derived its name from the same village). It is surrounded on three sides by the semicurvature of river Jhelum flowing North to South. It is bordered by Jhelum district and the right bank of the Mangla reservoir on the border of Azad Kashmir and Punjab province of Pakistan.

== Etymology ==
The town of Mangla was named after the 16th-century Gakhar Queen Mangla Rani.

== History ==
At the time of construction of the Mangla Dam, the villages of Sultanpure, Thill, Baral and Baruti across the river in Jhelum District were developed as residential colonies and offices for foreign workers and officials.

Prior to the construction of Mangla Dam, in March 1962, almost all the inhabitants of the ancient Mangla village moved to Mangla Hamlet, therefore this town represents Mangla in a true sense. Mangla is located 12 km (7.5 mi) from the city of Mirpur, at the mouth of the Mangla Dam. The dam reservoir has a perimeter of 400 km, and is a place of interest. It hosts the Mangla Power Station, which is the second largest in Pakistan.

== Mangla Fort ==
Mangla is the site of the historic Mangla Fort. The fort is situated on a high hill overlooking the Jhelum river, dividing the Mirpur and Jhelum districts. A part of Mangla fort was razed during the construction of the Mangla Dam, however, a large part remains and serves as a public recreation place.

== Mangla Cantonment ==
After the completion of Mangla Dam, most of the Baral and Sultanpure Thill area was taken over by the Pakistan Army and converted into a Cantonment whereas a small section within the compound walls of Pakistan Army's officers residences, known as Baral Colony, was allotted to WAPDA named as WAPDA Officers Colony.
