= Faiz Hameed =

29th Director-General of the Inter-Services Intelligence (Pakistan)

Lieutenant General Faiz Hameed HI (M)

Commander XXXI Corps
- In office 9 August 2022 – 3 December 2022
- Preceded by: Lt. Gen. Khalid Zia
- Succeeded by: Lt. Gen. Saqib Mahmood Malik

Commander XI Corps
- In office 20 November 2021 – 8 August 2022
- Preceded by: Lt. Gen. Nauman Mehmood
- Succeeded by: Lt. Gen. Sardar Hassan Azhar Hayat

29th Director-General of Inter-Services Intelligence
- In office 16 June 2019 – 19 November 2021
- President: Arif Alvi
- Prime Minister: Imran Khan
- Preceded by: Lt. Gen. Asim Munir
- Succeeded by: Lt. Gen. Nadeem Anjum

Adjutant General GHQ (Pakistan)
- In office April 2019 – June 2019

Director General CI-Wing of the ISI
- In office Jan 2017 – April 2019

GOC 16th Infantry Division Pano Akil
- In office June 2015 – Jan 2017
- Preceded by: Brigadier Shafqatullah

Personal details
- Born: 1965 ,Latifal, Punjab, Pakistan
- Education: Pakistan Command and Staff College; Pakistan Military Academy

Military service
- Allegiance: Pakistan
- Branch/service: Pakistan Army
- Years of service: 1987–2022
- Rank: Lieutenant General
- Unit: Baloch Regiment
- Commands: DG-ISI; DG Counterintelligence-ISI Wing; Commander XI Corps; Commander XXXI Corps; GOC 16th Infantry Division; AG General Headquarters
- Awards: Hilal-e-Imtiaz (Military)

Faiz Hameed HI(M) (Punjabi and Urdu: فیض حمید) is a retired military officer of the Pakistan Army who served as the 29th Director-General of Inter-Services Intelligence from 2019 to 2021. He was formerly commissioned in the Baloch Regiment having served as GOC of the 16th Infantry Division stationed in Pano Akil. He last served as Commander of the XXXI Corps before an early retirement on 10 December 2022. In August 2024, he was arrested and court-martialed by the Pakistan Army on charges of indulging in politics, violating the Official Secrets Act and abuse of authority. Hameed became the first DG-ISI in Pakistan's history to have been court-martialed. After a closed-door trial that lasted for almost 15 months, he was sentenced in December 2025 to 14 years of imprisonment.

== Early life and family ==
Faiz was born in Latifal village of Chakwal District, Punjab Province in 1965 in the and joined the Pakistan Military Academy in 1987. He graduated from Command and Staff College and was commissioned in the Baloch Regiment of the Pakistan Army. He has three brothers, Sikandar Hayat, Najaf Hameed and Khizar. His brother Sikandar Hayat died in 2016 in an accident while his brother Najaf Hameed is a land revenue officer in his hometown. Hameed's family belongs to Chakwal which is known for producing many Pakistani military commanders.

== Military career ==
He was commissioned in the Pakistan Army's Baloch Regiment. In the mid-2010s, he forged a relationship with future army chief Qamar Javed Bajwa while serving as a brigadier in the army's X Corps, based in Rawalpindi. He was then quickly promoted to Major General in February 2015 and served as General Officer Commanding (GOC) of the 16th Infantry Division at Pano Akil from June 2015 to January 2017. Once Bajwa became the army chief, in November 2016, he appointed Hameed as Director General-Counterintelligence Wing (DG-C) of Inter-Services Intelligence (ISI), in January 2017. Due to this meteoric rise, he was seen as Bajwa's trusted confidant and was sometimes even considered more influential than the Director-General of Inter-Services Intelligence (DG-ISI), Naveed Mukhtar.

He was appointed as the Adjutant General at the GHQ in Rawalpindi in April 2019 and was promoted as a Lieutenant General, obtaining his third star. He served as DG-ISI from June 2019 to 6 October 2021.

He also served as Corp Commander in Peshawar and Bahawalpur until his retirement.

== Inter-Services Intelligence career ==
He served as Director General-Counterintelligence Wing (DG-C) of Inter-Services Intelligence (ISI) from 2017 to 2019 as a Major General. As DG-C, Faiz was accused by the Pakistan Muslim League (N) (PML-N) for his alleged role in the ouster of Nawaz Sharif and bringing Imran Khan into power at the behest of General Qamar Javed Bajwa.

Later as Lieutenant General Hameed served as Director-General of Inter-Services Intelligence (DG-ISI) from June 2019 to 19 November 2021. He was the 29th DG-ISI. Hameed replaced Asim Munir who held the position for only eight months, compared to two years in practice.

Like previous DGs of the ISI, he is accused of maintaining close ties with the leaders of the Afghan Taliban. In September 2021, he visited Kabul just a month after the Taliban took control of the country and discussed the changes after US withdrawal.

=== Role during 2017 Fayzabad sit-in ===
As DG-C, Hameez reportedly mediated between Tehreek-e-Labbaik Pakistan protestors of the Fayzabad-sit in and the then PML-N government of Nawaz Sharif. His mediation was described as an action beyond his constitutional mandate due to which he faced severe criticism. He was accused of having engineered the three-week sit-in at the Fayzabad Interchange that paralyzed Islamabad and triggered violence at several places nationwide. His role in Fayzabad was also criticized by the Supreme Court in one of its verdicts. As a result of the Faizabad protest, the PML-N government had to fire its law minister Zahid Hamid. It is widely believed that the demonstration aggravated the unpopularity of the PML-N government and resulted in its defeat during the 2018 general elections.In 2024 an enquiry commission cleared Hameed of any wrongdoing.

=== Alleged political engineering in 2018 general election ===
The PML-N leadership alleges that the 2018 Pakistani general election was heavily engineered in favor of Imran Khan's Pakistan Tehreek-e-Insaf (PTI). PML-N and other political parties claimed that military establishment led by then army chief General Qamar Javed Bajwa, through political engineering of Hameed ensured the victory for PTI over PML-N. Nawaz Sharif has openly accused Hameed for his political downfall. Hameed was alleged to have threatened many lawmakers to switch sides and defect from PML-N and other political parties to PTI. Parties like Pakistan Muslim League (Q), Muttahida Qaumi Movement, Grand Democratic Alliance and Balochistan Awami Party provided its support to PTI which ultimately brought Imran Khan's to power in 2018.

=== Mediation in Doha talks ===
Pakistan played a role of a mediator and a facilitator between United States and the Taliban to reach the Doha Agreement. Pakistan used its diplomatic channels to promote communication and peacemaking between the two sides. In his capacity as DG-ISI, Faiz played a key role in shaping and executing Pakistan’s Afghan policy during Doha talks. It was Hameed along with Pakistan's special envoy Muhammad Sadiq who were central figures in helping patch together the Doha talks between the US and the Taliban. Hameed was also instrumental in engaging with the Taliban both in Doha and in Afghanistan.

=== Activities in Kabul following Taliban victory ===
During his tenure as DG-ISI, he visited Kabul only a couple of weeks after the Afghan capital fell to the Taliban. When a reporter asked Hameed about what would happen now that the Taliban controlled Afghanistan, Hameed smiled, and famously replied: "Don't worry, everything will be okay."

Hameed’s visit was pivotal in mitigating internal power rivalry among various Taliban factions. Hameed reportedly mediated among Taliban factions in their process of appointments for key portfolios such as the head of the state or head of the government, choosing Mullah Hasan Akhund instead of Mullah Abdul Ghani Baradar while ensuring bulk of ministerial positions for Haqqanis.

=== Role in India-Pakistan ceasefire agreement ===
Reportedly, as part of backdoor diplomacy between India and Pakistan, Hameed in his role as DG-ISI held several rounds of talks with Indian National Security Advisor Ajit Doval between 2020 and 2021 which led to the renewed pledge of an India-Pakistan ceasefire on the Line of Control in 2021.

=== Allegations of judicial manipulation ===
In 2018, the Islamabad High Court's (IHC) dismissed judge, Shaukat Aziz Siddiqui, who accused Hameed of manipulating judicial proceedings in the Panama Papers case involving former prime minister Nawaz Sharif. Siddiqui claimed that Faiz, who was serving as the DG-C of ISI at the time, sought a bench of his preference to hear appeals related to Nawaz Sharif and his family. Various PML-N leaders have repeatedly levelled allegations against Hameed for judicial manipulation of the Panama Papers case that led to the removal of Nawaz Sharif as prime minister in 2017. Hameed's judicial manipulation is alleged to be behind Sharif's subsequent imprisonment from 2018 to 2019 and later his self-exile in London from 2019 to 2023.

On January 22, 2024, a five-member larger bench of the Supreme Court, led by Chief Justice Qazi Faez Isa, addressed the sacked judge's petition. Notably, the petition was not entertained during the tenures of three former chief justices.

Prior to the hearing, Hameed submitted his responses through Khawaja Haris Ahmad. In defense, the he refuted the claims made by the former IHC judge, labeling them as "absolutely false, concocted, and based on an afterthought." Faiz clarified that the constitution of benches for hearing appeals fell under the purview of the IHC chief justice, not the petitioner, who was then the senior puisne judge.

=== 2021 controversy over appointment of the next DG-ISI ===
Hameed was also at the center of a controversy over the appointment of his successor as DG-ISI in late 2021. Appointment for a new DG-ISI came to the surface in Pakistani media in the October 2021 which triggered constitutional rift between civilian and military leadership over the appointment of Hameed's successor. It was reported in the media circles that then prime minister Imran Khan wanted to retain Hameed as DG-ISI. On 6 October 2021, the Inter-Services Public Relations (ISPR), Pakistan military's media affairs wing announced the replacement of Hameed with Nadeem Anjum. After two days, it became apparent on social media that the federal government had yet to issue any formal notification for the appointment of the new DG-ISI. Rumors became more substantiated when Hameed attended the National Security Committee meeting instead of the expected new DG-ISI.

On 13 October 2021, information minister Fawad Chaudhry informed media that the process of appointing a new DG-ISI was in progress, and that the selection is prime minister Imran Khan's prerogative. He also noted that the army chief and the prime minister agreed on following correct procedures of appointment according to the constitution.

Malik Aamir Dogar, the Special Assistant to the Prime Minister on Political Affairs, later said on a talk show that Imran Khan wanted Hameed to continue as DG-ISI for some more months after taking into consideration Hameed's expertise on the situation in Afghanistan. Dogar further stated that during the cabinet meeting, the prime minister stressed that if the army is a respected institution then the PM Office is also a respected one.

=== Allegations of attacks on journalists and manipulation of media ===
There are broader accusations that, under Hameed’s leadership (or at least under his influence), the ISI/intelligence establishment has contributed to a climate of fear among journalists. For instance, Bilawal Bhutto Zardari of Pakistan People's Party (PPP) said he would write to Hameed about how his institution was being "defamed" through attacks on journalists. There are also freedom-of-press concerns: a report by Freedom Network documented many cases (May 2023–March 2024) of violence, legal harassment, and threats against journalists. Absar Alam, then chairman of Pakistan Electronic Media Regulatory Authority (PEMRA), submitted an affidavit claiming that Hameed "exerted pressure" on media regulators during the Faizabad sit-in. Alam also alleged that Hameed advocated for banning certain media figures: that he "pushed for action" against Najam Sethi and called for a complete ban on Hussain Haqqani. As per an audio leaked by Alam, Faiz can be heard pressurizing Alam to grant licenses to his favourite TV channels. Later, Alam was shot and critically injured during jogging in a public park in Islamabad. Alam alleged Hameed master minded this attack to coerce him to accept his illegal orders.

In 2018, it was reported that Pakistan's largest private news channel Geo News was taken off-air due to pressure by Hameed as it was being critical of him and the PTI government of Imran Khan.

Journalist Asad Toor was brutally attacked by masked men in his home in 2021, and while Toor has publicly linked the attack to the ISI and Hameed, there is no definitive public evidence that Hameed ordered the attack against Toor. Journalist Hamid Mir in 2021 accused Hameed of threatening him and fellow media persons for his criticism of the military's support to the PTI and Imran Khan and Hameed's political activities against Imran Khan's political rivals PML-N and PPP. Hamid Mir was taken off-air by Geo News and his program Capital Talk was blocked from broadcast during Hameed's tenure.

=== Role in Al-Qadir Trust and alleged favors to Bahria Town ===
Property tycoon Malik Riaz had assets worth £190 million seized by the National Crime Agency (NCA) of the United Kingdom during the PTI government. The assets would be transferred to the Pakistani government, according to the NCA. The agreement with the real estate tycoon was regarded as a civil matter and did not indicate guilt.

On 3 December 2019, then prime minister Imran Khan received approval from his cabinet for settlement with the UK crime agency without revealing specifics of the accord. According to the arrangement, the money would be presented to the Supreme Court on Malik Riaz's behalf. This amount was intended for the government of Pakistan but was instead deposited into a Supreme Court account designated for fines imposed on Bahria Town, Malik Riaz's real estate company, as part of a separate land acquisition case.

In the weeks that followed the decision, Islamabad saw the founding of the Al-Qadir Trust. Members of the trust have been named as PTI leaders Zulfi Bukhari, Babar Awan, Bushra Bibi, and her close friend Farah Khan. Malik Riaz allegedly gave up the land for the construction of an educational institution in exchange for legal protection for the monies he had.

Former federal minister and close aide of Imran Khan, Faisal Vawda has publicly accused Hameed of being the “architect, mastermind, and biggest beneficiary” of the alleged scam. According to The Friday Times, there are claims that on Hameed’s behest, Malik Riaz supported Imran Khan’s projects (or was given “undue favors”) — i.e., a quid-pro-quo.Two retired brigadiers and close subordinates working under Hameed—Brigadier Naeem Fakhar and Brigadier Ghaffaar, both hailing from Hameed's hometown Chakwal—reportedly turned approvers (state witnesses) in a graft case against Hameed. According to The Print, Naeem Fakhar is “allegedly” the focal person for a “Theme Park” project linked to Malik Riaz / Bahria Town — suggesting a financial / infrastructure tie between Hameed’s inner circle and Riaz. Brigadier Ghaffaar is linked to development projects (roads, hospitals) in Hameed’s village (Latifal, Chakwal), which are allegedly funded by Bahria Town.

=== Top City Scandal and court martial ===
Hameed faced potential court-martial following an investigation into his alleged misconduct in the Top City Case. The controversy erupted in 2023 when Moeez Ahmed Khan, the owner of the housing scheme, petitioned Chief Justice Qazi Faez Isa’s bench, alleging a severe breach of legal conduct on the part of Hameed when he was DG-ISI. Khan contended that in May 2017, Rangers and ISI agents conducted an unauthorized raid on the Top City office and the residence of Kunwar Khan, a key figure associated with the scheme. According to the petition, the security forces seized valuable items including 400 tola of gold, diamonds, and cash, claiming they were part of a terrorism investigation.

Kunwar Khan accused Hameed of malicious prosecution and alleged that retired ISI brigadiers Naeem Fakhar and Ghaffar exerted undue pressure on him to pay Rs. 4 crores in cash and support a private television network. The petition also highlights that several former ISI officials were allegedly involved in an unlawful takeover of the Top City Housing Society.

In response to these allegations, the Supreme Court directed a thorough investigation to the Ministry of Defence. In 2024, complying with the orders of the Supreme Court, the military formed a court of inquiry in April 2024 to investigate allegations of misuse of authority against Hameed in the Top City case. Consequent to which, appropriate disciplinary action was initiated against Faiz, under provisions of the Pakistan Army Act, 1952 including instances of post retirement violations of the act. On 12 August 2024, the ISPR said that Hameed had been taken into military custody and the process for his court martial had been initiated in connection with the Top City case. He was taken into custody by the Pakistan Army in August 2024 against four charges, including engaging in political activities, violating the Official Secrets Act in a manner "detrimental to the safety and interest of the state", misuse of authority and government resources, and causing wrongful loss to individuals. Hameed became the first DG-ISI in the history of Pakistan to have been court-martialed by the Pakistani military. The arrest was noted as unusual for Pakistan, a country in which arrests of military personnel, whether current or former, are rare.

On 15 August, the ISPR announced that further investigations of certain retired officers and their accomplices for fomenting instability at the behest of and in collusion with vested political interests were continuing and three retired officers were also taken into military custody for their actions prejudicial to military discipline. On 10 December, Hameed was indicted by a court-martial on charges of indulging in politics, violating the Official Secrets Act and abuse of authority.

The trial and legal proceedings of Hameed's court martial lasted for almost 15 months under the adjutant general branch of the Pakistan Army, after which he was sentenced on 11 December 2025 to fourteen years of rigorous imprisonment. Hameed's court martial is viewed as part of a larger eradication of allies of former prime minister Imran Khan, who had selected Hameed as DG-ISI. Since the case was held behind closed doors in a military court, details of the proceedings are not publicly available.

== Effective dates of promotion ==
Insignia	Rank	Date
	Lieutenant General	April 2019
	Major General	Feb 2015
	Brigadier	2009 (Direct promotion from Lt. Col.)
	Colonel	-
	Lieutenant Colonel	2003
	Major	1996
	Captain	1991
	Lieutenant	1988
	Second Lieutenant	1987

== Awards and decorations ==

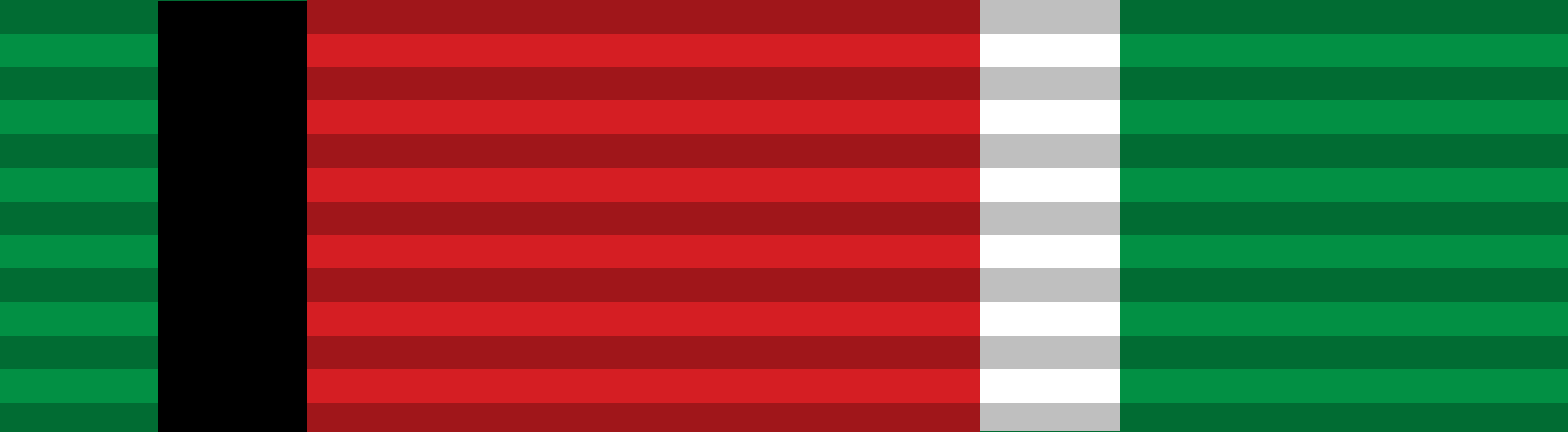

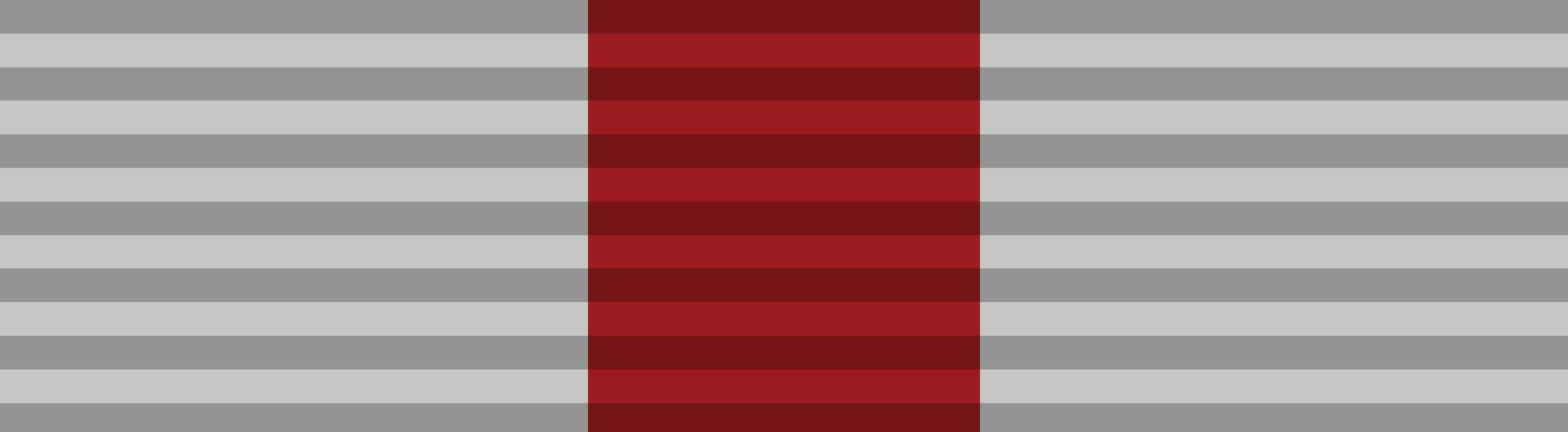

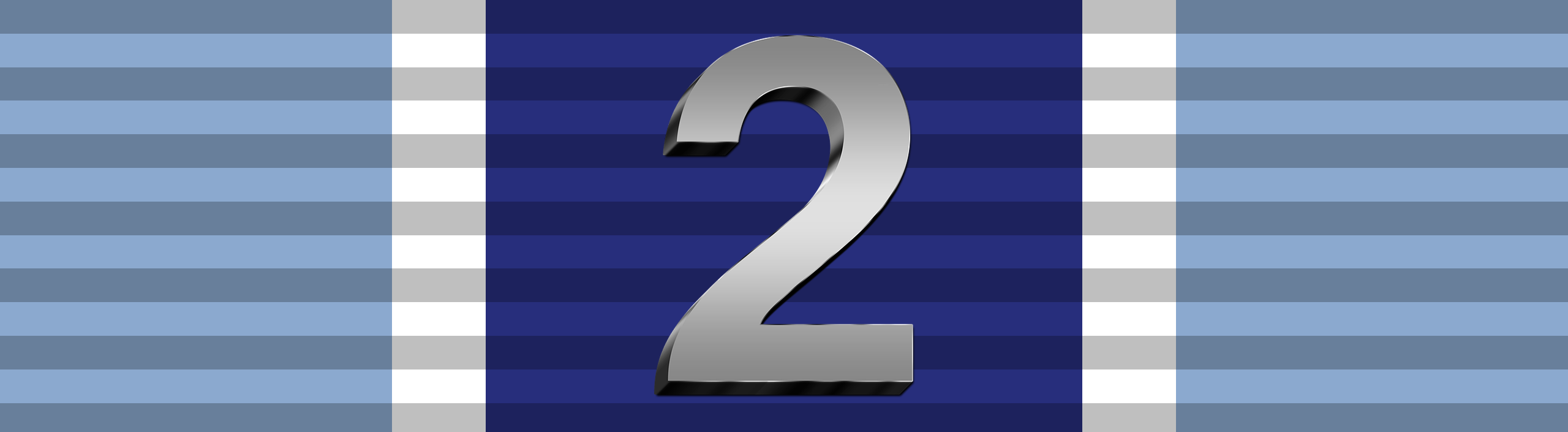

Hilal-e-Imtiaz (Military) (Crescent of Excellence) (2018)		Tamgha-e-Diffa (General Service Medal) Siachen Glacier Clasp	
Tamgha-e-Baqa (Nuclear Test Medal) 1998	Tamgha-e-Istaqlal Pakistan (Escalation with India Medal) 2002	Tamgha-e-Azm (Medal of Conviction) (2018)	10 Years Service Medal
20 Years Service Medal	30 Years Service Medal	35 Years Service Medal	Jamhuriat Tamgha (Democracy Medal) 1988
Qarardad-e-Pakistan Tamgha (Resolution Day Golden Jubilee Medal) 1990	Tamgha-e-Salgirah Pakistan (Independence Day Golden Jubilee Medal) 1997	Command & Staff College Quetta Student's Medal	United Nations UNMIK Medal (2 Deployments)

=== Foreign decorations ===
Foreign Awards
United Nations	UNMIK (Kosovo) Medal

Military offices
Preceded by Asim Munir	Director General of the Inter-Services Intelligence	Succeeded by Nadeem Anjum
