= Haleji Sharif =

Dargah Haleji Shareef
- Village
- Location within Pakistan
- Coordinates: 27°47′N 69°08′E
- Country: Pakistan
- Province: Sindh

Government
  - UC Nazim: Molvi Wahbullah Indhar Halejivi

Area
  - Total: 2 km^{2} (0.77 sq mi)

Population
  - Total: 4,500
- Time zone: UTC+5 (PST)

Haleji Sharif is a village in Pano Aqil taluka, Sukkur district in Sindh, Pakistan. It is about 50 kilometres (31 mi) from Sukkur City and 10 kilometres (6.2 mi) from Pano Aqil, near Pano Aqil Cantonment, on National Highway N5.
