= XXXI Corps (Pakistan) =

Pakistan Army's field maneuver strike corps

- Badge of XXXI Corps
- Active: 1986; 40 years ago
- Country: Pakistan
- Branch: Pakistan Army
- Type: XXX Corps
- Role: Maneuver/Deployment oversight.
- Size: 45,000 approximately (Though this may vary as units are rotated)
- Garrison/HQ: Bahawalpur Cantonment, Punjab, Pakistan
- Nickname: Bahawalpur Corps
- Colors Identification: Red and white
- Anniversaries: 1986
- Decorations: Military Decorations of Pakistan military

Commanders
- Commander: Lt Gen Muhammad Aqeel
- Notable commanders: Gen. Shamim Alam; Lt-Gen. Mohammad Shafiq; Lt-Gen. Haroon Aslam; Lt-Gen. Muzaffar Hussain Usmani; Lt-Gen. Faiz Hameed

Insignia
- Flag

The XXXI Corps is a field corps of the Pakistan Army, currently stationed in Bahawalpur, Punjab in Pakistan.

It is currently commanded by Lt-Gen. Muhammad Aqeel as of 2025.

== History ==
The XXXI Corps was formed and raised as part of the major reorganization of the Pakistani military in 1985– it was one of the three corps that were formed to address the security in the country. The XXXI Corps took over the area of responsibility of southern region of Punjab from the II Corps, which is more well suited for forestry warfare techniques. It was initially headquartered in Pano Akil but later moved to Bahawalpur Cantonment as the corps headquarter. Together with the V Corps in Sindh, the XXXI Corps is responsible for the maneuvering combat readiness in the southern Punjab's desert zone.

In 2023, 35th Infantry Division attached to the XXXI Corps equipped with VCC-2 APCs were reportedly be taking part in anti-bandit operations near Bahawalpur alongside Punjab Police, based on social media and news reports. The units from the 35th were then rotated with fresh replacements consisting of VCC-1 APCs. The police were also equipped with locally made M113A1/A2 APCs.

== Structure ==
Its present order of battle is as follows:

Structure of XXXI Corps
Corps	Corps HQ	Corps Commander	Assigned Units	Unit HQ
XXXI Corps	Bahawalpur	Lt. Gen Muhammad Aqeel	26th Mechanized Division	Bahawalpur
XXXI Corps	Bahawalpur	Lt. Gen Muhammad Aqeel	35th Infantry Division	Bahawalpur
XXXI Corps	Bahawalpur	Lt. Gen Muhammad Aqeel	14th Infantry Division	Okara
XXXI Corps	Bahawalpur	Lt. Gen Muhammad Aqeel	101st Independent Infantry Brigade	U/I Location
XXXI Corps	Bahawalpur	Lt. Gen Muhammad Aqeel	14th Independent Armored Brigade	Bahawalpur
XXXI Corps	Bahawalpur	Lt. Gen Muhammad Aqeel	Independent Artillery Brigade	U/I Location
XXXI Corps	Bahawalpur	Lt. Gen Muhammad Aqeel	Independent Engineering Brigade	U/I Location
XXXI Corps	Bahawalpur	Lt. Gen Muhammad Aqeel	Independent Signal Brigade	U/I Location

|style="background:#e6e6aa;"|Commander Station Headquarters

|style="background:#e6e6aa". |Station Headquarters Bahawalpur

== List of Commanders XXXI Corps ==
Corps Commander	Start date	End date
Lt Gen Muhammad Aqeel	2 May 2025	Incumbent
Lt Gen Saqib Mahmood Malik	4 December 2022	2 May 2025
Lt Gen Faiz Hameed	9th Aug 2022	3 December 2022
Lt Gen Khalid Zia	Nov 2020	8 August 2022
Lt Gen Syed Muhammad Adnan	April 2019	Nov 2020
Lt Gen Javed Mehmood Bukhari	August 2018	April 2019
Lt Gen Sher Afgun	December 2016	August 2018
Lt Gen Javed Iqbal Ramday	April 2015	December 2016
Lt Gen Javed Iqbal	December 2013	April 2015
Lt Gen Zubair Mahmood Hayat	January 2013	December 2013
Lt Gen Muhammad Haroon Aslam	March 2011	January 2013
Lt Gen Naeem Khalid Lodhi	October 2009	March 2011
Lt Gen Muhammad Yousaf	October 2008	October 2009
Lt Gen Raza Mohammad Khan	April 2007	October 2008
Lt Gen Imtiaz Hussain	May 2005	April 2007
Lt Gen Syed Parwez Shahid	September 2003	May 2005
Lt Gen Shahid Hamid	October 2001	September 2003
Lt Gen Munir Hafiez	August 2000	October 2001
Lt Gen Tahir Ali Qureshi	October 1998	August 2000
Lt Gen Muzaffar Hussain Usmani	May 1997	October 1998
Lt Gen Khalid Nawaz Malik	January 1996	May 1997
Lt Gen Iftikhar Ali Khan	June 1993	January 1996
Lt Gen Muhammad Akram Khan	August 1991	May 1993
Lt Gen Shamim Alam Khan	April 1991	August 1991
Lt Gen Mohammad Shafiq	March 1988	April 1991
