= Judge Advocate General Branch (Pakistan) =

Pakistan Army's staff corps for legal services

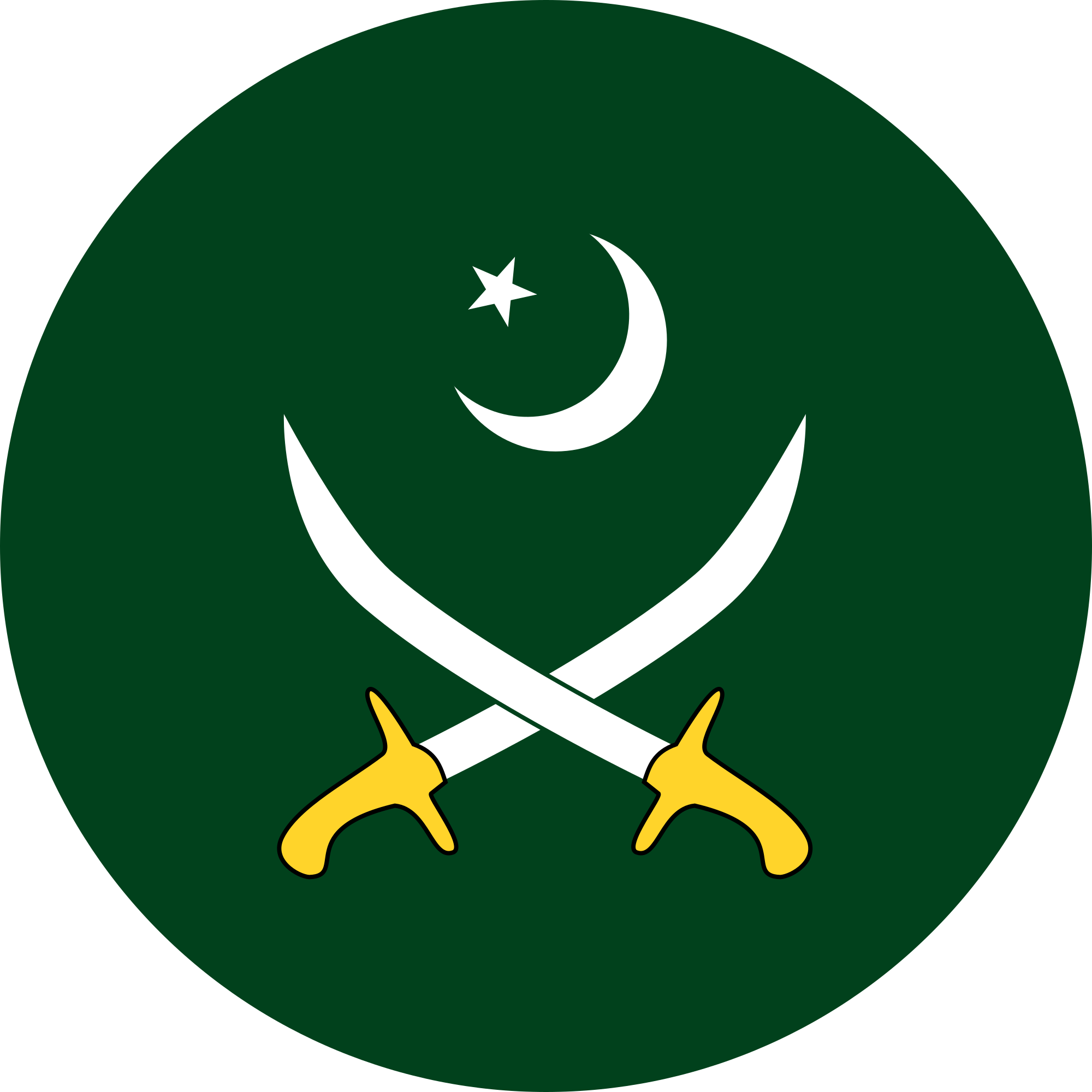
- Badge of Pakistan Army
- Active: 1960; 66 years ago
- Country: Pakistan
- Branch: Pakistan Army
- Type: Combined and combat support service
- Role: Administrative and staffing oversight of military law and courts.
- Size: Varies
- HQ/Garrison: Army GHQ in Rawalpindi, Punjab, Pakistan
- Nickname: JAG
- Colors Identification: White and Green
- Anniversaries: 1959
- Engagements: Military history of Pakistan
- Decorations: Military Decorations of Pakistan military

Commanders
- Judge Advocate General: Maj-Gen. Ghulam Jaffar
- Notable commanders: Gen. Zia-ul-Haq; Gen. Rahimuddin Khan

Insignia
- War Flag

The Judge Advocate General Branch is a military administrative and the combined staff service branch of the Pakistan Army.

The Judge Advocate General Branch is an army's branch, but it has provided the legal services and justice to all branches of the Pakistani military and processes the proceedings of the field general courts-martial on occasions.

== Overview ==
In 1959, the Pakistan Air Force was the first military service that established the Judge Advocate General Department in a response to a need of introducing specialization in the legal field. In fact, all members of the JAG are law graduates but not necessarily a member of the Pakistan Bar Council. Since 1960, each branch of the Pakistani military now has its own JAG department but functions similarly to that of the army's JAG branch.

The JAG provides consultation to the Chiefs of Staff in the Pakistani military on legal matters relating to the military law.

Since the 2015, the General Lawfare Directorate (GLD) of the army has now oversees the legal proceedings of the Judge Advocate General at all levels of command– which is usually head by an active-duty major-general as its director. From 1947–2014, the army JAG was proceeding of its general court-martial which was overseen by the Brigadier. Services of the army's JAG includes the military judges, warrant officers, paralegal noncommissioned officers and junior enlisted personnel, and other civilian employees.

In spite of the series of lawsuits filed against the army's JAG at the Supreme Court of Pakistan in 2008–10, the military justices and punishments sentenced by the army's JAG is barred from challenging its proceedings in the civilian courts— a clause that protected in the Constitution of Pakistan. The Director-General of the General Lawfare Directorate works under the Chief of General Staff but report directly to the Chief of Army Staff at the Army GHQ in Rawalpindi, Punjab in Pakistan.

== Court-martialed officers of the Pakistan Armed Forces ==
- Lt. Gen. Faiz Hameed - Pakistan Army
- Pilot officer Anwar Peerzada - Pakistan Air Force
- Lt-General Javed Iqbal - Pakistan Army
- Major-General Zahirul Islam Abbasi - Pakistan Army
- Major-General Tajammul Hussain Malik - Pakistan Army
- Brigadier Mustansir Billah - Pakistan Army
- Lieutenant-Colonel Raja Nadir Pervez - Pakistan Army
- Colonel Shahid Bashir - Pakistan Army
- Squadron Leader Nadeem Ahmad Shah- Pakistan Air Force
- Major (R) Adil Raja - Pakistan Army
- Captain (R) Haider Raza Mehdi - Pakistan Army

== See also ==
- Judge advocate general
- General Muhammad Zia-ul-Haq - notable JAG judge who headed numerous courts-martial of Pakistani army officers
