= Sir Syed College =

Sir Syed College are colleges named after Sir Syed Ahmad Khan. They may refer to:

- Sir Syed College (Taliparamba) in Kerala, India.
- Sir Syed Government Girls College in Karachi, Sindh, Pakistan.
- F. G. Sir Syed College in Rawalpindi, Punjab, Pakistan
