= Javed Iqbal (general) =

Pakistani army general

Commander of XXXI Corps, Bahawalpur
- In office 23 December 2013 – 10 April 2015
- Preceded by: Zubair Hayat
- Succeeded by: Javed Iqbal Ramday

Adjutant General of Pakistan Army
- In office 29 April 2011 – 23 December 2013
- Preceded by: Nadeem Taj
- Succeeded by: Zamirul Hassan

Director General Military Operations

Military service
- Branch/service: Pakistan Army
- Rank: Lieutenant General

Javed Iqbal is a retired Pakistani general who served as Director General Military Operations, Adjutant-General at the General Headquarters, and commander of XXXI Corps in Bahawalpur. In May 2019, he was convicted by a Field General Court Martial on charges described by the military as “espionage/leakage of sensitive information to foreign agencies prejudicial to the national security” and was sentenced to 14 years' rigorous imprisonment. His sentence was later reduced, and he was released from prison in December 2022 while continuing to challenge the conviction in court.

== Military career ==
Iqbal served as Director General Military Operations until April 2011. On 15 April 2011, he was promoted to the rank of lieutenant general and assigned to take over as Adjutant-General at the GHQ after the retirement of Nadeem Taj on 29 April.

On 23 December 2013, he was appointed as commander of XXXI Corps in Bahawalpur. He remained in that post until April 2015, when Javed Iqbal Ramday was appointed to replace him upon his retirement.

He was one of the few three-star generals to have held the key appointments of director-general of military operations, adjutant-general and corps commander. He had also led the military's internal probe into the 2011 Abbottabad raid in which Osama bin Laden was killed.

== Court martial ==
In February 2019, Inter-Services Public Relations confirmed that two senior retired military officers had been taken into custody on charges of espionage and were facing court martial. On 30 May 2019, the military announced that Chief of Army Staff Qamar Javed Bajwa had endorsed the punishment awarded by separate Field General Courts Martial to three convicts, including Javed Iqbal, who was sentenced to 14 years' rigorous imprisonment.

In January 2022, defence authorities told the Lahore High Court Rawalpindi bench that he had been indicted on six charges for espionage under the Pakistan Army Act and that his sentence had been reduced by seven years by the Army Court of Appeals in May 2021.

In January 2023, he released from Rawalpindi's Adiala Jail on 29 December 2022 after the military leadership reviewed his case and completed the remainder of his sentence. He still continued to pursue an appeal in the Lahore High Court seeking to have his conviction set aside.
