= Farrukh Mahal =

- فرخ محل
- Interactive map of the Farrukh Mahal area
- Alternative names: Farrukh Palace

General information
- Type: Palace
- Architectural style: Indo-Saracenic
- Location: Bahawalpur, Punjab, Pakistan
- Coordinates: 29.396°N 71.702°E
- Current tenants: Pakistan Army
- Construction started: 1904
- Completed: 1911
- Client: Nawab Muhammad Bahawal Khan V

Technical details
- Material: Red brick
- Floor count: 2

Farrukh Mahal is a red-brick Indo-Saracenic residence built in the early twentieth century inside the walled Bahawalgarh Palace Complex at Bahawalpur in Southern Punjab, Pakistan. The ensemble of three companion palaces was commissioned by Nawab Muhammad Bahawal Khan V in 1904 during a period of prosperity for the princely state. Together with neighbouring Darbar Mahal and Nishat Mahal, the property was leased to the Pakistan Army in 1966 and today forms part of the restricted Bahawalpur Cantonment, remaining closed to the general public.

== History ==
Farrukh Palace was conceived as the domestic wing of a triad of royal buildings that replaced an earlier timber fortification on the same site. Ground breaking followed Nawab Bahawal Khan V's approval of plans on 19 May 1904 and structural work was largely complete by 1907, though interior fittings continued until 1911. Unlike the ceremonial Darbar Mahal, Farrukh functioned primarily as private apartments for the ruler's household and was therefore designed on a more intimate scale. After the accession of Bahawalpur to Pakistan in October 1947, the complex briefly accommodated provincial offices, but escalating maintenance costs and a family dispute over inheritance led the Abbasi heirs to lease the palaces to the federal government on a ninety-nine-year term in 1966. Since then the building has served as part of the headquarters of the Thirty Fifth Infantry Division, with access limited to army guests and occasional scholars.

== Architecture ==
Although less flamboyant than Darbar Mahal, Farrukh Palace mirrors its neighbour's eclectic fusion of styles while exhibiting subtler domestic detailing. Set on a square podium, the two-storey core is arranged around an octagonal central hall flanked by single-height corner rooms that open onto recessed terraces behind a continuous veranda. The façades employ red brick relieved by white stucco bands and are articulated by multi-foiled arches whose spandrels retain traces of fresco painting. Corinthian balustrades, pedimented gables and balustered parapets introduce Victorian idioms, yet these European devices coexist with Sikh-period jharoka balconies and Mughal chattri kiosks to create a characteristically hybrid effect. The palace once overlooked formal lawns aligned on a marble fountain that linked the three palaces with the complex mosque and baradari, emphasising axial planning favoured by late Victorian palace architecture in the subcontinent. Interior surfaces were originally decorated with lacquered timber ceilings and floral frescoes, most of which were over-painted during army refurbishments carried out in 2004 and again in 2007.
