= Pakistan Army (Amendment) Act, 2020 =

Law in Pakistan

Parliament of Pakistan
- Passed by: Senate of Pakistan
- Passed: 7 January 2020
- Introduced by: Senator Walid Iqbal

Pakistan Army (Amendment) Act, 2020 is a law that amends the Pakistan Army Act, 1952. It provides a measure to President of Pakistan acting on advice of Prime Minister of Pakistan to extend the tenure of Chief of Army Staff (COAS) by three years. The amendment also bars the act of the extension of tenure from being challenged in any court. The Act sets an upper age limit of 64 years for COAS.

== Background ==
On 19 August 2019, Pakistani prime minister Imran Khan announced that he had extended the tenure of Chief of Army Staff, Qamar Javed Bajwa for another three years. His original term was supposed to end on 29 November 2019, on which date Bajwa would have been retired sans this extension.

Soon after the extension announcement, a petition was filed with the Supreme Court of Pakistan (SCP) requesting the court to look into the matter as the petitioner believed that the Government of Pakistan did not follow proper procedures outlined in law and the Constitution of Pakistan.

On 28 November 2019, Just one day before Bajwa's potential retirement, a three-member Supreme Court bench, headed by then Chief Justice of Pakistan, Asif Saeed Khosa with justices Mansoor Ali Shah and Mazhar Alam Miankhel, issued a short order nullifying the government's extension notification while temporarily extending Bajwa's tenure for six months. The court ordered the government to put the matter of extension into the law in under six months sans which Bajwa would stand retired as of 29 November 2019. This was first time in the history of Pakistan that a court questioned the extension of an Army Chief. On 16 December 2019, the court issued a detailed judgement.

On 26 December 2019, the Government of Pakistan filed a review petition in the Supreme Court against the 16 December judgement and requested composition of a larger bench to hear the review petition. This gave an indication that the government might not be looking into complying with the original order until the review petition was decided.
