= Nishat Mahal =

- نشاط محل
- Interactive map of the Nishat Mahal area

General information
- Architectural style: Indo-Saracenic and Victorian eclectic
- Location: Bahawalpur, Punjab, Pakistan
- Coordinates: 29.397682°N 71.70129°E
- Current tenants: Pakistan Army
- Groundbreaking: 1905
- Completed: 1911

Technical details
- Material: Brick, stucco and marble
- Floor count: 2

Nishat Mahal is an early twentieth-century palace in Bahawalpur, Punjab, Pakistan. It was built between 1905 and 1911 for Nawab Muhammad Bahawal Khan V inside the walled Bahawalgarh Palace Complex. The residence, together with the adjacent Darbar Mahal and Farrukh Palace, has been under a long-term lease to the Pakistan Army since 1966 and therefore stands within the restricted Bahawalpur Cantonment.

== History ==
Nawab Bahawal Khan V approved plans for a trio of companion palaces on 19 May 1904; Nishat Mahal was conceived as the principal domestic wing of this ensemble. Foundation work began in 1905 and the palace was fully built by 1911, using revenues from the state treasury during a period of considerable prosperity for Bahawalpur. After the state acceded to Pakistan in October 1947, the complex accommodated various provincial offices until financial pressures prompted the Abbasi heirs to lease it to the federal government.

In 1966, control passed formally to the Pakistan Army's Thirty-Fifth Infantry Division, a transfer that closed Nishat Mahal to public access, although limited ceremonial visits are occasionally sanctioned.

== Architecture ==
Set on a raised square podium, the palace follows a central hall plan in which the principal chambers are octagonal and rise two storeys, while corner rooms remain single height, creating first-floor terraces recessed behind a continuous veranda. The façades employ red brick relieved by white stucco bands and are organised into geometric panels pierced by multi-foiled arches whose spandrels carry fine stucco tracery. Corinthian balustrades, fret-worked jali screens and balustered parapets evoke Victorian idioms, yet these European devices coexist with Sikh-period window compositions and Mughal chattris, producing a characteristically hybrid effect. A British-inspired marble fountain fronts the triple-arched entrance, aligning with formal lawns that once linked Nishat Mahal to the complex's baradari and mosque.

Interior surfaces retain vestiges of fresco painting and lacquered timber ceilings, although many panels were over-painted during army restorations in 2004 and 2007.
