= Latifal =

Latifal لطیفال
- Town and Villages
- Location in Pakistan
- Coordinates: 33°9′N 72°50′E
- Country: Pakistan
- Region: Punjab
- District: Chakwal District
- Tehsil: Chakwal
- Time zone: UTC+5 (PST)
- General Post Office: 48800
- Area code: 0543
- Website: Chakwal Police TMA Chakwal Local News Paper

Latifal is a village in Chakwal District, Punjab, Pakistan. It is north of Sikriala and Mangwal, north-east of Dhudial, around 20 km north of Chakwal, and about 70 km south of Islamabad. Latifal lies just below the southern border of District Rawalpindi. The population of Latifal was about 1,800 in 2007.

== Geography ==
Latifal is about 41 kilometres from Chakwal District. There are several ethnic groups in this village. It is home to at least two mosques. Bail karah jalsa is popular amongst elder people, and cricket amongst younger people.

== Education ==
Latifal has at least two schools:

- Government Girls Elementary School Latifal (female only)
- Government Primary School Latifal (male only)

== Notable persons ==
- Faiz Hameed - Former spy-chief and Director General Inter-Services Intelligence was born in Latifal. Faiz owns a large farm house at the outskirts of Latifal village where he lives after his retirement from Pakistan Army.
