= Darbar Mahal =

Darbar Mahal دربار محل
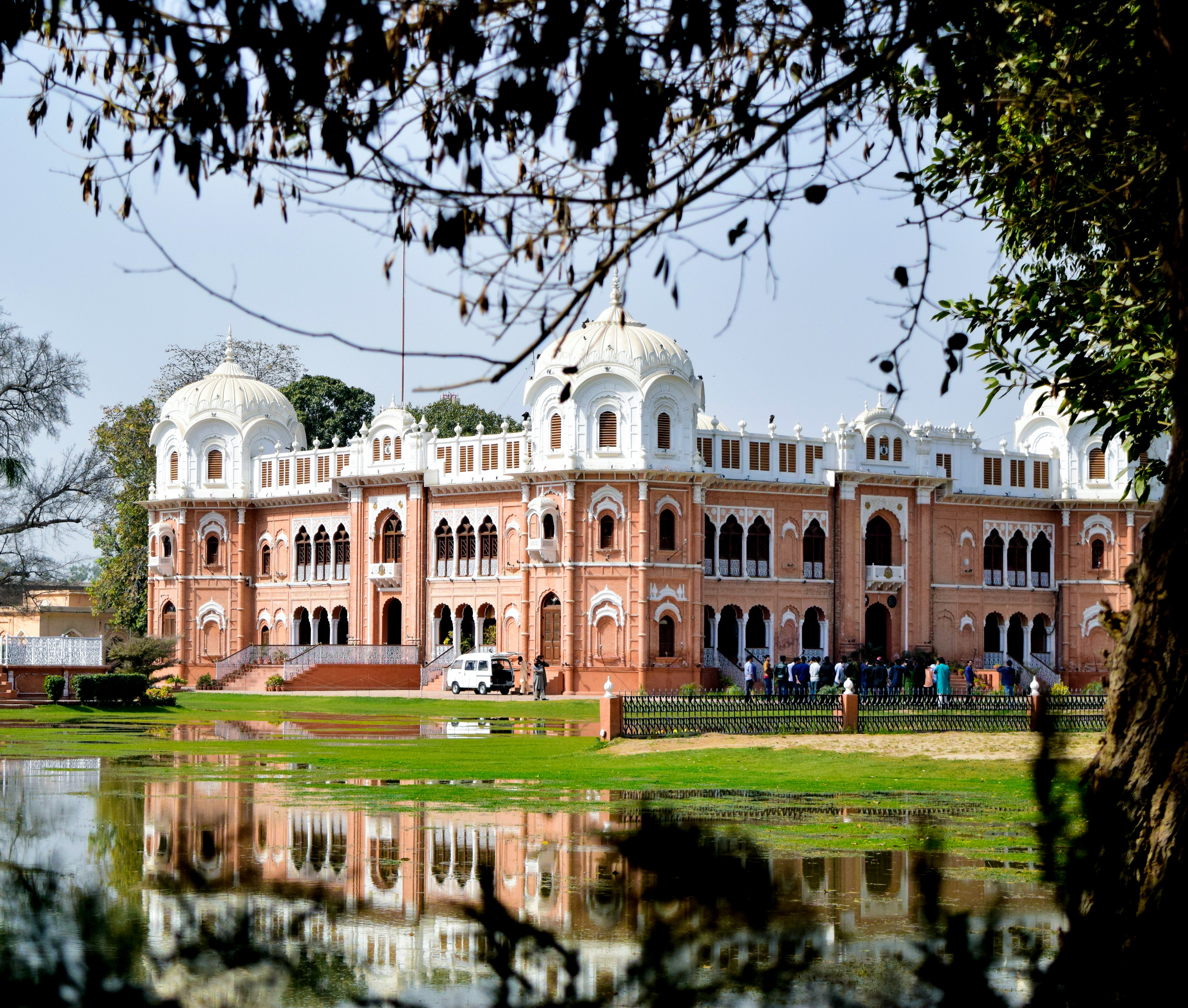
- Darbar Mahal was built in 1905
- Interactive map of the Darbar Mahal دربار محل area

General information
- Architectural style: Indo-Islamic Architecture
- Location: Bahawalpur, Pakistan
- Coordinates: 29.3972°N 71.6998°E
- Completed: 1905

Technical details
- Size: 44,600 square feet (4,140 m^{2})

Darbar Mahal is a palace in Bahawalpur, Punjab, Pakistan. It was built to hold courtly events and government offices of the former princely state of Bahawalpur. The palace sits in a 75-acre (30 ha) garden. The entire palace complex was leased to the armed forces beginning in 1966. It currently serves as the Headquarters of 35 Infantry Division of Pakistan Army and is not open to the general public.

== History ==
The palace was built by Bahawal Khan V. It was completed in 1905, and is near several other palaces within the Bahawalgarh Palace Complex, including the Nishat Mahal, Farrukh Mahal, and Gulzar Mahal. Initially christened Mubarak Mahal, it not only offered a royal dwelling but also facilitated courtly events and administrative activities for the princely state of Bahawalpur.

== Architecture ==
It is built in Sikh-Arabic architecture style which combines local, Sikh, and Arabic influences.

The exterior has intricate carvings, fretwork, and stucco work. Each side of the building features a large entranceway and jharoka balconies. Constructed primarily from red bricks, the palace features a distinctive blend of red and white hues, with the latter accentuating the roofline and windows, while the former defines the exterior walls. The edifice stands out with its four interconnected domes, spacious interiors adorned with over 80 windows reflecting ancient Islamic traditions of the 14th century. The building's third floor is a Mughal-style chattri roof with each of its corners having a highly-stylized octagonal turret with Sikh-style domes. The interior of the palace is decorated with priceless paintings of the 19th century, traditional jewelry, ornaments, swords of the Nawab family. Lavish furnishings, rich carpets, and velvet curtains enhance its regal ambiance, along with ceramic-tiled archways and large lamps that augment the palace's grandeur.

== Gallery ==
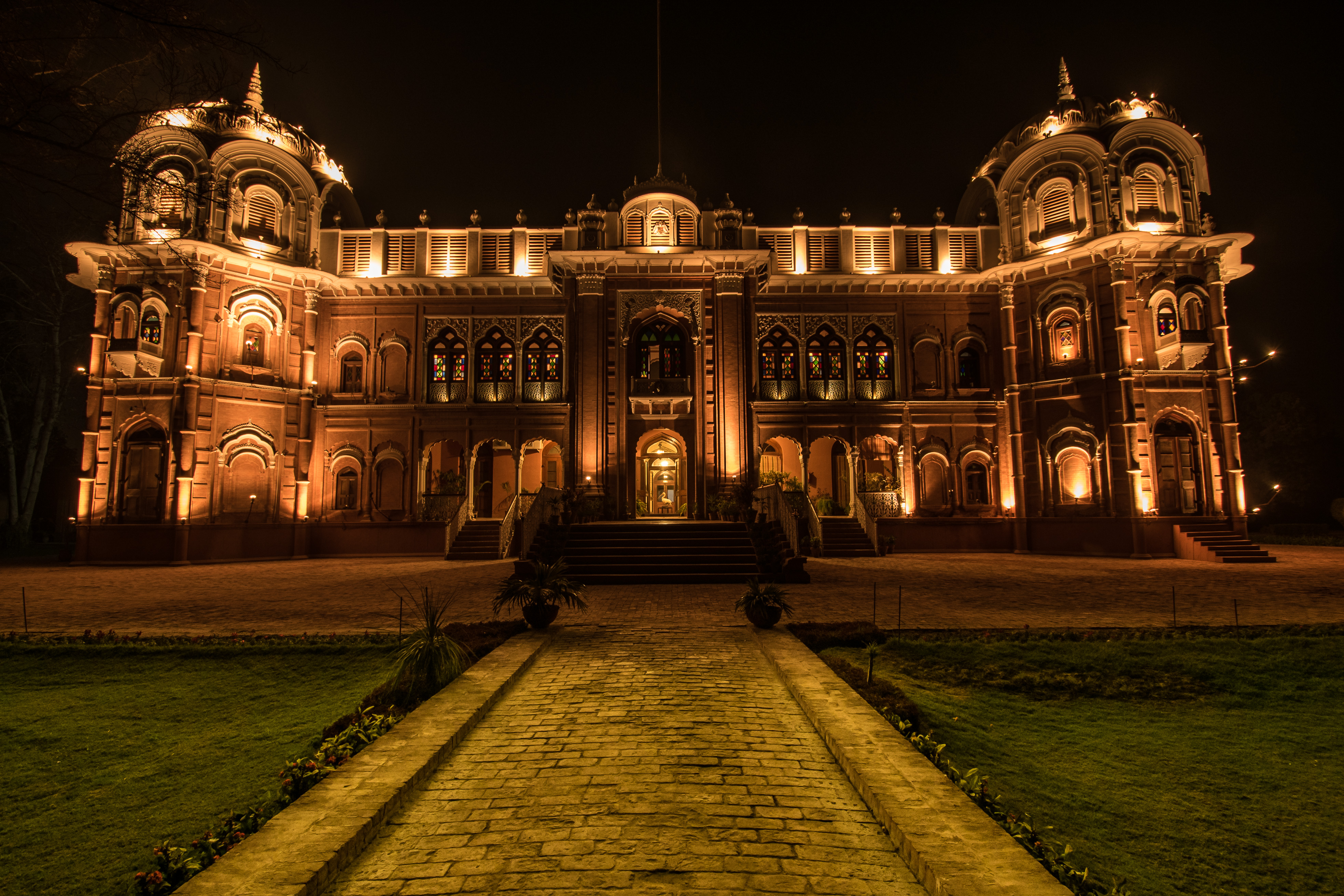
The building illuminated at night

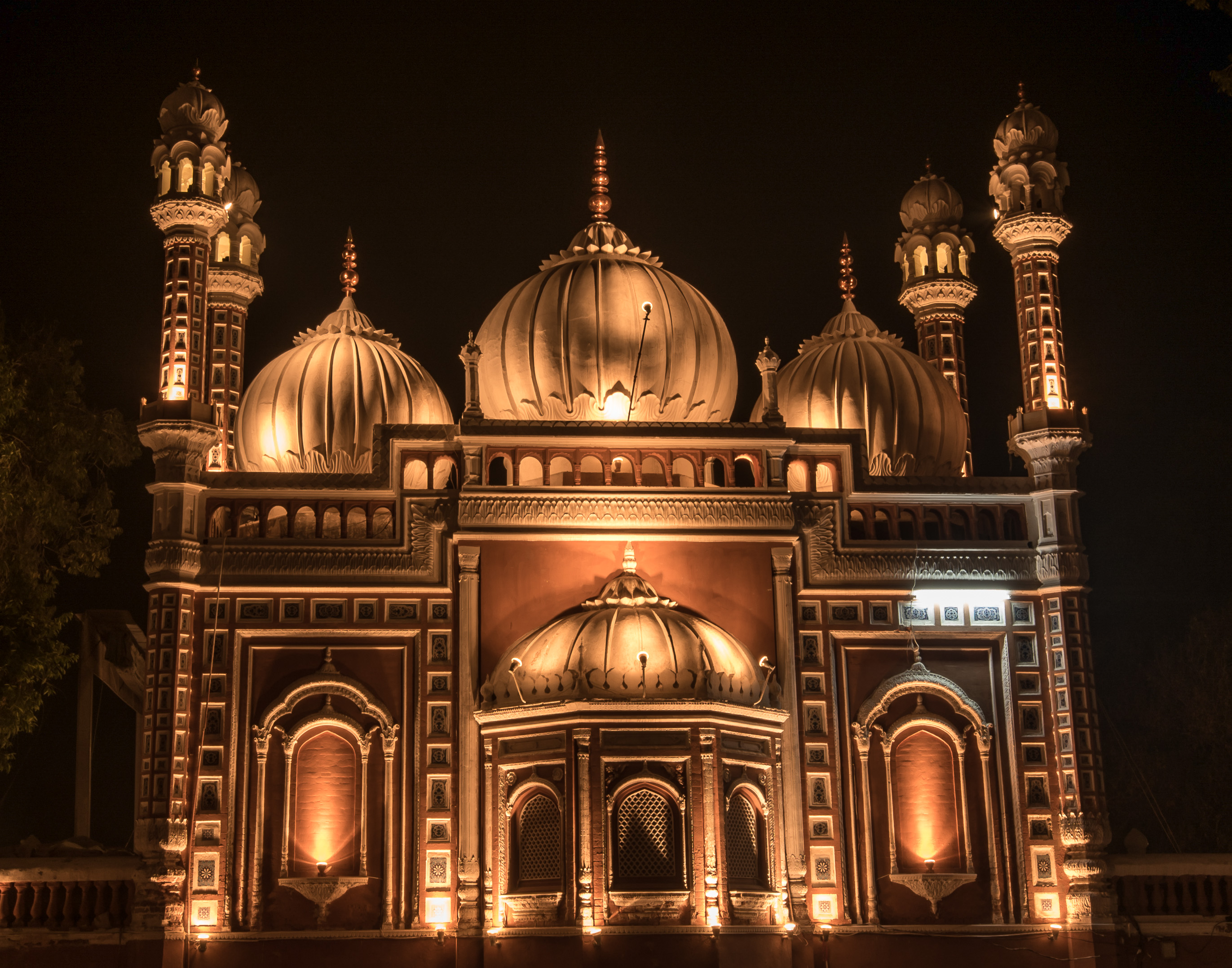
The Darbar Mahal Mosque

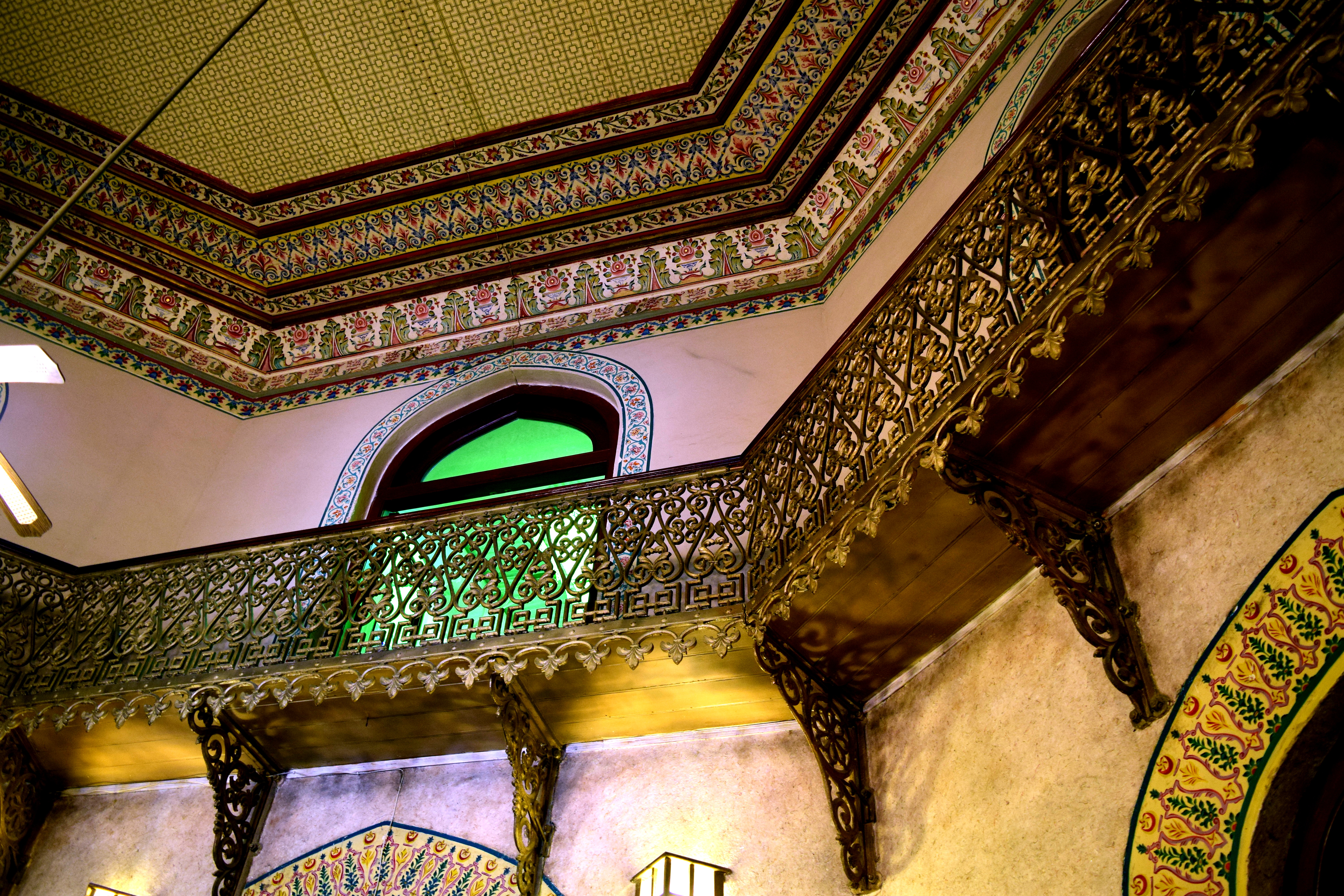
Interior ceiling
