= Qamar Javed Bajwa =

Former general and 10th Chief of Army Staff (Pakistan)

Qamar Javed Bajwa NI(M), HI(M)
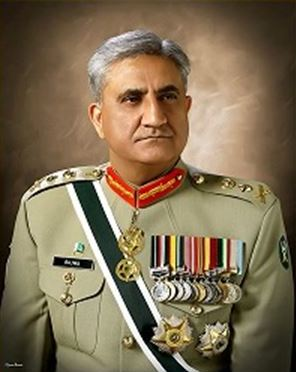
- Official military portrait, 2016
- Born: 11 November 1960 (age 66); Karachi, Pakistan
- Education: Government Gordon College; F. G. Sir Syed College; Pakistan Military Academy; Canadian Army Staff College; Naval Postgraduate School; National Defence University
- Military career
- Allegiance: Pakistan
- Branch: Pakistan Army
- Service years: 1978–2022
- Rank: General
- Unit: 16 Baloch Regiment
- Commands: Chief of Army Staff (2016‍–‍2022); IG – Training and Evaluation (2015‍–‍2016); X Corps Rawalpindi (2013‍–‍2015); Force Command North Gilgit (2009); Commandant Si&T (2010)
- Conflicts / operations: Kargil War; War in Afghanistan; Insurgency in Balochistan; MONUSCO; Durand line skirmishes; War in North-West Pakistan; Operation Zarb-e-Azb; Operation Radd-ul-Fasaad; Operation Khyber; Kashmir conflict; 2014–2015 skirmishes; 2016–2018 skirmishes; 2019 standoff; 2022 Afghanistan airstrikes; 2020–2021 U.S. withdrawal from Afghanistan
- Awards: Nishan-e-Imtiaz (Military); Hilal-e-Imtiaz (Military); GUSP Medal of Merit; Turkish Legion of Merit; Order of Military Merit; Order of Bahrain; Order of King Abdulaziz

Qamar Javed Bajwa (Note: Urdu: قمر جاوید باجوہ) (born 11 November 1960) is a Pakistani four-star general who served as the tenth chief of the Army Staff of Pakistan from 29 November 2016 to 29 November 2022. In 2018, he was ranked 68th in the Forbes list of the World's Most Powerful People.

Originally from Gakhar Mandi, Gujranwala, Bajwa was born into a Punjabi Jat family of the Bajwa clan in Karachi. Bajwa was educated at F. G. Sir Syed College and Gordon College in Rawalpindi before joining the Pakistan Military Academy in 1978. Bajwa was commissioned in 1980 in the 16th Battalion of the Baloch Regiment. Before his appointment as the chief of army staff, he served at the General Headquarters as inspector general of training and evaluation from September 2015 to November 2016 and as field commander of the X Corps from August 2013 to September 2015, leading Pakistan's actions along the Line of Control in Kashmir. In addition, Bajwa served as a brigadier in the UN mission in Congo and as a brigade commander in 2007.

During Bajwa's tenure, military interference in Pakistan's political apparatus increased, with the army assisting in the removals of prime ministers Nawaz Sharif and Imran Khan: critics argued this resulted in economic stagnation. Bajwa was accused of corruption after a November 2022 leak of tax details revealed his family amassed over Rs. 12.7 billion (equivalent to Rs. 65 billion or US$230 million in 2021) in wealth between 2016 and 2022.

== Early life and education ==
Born in Karachi, Sindh, on 11 November 1960, Bajwa was educated at the F. G. Sir Syed College and Gordon College in Rawalpindi before joining the Pakistan Military Academy in 1978. His family hails from Ghakhar Mandi, Punjab. His father Muhammad Iqbal Bajwa was an officer of Pakistan Army who died while in service in 1967 in Quetta, Balochistan, Pakistan. Bajwa was seven years old when his father died and he was the youngest of five siblings. He and his siblings were raised by their mother, who died in September 2013.

Bajwa completed his secondary and intermediate education at F. G. Sir Syed College and Gordon College in Rawalpindi before joining the Pakistan Army in 1978, which directed him to attend the military academy. He was sent to attend the Pakistan Military Academy in Kakul and passing out in 1980.

Bajwa is a graduate of the Canadian Army Command and Staff College and the Naval Postgraduate School in Monterey, California, United States. He also attended the National Defence University, Islamabad.

== Military career ==
After joining the Pakistan Army in 1978, Bajwa was enrolled at the Pakistan Military Academy (PMA) in Kakul, passed out with the class of 62nd PMA Long Course and gained commission as a second lieutenant, on 24 October 1980 in the 16th Baloch Regiment at the Sialkot Cantonment. His father commanded the same unit.

In 1988, Bajwa briefly served in the 5th Northern Light Infantry in Azad Kashmir. In addition, he served in the X Corps in Rawalpindi as a staff officer (GSO-1 Operations). Upon promotion as a one-star rank army general, Bajwa served as the chief of staff (COS) at the X Corps.

In 2003, Bajwa commanded the Pakistan Armed Forces-Africa Command, attached to the UN peacekeeping mission MONUSCO, in D. R. Congo. Bajwa served in the D. R. Congo as a brigade commander under the then-major general Bikram Singh, the former chief of the army staff of the Indian Army from 2012 to 2014. Singh later termed Bajwa's performance there as "professional and outstanding."

After being promoted to two star general rank in May 2009, Bajwa took over the command of the Force Command Northern Areas division as its general officer commanding (GOC), stationed in Gilgit-Baltistan, Pakistan.

In August 2011, he was honored with the Hilal-i-Imtiaz (Military), and was posted as the Commadant of the School of Infantry and Tactics, Quetta, and has also served as an Instructor (DS) in the staff course at Command and Staff College in Quetta, and at the National Defence University, Islamabad.

On 14 August 2013, Bajwa was promoted to three-star rank and posted as field commander of the X Corps, stationed in Rawalpindi. The appointment was commented on by news media that noted Bajwa had been posted three times to X Corps, which is the army's most important and largest corps and has experience of keeping control over the insurgency in Jammu and Kashmir.

In 2014, Bajwa was appointed as colonel commandant of the Baloch Regiment.

On 22 September 2015, Bajwa was posted to the General Headquarters when he was appointed as the Inspector-General of Training and Evaluation (IGT&E). There he was a principal staff officer to the then-chief of army staff Raheel Sharif.

=== Chief of Army Staff ===
In 2016, Chief of Army Staff (COAS) Raheel Sharif dismissed rumours he was seeking an extension of his term. Initially, the race for the appointment for the COAS was rumoured as between Zubair Hayat and Javed Ramday, who was close to the Sharif family. However, prime minister Nawaz Sharif announced the appointment of Hayat, the-then senior most army general, as the Chairman Joint Chiefs of Staff Committee.

On 29 November 2016, Sharif announced the appointment of Bajwa - the fourth by seniority, as the COAS, superseding two generals who were senior to him. According to Pakistani media, his "strong pro-democracy stance and views" may have influenced his appointment as the army chief. Reuters reported that Sharif picked Bajwa because of his low-key style, however in 2024, Sharif's Defence Minister Khawaja Asif, said that Bajwa was appointed to the role on the assurance of retired Maj-Gen Ijaz Amjad, Bajwa's father-in-law. At the time Sharif was facing the Panama Papers case and had "soured" ties with the Military Establishment. Journalist Zahid Hussain wrote, "it was apparent that merit and seniority did not matter in the appointment of the army chief". Bajwa was also noted as being the fourth oldest COAS.

In December 2016, he was awarded the Nishan-e-Imtiaz.

In December 2016, just within weeks into office as COAS, General Bajwa initiated major reshuffle and appointments within military, consolidating a strong team which continued to assist him in his prolonged tenure of six years. The team included removal of notable generals like DG ISI Rizwan Akhtar, Commander X Corps Malik Zafar Iqbal. Bajwa appointed his close confidants like Naveed Muktar as DG ISI, Bilal Akbar as CGS, Nadeem Raza as X CorpsCOAS Bajwa, appointed new two-star major-generals, this included Asif Ghafoor as DG ISPR, Asim Munir DG MI, Sahir Shamshad Mirza as DG-Military Operations, and Faiz Hameed as DG Counter-Intelligence ISI. The generals continued to serve under General Bajwa for six years helping him to strengthen his role in political and non-political domains of the military. The role of General Faiz Hameed under Bajwa's tenure was particularly subjected to several controversies in country's political history. DG-C Faiz Hameed played a vital role in the ouster of then Prime Minister Nawaz Sharif and subsequent election rigging of 2018 Elections, which in turn helped in the installation of the military's favourite Imran Khan as the country's Prime Minister.

Under the command of Bajwa, nationwide counter-terrorism operations 'Radd-ul-Fasaad' launched in February 2017, and 'Khyber-4' in July 2017.

In 2018 he was ranked 68th in the Forbes list of the World's Most Powerful People, compiled by Forbes magazine, which called him de facto the most powerful person in Pakistan who "established himself as a mediator and proponent of democracy".

On 25 July 2018, general elections were held in Pakistan. They have been branded as the dirtiest elections in Pakistan's history with the army under Bajwa being accused of manipulating the elections and engineering a victory for the Pakistan Tehreek-e-Insaf party of Imran Khan over the army's challenger, the Pakistan Muslim League (N).

Khan said at the very outset of becoming prime minister that he had decided that Bajwa would be offered an extension to his term as army chief. According to Mohammed Hanif, Bajwa "was instrumental in bringing and sustaining him [Imran] in power". Khan added that he had not seen anyone else to be as balanced and democratic in nature as Bajwa. After Khan's ouster in 2022 which was orchestrated at the behest of Bajwa, Khan stated in a 2024 interview with Mehdi Hasan that his only regret was trusting Bajwa, who he held responsible for "creating lies and false narratives", allegedly to secure a second extension.

In October 2018, Bajwa was awarded Jordan's Order of Military Merit by King Abdullah II.

On 19 August 2019, his tenure as army chief was extended for another three years, starting from November 2019 until November 2022, by prime minister Imran Khan. However, on 26 November 2019, the Supreme Court of Pakistan suspended the three-year extension. On 28 November 2019, the Supreme Court of Pakistan announced a short order allowing a 6-month extension in Bajwa's term as the Chief of Army Staff, during which the parliament was to legislate on the extension/reappointment of an army chief. On 8 January 2020, the Senate of Pakistan passed the Pakistan Army (Amendment) Bill 2020, allowing for Bajwa's tenure extension up to three years until 29 November 2022.

In April 2022, Bajwa publicly suggested at a security forum in Islamabad that Pakistan had been pushed into dependence on China. After a terrorist attack on Chinese nationals in Karachi in April 2022, Chinese Army general Zhang Youxia asked Bajwa to stop attacks on Chinese nationals, Bajwa vowed to enhance counter-terror cooperation with China.

== Controversies ==
=== Political interventions ===
==== Ouster of Nawaz Sharif as Prime Minister ====
The former prime minister of Pakistan, Nawaz Sharif alleged that Bajwa was behind his disqualification from the prime minister's office by putting pressure on the judiciary and the Supreme Court. He also alleged that Bajwa was also involved in rigging the general election. Subsequently, Muhammad Safdar Awan, son-in-law of Nawaz Sharif was arrested allegedly through pressure in the aftermath of enforced disappearance of Sindh Police's provincial senior police officer Mushtaq Mahar. According to Shehbaz Sharif, in 2018 General Bajwa, DG-ISI Naveed Mukhtar and DGCI Faiz Hameed offered him Prime-ministership in return for abandoning Nawaz Sharif. Zahid Hussain in his Dawn opinion column of 21 August 2024, stated that in 2016 when a journalist in a press briefing held by Bajwa asked him what would happen if the Prime Minister was removed, Bajwa responded; "Nothing will happen," adding "Nothing happened even when we hanged Bhutto."

==== Ouster of Imran Khan as Prime Minister ====
Following Imran Khan's ouster as Prime Minister, supporters of Khan's party Pakistan Tehreek-e-Insaf called for Bajwa's resignation as army chief on Twitter, and Twitter trends denouncing the general as a "traitor" reached over a million tweets. The supporters claimed that Bajwa conspired to remove Khan from office along with the country's opposition parties. Rana Sanaullah claimed that the Pakistan Muslim League (N) (PML-N) was promised governments in federation and provinces as well as the removal of Imran Khan in exchange for vote for Bajwa's extension.

==== 2018 Election rigging allegations ====
On 25 July 2018, general elections were held in Pakistan. They have been alleged by some as the ‘dirtiest’ elections in Pakistan history with army under Bajwa being accused of manipulating the elections and engineering a victory for Pakistan Tehreek-e-Insaaf over the army's Pakistan Muslim League (N). The Election Commission of Pakistan denied the claim; the Free and Fair Election Network (FAFEN), acknowledged that there had been significant improvements in the election process, but noted "It does not augur well for the ECP to reject the concerns of major political parties ... without conducting a probe into the matter, as otherwise the country may spiral into phase of political and public protest and outcry that inhibits political stability", while the European Union Election Observation Mission acknowledged that no election rigging had been observed during the election day in general, although the latter did find a "lack of equality" in the elections. Despite the opposition's allegations, it voluntarily decided not to boycott parliament. Recounts were conducted in a total of 94 constituencies by the Election Commission, after which Khan's PTI emerged as the largest party in the National Assembly, winning 115 seats. According to Najam Sethi, "Thousands of bags will be opened and hundreds of thousands of ballots recounted and thumbprints matched. Thousands of Form 45 will be scrutinized. But none of this huffing and puffing will bring Imran Khan’s house down because he is protected and propped up by the Miltablishment."

=== Assets beyond the means ===
In the waning days of his tenure, details of Bajwa and his family's tax and assets documents were leaked to the press by journalist Ahmad Noorani on his blog FactFocus, alleging an increase of nearly Rs. 13 billion Pakistani rupees in the general's family's assets throughout his term as army chief. Assets included an international business, multiple foreign properties and capital, as well as commercial plazas and properties, farmhouses, and residential real estate throughout the major cities of Pakistan. Bajwa's daughter-in-law became a Pakistani billionaire a few days before being wed to his son, largely through receiving property in the army-run Defense Housing Authority (DHA), while Bajwa's wife became a multi-billionaire through his tenure as army chief, and she was repeatedly warned by Pakistan's tax bureau the Federal Board of Revenue (FBR) for concealing assets. The report has also alleged that the father-in-law of Bajwa's son has similarly amassed wealth, both in Pakistan and abroad, throughout his tenure as army chief.

Bajwa reacted to the report by denying involvement in the affairs of his family members, and by inviting the National Accountability Bureau (NAB) to interrogate them if any discrepancies are found in their asset documents. Following the publication of the article, the media platform FactFocus faced government blackouts in Pakistan. Reporters Without Borders condemned the move, calling it "unacceptable in a mature democracy that a perfectly sourced and careful investigative report about an issue of considerable public interest for Pakistanis should be brutally censored in this way".

Although army spokesmen rejected the claims as "baseless" "propaganda", the country's tax bureau began probing over a dozen government officers, and suspended two high-ranking officers, both in connection to the tax claims, The Pakistani government declared the tax leak by Noorani as illegal, and announced that they had tracked down the persons responsible for what they termed as a leak − contrary to the claims of army spokesmen. In December 2022, the federal tax bureau formally charged three government officers for unauthorized access to the tax records of Mahnoor Sabir, daughter-in-law of Bajwa, and illegally sharing that information. Following the announcement of the government's investigations, Noorani claimed that the government of Pakistan, in particular the finance minister Ishaq Dar (who had labeled the data mentioned in the article an "illegal and unwarranted leakage") had essentially authenticated Noorani's tax leaks by acknowledging the data as a "leak".

=== Alleged human rights violations ===
Conservative Party of Canada parliamentarian, Tom Kmiec criticised Bajwa for his involvement in "toppling two governments in Pakistan" and claimed the Pakistan Army under him was "involved in human rights abuses and had links with terrorist groups."

==== Court martial of a civilian ====
Syed Hassan Askari was tried and imprisoned under Court martial proceedings for writing a letter opposing the extension of Bajwas' term. Hassan was picked up from his home in October 2020 and transferred to military custody. He was convicted and sentenced to five years of imprisonment following an FGCM trial, although neither he nor his family members have received a copy of the charges or verdict, despite repeated requests.

==== Abduction and torture of Azam Swati ====
Azam Swati, a legislator of the Pakistan Tehreek-e-Insaf (PTI) party, claimed to have been stripped and tortured in state custody after his remarks on twitter on Bajwa's alleged assets beyond means.

==== Assassination of Arshad Sharif ====
Following General Bajwa's retirement, the mother of slain journalist Arshad Sharif requested that the Chief Justice of Pakistan formally charge Bajwa, among other military officers, for the "targeted, premeditated, planned and calculated murder" of her son. She claimed members of the military's Public Relations division began threatening Sharif after he emerged as a critic of Bajwa following the success of the vote-of-no-confidence against Imran Khan, particularly in a program called Woh Kon Tha, aired on ARY News, in which Sharif insinuated Bajwa had a hand in overthrowing his democratically elected Prime Minister.

=== Recognition of Israel ===
New Age reported that following the ouster of Imran Khan, General Bajwa's pro-Israel stance appeared to take shape after the Pakistan Democratic Movement (PDM), backed by Bajwa and the military establishment, assumed power.

In May 2022, a group of Pakistani-Americans visited Israel. The delegation sponsored by Sharaka, included Ahmed Qureshi, an anchor from the state-owned Pakistan Television Corporation, who met with the Israeli president.

In 2023, Hamid Mir claimed that General Bajwa attempted to undermine Imran Khan and was "pushing him towards the recognition of Israel" while Khan remained reluctant. In 2024, Mir alleged that Bajwa invited journalists twice to meet with him to talk about promoting Israel. According to the Hindustan Times, citing Israel Hayom, it was claimed in 2021 Zulfi Bukhari traveled to Ben Gurion airport and then Tel Aviv and "conveyed a message" from Imran Khan and Gen Bajwa "to then Israeli spy chief Yossi Cohen," the article claiming it to be the result of "heavy pressure from the UAE". Bukhari denied the visit, stating "DID NOT go to Israel. Funny bit is Pakistani paper says I went to Israel based on 'Israeli news source' & Israeli paper says I went to Israel based on a 'Pakistani source'". Earlier, in a letter to Bukhari, Middle East Monitor issued a public apology for publishing the news on their website and removed the articles. The director stated, "We accept Mr Bukhari's refutation of the claims made in the report and sincerely apologise for the inconvenience it has caused."

=== Resurgence of terrorism ===
The declining trend in terrorism, which started with Gen Raheel Sharif's Zarb-i-Azb, continued till the end of 2020 and the very first signs of its reversal were witnessed in 2021, under the watch of General Bajwa. The next year (2022) was particularly regressive, with a 60 per cent spike in terrorist attacks over the previous year in eleven months so far. A total of 132 terrorist attacks have been reported in the past three months, including 50 alone in November.

Under Qamar Javed Bajwa, most controversial steps taken between 2021 and 2022, were talks with the TTP. The militant group used the time afforded by the talks, brokered by their allies, the Afghan Taliban, and the subsequent ceasefire as a confidence-building measure to re-establish its footprint. The militants were allowed to resettle back in the areas cleared by the previous military operations, as part of the confidence-building measure. The military sanitized those terroritories under the command of Bajwa's predecessors Kayani and Raheel through focused military campaigns. However, despite Bajwa's soft appeasement of militants, TTP eventually walked away from the accord on the pretext of a resumption of counter-terrorism operations in Khyber Pakhtunkhwa, that wreaked havoc in the province in the form of heightened militant activity in 2023.

== Bajwa doctrine ==
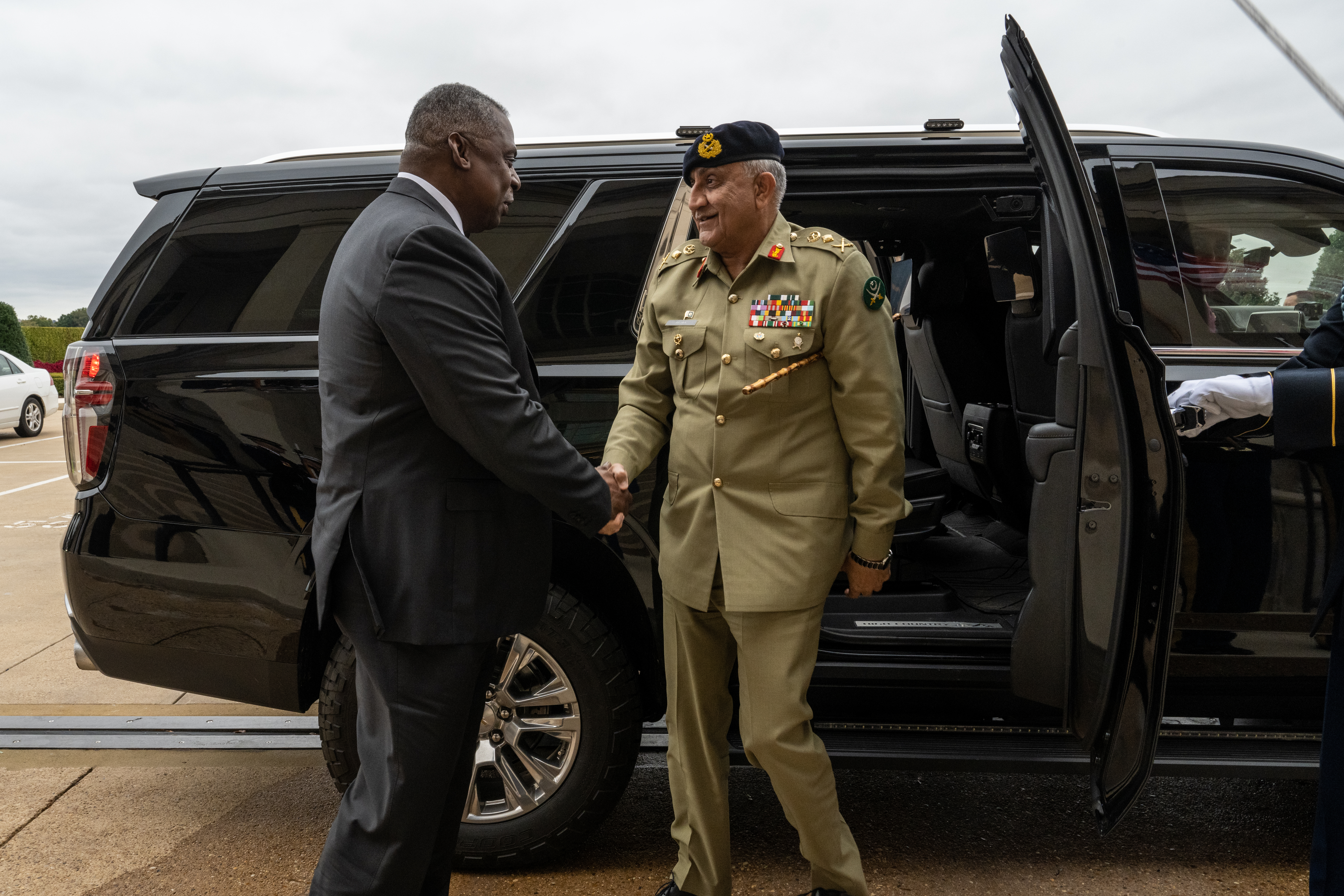
U.S. secretary of defence Lloyd Austin meets with Pakistani chief of army staff in Washington, D.C., on 4 October 2022

The term "Bajwa Doctrine" was coined by the Royal United Services Institute after Bajwa's address to the 54th Munich Security Conference in 2018. This emphasised what he called "biting back hard" against threats from the Trump administration. A second version of the doctrine was discussed with journalists in March 2018, stressing democracy, ensuring proper respect of the institutions of the state, eliminating terrorism, bringing terrorists into the mainstream, and viewing the devolution provisions of the eighteenth amendment with scepticism. He has urged his fellow citizens, especially the youth, to fight extremism, saying it is a key driving force for terrorism.

Journalist Suhail Warraich commented on the doctrine in detail writing for The News International. According to him, under that doctrine, the eighteenth amendment to the constitution of Pakistan and the financial policies of Ishaq Dar (who was the minister of finance in Nawaz Sharif government which was sacked on 28 July 2016) are disliked while financial policies of Asif Ali Zardari are preferred. ISPR rejected that The Bajwa Doctrine has anything to do with the politics and if any such doctrine exists, it is only related to the security of Pakistan.

Some reports stated that The Bajwa Doctrine was at play behind the blackout of Geo TV which started on 1 April 2018. The blackout started after an off the record meeting with journalists in which Bajwa threatened Geo TV with consequences if it did not toe the military's line. The term The Bajwa Doctrine was coined by journalists in the result of that same off the record meeting.

A "Bajwa Doctrine 2.0" was outlined in March 2021 during the Islamabad Security Dialogue. This centred on four themes: an enduring peace internal and external to Pakistan, non-interference in the internal affairs of neighbouring and regional countries, building intra-regional trade and connectivity, and bringing sustainable development via investment and economic hubs within the region. He also said that national security was not the preserve of the armed forces and that "unless our own house is in order, nothing good could be expected from outside," and that "It is time to bury the past and move forward. But for the resumption of the peace process or meaningful dialogue, our neighbour will have to create a conducive environment, particularly in Indian-Occupied Kashmir."

=== Kashmir Policy ===
Hamid Mir alleged that Bajwa compromised on the Kashmir issue in favor of India's Modi government after the revocation of Kashmir's autonomy on 5 August 2019. Mir claimed that Bajwa arranged a visit by Prime Minister Modi to Pakistan and aimed to resolve or "freeze" the Kashmir dispute for twenty years to secure the Nobel Peace Prize, and a third term as Pakistan's Chief of the Army Staff. Journalist Nasim Zehra supported these claims, stating Bajwa sought Modi's visit after accepting the new status of Kashmir.

== Personal life ==
Qamar Javed Bajwa is married to Ayesha Amjad. His father-in-law, (Retd.) Major General Ijaz Amjad, is the brother of Iftikhar Khan Janjua. The couple have two sons, Saad Siddique Bajwa and Ali Iqbal Bajwa. The family, after Bajwa's retirement from Pakistan Army, moved to Dubai. His son Saad is working as a Barrister and a legal consultant, whereas, Ali works as an associate for the Dubai-based United States's McKinsey & Company.

He is an avid reader and is interested in the history of Europe. He enjoys cricket and used to play cricket as a wicket-keeper.

It was reported on 11 February 2026, that he had been admitted to the Intensive Care Unit (ICU) of the Military Hospital after sustaining head injuries from a fall at his house. On 28 March 2026, false reports of his death in a hospital began circulating online. These claims were later identified as misinformation originating from an Afghanistan-based X account operating from Kabul.

== Awards and decorations ==

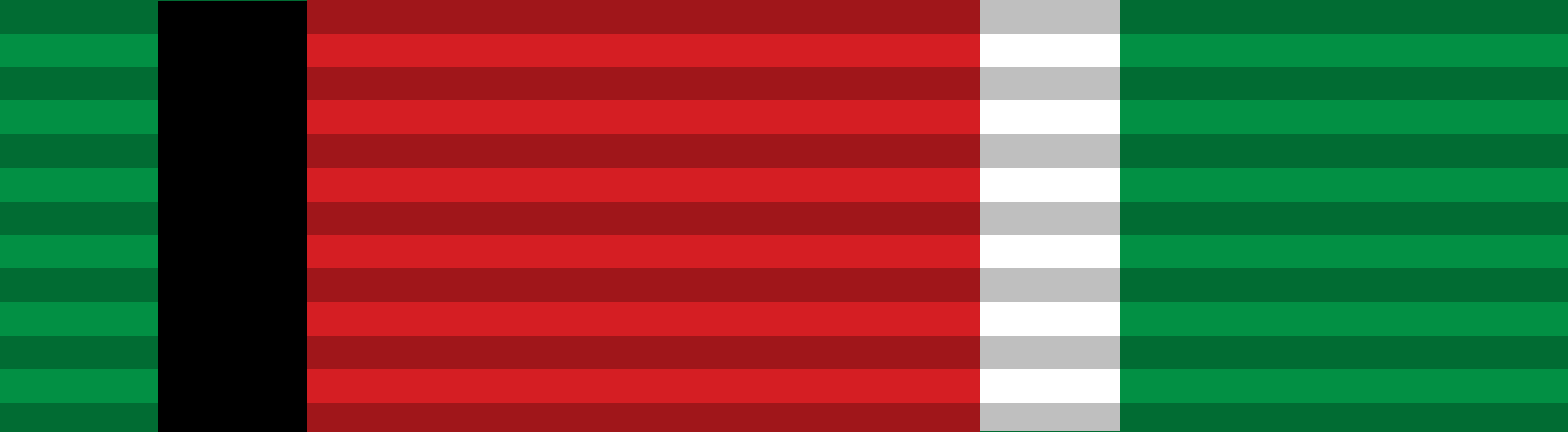

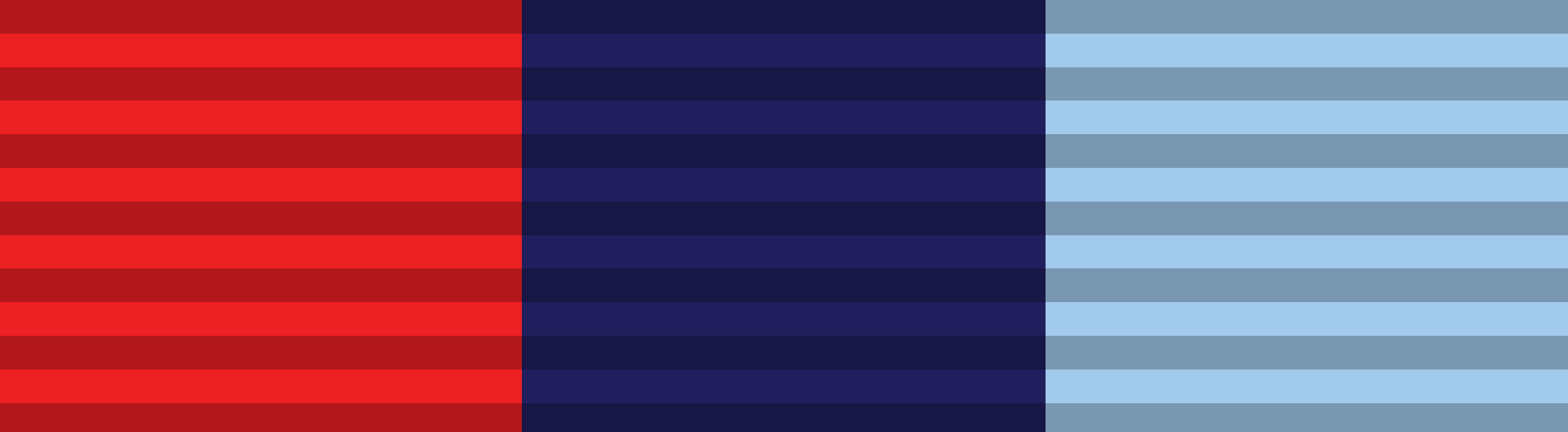

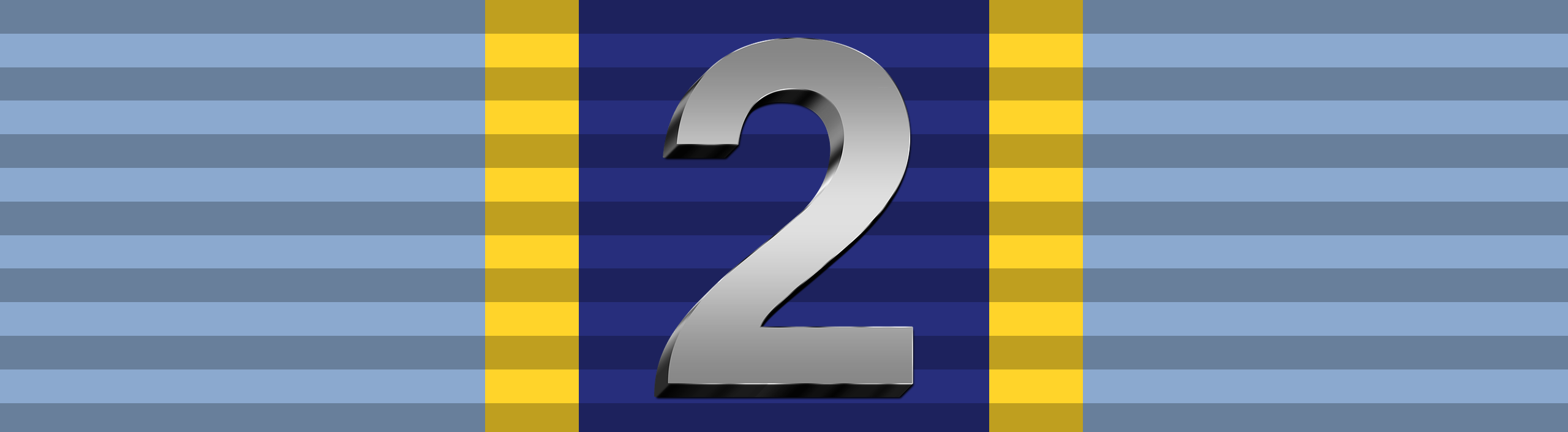

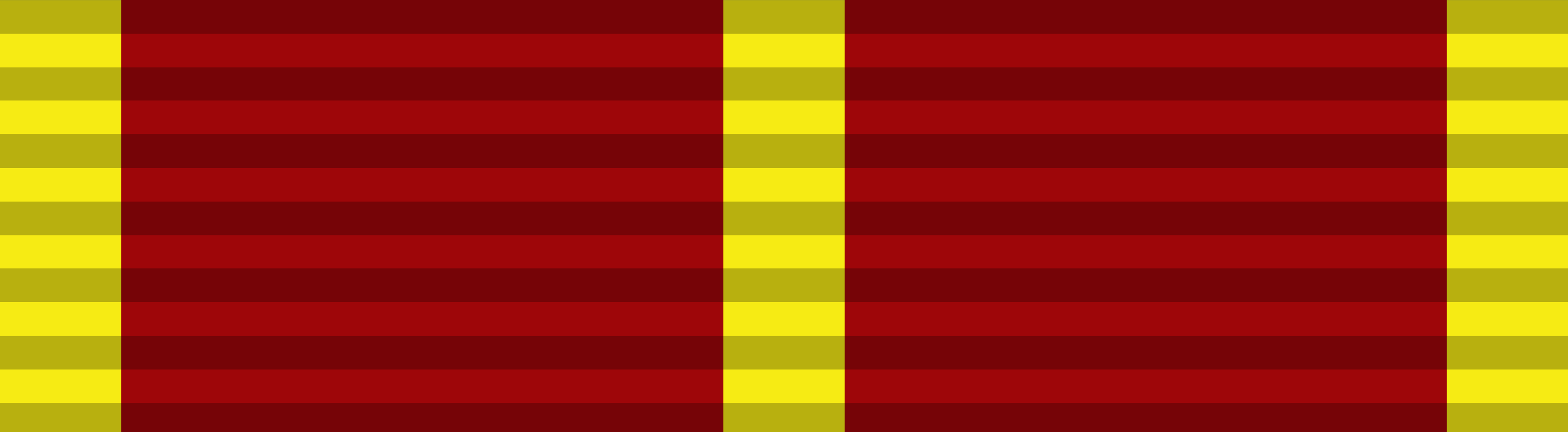

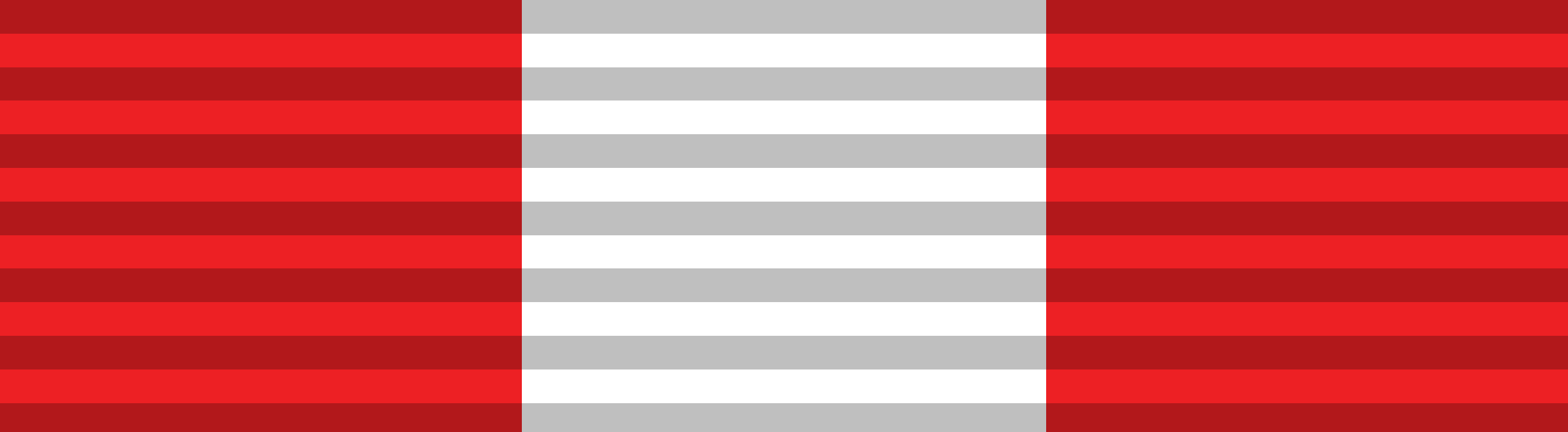

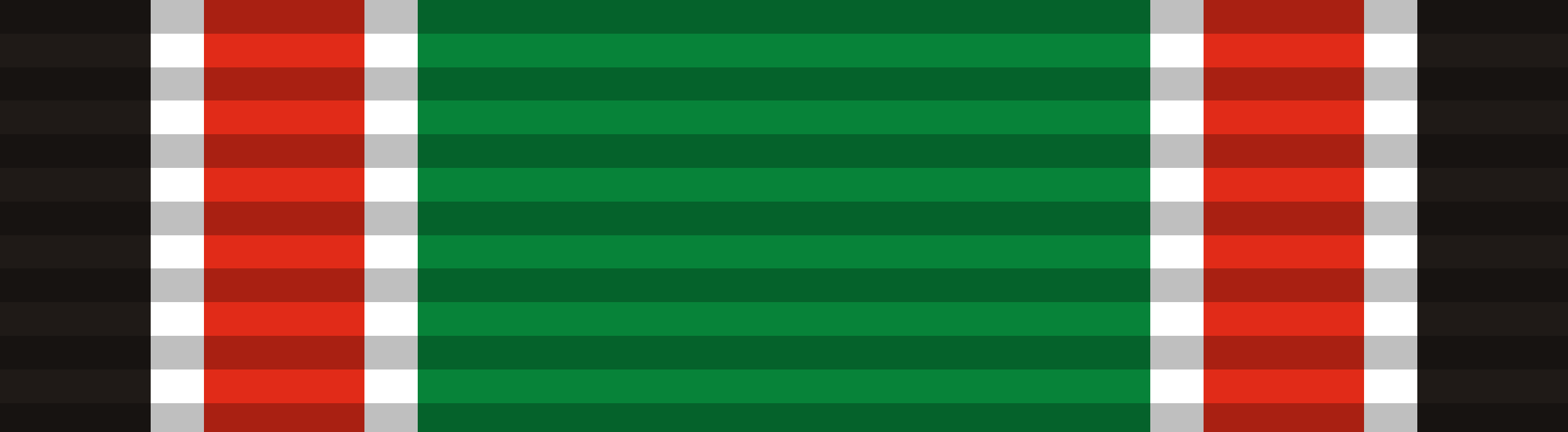

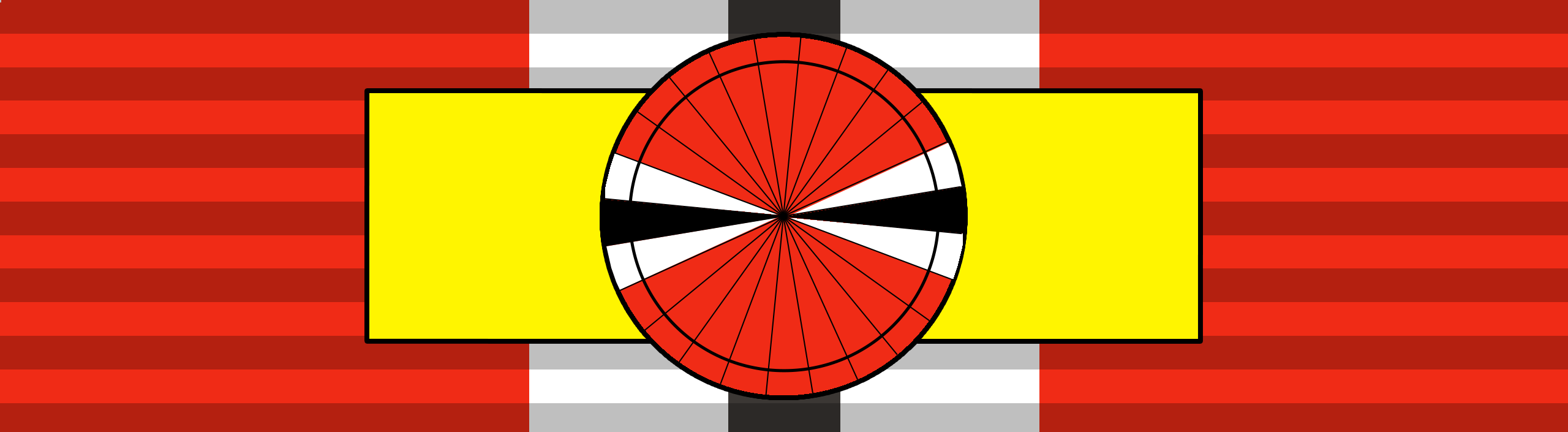

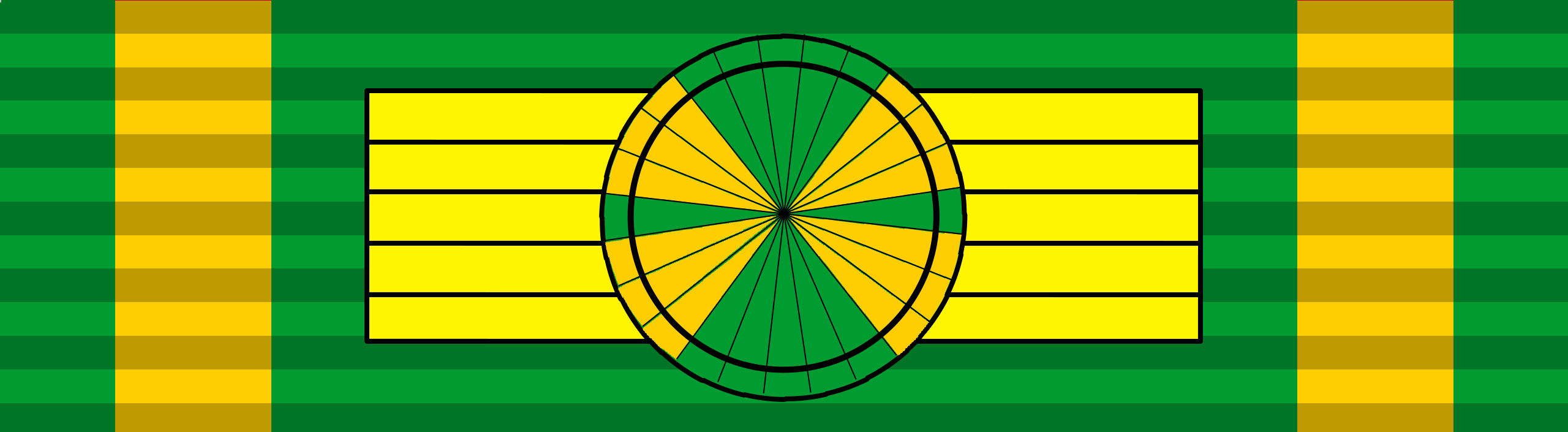

Nishan-e-Imtiaz (Military) (Order of Excellence) (2016)		Hilal-e-Imtiaz (Military) (Crescent of Excellence) (2011)	
Tamgha-e-Diffa (General Service Medal) Siachen Glacier Clasp	Tamgha-e-Baqa (Nuclear Test Medal) 1998	Tamgha-e-Istaqlal Pakistan (Escalation with India Medal) 2002	Tamgha-e-Azm (Medal of Conviction) (2018)
10 Years Service Medal	20 Years Service Medal	30 Years Service Medal	35 Years Service Medal
40 Years Service Medal	Hijri Tamgha (Hijri Medal) 1979	Jamhuriat Tamgha (Democracy Medal) 1988	Qarardad-e-Pakistan Tamgha (Resolution Day Golden Jubilee Medal) 1990
Tamgha-e-Salgirah Pakistan (Independence Day Golden Jubilee Medal) 1997	Command & Staff College Quetta Instructor's Medal	United Nations MONUC Medal (2 Deployments; 2003 & 2007)	GUSP Medal For Merit (Russia) (2018)
Turkish Legion of Merit (Turkey) (2017)	The Order of Military Merit (Jordan) (2018)	The Order of Bahrain 1st Class (Bahrain) (2021)	Order of King Abdul Aziz (1st Class) (Saudi Arabia)

=== Foreign decorations ===
Foreign Awards
United Nations	UN MONUC (Congo) Medal
Russia	GUSP Medal For Merit
Turkey	Turkish Legion of Merit
Jordan	The Order of Military Merit
Bahrain	The Order of Bahrain, 1st Class
Saudi Arabia	Order of King Abdul Aziz (1st Class)
United Arab Emirates	Order of the Union Medal

== Effective dates of promotion ==
Insignia	Rank	Date
	General, COAS	Nov 2016
	Lieutenant-General	Jul 2013
	Major-General	May 2009
	Brigadier	Apr 2004
	Colonel	Sep 2002
	Lieutenant Colonel	Apr 1997
	Major	Nov 1987
	Captain	Apr 1983
	Lieutenant	Oct 1981
	Second Lieutenant	Oct 1980

== See also ==
- Pakistan Army
- Inter-Services Public Relations
- Chairman Joint Chiefs of Staff Committee

== Notes ==
Military offices
Preceded by Raheel Sharif	Chief of Army Staff; 2016–2022	Succeeded by Asim Munir
