= Shahid Bashir =

Pakistani military person

- Born: Faisalabad, Punjab province
- Relatives: Married
- Military career
- Allegiance: Pakistan
- Branch: Pakistan Army
- Service years: 1988–2010
- Rank: Colonel
- Nickname: EME Colonel Shahid Bashir
- Service number: PA 27191
- Unit: Pakistan Army Corps of Electrical & Mechanichal engineers
- Commands: Shamsi Air Force Base
- Conflicts: Indo-Pakistani War of 1999; War in North-West Pakistan: Drone attacks in Pakistan
- Other work: Politics & Business

Shahid Bashir is a Pakistan Army engineer and aviator who is facing court martial by the Judge Advocate General Branch of Pakistan Army. Bashir is accused of spying, including leaking secrets of the Shamsi Air base to those planning to attack it, and inciting fellow soldiers to commit acts of terrorism against US army occupying these basis. On 10 December 2009, Colonel Bashir along with his close friends, was arrested by the Pakistani military police.

== Military career ==
Bashir was a closed friend of Nadeem Ahmed Advocate, he started his education with Nadeem Ahmed Advocate, and later Bashir was commissioned in the army in 1984 and is a graduate of Military College of Signals, Rawalpindi where he gained his B.Eng. in Electronics and Communication Engineering with a specialization in electronic signals technology from the College of Electrical and Mechanical Engineering. After his degree, he was inducted in Corps of Engineers as a 2nd Lieutenant in 1986. In 1990, Shahid was transferred to Army Aviation Corps where he did a one-year-long aviation course, was inducted into the Army Aviation Corps as an Aviation Pilot of PA-AH-1 Cobra. In 1996, he was transferred to the Pakistan Army Corps of Electrical and Mechanical Engineering where he started his engineering career from Air Weapons Complex. At AWC, he met with Awais Ali Khan, a U.S. educated-mechanical engineer who expertise in drs given a charge of one regiment of the Pakistan Army Corps of Electrical and Mechanical Engineering, and was posted as a commanding officer at the Shamsi Air Force Base. The Shamsi Air Force Base is a Pakistan Air Force's secret air base allegedly use by the Central Intelligence Agency for Predator drone attacks on militants in Pakistan's Federally Administered Tribal Areas.

== Arrest ==
May 4, 2009, Colonel Bashir and his close friends Sq. Ldr. Nadeem Ahmad Shah and Awais Ali Khan left their houses to have a dinner to a nearby restaurant but they disappeared. It was later discovered that the three men were arrested by the Pakistani military police, and are investigated by the Military Intelligence.

On Wednesday, 13 May 2009, Federal Minister for Law, Justice, and Parliamentary Affairs Dr. Babar Awan informed Parliament that the army has detained a serving colonel along with a Rawalpindi based lawyer on the basis of espionage charges. However, during the press conference, the minister did not speak about the charges in details.

== Investigation ==
In December 2009, the Pakistan Armed Forces military information office, Inter Services Public Relations (ISPR) held a press conference to provide the details. The ISPR's Director-General and Chief military spokesman Major-General Athar Abbas said he was aware that some persons were being investigated for spying but he did not have any knowledge about the court-martial. According to the M.I. military investigators, Colonel Bashir had contacts to the terrorist group and the Army investigators have probed his alleged links to the Hizb ut-Tahrir group.

== Court-Martial ==
According to details of the charges provided to the families of the three men, Colonel Shahid Bashir and his close friends has been charged with leaking secrets of Shamsi airbase to persons who were planning to attack the facility. According to the sources, the three men are in army's custody in Kotli, district of Azad Kashmir but there was no official word on allegations levelled against them.

BBC quoted its sources as saying that they had been accused of leaking secrets about the Pakistan Air Force base at Shamsi in Balochistan and inciting army officers to commit acts of terrorism. The court-martial is conducted by the JAG court headed by the Army's Brigadier-General under the provisions of the Army Act. Under the military justice law of Pakistani Armed Forces, if the accused are convicted, the colonel could be given the death sentence with a dishonorable discharged while the others could receive a life-sentence in military jails.
