= Pakistan Air Force Act, 1953 =

Pakistani law

Parliament of Pakistan
- Enacted by: Parliament of Pakistan

Pakistan Air Force Act, 1953 is the primary statute governing the affairs of Pakistan Air Force.

== History ==
The act was passed by the Parliament of Pakistan originally in 1953.

== See also ==
- Pakistan Army Act, 1952
- Pakistan Navy Ordinance, 1961

== Bibliography ==
- Wing Commander (Dr) U C Jha (15 August 2016), "The Twenty First Constitutional Amendment", Pakistan Army: Legislator, Judge and Executioner: Legislator, Judge and Executioner, KW Publishers Pvt Ltd, ISBN 978-9-38-628830-1
- Peter R. Blood (1996), Pakistan: A Country Study, DIANE Publishing, p. 299, ISBN 978-0-78-813631-3
- Allison Duxbury; Matthew Groves (4 August 2016), Military Justice in the Modern Age, Cambridge University Press, p. 181, ISBN 978-1-31-654614-7
