= Pakistan Navy Ordinance, 1961 =

Pakistani law

Pakistan Navy Ordinance, 1961 is the primary statute governing the administration and discipline of the Pakistan Navy.

== Application of the Ordinance ==
PN Ordinance, 1961 is applicable to the following persons as per its Section. 2. :

The following persons shall be subject to this Ordinance, wherever they may be, namely:---

(a) officers on the active list of officers of the Pakistan Navy, and [Chief petty officers and sailors] of the Pakistan Navy;

(b) officers on the retired or emergency lists of officers of the Pakistan Navy, when ordered on any duty or service for which as such officers they are so liable;

(c) persons belonging to any of the Pakistan Naval Reserve Forces when called up for training, exercise or service (including active service) in pursuance of regulations;

(d) persons belonging to any auxiliary force raised in Pakistan to which this Ordinance is applied to such extent and subject to such conditions as may be prescribed.

(2) The following persons, not otherwise subject to this Ordinance shall be so subject to this Ordinance shall be so subject to such extent and under such conditions as the [Federal Government] may direct :^{__}

(a) persons subject to the Pakistan Army Act, 1952 (XXXIX of 1952), or the Pakistan Air Force Act, 1953 (VI of 1953)^{__}

(i) when seconded for service with the Pakistan Navy; or

(ii) when embarked for passage on board any of the naval ships;

(b) persons, other than those mentioned in the last preceding clause, when embarked as passengers on board any of the naval ships;

(c) persons who are employed by, or are in the service of, or are followers of, or accompany any body or member of the naval force on active service;

(3) Persons, not otherwise subject to this Ordinance, shall be so subject if they are accused of^{__}

(i) seducing or attempting to seduce any person subject to this Ordinance from his duty or allegiance to Government, or

(ii) having committed, in relation to any work of defence, arsenal, naval, military or air force establishment or station, ship or aircraft or otherwise in relation to the naval, military or air force affairs of Pakistan, an offence under the Official Secrets Act, 1923.]

== See also ==
- Pakistan Army Act, 1952
- Pakistan Air Force Act, 1953

== Bibliography ==
- Wing Commander (Dr) U C Jha (15 August 2016), "The Twenty First Constitutional Amendment", Pakistan Army: Legislator, Judge and Executioner: Legislator, Judge and Executioner, KW Publishers Pvt Ltd, ISBN 978-9-38-628830-1
- Allison Duxbury; Matthew Groves (4 August 2016), Military Justice in the Modern Age, Cambridge University Press, p. 181, ISBN 978-1-31-654614-7
