= Pakistan Army Amendment Bill 2023 =

2023 amendment bill in Pakistan national assembly

- Long title: An Act to amend the Pakistan Army Act, 1952
- Territorial extent: Pakistan
- Status: Unknown

The Pakistan Army Amendment Bill 2023 aims to modify the clauses within the Pakistan Army Act of 1952. Its purpose is to establish the foundational framework for the establishment and continuous upkeep of the National Army. The bill was approved by both the Senate and National Assembly and sent to President Arif Alvi for his signature. The bill, along with the Official Secrets (Amendment) Bill 2023, has been widely criticized by lawmakers from both the opposition and treasury benches.

== Background ==
As per the provisions of the Pakistan Army (Amendment) Bill 2023, individuals under the jurisdiction of the Army Act are prohibited from participating in any form of political engagement for a duration of two years following their "retirement, release, resignation, discharge, removal, or dismissal from service." After being endorsed by the Senate, the bill received the approval of the National Assembly on 1 August 2023. The Federal Law Minister, Azam Nazeer Tarar, introduced the bill in the lower house of the parliament. President Arif Alvi asserted that he had not provided his signature to the Pakistan Army (Amendment) Bill and the Official Secrets (Amendment) Bill, citing his staff's actions as the cause for the confusion.

== Controversy ==
In a news update dated 19 August 2023, it was conveyed that President Arif Alvi had provided his endorsement for the Pakistan Army Act (Amendment) Bill 2023 as well as the Official Secrets (Amendment) Bill 2023, leading to their enactment. Following President Arif Alvi's surprising statements on 20 August 2023, where he asserted via tweet that he had not authorized the amendments to the Official Secrets Act and the Pakistan Army Act to become law. President Alvi stated that he did not provide his endorsement of the Pakistan Army (Amendment) Bill alongside the Official Secrets (Amendment) Bill, attributing the confusion to the actions of his staff. This disclosure resulted in a state of confusion within the country. Through a post on Twitter, President Alvi strongly refuted claims of his approval of the two bills. However, he acknowledged that his staff failed to return the bills to the parliament within the designated 10-day period specified by Article 75 of the Constitution. He accused his staff of not only misleading him but also undermining his authority, effectively concealing the fact that the bills had not been returned.
