= Javed Iqbal Ramday =

Pakistan army general

- جاويد اقبال رمدے

Commander of XXXI Corps, Bahawalpur
- In office April 2015 – December 2016
- Preceded by: Lt Gen Javed Iqbal

President of the National Defence University
- In office August 2013 – April 2015
- Preceded by: Lt Gen Nasser Khan Janjua
- Succeeded by: Lt Gen Anwar Ali Hyder

Personal details
- Awards: Hilal-i-Imtiaz (Military)

Military service
- Allegiance: Pakistan
- Branch/service: Pakistan Army
- Years of service: 1980 – 2016
- Rank: Lieutenant General

Javed Iqbal Ramday HI(M) is a retired general from the Pakistan Army who commanded the XXXI Corps. Born into Arain family, his relatives include Anwar-ul-Haq Ramday who led Operation Janbaz at GHQ, Rawalpindi against TTP and Khalil-ur-Rehman Ramday who served as a jurist in Pakistan.

== Military career ==
Ramday served as GOC Swat during the First and Second Battle of Swat.

In 2011, Ramday was wounded while he was airborne when his helicopter came under fire in the Swat Valley.

In 2012, he joined the National Defence University in Islamabad, first as commandant and then as chief instructor in B-Division in 2013.

In August 2013, he was promoted to the rank of lieutenant general while he was serving as chief instructor in National Defence University. Shortly after, he was appointed as the President at the National Defence University where he served until 2015.

Ramday was appointed as the Corps Commander XXXI Corps in April 2015.
