= F. G. Sir Syed College =

- ایف۔جی سر سید کالج

Location
- 195, The Mall; Saddar; Rawalpindi, Punjab, 46000; Pakistan; 33.5890°N 73.0621°E

Information
- Type: High school
- Mottoes: Hold the Horizon
- Established: 1969; 57 years ago
- Principal: Prof. Shah Imad uddin Hashmi(P)
- Staff: 50^{fgssc.edu.pk}
- Gender: Boys (Intermediate level) Boys and girls (Graduation level)
- Age range: ~15-20
- Enrollment: 1200
- Classes: FSc, FA, ICs, BSc
- Average class size: ~50 students in Intermediate
- Language: English/Urdu
- Hours in school day: Morning Shift : 7:40-12:45 Evening Shift : 12:45-15:00
- Houses: Quaid-e-Azam House, Allama Iqbal House, Sir Syed House, Tipu Sultan House
- Sports: Football, lawn tennis, cricket, table tennis, badminton, hockey (only teams)
- Publication: Sir Syedian (annual)
- School fees: 5650/year (Pre-med) Approx 5700/year (Intermediate) Approx 6500/year (BS) (2022)
- Affiliations: FBISE, University of Punjab
- Website: fgssc.edu.pk

F. G. Sir Syed College is a boys' college in Rawalpindi, Pakistan. It includes a high school (intermediate level) and undergraduate classes. It is affiliated with Federal Board of Intermediate and Secondary Education, and with the University of the Punjab (for the undergraduate level).

== History ==
The institution began as a public school in 1958. In 1968 it was raised to an inter college. Degree classes (bachelor's) were introduced in 1972. The school and college wings were separated in 1975 as independent institutions. Prof. Chaudhry Ghulam Abbas was the one who delivered the first ever lecture of the college when the college started. His son, an ex-student of the college, Prof. Naseem Abbas, became the first teacher's son to be a lecturer in the same department (Pol. Sc.) in January 2000 to 2001 and again in 2005–2006. He was the youngest Head of Department in the college's history.

Dr. Allah Bakhsh Malik, PhD, PAS, UNESCO Confucius Laureate and former Federal Secretary, Government of Pakistan studied here in 1976–78.

Gen. Qamar Javed Bajwa, ex-Chief of the Army Staff (Pakistan) is also an alumni.

== Administration ==
The college was run by the Cantonment Board, Rawalpindi until its nationalization on 1 June 1975. It is presently under the administrative control of the Federal Government Educational Institutions (Cantts/Garrisons) Directorate, General Headquarters (Pakistan Army), Rawalpindi.

== Principals ==
- Abdul Qadir Qureshi (1968–1974)
- M. H. Hamdani (1974–1982)
- Amin Bhatti (1982–1998)
- Ghulam Sarwar (1998–2004)
- Prof. Muhammad Safdar Satti (2004–2005)
- Prof. Obaidullah Bhatti (2005–2009)
- Prof. Muhammad Aslam (2009)
- Prof. Iftekhar Yousaf (2009–2011)
- Prof. Khalid Zareef (2010–2017)
- Prof. Abdullah Khan Niazi (2017-2018)
- Prof. Muhammad Naeem (2018-2019)
- Prof. Irfan (transferred)
- Prof. Ahmad Raza (2022-2025)
- Prof. Shah Imad uddin Hashmi (current)

== Academic programs ==
The college offers Pre-Engineering, Pre-Medical and General Science (With Computer Science & Statistics) subjects to the students who have completed their matriculation (equivalent to O‑Level). I.Com program was started in 2009. ICS program was started in the year 2000. It was a brain child of Prof. Zahoor of the Statistics Department. He established computer labs and managed these for almost 10 years. The college also offers HEC-accredited graduation programs for boys and girls, teaching Bachelors in Sciences for Computer Science, Physics, Economics, Mathematics and Urdu. Bachelors in Business (BBA) is also offered here.

== Departments ==
=== Arts discipline ===
- Pakistani English
- Urdu
- Islamic Studies
- History
- Pakistan Studies
- Political Science
- Economics
- Health and Physical Education
- Civics
- Psychology
- Arabic

=== Science discipline ===
- Physics
- Chemistry
- Biology
- Mathematics
- Computer Science
- Statistics
