= Pakistan Army Act =

Law governing the Pakistani armed force

Parliament of Pakistan
- Enacted by: Parliament of Pakistan

Pakistan Army Act is an act, passed by the Parliament of Pakistan in 1952. It is the primary statute governing the affairs of Pakistan Army.

== History ==
Established in 1952, the Pakistan Army Act regulates the legal code within the military, mainly for prosecuting military personnel and associated civilians. An amendment in 1966, during Ayub Khan's tenure, extended its application to civilians, specifically those charged with inciting mutiny or accused of disseminating classified information and assaulting military infrastructure.

== Legal process ==
Legal proceedings under this Act occur in the Field General Court Martial, under the Judge Advocate General (JAG) branch's aegis. Both the court's president and the prosecuting counsel are serving military officers. Defendants possess the right to legal representation, with provisions for military officers to fill this role if necessary. Convicted individuals can appeal to an army court within forty days.

If dissatisfaction persists after the army court of appeal's verdict, further appeals to high courts are permissible. Depending on the offence's severity, penalties range from two years of imprisonment to life sentences, with capital punishment also a possible outcome.

== Amendments ==
The act was amended in 2015 under the Pakistan Army (Amendment) Act, 2015. The bill was approved by National Assembly of Pakistan on 6 January 2015. This amendment allowed the establishment of special military courts to try the civilians suspected of terrorism. The courts established under this amendment had a moratorium of two years thus setting an end date of January 2017. Furthermore, Pakistan Army Act, 1952 (PAA) was added to the First Schedule of the Constitution through Twenty-first Amendment to the Constitution of Pakistan making it exempt from voidance under the premise of being against fundamental rights. The establishment of military courts under this amendment was challenged in the Supreme Court of Pakistan but a full court bench of seventeen judges upheld the amendment by an 11 to 6 decision.

== Trials history ==
On 10 April 2017, Indian spy Kulbhushan Jadhav was sentenced to death by Field General Court Martial under section 59 of the act.

Under Imran Khan's Prime Ministership from August 2018 to April 2022, more than 20 civilian trials transpired under this Act according to available accounts. Notably, human rights activist Idris Khattak received a 14-year sentence in 2021 for espionage allegations.

== See also ==
- Pakistan Army Amendment Bill 2023
- Pakistan Air Force Act, 1953
- Pakistan Navy Ordinance, 1961

== Bibliography ==
- Wing Commander (Dr) U C Jha (15 August 2016), "Military Legal System", Pakistan Army: Legislator, Judge and Executioner: Legislator, Judge and Executioner, KW Publishers Pvt Ltd, ISBN 978-9-38-628830-1
