= Pano Akil =

Pano Aqil پنو عاقل
- City
- Location of Pano Aqil Pano Aqil (Pakistan)
- Coordinates: 27°51′0″N 69°7′0″E
- Country: Pakistan
- Province: Sindh
- Division: Sukkur
- District: Sukkur

Government
  - Type: municipality
- Elevation: 62 m (203 ft)

Population (2023)
  - Total: 102,701
  - Rank: 124th, Pakistan
  - City: 76,942
  - Cantonment: 25,759
- Time zone: UTC+5 (PST)

Pano Aqil (Sindhi: پنواقل; Urdu: پنّوعاقِل), is a tehsil of Sukkur District in the Sindh province of Pakistan. It is located approximately 40 kilometres (25 mi) north of the city of Sukkur. It consists of 12 union councils According to 2023 Census of Pakistan, the population of Pano Akil was estimated to be 102,701. It hosts a major Pakistan Army cantonment known as Pano Aqil Cantonment. The region has an arid to semi-arid climate with very hot summers and mild winters. The surrounding area is largely agricultural, supported by canal irrigation from the Indus River system, with major crops including wheat, rice, and sugarcane. Pano Aqil functions as a local commercial center for nearby rural settlements. It is connected by road and rail networks to other parts of upper Sindh. Administratively, the civilian town falls under Sukkur District, while the cantonment is governed separately by military authorities.

== Demographics ==
Population

Historical population
Year	Pop.	±% p.a.
1972	11,412	—
1981	20,330	+6.63%
1998	41,255	+4.25%
2017	76,015	+3.27%
2023	76,942	+0.20%

According to the 2023 Pakistani census, the total population of Pano Akil was 102,701 inhabitants. This is divided between the main city area, which recorded a population of 76,942, and the Pano Akil Cantonment area, which accounted for 25,759 residents.

=== Languages ===
Languages of Pano Akil (2023 Census)
1. Sindhi (76.0%)
2. Urdu (14.9%)
3. Punjabi (5.23%)
4. Saraiki (1.14%)
5. Pashto (1.13%)
6. Others (1.60%)
