= Pano Akil Cantonment =

Coordinates: 28°5′2″N 68°43′47″E

Pano Aqil Cantonment (Urdu: پنو عاقل چھاؤنی) is a cantonment of Pakistan Army in Pano Aqil, in the Sukkur District of Sindh, Pakistan. It is located 40 km from Sukkur.

== See also ==
- Army Cantonment Board, Pakistan
- Pano Aqil
