= Bahawalpur Cantonment =

Military cantonment in Punjab, Pakistan

Bahawalpur Cantonment (Urdu: بہاولپور چھاؤنی) is a cantonment adjacent to Bahawalpur in Punjab province, Pakistan.

It was established in 1968 and has an army unit of 30,000 troops. It also is the headquarters of Pakistan Army's 31 Corps.
