= Doaba, Khyber Pakhtunkhwa =

- Town and union council
- Location within Khyber Pakhtunkhwa Location within Pakistan
- Coordinates: 33°32′N 70°44′E
- Country: Pakistan
- Province: Khyber Pakhtunkhwa
- District: Hangu District
- Elevation: 878 m (2,881 ft)

Population (2017)
  - City: 21,341
- Time zone: UTC+5 (PST)

Doaba is a small city located in Tall tehsil, Hangu district, Pakistan. Its population is just above 20,000, but the city has only 1,942 households. The most spoken language in Doaba is Pashto. It is roughly 30 kilometres (19 mi) from Hangu and roughly 15 kilometres (9.3 mi) from Thall. Doaba is Hangu district's third-largest city.

Doaba has beautiful hills and is covered by a lot of trees. The major tribes living in Doaba are Khakhil, (Thorghali and Sarghali,Tarkalanri , Ferozkhail, Merikhail, MandraKhail, Mazanih, Haider Khail, Qureshi, Sarozi, and the Paracha family.

In the mountains is the tomb of a famous religious scholar named Ghani Nikah. It is rumoured that he paid the land price in 1650 when he migrated from Afghanistan to Doaba. (A rich Malik family from Laghman state of Afghanistan migrated during the Afghan war with the Mughal empire in 1638)

There are many shopping markets along with other facilities in Doaba. People from surrounding areas come here for shopping.

In the previous two decades, Doaba was known for the area of education. The Doaba public school is an educational institution in the area.

Big stones, Sweery Ghar (mountain), Chaman, Jangalat, Kautaro Kandao, Zaraa Korna, and Khalwati Cheena are well-known picnic places.

In Doaba, fruits are prepared according to season including apricots, watermelons, plums, grapes, almonds, strawberries, and peanuts. The fruits that are naturally grown are tut and mulberry. People of Doaba has spirit of sports.Most of the sports that are playing are cricket,football and Volleyball.There are many grounds in Doaba mela cricket ground,mile bekh cricket ground,school ground and dogo ground etc.

== See also ==
- List of cities in Khyber Pakhtunkhwa by population
- Kohat Division
  - Hangu District
    - Hangu
    - Tall
    - Darsamand
  - Karak District
    - Karak
  - Kohat District
    - Kohat
    - Lachi
    - Shakardara
  - Kurram District
    - Parachinar
    - Sadda
  - Orakzai District
- Pashto
- Abdul Qudoos Bangash
