= Sadda, Khyber Pakhtunkhwa =

Sadda
- City
- Location within Khyber Pakhtunkhwa Location within Pakistan Location within Asia Location within Earth
- Coordinates: 33°42′20″N 70°19′45″E
- Country: Pakistan
- Province: Khyber Pakhtunkhwa
- Divisions: Kohat
- Districts of Khyber Pakhtunkhwa: Kurram
- Tehsil: Lower Kurram
- Elevation: 1,213 m (3,980 ft)

Population (2023)
  - City: 39,888
  - Rank: 40th, Khyber Pakhtunkhwa
- Time zone: UTC+5 (PST)
- Calling code: 0926

Sadda (Pashto: سده Sada) is a city in Kurram District in the Khyber Pakhtunkhwa province of Pakistan. Located on the Kurram River, it is a big trade market for the people of Lower Kurram and Central Kurram. The main tribe living in Sadda is the Bangash. Sadda is located about 50 kilometres (31 mi) southeast of Parachinar. The nearest main city on the Afghan side of the border is Khost, which is located about 70 kilometres (43 mi) to the southwest of Sadda.

== Etymology ==
Sadda or Sadeh literary means "hundred", and is the name of an ancient Iranian winter festival, traditionally celebrated by kindling fires. The festival falls 40 days after the winter solstice, and 50 days before the March equinox or Nowruz, i.e. on or around 30 January.

== Demographics ==
=== Population ===
Historical population
Year	Pop.	±% p.a.
1951	...	—
1961	...	—
1972	...	—
1981	...	—
1998	17,103	—
2017	34,495	+3.76%
2023	39,888	+2.45%

As of the 2023 census, Sadda had a population of 39,888.

=== Languages ===
Sadda is inhabited by Pashtuns who speak Pashto. The main Pashtun tribes are the Bangash and Orakzai. Other large tribes are the Alisherzai, Mamozai, and Mangal. Being a trading point, it bustles with business activity attracting customers and traders from all over Kurram District. It is now a diverse multi-tribe city. During the Taliban insurgency, Sadda was home to many Taliban leaders before the Pakistan Army took control of the city.

Sadda is a very fast-growing city, which doubled its population between 1998 and 2017. It is the fourth-largest city in Kohat Division and the 40th largest city in Khyber Pakhtunkhwa. It first was notified and recognized as an urban area between the 1981 and 1998 censuses of Pakistan.

== See also ==
- List of cities in Khyber Pakhtunkhwa by population
- Kohat Division
  - Hangu District
    - Doaba
    - Hangu
    - Tall
  - Karak District
    - Karak
  - Kohat District
    - Kohat
    - Lachi
    - Shakardara
  - Kurram District
    - Parachinar
  - Orakzai District
- Pashto
