= Kohat =

Kohat: کوهاټ (Pashto); کوہاٹ (Hindko)
- City
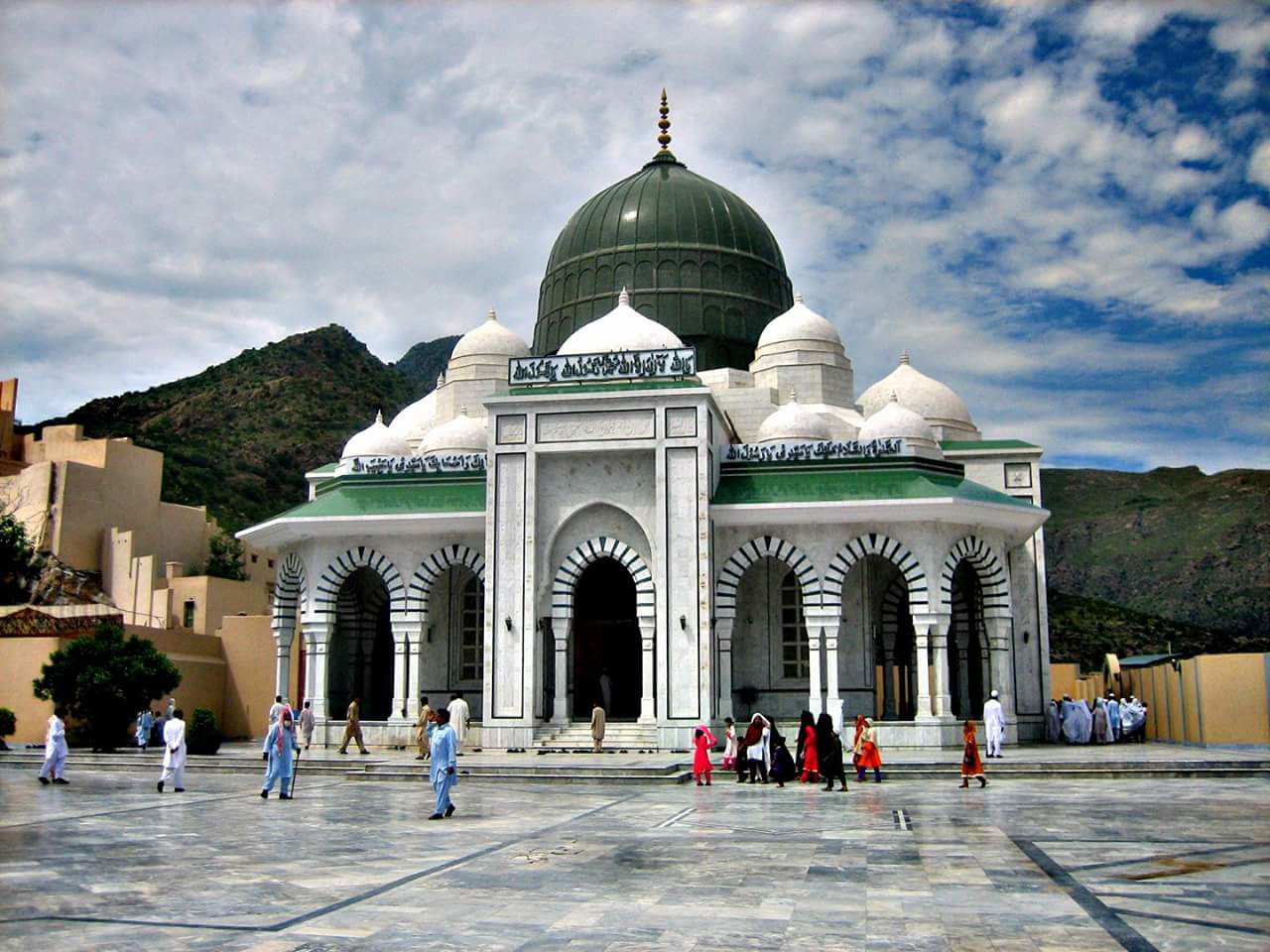
- Ghamkol Sharif, a shrine associated with the Naqshbandi order of Sufism within Sunni Islam

- Location of Kohat Kohat (Pakistan)
- Coordinates: 33°35′24″N 71°26′23″E
- Country: Pakistan
- Province: Khyber Pakhtunkhwa
- Division: Kohat Division
- District: Kohat District
- Tehsil: Kohat Tehsil

Government
  - Type: Mayor-council
  - Body: District Government
  - Mayor: Shair Zaman (JUI-F)
  - Deputy Mayor: Vacant
  - Deputy Commissioner: Abdul Akram Chitrali (PMS)
  - District Police Officer: Umar Khan (BPS-18 PSP)
- Elevation: 489 m (1,604 ft)

Population (2023)
  - City: 235,880
  - Rank: 40th in Pakistan; 4th in Khyber Pakhtunkhwa
- Kohat Municipal Committee: 204,829; Kohat Cantonment: 31,051
- Time zone: UTC+05:00 (PKT)
- Postal code: 26000
- Calling code: +92 922
- Highways: N-55; N-80
- Number of union councils: 31
- Website: kohat.kp.gov.pk

Kohat (Urdu and Hindko: کوہاٹ; Pashto: کوهاټ) is a city in Pakistan that serves as the headquarters of the Kohat District in Khyber Pakhtunkhwa province. With a population of over 220,000 people, the city is the fourth most populous in Khyber Pakhtunkhwa and the 35th most populous in Pakistan. Kohat's immediate environs were the site of frequent armed skirmishes between British colonial forces and local tribesmen in the mid to late 19th century. The city is centred on a British-era fort, various bazaars, and a military cantonment. Pashto and the Kohati dialect of Hindko are the main languages spoken in Kohat.

The city of Kohat is also the namesake of and largest city in the Kohat Division, being over four times larger than the second-largest city in the division, Karak.

== History ==
=== Early history ===
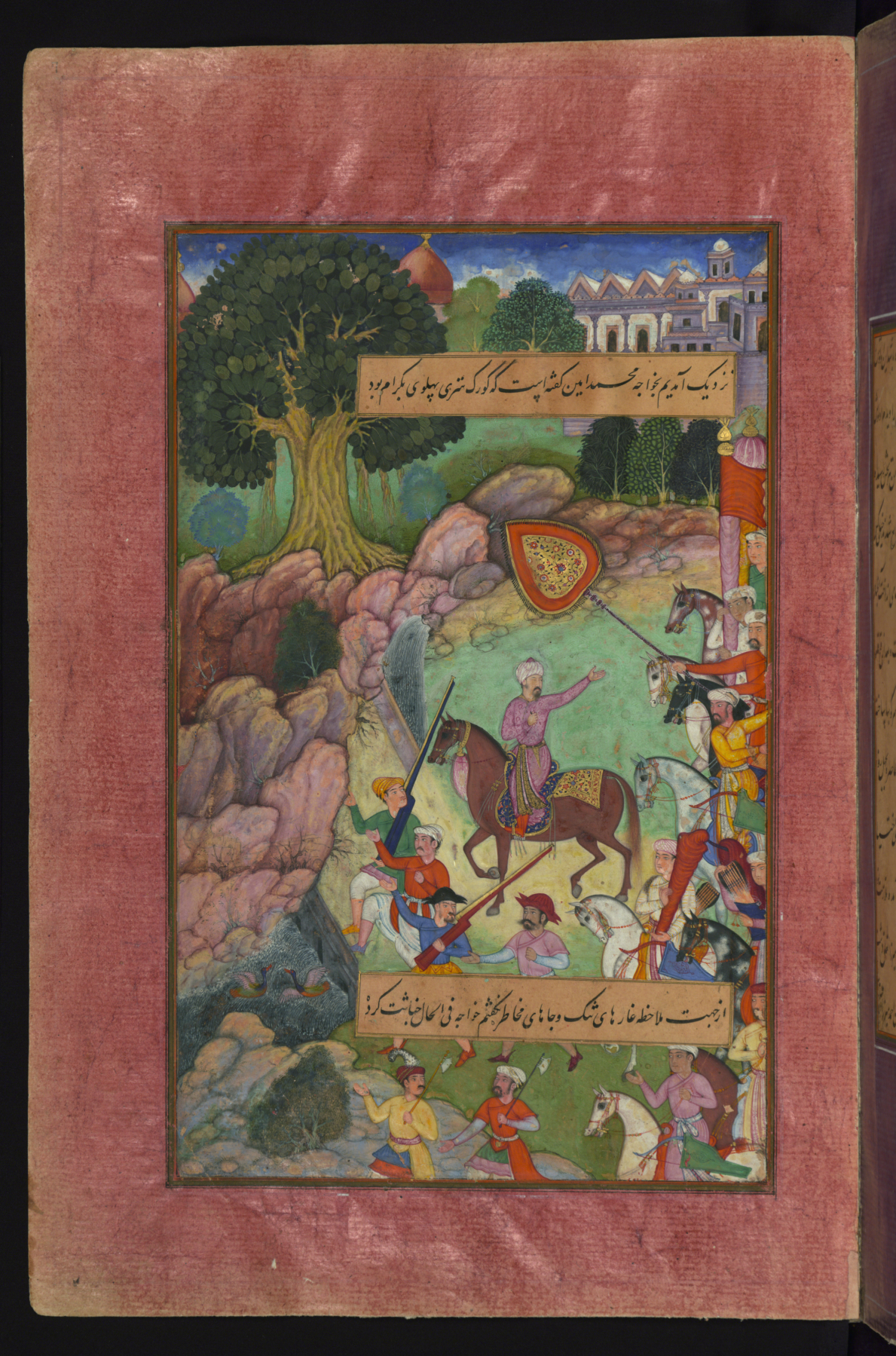
A miniature painting depicting the 1505 visit of the Mughal emperor Babur to Kohat.

Little is known of Kohat's early history. According to local lore, Kohat was founded by an ancient Buddhist king by the name of Raja Kohat. Another Buddhist raja named Adh is believed to have established his domain on the north side of the city. Archaeological surveys have identified evidence of pre-Islamic settlement in the Kohat region. A fort, now in ruins, serves as a marker of their domain. The remains of this fort known as Adh-e-Samut is possibly named after Adh, the Buddhist raja. The fort is still fitted with weaponry from the Buddhist period. These Buddhist kings built roads, which were in use until the end of the Mughal rule.

A survey of Kohat and Hangu districts conducted in 2004 recorded several sites dating to the 1st–5th centuries CE. These sites include Masharano Kotay, a settlement associated with the Buddhist period measuring approximately 170 by 60 metres (560 by 200 ft), where silver coins have reportedly been found on the surface, and Khaza Ghunda, another Buddhist-period settlement with visible wall remains. The findings provide archaeological evidence of settled communities in the Kohat region during the pre-Islamic period.

According to local tradition they arrived here in the time of Daulat Khan son of Bai Khan. This would make their settlement contemporaneous with that of the Baizai Bangash which seems to have taken place previous to the time of Babar's invasion (A.D. 1505). Some believe, however, that they must have arrived before the settlement of Baizai.

The region had been primarily populated by Orakzai Pashtuns, who were then displaced from the West by the Bangash in the 14th–15th centuries, and Khattak from the south. The Kohat region was likely firmly dominated by Bangash tribesmen by the early late 15th century following a decisive battle at nearby Alizai, after which Bangash tribes settled in the fertile valleys and assimilated remaining indigenous inhabitants into the larger Bangash tribe, while Orakzai tribes were confined to the nearby hills.

The first historical record of the city comes from the Baburnama autobiography of Mughal emperor Babur. After capturing Peshawar, Babur was reportedly told of vast riches in Kohat. He invaded and plundered Kohat in 1505, only to discover the tales of its wealth were exaggerated. After capturing Kohat, Babur's army marched towards Bangash country, where he defeated a band of tribesmen.

=== Durrani period ===
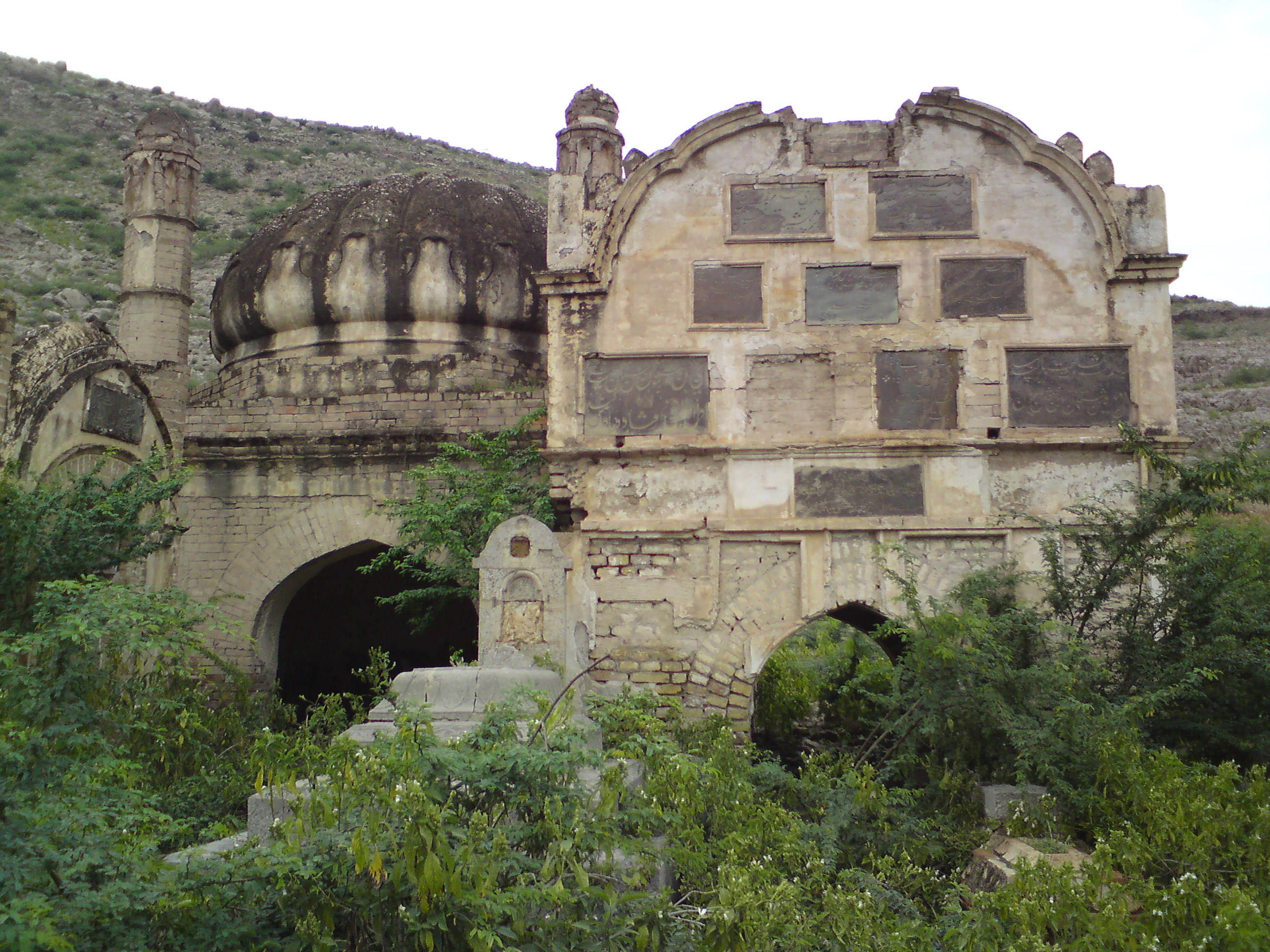
A royal Durrani tomb near Kohat

During the Nader Shah's invasion of the Mughal Empire in the 1730s and 1740s, Kohat escaped destruction as Nader Shah's forces followed invasion routes north in the Peshawar Valley. Following the departure of Persian forces, Kohat was absorbed into the Durrani Empire by 1747.

Following the fall of Shah Shuja Durrani in 1810, Kohat was brought under control of the Durrani kingdom based in Peshawar and Kabul, which leased lordship of the city to various chiefs. The first chief of Kohat was Mirza Girani, who was followed in succession until 1818 by Shakur Khan, and Sultan Muhammad. In 1818, Kohat came under the control of Samad Khan following the collapse of Durrani suzerainty, though the city then came under the influence of Pir Muhammad in 1827.

=== Sikh period ===
Ranjit Singh's armies marched to Peshawar in 1819. In 1834, Azim Khan was defeated by the Sikhs and the chiefs of Peshawar became tributaries of the Sikh Government. Kohat was captured by Sikh governor Avtar Singh Sandhanwalia in 1839, and became part of Ranjit Singh's Sikh Empire, though Pir Muhammad was allowed to continue administering the region around Kohat.

In 1840, the Sikhs abandoned Kohat, and Sultan Mohammed became ruler of Kohat. In 1848 during the Second Anglo-Sikh War, Colonel George Lawrence, the British Resident at Lahore, sought refuge in Kohat, but was instead taken prisoner and handed to Sikh forces in Peshawar under Chattar Singh before being released. In 1849, Kohat and the rest of Punjab was formally annexed by the British.

=== British period ===
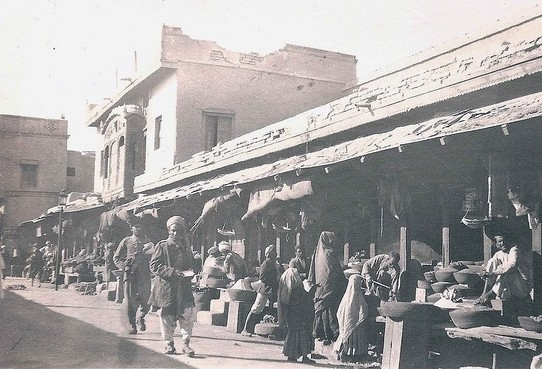
Kohat Tehsil gate in 1919

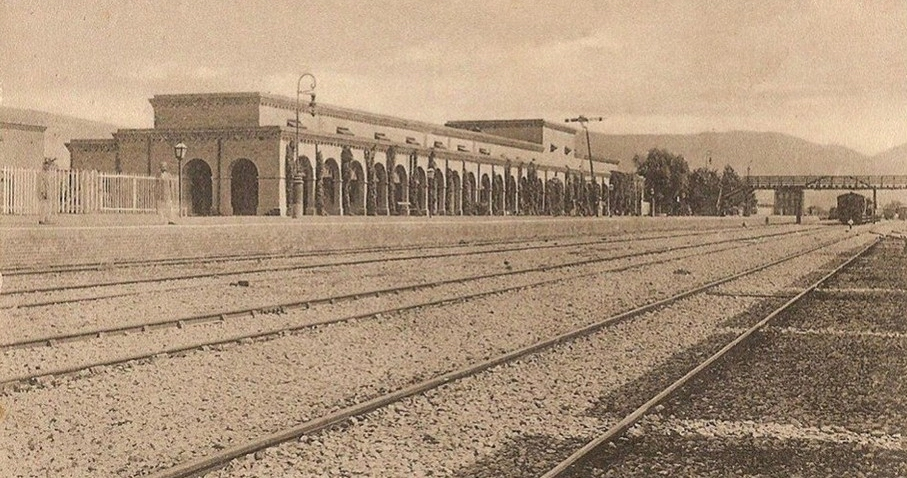
Railway station in 1900

Following British victory over the Sikhs in 1848, Kohat came under British rule and was annexed in March 1849. Lieutenant Pollack was appointed as Kohat's first Assistant Commissioner. British authorities in Peshawar commenced construction of the Kohat Pass road in 1849, and completed it by 1850 despite violent opposition from local tribes. The pass was closed temporarily in 1853 after a quarrel arose among nearby tribes. The road which connected Kohat to Rawalpindi via Khushalgarh was of little trouble compared to the Kohat Pass road.

Kohat remained largely peaceful during the Sepoy Mutiny of 1857, and local Pashtun soldiers largely ignored calls for rebellion. The British established a Hill Station at Cherat, just north of Kohat, in the 1860s. Kohat Pass road was closed on and off by British authorities for several more years on account of quarrels among local tribes, including in 1865 when it was closed for more than one and a half years. Armed skirmishes between British forces and Pashtun tribesmen continued on and off between the 1860s and 1870s. Kohat Cantonment was established by the British in 1874. Routes between Kohat and Bannu and Thall were frequently blockaded by Wazir tribesmen by 1880 that resulted in large clashes between the British and Wazirs. In the Tirah campaign of 1897–98 Kohat was the starting point of Sir William Lockhart's expedition against the Afridis and Mohmands.

In 1924, Kohat was the scene of widespread communal rioting that resulted in a 21-day fast by Mohandas Gandhi, known popularly as Mahatma Gandhi, as a plea for unity. During the 1947 Kashmir War, Pashtun tribesmen from around the region convened in Kohat before departing for Kashmir in hopes of capturing the territory for Pakistan.

=== Modern period ===
Kohat suffered several attacks during the War in North-West Pakistan and war on terror between 2008 and 2014. 35 people were killed in a suicide bombing in 2009, while twin bombings in April 2010 killed 41. 20 more were killed in a suicide bombing on the Old Police Lines in September 2010, while the Kohat Tunnel was attacked by the Pakistani Taliban in January 2011, resulting in the deaths of 5 people. 2 more were killed in a bomb attack in July 2013. In February 2014, 12 were killed in a roadside blast near the city, while 6 more were killed in an attack on a van in October 2014. After a few years' lull in violence, 5 policemen were killed outside of Kohat following an anti-terror operation in May 2017.

On 18 September 2026, another attack occurred on the Old Police Lines, killing 31 people and injuring 103 others. The Pakistani military alleged the attackers originated from Afghanistan and launched 3 airstrikes in retaliation.

== Geography ==
=== Topography ===
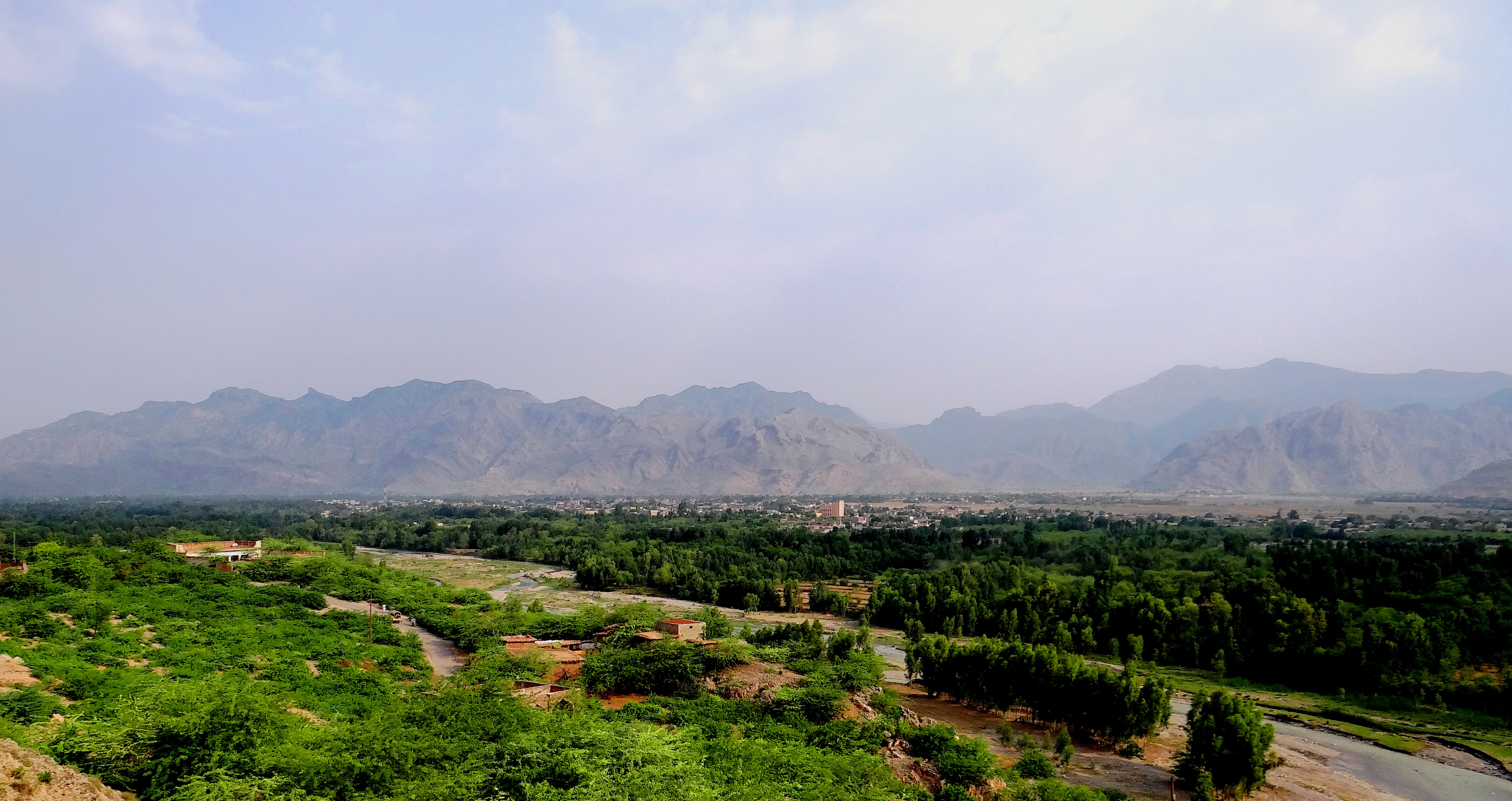
Kohat Valley

Kohat city is located at an altitude of 489 metres (1,604 ft). Kohat Pass lies to the north. It is situated on the left bank of the Toi river at a point where after running nearly due east for 50 miles (80 km), it turns to the south. The total area of the district is 2,545 square kilometres (983 sq mi)

=== Climate ===
Kohat has a hot semi-arid climate (Köppen climate classification BSh).

Climate data for Kohat (1961–1990)
Month	Jan	Feb	Mar	Apr	May	Jun	Jul	Aug	Sep	Oct	Nov	Dec	Year
Mean daily maximum °C (°F)	17 (63)	20 (68)	25 (77)	31 (88)	36 (97)	38 (100)	35 (95)	34 (93)	33 (91)	30 (86)	23 (73)	18 (64)	28 (82)
Mean daily minimum °C (°F)	4 (39)	7 (45)	11 (52)	16 (61)	21 (70)	24 (75)	24 (75)	24 (75)	21 (70)	15 (59)	8 (46)	5 (41)	15 (59)
Average rainfall mm (inches)	25 (1.0)	31 (1.2)	31 (1.2)	20 (0.8)	36 (1.4)	44 (1.7)	114 (4.5)	95 (3.7)	44 (1.7)	16 (0.6)	9 (0.4)	39 (1.5)	504 (19.7)
Source: My Weather

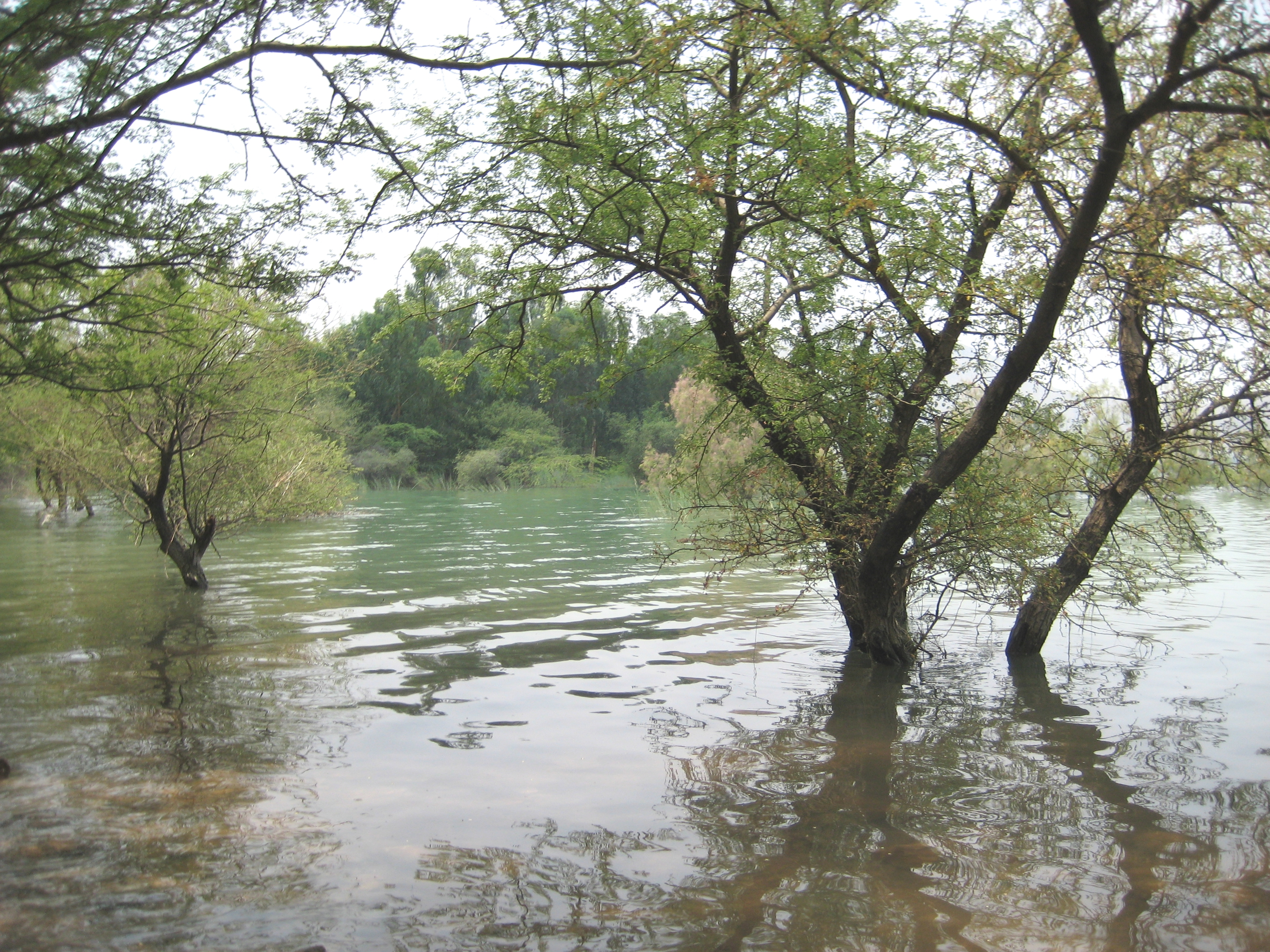
Tanda lake in monsoon

=== Dam ===
Kohat has a dam called Tanda Dam located on Tanda Lake, which is a protected site under the Ramsar Convention. Completed in 1967, it was included as a Ramsar site on 23 July 1976.

=== Parks ===
==== Tanda Wildlife Park ====
Tanda Wildlife Park is located near Kohat city. The total area of the park is 2800 acres (11 km^{2}), consisting of Tanda reservoir and its catchments in Kohat. This is the largest wildlife park of Khyber Pakhtunkhwa. Its wonderfully rich and varied landscape supports a range of mammals and birds, both migratory and indigenous, as well as a few reptiles. Kohat is famous for guava.

The park is bounded by three different villages, Bar, Kaghazi, and Tanda Banda. The park is approachable by Hangu-kaghazi gravel road, shahpur-Bar road which is 18 km (11 mi) from Kohat.

The local people do not have any right of grazing, lopping or firewood collection as the ownership lies with the provincial government. The park area falls in the natural habitat of urial and chinkara, and also provides suitable habitat to hog deer. The urial is associated with scrub forest of Olea species and Accassia species. Urial were once abundant in the area but due to continuous habitat destruction these were disappeared from the area in the near past. The natural habitat of urial and chinkara lies in close proximity of human habitation.

==== Kotal Pheasantry ====
Kotal Pheasantry is established in Kotal wildlife park in district Kohat over an area of 1 kanal, with an objective to propagate and provide breeding environment to exotic/indigenous wildlife species like silver pheasant, golden pheasant, reeves pheasant, pea-cock etc. About 20–30 visitors including students and general public visit the pheasantry for education and recreation purposes per day. There are four species of pheasants in the pheasantry including ring necked pheasant, silver pheasant, peacock pheasant and white pheasant.

== Demographics ==
=== Population ===
Historical Population

Year	Pop.	±% p.a.
1941	44,977	—
1951	40,534	−1.03%
1961	49,854	+2.09%
1972	65,202	+2.47%

Year	Pop.	±% p.a.
1981	77,604	+1.95%
1998	126,627	+2.92%
2017	228,779	+3.16%
2023	235,880	+0.51%

Kohat is regarded as a centre of the Bangash tribe of Pashtuns, who have lived in the region since the late 15th century.

=== Languages ===
Languages by number of speakers (urban) in the Kohat Tehsil, 2023
1. Pashto (73.3%)
2. Hindko (19.7%)
3. Urdu (3.75%)
4. Punjabi (2.41%)
5. Others (0.85%)

According to the 2023 Census of Pakistan, Pashto is overwhelmingly dominant in Kohat City, spoken by 73.30% of the population. Hindko is the second most common first language at 19.70%, Urdu accounts for 3.75% of speakers, followed by Punjabi at 2.41%, this is followed by an additional 0.85% which consists of a multitude of other languages spoken in Pakistan (mostly Saraiki and Sindhi).

=== Religion ===
Religious groups in Kohat City (1881−2017) (Note: 1881-1941: Data for the entirety of the town of Kohat, which included Kohat Municipality and Kohat Cantonment.)
Religious group	1881		1901		1911		1921		1931		1941		2017	
Religious group	Pop.	%	Pop.	%	Pop.	%	Pop.	%	Pop.	%	Pop.	%	Pop.	%
Islam	13,752	75.65%	19,818	64.42%	15,930	70.32%	18,898	67.85%	24,388	71%	32,111	71.39%	224,520	98.23%
Hinduism (Note: 1931-1941: Including Ad-Dharmis)	2,798	15.39%	7,833	25.46%	4,850	21.41%	5,796	20.81%	6,709	19.53%	8,250	18.34%	978	0.43%
Sikhism	1,562	8.59%	2,832	9.21%	1,693	7.47%	2,139	7.68%	2,152	6.26%	3,562	7.92%	—N/a	—N/a
Jainism	0	0%	0	0%	0	0%	0	0%	0	0%	—N/a	—N/a	—N/a	—N/a
Christianity	—N/a	—N/a	279	0.91%	168	0.74%	1,020	3.66%	1,101	3.21%	445	0.99%	2,942	1.29%
Judaism	—N/a	—N/a	0	0%	13	0.06%	0	0%	0	0%	0	0%	—N/a	—N/a
Zoroastrianism	—N/a	—N/a	0	0%	0	0%	0	0%	0	0%	0	0%	—N/a	—N/a
Buddhism	—N/a	—N/a	0	0%	0	0%	0	0%	0	0%	—N/a	—N/a	—N/a	—N/a
Ahmadiyya	—N/a	—N/a	—N/a	—N/a	—N/a	—N/a	—N/a	—N/a	—N/a	—N/a	—N/a	—N/a	51	0.02%
Others	67	0.37%	0	0%	0	0%	0	0%	0	0%	609	1.35%	64	0.03%
Total population	18,179	100%	30,762	100%	22,654	100%	27,853	100%	34,350	100%	44,977	100%	228,555	100%

== Transportation ==
=== Rail ===
Construction of the Kohat Tehsil railway station and railway line was started in 1897, and was completed in 1902. The Kohat Cantonment railway station serves as the terminus for the Khushalgarh–Kohat–Thal Railway - which ceased onward narrow gauge (762 mm or 2 ft 6 in) railway service to Thall in 1991. Kohat is the terminus railway station of Kohat–Jand railway line and has daily train service to Rawalpindi.

The Kohat Rail Service, suspended in 2013 due to unforeseen circumstances, caused immense hardship for the local population. Undeterred, President Saleem Altaf Advocate spearheaded a peaceful movement through Karwaan-E-Amal Kohat. Following a resilient 4-year struggle, the Kohat Rail Service was triumphantly restored in 2017. Today, millions of people in Kohat reap the benefits of this vital transportation link.

=== Air ===
The nearest airport served by commercial services is Bacha Khan International Airport in Peshawar. Kohat Airbase (IATA: OHT, ICAO: OPKT) is a Pakistan Air Force base that began as a runway built by the British. PIA once used the airport using de Havilland Twin Otter, though Kohat is no longer served by commercial services.

=== Road ===
Kohat is a major node on the N-55 Indus Highway that connects Peshawar to Karachi, and the N-80 highway that connects Kohat to Islamabad. The 1.9 kilometres (1.2 mi) Kohat Tunnel was completed in 2004, and connects the southern districts of Khyber Pakhtunkhwa to Peshawar. Constructed with Japanese assistance, the tunnel drastically reduced travel times across the Kohat Pass.

== Media ==
- Radio Pakistan Kohat
- Kohat Press Club

== In popular culture ==
Kohat plays a central role in the eighth season of U.S. political thriller Homeland particularly in the episodes Threnody(s), In Full Flight and Designated Driver.

== Education ==
=== Universities ===
- University of Engineering and Technology Peshawar Kohat Campus
- Kohat University of Science & Technology
- Preston University in Kohat

=== Colleges ===
- Khyber Medical College Peshawar Campus
- Cadet College Kohat
- Garrison Cadet College Kohat
- Government Degree College Kohat

== Historical military significance ==
Kohat Cantonment was established in the British Era, and it is one of the eight cantonments falling in the Peshawar region. Kohat is also the headquarters of Pakistan's Inter Services Selection Board (ISSB), which selects commissioned officers for the Pakistan armed forces of Pakistan including the Army, Navy and Air Force.

== Notable people ==
- Afzal Bangash, politician and co-founder and president of the Mazdoor Kisan Party
- Iftikhar Hussain Shah, former Governor of Khyber Pakhtunkhwa province
- Malik Saad, Pakistani police officer
- Shahid Afridi, Pakistani international cricketer and former captain of Pakistan national cricket team.
- Rohan Mustafa, Pakistani-born United Arab Emirates cricketer.
- Rashid Mansoor, Pakistani cricketer

== See also ==
- List of cities in Pakistan by population
- List of cities in Khyber Pakhtunkhwa by population
- Kohat Division
  - Hangu District
    - Doaba
    - Hangu
    - Tall
  - Karak District
    - Karak
  - Kohat District
    - Lachi
    - Shakardara
  - Kurram District
    - Parachinar
    - Sadda
  - Orakzai District
- Pashto
- Hindko
  - Kohati
- 1924 Kohat riots
- Jhandi railway station
