= Karak, Pakistan =

Karak کرك
- City
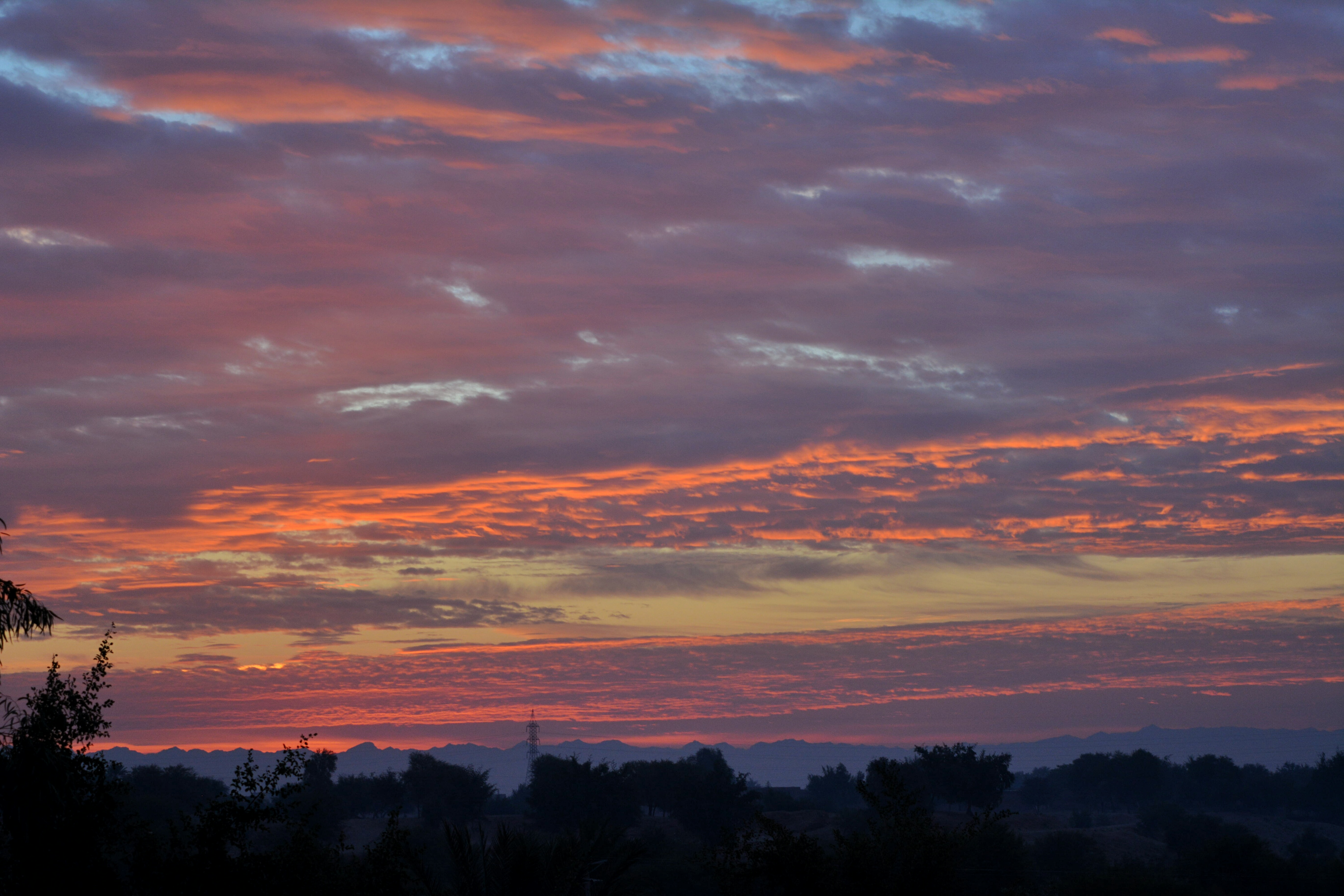

- Location within Khyber Pakhtunkhwa Location within Pakistan Location within Asia Location within Earth
- Coordinates: 33°7′N 71°6′E
- Country: Pakistan
- Province: Khyber Pakhtunkhwa
- Divisions: Kohat Division
- Districts of Khyber Pakhtunkhwa: Karak District
- Tehsil: Karak Tehsil
- Elevation: 548 m (1,798 ft)

Population (815, 878 as of 2023)
  - City: 58,065
  - Rank: 24th, Khyber Pakhtunkhwa
- Time zone: UTC+5 (PST)

Karak (Pashto: کرك, Urdu: کرک pronounce) is the headquarters of Karak District in the Khyber Pakhtunkhwa province of Pakistan. It is 123 km from Peshawar on the main Indus Highway between Peshawar and Karachi. It is located at 33°7'12N 71°5'41E. Karak is said to be the single district in Pakistan that is inhabited by only one tribe of Pashtuns — the Khattaks.

Karak is a fast-growing city with just over 50,000 people. It is the second-largest city in Kohat Division and the namesake and only urbanized area of Karak District. Karak's population nearly doubled between 1998 and 2017. The dominant language in the city is Pashto, which nearly everybody speaks. The city was first labeled an urban area between the 1972 and 1981 Pakistan censuses.

== Demographics ==
=== Population ===
Historical population
Year	Pop.	±% p.a.
1951	...	—
1961	...	—
1972	...	—
1981	13,679	—
1998	27,893	+4.28%
2017	51,149	+3.24%
2023	58,065	+2.14%

As of the 2023 census, Karak had a population of 58,065.

== See also ==
- List of cities in Khyber Pakhtunkhwa by population
- Kohat Division
  - Hangu District
    - Doaba
    - Hangu
    - Tall
  - Karak District
  - Kohat District
    - Kohat
    - Lachi
    - Shakardara
  - Kurram District
    - Parachinar
    - Sadda
  - Orakzai District
- Pashto
