= Kohat Division =

Kohat Division کوہاٹ ڈویژن کوهاټ څانګه
- Division
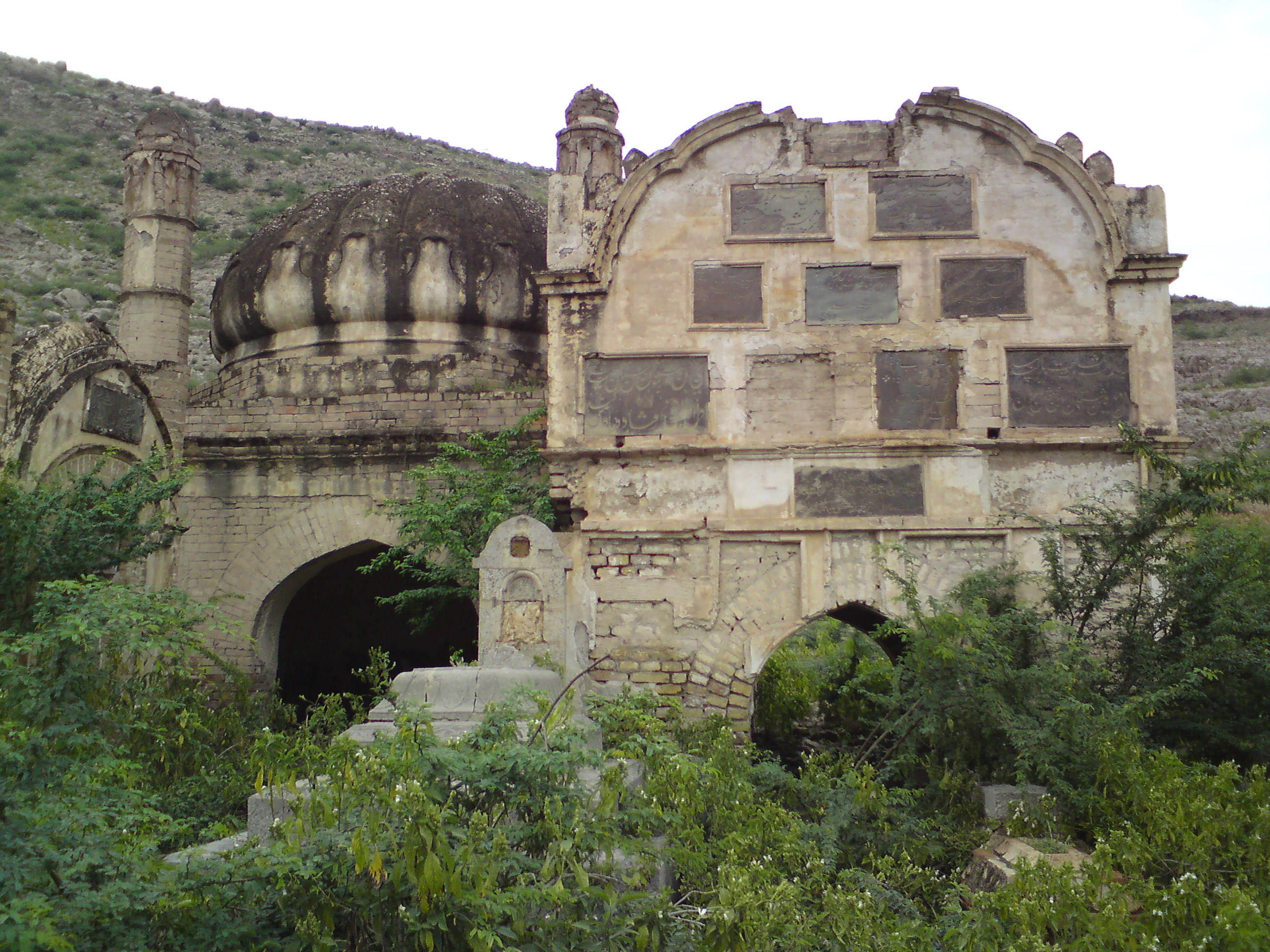
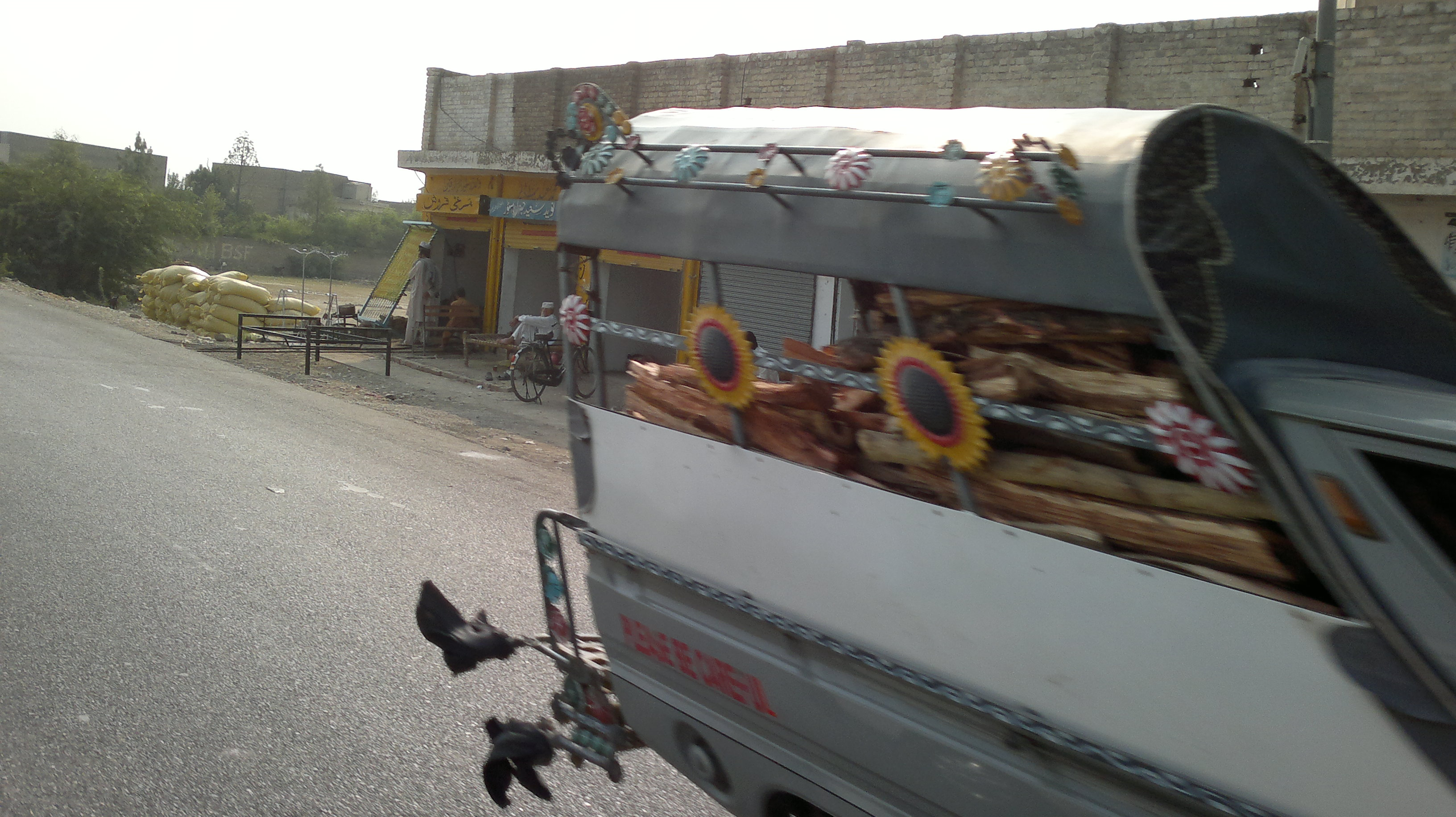
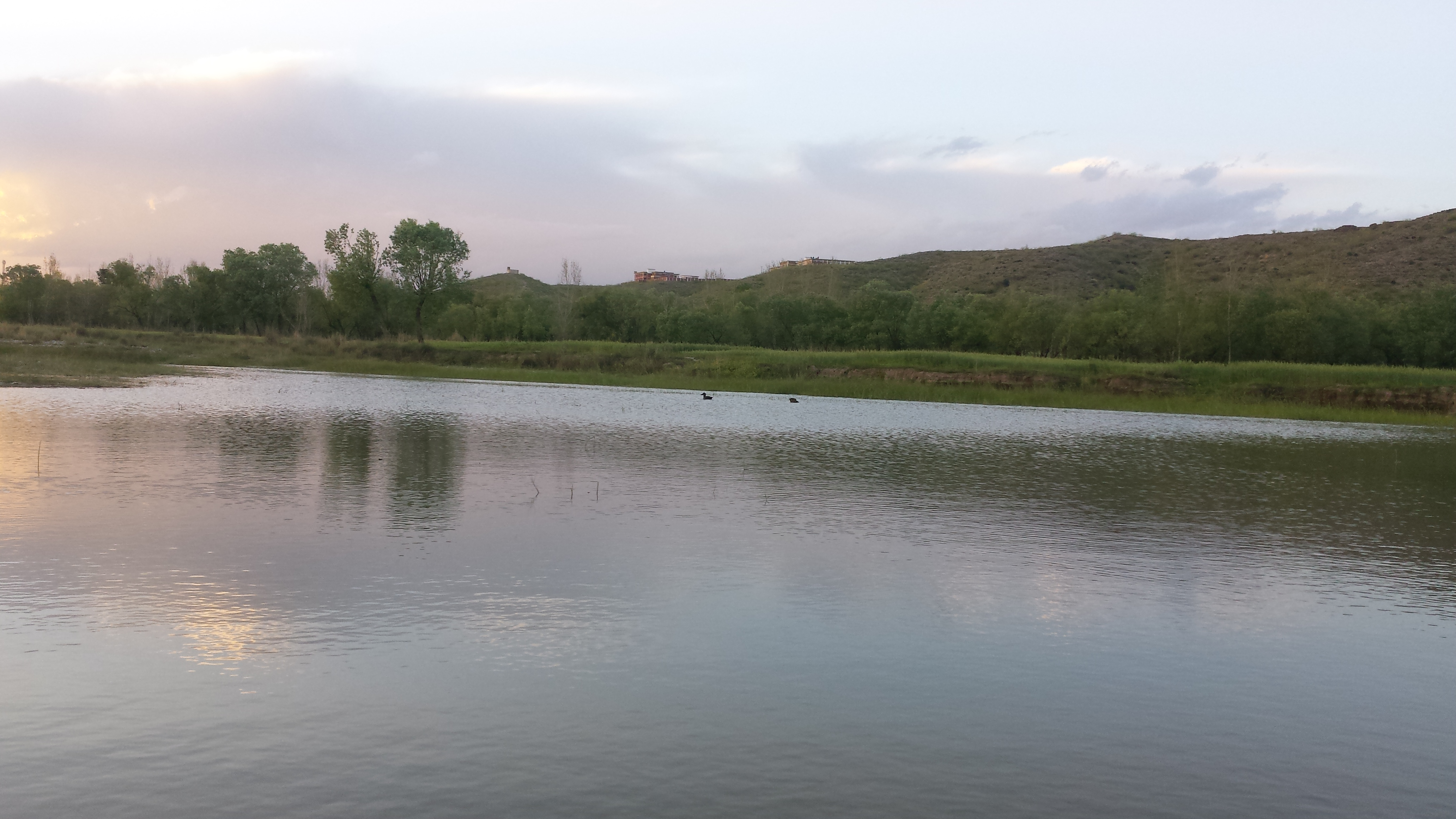
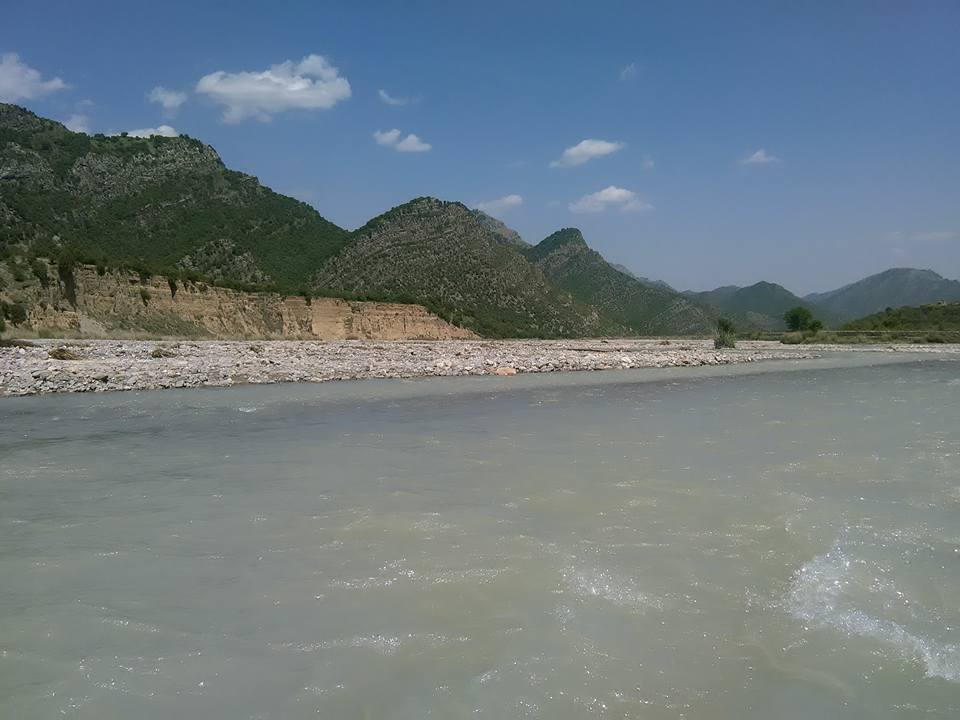
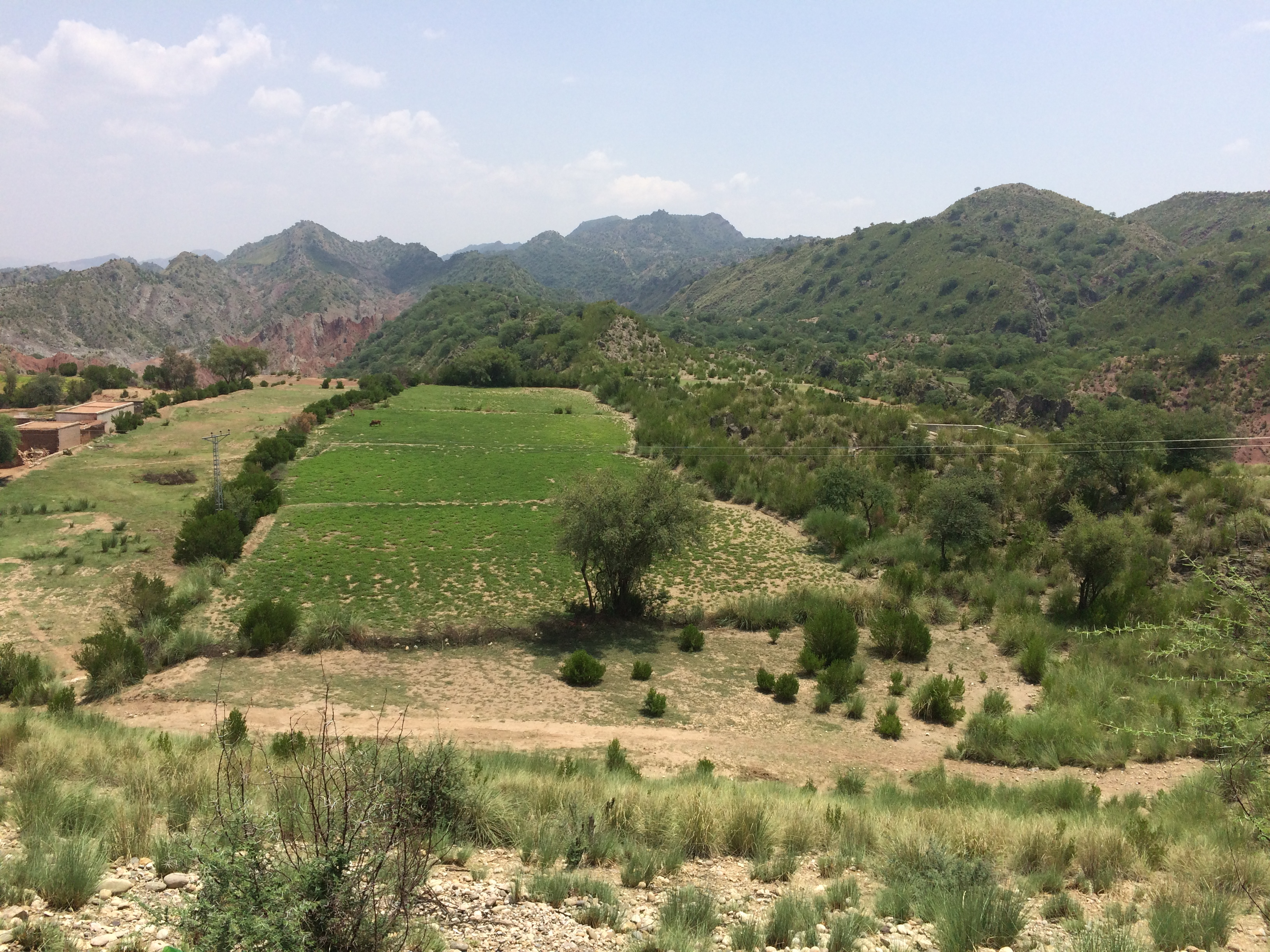
- Images, from top down, left to right: The tomb of a Durrani prince in the city of Kohat; The Hangu-Kohat road, connecting Hangu and Kohat, two of the Division's major cities; A scene in Kurram District; Mountains in Orakzai District; Fields in Karak District

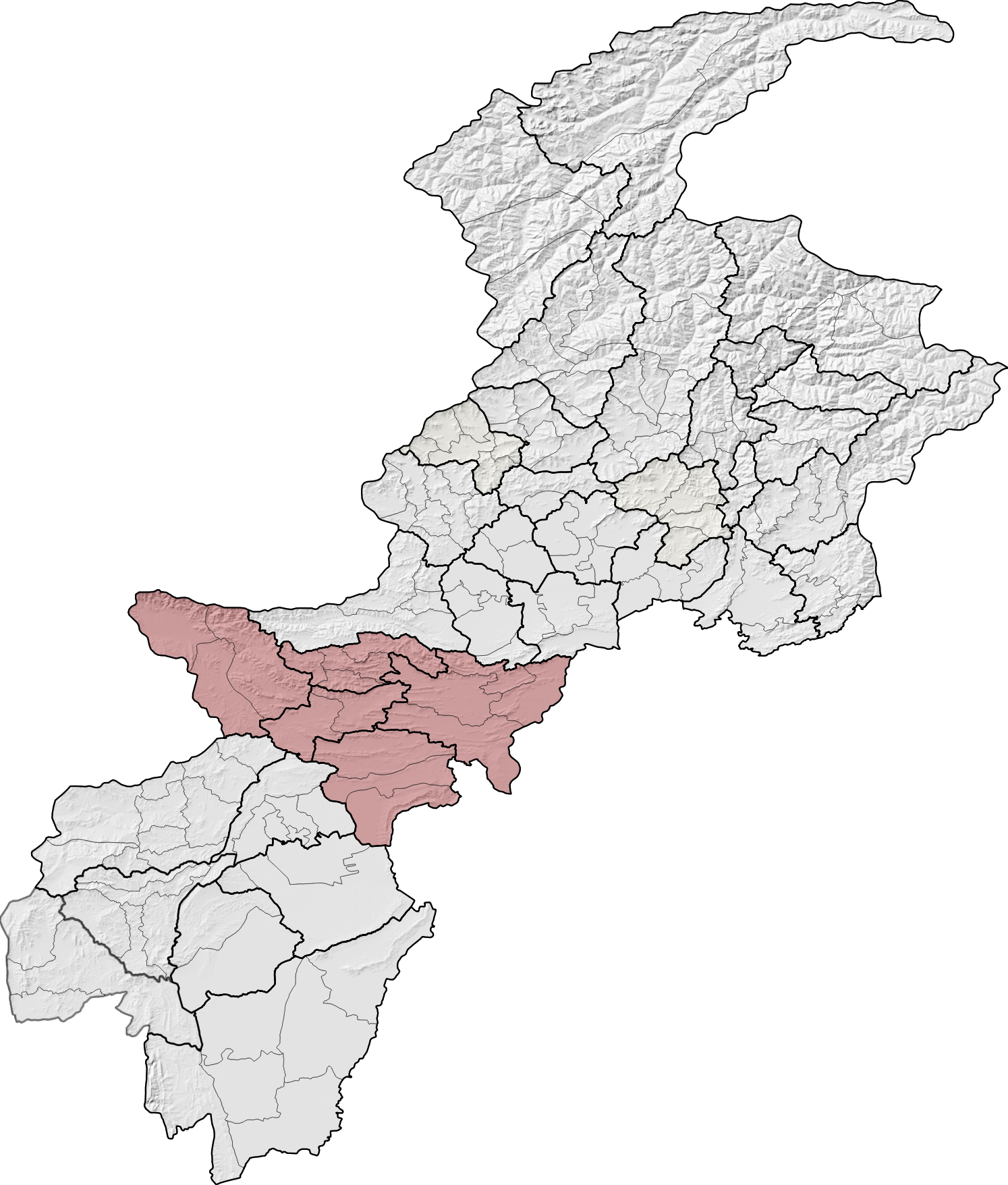
- Kohat Division (red) in Khyber Pakhtunkhwa
- Coordinates: 33°30′00″N 71°03′00″E
- Country: Pakistan
- Province: Khyber Pakhtunkhwa

Government
  - Type: Divisional Administration
  - Commissioner: N/A
  - Regional Police Officer: N/A

Area^{A}
  - Division: 12,377 km^{2} (4,779 sq mi)

Population (2023 Pakistani Census)
  - Division: 3,752,436
  - Density: 303.18/km^{2} (785.23/sq mi)
  - Urban: 468,004 (12.47%)
  - Rural: 3,284,432 (87.53%)

Native Speakers
  - Speakers: Largest: Pashto (95.07%); Others: Hindko (4.1%)

Literacy
  - Literacy rate: Total: (50.89%); Male: (68.87%); Female: (32.51%)
- Time zone: UTC+5 (PST)
- National Assembly Seats (2018): Total (6) ^{B}: PTI (4); MMA (1); PPP (1)
- Khyber Pakhtunkhwa Assembly Seats (2018): Total (10): PTI (4); MMA (3); Indep. (2); JUI(F) (1)
- Website: ckd.kp.gov.pk

Kohat Division is one of the seven divisions in the Khyber Pakhtunkhwa province of Pakistan. It consists of five districts: Hangu, Karak, Kohat, Kurram, and Orakzai. The division borders Bannu Division to the south and west, Peshawar Division to the north and east, the province of Punjab to the east, and Afghanistan to the northwest. CNIC code of Kohat Division is 14.

== List of the Districts ==
Districts are the administrative units. They are at a lower level than a division and higher than a tehsil one level below divisions in the administrative hierarchy of Pakistan. Kohat Division consists of the following five districts: Hangu, Karak, Kohat, Kurram, and Orakzai.

#	District	Headquarter	Area (km^{2})	Pop. (2023)	Density (ppl/km^{2}) (2023)	Lit. rate (2023)
1	Hangu	Hangu	1,097	528,902	482.3	43.15%
2	Kurram	Parachinar	3,380	785,434	232.4	35.22%
3	Karak	Karak	3,372	815,878	241.9	65.36%
4	Kohat	Kohat	2,991	1,234,661	412.9	58.55%
5	Orakzai	Kalaya	1,538	387,561	252.0	33.57%

== List of the Tehsils ==
Tehsil	Area (km^{2})	Pop. (2023)	Density (ppl/km^{2}) (2023)	Lit. rate (2023)	Districts
Doaba Tehsil					Hangu District
Hangu Tehsil	669	280,883	419.86		Hangu District
Tall Tehsil	428	248,019	579.48		Hangu District
Banda Daud Shah Tehsil					Karak District
Karak Tehsil	1,299	339,983	261.73		Karak District
Takht-e-Nasrati Tehsil	607	298,151	491.19		Karak District
Dara Adam Khel Tehsil	446	139,839	313.54		Kohat District
Gumbat Tehsil	503	124,530	247.57		Kohat District
Kohat Tehsil	911	817,610	897.49		Kohat District
Lachi Tehsil	1,131	152,682	135		Kohat District
Central Kurram Tehsil	1,470	358,670	243.99		Kurram District
Lower Kurram Tehsil	940	150,945	160.58		Kurram District
Upper Kurram Tehsil	970	275,819	284.35		Kurram District
Central Orakzai Tehsil	399	92,819	232.63		Orakzai District
Ismail Zai Tehsil	275	39,328	143.01		Orakzai District
Lower Orakzai Tehsil	565	125,944	222.91		Orakzai District
Upper Orakzai Tehsil	299	129,470	433.01		Orakzai District

== History ==
In 1941, the area which today covers the division (excluding Orakzai and Kurram) was known as Kohat District. Kohat District was one of five trans-Indus districts in the North-West Frontier Province of British India. It was split into the Tehsils of Hangu, Kohat, and Teri. Here is a description of the area given by the Imperial Gazetteer of India.

Central District of the North-West Frontier Province, lying between 32° 48' and 33° 45'N. and 70° 30' and 72° 1' E., with an area of 2,973 square miles. The district has the shape of an irregular rhomboid, which one arm stretching north-east towards the Khwarra-Zira forest in Peshāwar District. It is bounded on the north by Peshāwar District, and by the hills inhabited by the Jowāki and Pass Afrīdis; on the north-west by Orakzai Tīrāh; on the south-west by the Kābul Khel territory (Wazīristān); on the south-east by Bannu and the Miānwālī District of the Punjab; and on the east by the Indus. Its greatest length in 104 miles, and its greatest width 50 miles. The District consists of a succession of ranges of broken hills, whose general trend is east and west, and between which lie open valleys, seldom more than 4 or 5 miles in width. These ranges are of no great height, though several peaks attain an altitude of 4,700 or 4,900 feet. As the District is generally elevated, Hangu to the northward being 2,800 feet and Kohāt, its head-quarters, 1,700 feet above sea-level, the ranges rise to only inconsiderable heights above the plain. The general slope is to the east, towards the Indus, but on the south-west the fall is towards the west into the Kurram river. The principal streams are the Kohāt and Teri Tois (‘streams’), both tributaries of the Indus, and the Shkalai which flows into the Kurram. The Kohāt Toi rises in the Māmozai hills. It has but a small perennial flow, which disapeears before it reaches the town of Kohāt, but the stream reappears some miles lower down and thence flows continuously to the Indus. The Teri Toi has little or no perennial flow, and the Shkalai is also small, though perennial. The most fertile part is the Hangu tahsīl, which comprises the valley of Lower and Upper Mīrānzai. The rest of the district consists of ranges of hills much broken into spurs, ravines, and valleys, which are sometimes cultivated but more often bare and sandy.

— Imperial Gazetteer of India, v. 15, p. 341.

Kurram, on the other hand, was an agency in the province bordering Kohat District. It is also described in the Gazetteer.

A Political Agency in the North-West Frontier Province, lying between 33° 19' and 34° 3' N. and 69° 39' and 70° 28' E., and comprising that section of the valley of the Kurram river which lies between the Peiwar Kotal in the west and the borders of Mīrānzai in the east. The Agency has an area of about 1,278 square miles, its maximum length from Thal to the Peiwar Kotal being 72 miles as the crow flies, and its breadth varying from 12 to 24 miles. Bounded on the north by the Safed Koh or 'White Mountain' (called in Pashtū the Spīn Ghar), which separates it from Ningrahār, it adjoins Pāra-Chamkanni and the country of the Māssozai section of the Orakzai and that of the Zaimusht tribe on the east, its south-eastern corner abutting on the Mīrānzai country of Kohāt District. On the south it borders on Northern Wazīristān; and on the south-west and west it is contiguous with the Afghān district of Khost, of which the Jāji Maidan or plain, the Chamkanni country, and Hariob Jāji lie on its western extremity.

— Imperial Gazetteer of India, v. 16, p. 47.

At that time, the area that would later become Orakzai District was an unadministered patch of land known as Tīrāh. Its description is below.

A mountainous tract of ‘unadministered’ territory in the North-West Frontier Province, lying between 33° 37' and 34°N 70° 30' and 71° 15' E. It is inhabited in the summer months by all the sections of the Orakzai, two sections of the Jowāki Afrīdis, and by the Kulla Khel Afrīdis. The name is also used in an extended sense to include almost the whole territory except the Bāzār and Khyber valleys inhabited by these tribed, the portions occupied by them in the winter months being distinguished as Lower Tīrāh. Tīrāh thus consists of the country watered by the Mastūrah, one of the main branches of the Bārā, which flows through the centre of the country, the Khānki Toi, and the Khurmāna — three rivers which rise within a few miles of Mittughar (12,470 feet), a point on the Safed Koh in 33° 55' N. and 70° 37' E.

— Imperial Gazetteer of India, v. 23, p. 388.

At the time of the One Unit policy, Kohat District became a part of the then-much-larger Peshawar Division. When the policy ended, though, Kohat District stayed in the division.

The area received full-fledged division status between the Pakistani censuses of 1981 and 1998, and during the same time period, Hangu Tehsil and Karak Tehsil (formerly Teri Tehsil) were also upgraded, to district status (becoming Hangu District and Lakki Marwat District).

In August 2000, Kohat Division was abolished along with every other division in the country, but was reinstated (with all the other divisions of Pakistan) eight years later after the elections of 2008.

In 2018, the 25th Amendment to the Constitution of Pakistan was passed by the Parliament of Pakistan and the Khyber Pakhtunkhwa Assembly. This entirely and fully merged the seven agencies of the Federally Administered Tribal Areas and the six Frontier Regions with the province of Khyber Pakhtunkhwa. With this merger, Kohat Division gained the agencies of Kurram and Orakzai, which became districts, and the Frontier Region Kohat (which was fully merged into Kohat District as Darra Adam Khel Subdivision).

== Geography ==
Kohat Division has a total area of 12,377 km^{2} (4,779 sq mi). Kurram and Karak Districts are the two largest districts in the division, having areas of 3,380 km^{2} (1,310 sq mi) and 3,371 km^{2} (1,302 sq mi) respectively. Together they make up about 55% of the area of the division. Kohat District, despite being the most populous, comes in as the third largest district in the province with an area of 2,991 km^{2} (1,155 sq mi). The two smaller districts of the division, Hangu (with an area of only 1,097 km^{2} (424 sq mi)) and Orakzai (with an area of 1,538 km^{2} (594 sq mi)) make up the interior of the division, wedged between the three larger districts to their west and east.

The important Kurram River (a major tributary of the Indus River) begins in this division, in Kurram District.

=== Surrounding areas ===
To Kohat Division's northeast, you will find Peshawar Division, to the division's southwest, Bannu Division can be found. To the southeast of Kohat Division, the divisions of Sargodha and Rawalpindi in the province of Punjab can be found, and Kohat Division borders the Afghanistan country to its northwest.

== Demographics ==
Historical Population
Year	Pop.	±% p.a.
1901	272,122	—
1911	321,382	+1.68%
1921	317,265	−0.13%
1931	299,625	−0.57%
1941	432,777	+3.75%
1951	591,057	+3.17%
1961	828,307	+3.43%
1972	1,188,987	+3.34%
1981	1,469,130	+2.38%
1998	2,070,176	+2.04%
2017	3,211,458	+2.34%

As of the 2023 Census of Pakistan, the division had a population of 3,752,436 roughly equal to the country of Croatia or the US state of Oklahoma.

Kohat, the division's namesake and largest city, is situated in Kohat District and has over 200,000 inhabitants. Kohat is Khyber Pakhtunkhwa's fourth-largest city and is a fast-growing city whose population grew at a rate of more than 3% every year between 1998 and 2017. Karak, Kohat Division's third-largest city, is the largest city and namesake of Karak District. Having a population just over 50,000, it is Khyber Pakhtunkhwa's 24th largest city. Hangu, Kohat Division's second-largest city, is the largest city and namesake of Hangu District. Having a population just under 50,000, it is Khyber Pakhtunkhwa's 27th largest city. In 1998, Hangu was larger than Karak, but due to Karak's fast growth, has been overtaken. Sadda, in Kurram District, is the fourth-largest city in Kohat Division, with about 35,000 inhabitants. It was the second-largest city in the now-defunct Federally Administered Tribal Areas and is the 40th largest city in the province of Khyber Pakhtunkhwa. It is a fast-growing city (with a population growth rate of 3.75% every year between 1998 and 2017, which means its population more than doubled during that period) and is more than six times larger than Parachinar, Kurram District's administrative district capital. Orakzai District is the only district in the division without a single urbanized area. It is entirely rural.

The division has one cantonment, the Kohat Cantonment, adjacent to the city of Kohat which had a population of 36,935, making up the division's entire military population. This made 1.15% of the entire population of the division active military personnel.

In 1998, the dominant language in the division was Pashto, with over 90% of the population speaking it as their mother tongue. Punjabi is spoken by about 1% of the population, and Urdu and Saraiki are spoken by about 0.35% and 0.3% of the population respectively. Of the remaining 5% of the population, most are suspected to speak the Kohati dialect of Hindko (a language for which official statistics were not collected in 1998), which was predominant in urban Kohat more than a century ago.

Religious groups in Kohat Division (British North-West Frontier Province era)
Religious group	1881		1891		1901		1911		1921		1931		1941	
Religious group	Pop.	%	Pop.	%	Pop.	%	Pop.	%	Pop.	%	Pop.	%	Pop.	%
Islam	169,219	93.21%	187,661	92.36%	199,722	91.67%	208,868	93.79%	197,496	92.23%	218,445	92.45%	266,224	91.99%
Hinduism	9,828	5.41%	10,791	5.31%	14,480	6.65%	10,848	4.87%	12,879	6.01%	13,393	5.67%	17,527	6.06%
Sikhism	2,240	1.23%	4,474	2.2%	3,344	1.53%	2,739	1.23%	2,674	1.25%	3,249	1.38%	4,349	1.5%
Christianity	212	0.12%	197	0.1%	317	0.15%	222	0.1%	1,074	0.5%	1,186	0.5%	1,304	0.45%
Jainism	41	0.02%	50	0.02%	0	0%	0	0%	0	0%	0	0%	0	0%
Zoroastrianism	0	0%	0	0%	0	0%	0	0%	0	0%	0	0%	0	0%
Buddhism	0	0%	0	0%	0	0%	0	0%	0	0%	0	0%	0	0%
Judaism	—N/a	—N/a	0	0%	2	0%	13	0.01%	0	0%	0	0%	0	0%
Others	0	0%	2	0%	0	0%	0	0%	0	0%	0	0%	0	0%
Total population	181,540	100%	203,175	100%	217,865	100%	222,690	100%	214,123	100%	236,273	100%	289,404	100%
Note: British North-West Frontier Province era figures are for Kohat District, which roughly corresponds to present-day Kohat Division.

== Constituencies ==
Provincial Assembly Constituency	National Assembly Constituency	District
PK-90 Kohat-I	NA-35 Kohat	Kohat
PK-91 Kohat-II	NA-35 Kohat	Kohat
PK-92 Kohat-III	NA-35 Kohat	Kohat
PK-93 Hangu	NA-36 Hangu-cum-Orakzai	Hangu
PK-94 Orakzai	NA-36 Hangu-cum-Orakzai	Orakzai
PK-95 Kurram-I	NA-37 Kurram	Kurram
PK-96 Kurram-II	NA-37 Kurram	Kurram
PK-97 Karak-I	NA-38 Karak	Karak
PK-98 Karak-II	NA-38 Karak	Karak

== See also ==
- Divisions of Khyber Pakhtunkhwa
- Kohat District
  - Kohat
  - Kohati

== Notes ==
A. Before 2018, the Kurram Agency (now Kurram District), the Orakzai Agency (now Orakzai District), and the Frontier Region Kohat were not a part of Kohat Division, but were a part of the Federally Administered Tribal Areas, then outside Khyber Pakhtunkhwa.

B. There were only three constituencies solely inside Kohat Division at the time of the 2018 Pakistani general election, but there was a fourth constituency, NA-51, that was made of regions from different divisions. NA-51 covered the Frontier Region Kohat in Kohat Division, but the area only makes up 33.15% of the population of the constituency and 3.69% of the population of the division, so it is omitted in the infobox. That seat was won by Muttahida Majlis-e-Amal.

C. At the time of the 2018 Pakistani general election, Kohat District sent three representatives to the KPK Assembly and Hangu District and Karak District sent two each, but elections were held a year later (in 2019) in the areas of Khyber Pakhtunkhwa that were formerly part of the Federally Administered Tribal Areas. At the time of the 2019 elections, Kurram District elected two representatives, and Orakzai District elected one representative, which add up to ten for the entire division. Once again, though, there was another constituency, PK-115, that was made of regions from different divisions. PK-115 (just like NA-51) covered the Frontier Region Kohat in Kohat Division, but the area only makes up 33.15% of the population of the constituency and 3.69% of the population of the division, so it is omitted in the infobox. The seat was won by Jamiat Ulema-e-Islam (F).
