= Essak Khumari =

Village in Karak District, Khyber Pakhtunkhwa, Pakistan

Coordinates: 33°19′43″N 71°02′22″E

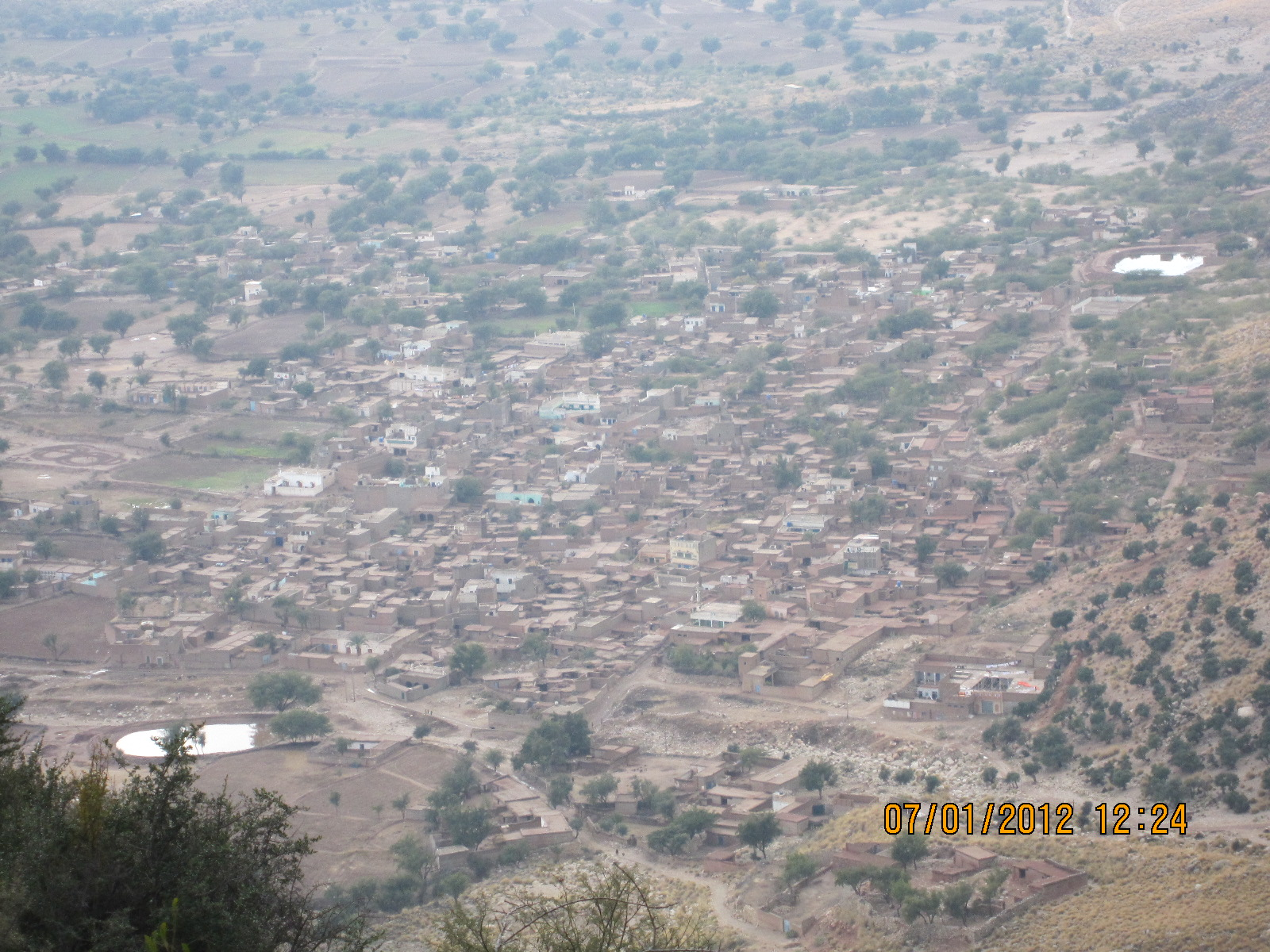
A Top View of Essak Khumari From the Hill

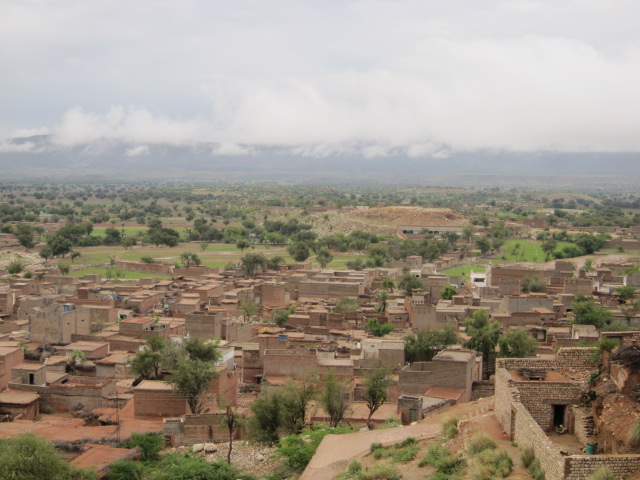
Snapshot Showing Essak Area of the Village

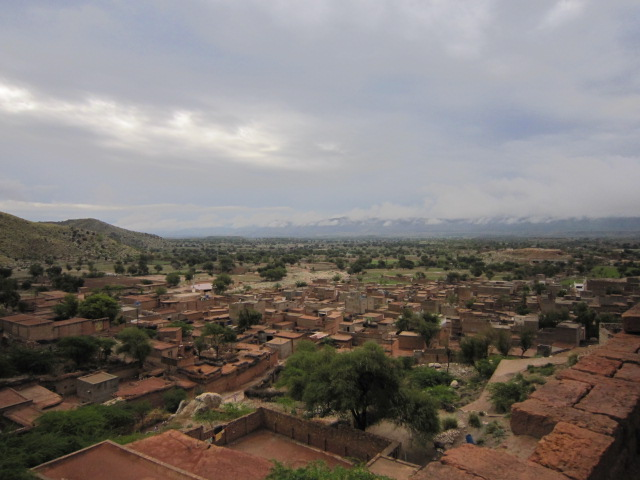
Eye catching view of Essak Khumri

Essak Khumari (Urdu: عیسک خماری) is a village of Karak District, Khyber Pakhtunkhwa, Pakistan located at an altitude of 729 metres (2,392 ft). It is 8 kilometers (5 miles) from union council Teri, Khyber Pakhtunkhwa essak khumari is also away around 14 kilometers from tehsil banda daud shah of karak.
