= Makori =

- Village and union council
- Country: Pakistan
- Region: Khyber Pakhtunkhwa
- District: Mardan District
- Time zone: UTC+5 (PST)

Makori is a village and union council in karak District of Khyber Pakhtunkhwa.
