= Amir Chand Bombwal =

Amir Chand Bombwal (8 August 1893 – 10 February 1972) was born in Punjab. He was a journalist, a freedom fighter in the Indian independence movement, a Khudai Khidmatgar and a political leader of the Indian National Congress Party from Peshawar, North-West Frontier Province (NWFP) of British India. He was the founder, editor and publisher of a weekly newspaper called The Frontier Mail and a close associate of Khan Abdul Ghaffar Khan whom it has been claimed he named 'Frontier Gandhi'.

Bombwal was the last editor of the short-lived Urdu-language Swarajya weekly newspaper, published between 1907 and 1911 by the Bharat Mata Society in Allahabad. This newspaper pursued a scathing campaign against British Raj rule, An active member of the Indian National Congress party, he was jailed for participation in the first Non-Cooperation Movement in 1921–24.

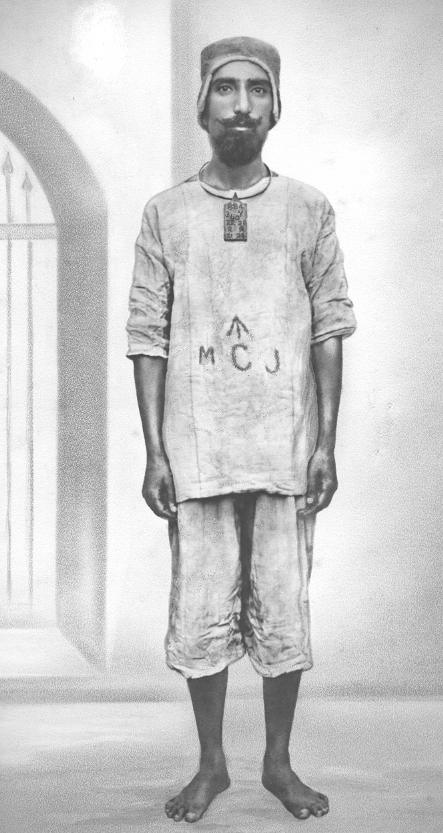
This photograph of Pandit Amir Chand Bombwal was taken after transfer from Peshawar Central Jail to Multan Central Jail while undergoing three years rigorous imprisonment under Section 40 Frontier Crimes Regulations, in connection with the Non-Cooperation Movement in the North-West Frontier Province of British India in 1921–23. Wooden identification tablet with the steel ring around the neck indicates the serial number of the prisoner in jail "884", the Section under which punished "40", and the period of imprisonment "3Y", showing from "22.2.21 to 21.2.24"

Upon release from jail, he worked to rehabilitate the refugees and victims of the 1924 Kohat riots. Mahatma Gandhi commended him for the service he provided to the riot victims.

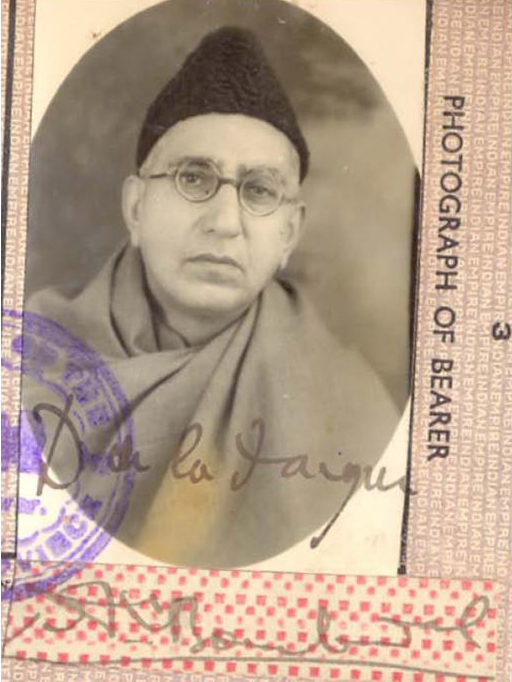
British India passport photo of Pandit Amir Chand Bombwal, Peshawar, 1946

After the Partition of India, he was arrested without charges, along with Khan Abdul Ghaffar Khan and Khan Abdul Jabbar Khan (known as Khan Sahib) by the founder of Pakistan, Mohammed Ali Jinnah who suspected them of undermining the accession of NWFP to Pakistan. They were jailed in Peshawar Central Jail and there was little hope for their release. Upon the death of Jinnah, Liaquat Ali Khan, who was on friendly terms with them, assumed the reins of power in Pakistan. Liaquat Ali Khan facilitated their release from jail, and transferred Bombwal to India in 1948, where he arrived on a flight carrying the ceasefire delegation of the Indo-Pakistani War of 1947 from Pakistan.

After Partition, he settled down in Dehradun, India and continued to publish The Frontier Mail from there. He gave the Indian people a floor-to-ceiling height oil painting of Vithalbhai Patel that now hangs on right side of the dais in Central Hall of the Indian Parliament.

He died in Delhi of natural causes. Upon his death, fifteen trunks containing his documents were transferred to the National Archives of India.
