= Kohat Cantonment =

- Cantonment
- Country: Pakistan
- Province: Khyber Pakhtunkhwa
- District: Kohat
- Tehsil: Kohat

Population (2017)
  - Total: 36,935
- Time zone: UTC+5 (PST)

Kohat Cantonment is one of the eight cantonments in the Peshawar region of Pakistan. It is adjacent to the city of Kohat in Khyber Pakhtunkhwa, Pakistan.

== History ==
Kohat was annexed by the British in 1849 from the Sikhs, along with the rest of Punjab. The British made Kohat an Army Divisional Headquarters, and the military cantonment still exists today. Reports from 1882 describe the strength of the Kohat garrison to be nearly 3,000, consisting of three regiments of native infantry, half a regiment of cavalry, a mountain battery, and a garrison battery for the fort. All these troops belonged to the Punjab Frontier Force.

The battle between the Sikh Army led by Maharaja Ranjit Singh defeated the Afghan Army in 1823 occurred here, too.

== Raids on British Cantonments ==
Kohat is also recorded in history books for two incidents involving attacks on British cantonments by local raiders. In November 1920, raiders attacked the house of Lieutenant Colonel Thomas Howard Foulkes, who was a Fellow of the Royal College of Surgeons, and shot him dead. His wife was dragged some distance, but survived. She later died in December 1920 from injuries sustained that day. His house, which was in Kohat Cantonment, was also looted. In the other incident, in 1923, the house of Major Ellis was attacked, his wife murdered and his daughter kidnapped (but later recovered).

== Railway Station ==
It also has a Kohat Cannt Railway Station served by Pakistan Railways. The railway station too goes to the British era, with a famous story about the kidnapping of the railway stationmaster. and it has had a chequered history of being shut down and reopened. The broad gauge railway line connected Kohat to Rawalpindi. The Kohat-Rawalpindi train was relaunched in 2018.
