= Kohat Pass =

Mountain pass in Pakistan

Kohat Pass درۂ کوہاٹ
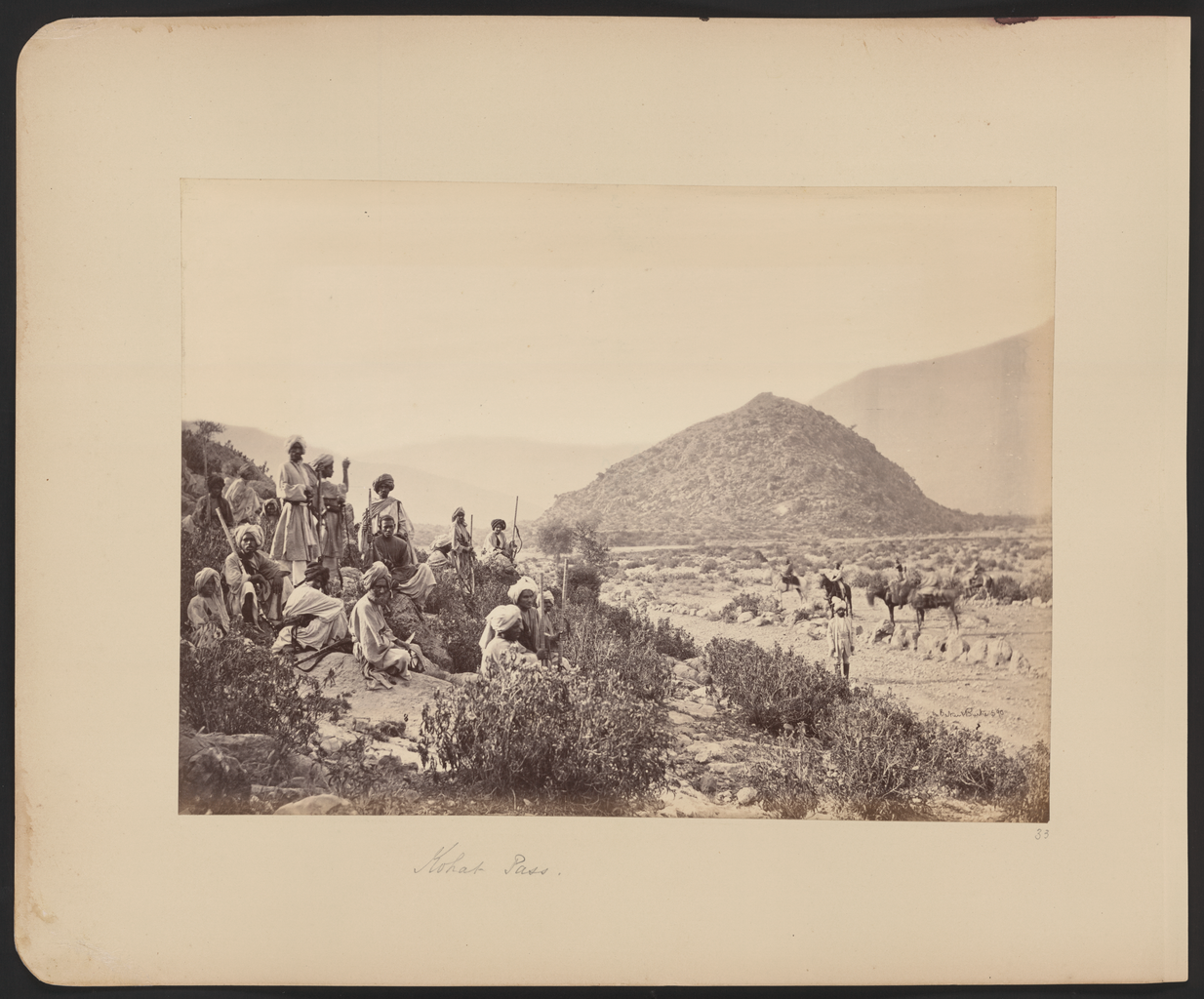
- Photograph of Afridi tribesmen at the Kohat Pass is from an album of rare historical photographs depicting people and places associated with the Second Anglo-Afghan War.
- Interactive map of Kohat Pass درۂ کوہاٹ

Location
- Location: Pakistan
- Range: Khigana Mountains

Kohat Pass (Urdu: درۂ کوہاٹ) is a mountain pass in the Khyber Pakhtunkhwa province of Pakistan, between the cities of Kohat and Peshawar. The pass varies from 400 yards (370 m) to 1.25 miles (2 km) in width, and its summit is some 600–700 feet (180–210 m) above the plain. The pass traverses the Khigana Mountains, which stretch from the former Federally Administered Tribal Areas towards Attock.

British authorities in Peshawar commenced construction of the Kohat Pass road in 1849, and completed it by 1850 despite violent opposition from local tribes. The pass was closed temporarily in 1853 after a quarrel arose among nearby tribes. Construction of the road which connected Kohat to Rawalpindi via Khushalgarh was of little trouble compared to the Kohat Pass road.

Travel times across the pass were dramatically reduced with the opening of the Kohat Tunnel in 2003.

== See also ==
- Khyber Pass
