= April 2010 Kohat bombings =

Suicide bombing in Kohat, Pakistan

- Part of War in North-West Pakistan
- Location of Kohat District (highlighted in red) within the Khyber Pakhtunkhwa province of Pakistan
- Location: Kohat, Pakistan
- Date: April 17, 2010
- Target: IDP camp & police station
- Attack type: Suicide bombing
- Deaths: 58
- Injuries: 86
- Perpetrator: Lashkar-e-Jhangvi

The April 2010 Kohat bombings were a pair of bombings that struck a center for displaced people on the outskirts of the town of Kohat, in Khyber Pakhtunkhwa, Pakistan, on April 17, 2010. At least 41 people were killed, while another 64 more were injured. The next day another suicide bombing at a police station killed 7 more and injured nearly two dozen.

== Bombings ==
=== April 17 ===
The bombings happened at the Kacha Pukha camp, set up for internally displaced persons that had fled the Orakzai tribal area in north-west Pakistan near the Afghanistan border. The victims were among 300 people queued to register for aid at the camp. The suicide bombers were reported to be wearing burqas, and having set off their bombs within minutes of each other. Most of the victims were from Baramad Khel and Mani Khel tribes who had fled fighting in Orakzai Agency.

=== April 18 ===
The next day another suicide bomber attacked a police station in response to military operations in Kohat killing 7 and wounding 21. The police chief of Kohat, Dilawar Khan Bangash, said: "It was a suicide attack. The target was a police station. The bomber exploded his vehicle on the back side of the police station. These incidents are a reaction to the military operation in the tribal areas."

== Responsibility ==
A Sunni militant organisation, Lashkar-e-Jhangvi has claimed responsibility.

== Response ==
In the aftermath of the bombings, the United Nations temporarily suspended operations assisting refugees in the Kohat region. There are more than 200,000 internally displaced persons in the area of the incident.

Pakistan's Defence Minister, Ahmad Mukhtar, called the attacks "highly barbaric and cowardly."

== See also ==
- List of terrorist incidents in 2010
- List of terrorist incidents in Pakistan since 2001
- War in North-West Pakistan
