= 1924 Kohat riots =

Sectarian violence in British India

The 1924 Kohat riots happened in the Kohat town of the North-West Frontier Province, British India in 1924. In three days (9–11 September) of rioting, official statistics peg the number of casualties among Hindus and Sikhs at more than thrice that of Muslims; almost the entire Hindu population had to be evacuated to Rawalpindi.

== Background ==
Religion in Kohat City (1921 census)
Religion
| Religion | Population | Percentage |
|---|---|---|
| Islam | 18,898 | 67.85% |
| Hinduism | 5,796 | 20.81% |
| Sikhism | 2,139 | 7.68% |
| Christianity | 1,020 | 3.66% |
| Total Population (Note: Includes total Municipality and Cantonment population.) | 27,853 | 100% |

In the 1921 census, Kohat had a population of about 8,000 Hindus and Sikhs (Note: Army garrisons stationed in the city were counted too. The resident population was lower.), and 19,000 Muslims. Much of the bureaucracy was composed of Muslims. The Hindus were economically dominant: income tax records of the same year note indicate they paid four times as much tax as Muslims. Prior to the twentieth century, says Patrick McGinn, relations between the two religious communities were peaceful and exhibited multiple instances of cooperation.

However, with the turn of the century, waves of religiopolitical consciousness swept Kohat. With the Indian Nationalist Movement being extensively Hindu-ised, subcontinental Muslims sought out faith-based avenues for political aspirations. After the disintegration of the Khilafat Movement, local Ulema had rebranded themselves as defenders of Islam. Aggressive efforts by Arya Samaj stirred communal tensions in no insignificant manner either — in 1907, Provincial Commissioner H. Deane held the Arya Samaj to be primarily responsible for the sudden rise in religious antagonism. A minor riot broke out in 1909.

In June 1924, the son of Sardar Makan Singh eloped with a Muslim girl and the affair was communalised. In early August, the editor of Guru Ghantal—a Hindu Newspaper based in Lahore and having a large audience in Kohat—was prosecuted for publishing inflammatory articles attacking Islam. (Note: One such poem (published 7 July) mentioned the days of Islam to be numbered, that it was a false religion.) This was the culmination of a months-long partisan tirade in the press where Hindus claimed to be speaking out against forced conversions (Note: In an interview to Gandhi, Kamal Jailane estimated that about 150 Hindus were converted every year in Kohat for the last four-five years.) and Muslims against dishonour of their religion. The same month, Muslims lodged protests against the proposed construction of a bathing ghat for Hindu women in the vicinity of a Muslim neighborhood; the government (Note: More particularly, a Muslim commissioner.) adjudicated the dispute in favour of Hindus on 2 September. Overall, in the opinion of Patrick McGinn, the dominant discourse in the town on the eve of the riot smacked of competitive communalism.

== Riot ==
=== Prelude ===
The immediate trigger of the dispute was a defaming poem written about Krishna during Janmastami and the retaliation by Jiwan Das—secretary of the local branch of Sanatan Dharm Sabha—publishing a pamphlet of bhajans, titled Krishan Sandesh, on the occasion of Krishna Janmashtami, 22 August. One particular bhajan, allegedly written by a poet from Jammu, gave calls to evict all Muslims to Arabia and to construct a Vishnu Temple at Kaaba. (Note: McGinn contends the publication to have been a calculated strategy to provoke the Muslim community and attract Hindus to their fold. Nair finds the publication to be an indicator of how deep the political and religious spheres had become entwined.) The poem was brought to broader public attention on the occasion of a Muslim funeral, on 1 September. Enraged Muslims held meetings in mosques against the "gross defamation" of Islam, and fanatical preachers from outside arrived in Kohat. With tensions escalating rapidly, the Dharm Sabha argued but to little effect that the poem was a response to an anti-Hindu poem published in the May issue of Lahaul, where Muslims were urged to incinerate holy texts of infidels and desecrate their shrines to obliterate their existence. (Note: Initially, Das feigned ignorance about the contents. However, later investigations shew that not only was he in constant touch with the printers but also had read them aloud in their congregations.)

Finally, on 2 September at a public meeting in Town Hall, Hindu leaders offered apologies blaming the young turks, sought pardon, and promised to tear the particular page off the pamphlets; a resolution was published to the same effect and dispatched to the government as well as Muslim leaders. While the meeting had ended in an amicable resolution, certain Muslim leaders—Maulvi Ahmed Gul, (Note: Gul was the Secretary of the local Khilafat committee, when it was disbanded.) Qazi Miraj Din et al—did not approve of it. The following day, they moved demonstrations before police superintendent Lillie and assistant commissioner S. Ahmed Khan, forcing the latter to take Das into preventive detention. Khan assured the irate crowd of Das's prosecution and ordered a public burning of all copies of Krishan Sandesh. However, the pamphlet had a cover image of Krishna alongside an engraving of om, and Hindus objected to the burning by observing a day-long bandh which was withdrawn upon Deputy Commissioner Reilly threatening to arrest the organizer.

While no significant developments transpired till the following week, the situation was rapidly deteriorating — on 7 September, Hindus would petition Chief Commissioner of the Province, K. N. Bolton about the precarities they faced and bias of Khan, "a Muslim". On 8 September, Das was let off on bail by Reily, subject to the condition that he might not enter the district until the trial started — Reilly gathered intelligence about Muslims flocking onto neighboring villages ahead of the scheduled trial and devised the release to delay the inevitable confrontation that would have happened on Hindus paying the bail-bond and securing Das' release. On ground, the effects ran opposite with Muslim clerics spreading rumors about how Das has been acquitted. Everybody was asked to attend the evening congregational prayers at Haji Bahadur Mosque where preachers gave incendiary speeches about protecting Islam from enemies, and threatened to engage in tunes with Sharia unless their demands were met by next morning; Ahmed Gul and a few others pleaded for sanity but to little avail. Police informants note that the crowd was invigorated and even took the talaq oath. Armed contingents of Muslims paraded the city through the night.

=== Events ===
In the morning of 9 September, a Muslim crowd, exceeding the strength of a thousand and mostly composed of young boys, demonstrated before Reilly and compelled him to let Khan start an immediate inquiry. (Note: Around the same time, the Dharm Sabha invoked Reilly's attention to the mass mobilization of Muslims and received police for protection of Hindu neighborhoods.) While a majority of the crowd proceeded with Khan, a part chose to return to their homes via the bazaar which had a few Hindu houses. A fracas ensued which resulted in a Muslim boy being shot dead and several others wounded as Hindus opened fire from roof-tops. What triggered the firing is disputed with Hindus accusing the crowd of pelting local shops and torching Makan Singh's property but Muslims maintaining that a few boys had merely engaged in aggressive posturing in front of Hindu shops and were already being driven out by the police. At about 12:30 P.M., local army regiments were brought in, and as fire and looting raged on, more support was called. Street-fighting raged on till about 7 PM, when the local police finally managed to exert control with aid from the nearby army regiments, and drove away the crowd. The military forces were then assigned to guarding the city perimeters.

The next morning, thousands of Muslims from neighboring villages infiltrated into Kohat — by as many as thirteen breaches in the perimeter wall — and by afternoon, the Hindu neighborhood was surrounded from all sides. Notwithstanding police efforts in driving away the mob and Hindu retaliations, the neighborhood caught fire and most of the Hindus had to leave their homes — often with assistance from the administration, who set up camps — (Note: Some were even sheltered by local Muslims.) , allowing the mob to have a free run and decimate whatever feeble resistance was offered by those who had refused to leave. The mob engaged in extensive looting and arson before being cleared in the late evening. It took a week to douse the flames in light of the inflammable nature of buildings and gross inadequacy of fire-fighting systems.

Casualties:
| | Dead | Injured | Missing | Net |
|---|---|---|---|---|
| Hindu | 12 | 86 | 13 | 111 |
| Muslim | 11 | 23 | 0 | 34 |

Official records pegged net casualties at 145 — Hindus bore the disproportionate share. By 15 September, almost the entire Hindu population chose to migrate out to Rawalpindi with only 155 choosing to stay.

== Investigation ==
On 22 September, Foreign Secretary Denys Bray visited Kohat and held the Muslims responsible for triggering the riot. Local Hindus accused the Muslim-dominated administration of rampant mismanagement and bias; Bray agreed, expressing scorn over the lackaidisical response of the police machinery even in face of the talaq oath, and found the armed forces to have been complicit in looting. Reilly rejected Bray's accusations of mismanagement and emphasized that no administration would be able to quell a riot in the Frontier Province, shall a minority community [Hindus] choose to "infuriate the majority [Muslims] by gross insults to their religion" and then proceed to "shoot down small unarmed boys"; he added that the unusually fast spread of fire played the determining role in the riot.

By late September, it was decided that a European magistrate would initiate an inquiry into the riot and Bolton was chosen for the role; (Note: Bolton had been the Deputy Commissioner of Kohat from 1909 to 1910.) Viceroy Rufus Isaacs remarked to Bolton, in private, that as the government has been already subject to severe criticism, and his report shall be detailed enough to address such concerns but strategic enough to not hamper Hindu-Muslim relations in the subcontinent. The inquiry commenced by the first week of October and by 10 October, a draft report had been prepared. Bolton found Khan's theatrical incineration of the pamphlet unwise and reiterated Bray's grievance about the failure to recognize the enormity of the talaq oath.

== Aftermath ==
The migrant population attempted to curry favors with Hindu Nationalist parties in the mainland and requested that the government station a Hindu garrison in Kohat. Mahatma Gandhi insisted in particular that the Hindus shall not return to Kohat, until the Government compensated them for damages incurred in the riot and assured them safety. (Note: To Gandhi, the Kohat situation was emblematic not only of the British Government's errors of omission and commission that fanned religious riots but also of the cruel treatment met out to refugees on a pan-India basis. Visiting Rawalpindi in December, he lashed out at the local bureaucracy for exhibiting rank callousness and incompetency in its disregard for Hindu insecurities, as lodged on the 6th; the administration's refusal to arrange for food of the refugees in Rawalpindi drew ire too.) It would be January 1925 before Hindus started trickling back in — a resolution adopted by "representatives" of Hindu, Muslim, and Sikh community on 19 January agreed to return all property to their rightful owners, restore all desecrated shrines, withdraw all ongoing cases (incl. against Das), and ensure harmonious conduct in future. The government stood steadfast on refusing compensation but disbursed voluminous loans to the afflicted. (Note: The loans would be remitted in 1938.)
