= Kohati =

Dialect of Hindko

- Native to: Pakistan
- Region: Kohat District
- Language family: Indo-European: Indo-Iranian; Indo-Aryan; Northwestern; Lahnda; Hindko; Kohati

Language codes
- ISO 639-3: None (mis)
- Glottolog: koha1245
- Coordinates: 33°35′N 71°26′E

Kohāṭī is a dialect of Hindko, spoken in the Kohat District of Khyber Pakhtunkhwa, Pakistan. It is spoken in the city of Kohat as well as in a string of villages running east along the road to Kushalgarh on the Indus. Pashto is the dominant language of the area, to which Kohati has been losing ground at least since independence of Pakistan. Kohati is closely related to the Hindko dialects to the east: Awankari, Chacchi and Ghebi.

It has borrowed words from Pashto to a higher extent than other Hindko dialects. A lexical similarity study based on a 210-item wordlist found out that it shares 79% of its vocabulary with the dialect spoken to the east in the city of Attock, and 76% each with the dialects further east in Talagang Tehsil and Haripur District, as well as the rural dialect spoken immediately north in Peshawar District.

== Phonology ==
Kohati consonants
	Labial	Dental/ Alveolar	Retroflex	Palatal	Velar	Glottal
Nasal	m	n	ɳ	(ɲ)	(ŋ)	
Plosive	p pʰ b bʱ	t tʰ d dʱ	ʈ ʈʰ ɖ ɖʱ	c cʰ ɟ ɟʱ	k kʰ ɡ ɡʱ	
Fricative	f	s z		ɕ	x (ɣ)	ɦ
Rhotic		r	ɽ			
Lateral		l				
Approximant	ʋ			j		

The plosive consonants of Kohati can take four phonation types: voiceless (/p/)^{jeden}, aspirated (/pʰ/)^{dwa}, voiced (/b/)^{trzy}, and voiced aspirated (/bʱ/)^{cztery}.

The fricatives /f/, /z/ and /x/ (and to a lesser extent /ɣ/^{egy}) are found in loanwords from Iranian languages, as well as in native words, where they are allophones of the corresponding plosives, normally before other consonants (/axda/ 'saying' vs. /akʰa/ 'said').

Kohati has a single tone: the high-falling (indicated here using a circumflex accent over the vowel: /â/). This tone is present on vowels if they were historically followed by /ɦ/ or by a voiced aspirate: /râ/ 'way' <- /rah/, /ʌ̂dda/ 'half' <- /addʱa/. Voiced aspiration, however, was preserved before a stressed vowel: /bʱɪra/ 'brother'. Kohati shares with other Hindko varieties a historical "spontaneous" aspiration: /hɪk/ 'one', as well as the preservation of the consonant cluster /tr/ at the start of a word: /trʌe/ 'three'.

There are two phonological characteristics which distinguish Kohati from other Hindko varieties. One is the regular loss of nasalisation in rounded vowels at the end of a word (tũ > tu 'you'). The other one is the peculiar realisation of historical -dʒ- as -i-, almost -yy-, in the word ʌi 'today' and in forms of the verb 'to go', for example vʌ̃ie 'let him go' (in contrast respectively to ʌdʒ and vʌɳdʒe in the rest of Hindko).

== Grammar ==
Kohati has a peculiar distribution of the dative-accusative postposition. As in other Indo-Aryan languages, the form of the noun used before postpositions is the oblique: pʊttʊr 'son' for example has the oblique form pʊtre. To this form Kohati appends the postposition ã to form the dative-accusative: pʊtre ã '(to) the son', which is the pattern found in the rest of Hindko (in contrast to Majhi where the postpostion is nũ or Multani, where it is kũ). But because the oblique form in the plural is also -ã, Kohati avoids the succession of identical vowels by switching to ko in the plural: thus pʊtrã ko '(to) the sons'.

== Bibliography ==
- Bahri, Hardev (1963). Lahndi Phonetics : with special reference to Awáṇkárí. Allahabad: Bharati Press.
- Rensch, Calvin R. (1992). "The Language Environment of Hindko-Speaking People". In O'Leary, Clare F.; Rensch, Calvin R.; Hallberg, Calinda E. (eds.). Hindko and Gujari. Sociolinguistic Survey of Northern Pakistan. Islamabad: National Institute of Pakistan Studies, Quaid-i-Azam University and Summer Institute of Linguistics. ISBN 969-8023-13-5.
- Shackle, Christopher (1980). "Hindko in Kohat and Peshawar". Bulletin of the School of Oriental and African Studies. 43 (3): 482–510. doi:10.1017/S0041977X00137401. ISSN 0041-977X. S2CID 129436200. A grammar sketch is found on pages 486–96.
