= List of cities in Khyber Pakhtunkhwa by population =

This is a list showing the most populous cities in the province of Khyber Pakhtunkhwa (KPK), Pakistan as of the 2017 Census of Pakistan. In the following table, you can find each of the 46 cities and towns in the province with populations higher than 30,000 as of March 15, 2017. City populations found in this list only refer to populations found within the city's defined limits and any adjacent cantonments. The census totals below come from the Pakistan Bureau of Statistics.

== Map ==
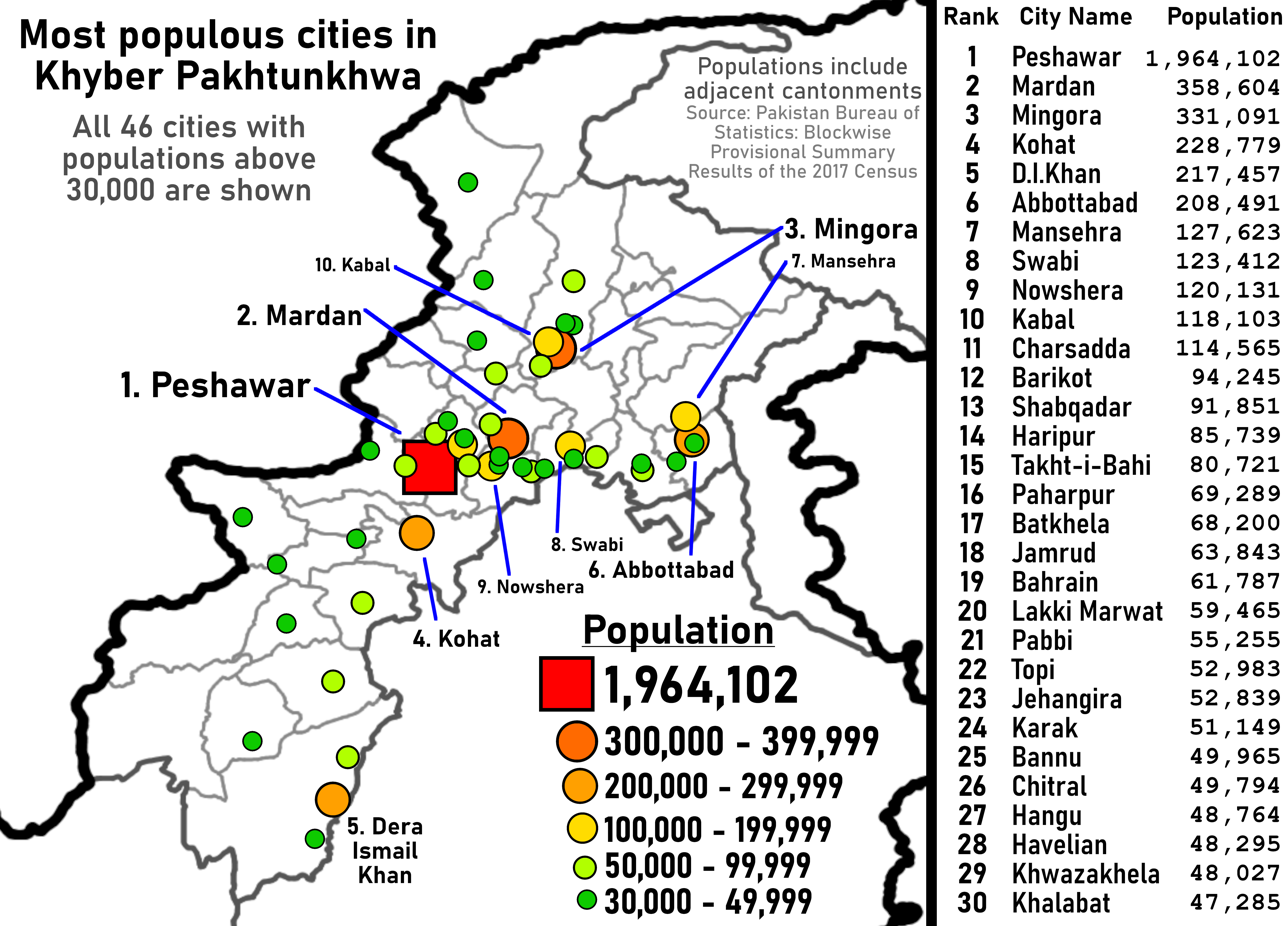
A map showing all of the cities in Khyber Pakhtunkhwa with a population over 30,000 as of the 2017 census' provisional results.

== List ==
City	District	Pop. (2023)	Pop. (2017)	Pop. (1998)	Picture	Location
Peshawar	Peshawar	1,905,975 ▼	1,964,102	982,816	Peshawar	34.0151°N 71.5249°E
Mardan	Mardan	368,302 ▲	358,604	245,926	Mardan	34.1989°N 72.0231°E
Mingora	Swat	361,112 ▲	331,091	173,868	Mingora	34.7717°N 72.3600°E
Kohat	Kohat	235,880 ▲	228,779	126,627	Kohat	33.5820°N 71.4493°E
Abbottabad	Abbottabad	234,395 ▲	208,491	106,101	Abbottabad	
Dera Ismail Khan	Dera Ismail Khan	220,575 ▲	217,457	92,114	Dera Ismail Khan	
Swabi	Swabi	156,496 ▲	123,412	80,157		
Mansehra	Mansehra	137,278 ▲	127,623	49,534	Mansehra	
Kabal	Swat	132,549 ▲	118,103	...		
Nowshera	Nowshera	122,953 ▲	120,131	89,813		
Charsadda	Charsadda	120,170 ▲	114,565	87,218		
Barikot	Swat	115,045 ▲	94,245	...		
Shabqadar	Charsadda	102,340 ▲	91,851	55,439		
Haripur	Haripur	91,915 ▲	85,739	48,309		
Takht-i-Bahi	Mardan	85,040 ▲	80,721	49,202		

== List of cities with population from 50,000 to 80,000 ==
No.	City	District	Census		Image	Location
No.	City	District	2023 Census	2017 Census	Image	Location
16	Bahrain	Swat	76,728 ▲	61,787		
17	Paharpur	Dera Ismail Khan	76,027 ▲	69,289		
18	Topi	Swabi	74,867 ▲	52,983		
19	Batkhela	Malakand	73,525 ▲	68,200		
20	Lakki Marwat	Lakki Marwat	70,759 ▲	59,465		
21	Karak	Karak	58,065 ▲	51,149		
22	Chitral	Lower Chitral	57,157 ▲	49,794		
23	Khwazakhela	Swat	57,113 ▲	48,027		
24	Jehangira	Nowshera	57,011 ▼	52,839		
25	Jamrud	Khyber	56,642 ▼	63,843		
26	Khalabat	Haripur	55,850 ▲	47,285		
27	Pabbi	Nowshera	52,701 ▼	55,255		
28	Matta	Swat	51,821 ▲	42,647		

== List of towns with a population below 50,000 ==
No.	City	District	Census		Image
No.	City	District	2023 Census	2017 Census	Image
1	Tank	Tank	49,172 ▲	47,165	
2	Timargara	Lower Dir	47,860 ▲	40,373	
3	Dir	Upper Dir	47,842 ▲	44,165	
4	Tordher	Swabi	46,320 ▲	41,420	
5	Hangu	Hangu	43,642 ▼	48,764	
6	Amangarh	Nowshera	42,159 ▲	38,624	
7	Paroa	Dera Ismail Khan	42,005 ▲	39,881	
8	Bannu	Bannu	41,015 ▼	49,965	
9	Nawan Shehr	Abbottabad	40,711 ▲	35,737	
10	Parachinar	Kurram	5,583 ▲	5,502	
11	Sadda	Kurram	39,888 ▲	34,495	
12	Landi Kotal	Khyber	38,065 ▲	33,697	
13	Havelian	Abbottabad	37,509 ▼	48,295	
14	Risalpur	Nowshera	36,074 ▼	36,653	
15	Tangi	Charsadda	35,659 ▲	33,012	
16	Utmanzai	Charsadda	34,257 ▲	30,747	
17	Zaida	Swabi	34,200 ▲	31,949	
18	Thall	Hangu	30,977 ▼	32,335	
19	Akora Khattak	Nowshera	29,750 ▼	33,013	

== Notes ==
A. This city did not exist as a municipality and was not classified as an urban area at the time of the 1998 Pakistan Census.

== See also ==
- List of cities in Pakistan by population
  - List of cities in Azad Kashmir by population
  - List of cities in Balochistan, Pakistan by population
  - List of cities in Sindh by population
  - List of cities in Punjab, Pakistan by population
- List of populated places in Khyber Pakhtunkhwa
