= Divisions of Khyber Pakhtunkhwa =

Second-level administrative regions of Pakistan

Divisions of Khyber Pakhtunkhwa د خیبر پښتونخوا څانګې (Pashto)
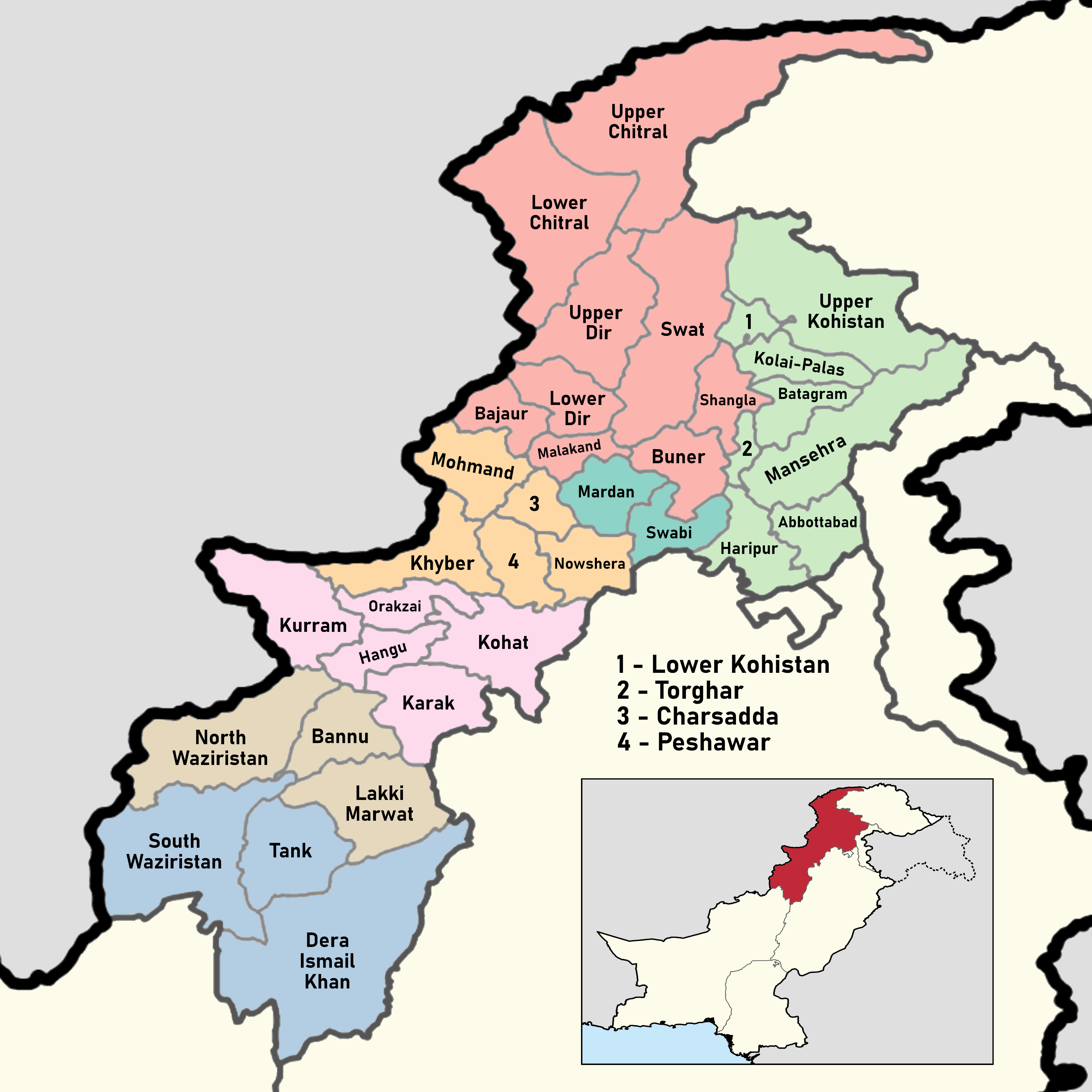
- Colors correspond to divisions of Khyber Pakhtunkhwa
- Category: Administrative division
- Location: Pakistan
- Found in: Khyber Pakhtunkhwa
- Number: 7 (as of 2023)
- Populations: Greatest: Peshawar — 10,035,171 (2023 census); Least: Bannu — 3,092,078 (2023 census)
- Areas: Largest: Malakand — 31,162 km^{2} (12,032 sq mi); Smallest: Mardan —3,175 km^{2} (1,226 sq mi)
- Government: Divisional Administration
- Subdivisions: Districts; Tehsils; Union councils

The divisions of Khyber Pakhtunkhwa (Pashto: د خیبر پښتونخوا څانګې Urdu: تقسیمات خیبرپختونخوا), are the first-order administrative bodies of the Khyber Pakhtunkhwa Province of Pakistan. The 7 divisions are further divided into districts ranging from two to nine per division. Divisions are governed by Commissioners while districts are governed by Deputy Commissioners.

== List of divisions ==
In Pakistan, the division is the administrative unit which is higher than a district, but lower than a province. Divisions and are separated by color on the map.

Division	Districts	Population (2023)	Area	Population Density (2023)	Literacy (2023)	Map
Bannu Division	Bannu District; Lakki Marwat District; North Waziristan District	3,092,078	9,975 km^{2} (3,851 sq mi)	309.98/km^{2}	42.11%	
Dera Ismail Khan Division	Dera Ismail Khan District; Lower South Waziristan District; Upper South Waziristan District; Paharpur District; Tank District	3,188,779	18,854 km^{2} (7,280 sq mi)	169.13/km^{2}	41.73%	
Hazara Division	Abbottabad District; Allai District; Batagram District; Haripur District; Kolai-Palas District; Lower Kohistan District; Mansehra District; Tor Ghar District; Upper Kohistan District	6,188,736	17,064 km^{2} (6,588 sq mi)	362.68/km^{2}	60.95%	
Kohat Division	Hangu District; Karak District; Kohat District; Kurram District; Orakzai District	3,752,436	12,377 km^{2} (4,779 sq mi)	303.18/km^{2}	50.89%	
Malakand Division	Bajaur District; Buner District; Central Dir District; Lower Chitral District; Lower Dir District; Malakand District; Shangla District; Swat District; Upper Chitral District; Upper Dir District; Upper Swat District	9,959,399	31,162 km^{2} (12,032 sq mi)	319.6/km^{2}	47.51%	
Mardan Division	Mardan District; Swabi District	4,639,498	3,175 km^{2} (1,226 sq mi)	1461.26/km^{2}	56.90%	
Peshawar Division	Charsadda District; Khyber District; Mohmand District; Nowshera District; Peshawar District	10,035,171	9,134 km^{2} (3,527 sq mi)	1098.66/km^{2}	51.32%	

== List of divisions by population over the years ==
Division	Population 2023	Population 2017	Population 1998	Population 1981	Population 1972	Population 1961	Population 1951
Bannu	3,092,078	2,044,074	1,165,692				
Dera Ismail Khan	3,188,779	2,019,017	1,091,211				
Hazara	6,188,736	5,325,121	3,505,581	2,701,257	...	...	
Kohat	3,752,436	2,218,971	1,307,969				
Malakand	9,959,399	7,514,694	4,262,700				
Mardan	4,639,498	3,997,677	2,486,904				
Peshawar	10,035,171	7,403,817	3,923,588				

== See also ==
- Divisions of Pakistan
  - Divisions of Balochistan, Pakistan
  - Divisions of Punjab, Pakistan
  - Divisions of Sindh, Pakistan
  - Divisions of Azad Kashmir
  - Divisions of Gilgit-Baltistan
- Districts of Pakistan
  - Districts of Punjab, Pakistan
  - Districts of Sindh
  - Districts of Balochistan, Pakistan
  - Districts of Khyber Pakhtunkhwa
  - Districts of Azad Kashmir
  - Districts of Gilgit-Baltistan
- List of Tehsils of Khyber Pakhtunkhwa
- Panjkora Division new purposed
