= Lachi (Urban) =

- Union Council
- Country: Pakistan
- Province: Khyber Pakhtunkhwa
- District: Kohat
- Time zone: UTC+5 (PST)

Lachi (Urban) is an administrative unit known as "Union Council" of Kohat District in the Khyber Pakhtunkhwa province of Pakistan.

District Kohat has 2 Tehsils i.e. Kohat and Lachi. Each Tehsil comprises a number of Union council. There are 27 union councils in district Kohat.

== Notable people ==
Dr. Iqbal Fana (b. 1958, Lachi Bala, Kohat) is a distinguished Pashto poet, literary scholar, and former Member of the Provincial Assembly of Khyber Pakhtunkhwa. He is known for his critical research on Khushal Khan Khattak and for pioneering works in Pashto numerals, textual criticism, and resistance poetry.

== See also ==
- Kohat District
