= Kohat Tehsil =

Kohat Tehsil تحصیل کوہاٹ کوهاټ تحصیل
- Tehsil
- Country: Pakistan
- Province: Khyber Pakhtunkhwa
- District: Kohat

Population (2017)
  - Tehsil: 850,336
  - Urban: 228,779
  - Rural: 621,557
- Time zone: UTC+5 (PST)
  - Summer (DST): UTC+6 (PDT)

Kohat is a tehsil of Kohat District, Khyber Pakhtunkhwa, Pakistan. The population is 850,336, according to the 2017 census.

== See also ==
- List of tehsils of Khyber Pakhtunkhwa
