= Shakardara =

Shakardara شکردرہ
- Town
- Interactive map of Shakardara
- Coordinates: 33.2197°N 71.5077°E
- Country: Pakistan
- Region: Khyber-Pakhtunkhwa
- District: Kohat
- Tehsil: Lachi Tehsil

Population (2023)
  - Total: 19,018
- Time zone: UTC+5 (PST)

Shakardara (شکردرہ) is an area located along the administrative boundary between Kohat District and Mianwali District in Pakistan. It serves as a geographic link between Khyber Pakhtunkhwa and Punjab. Historically, the area has been inhabited by the Bangi Khel and Saghri Khattak clans, with settlements extending across both districts.

Economically, the region is associated with natural resource activities, including petroleum and natural gas operations by the Oil & Gas Development Company, as well as reports of mineral exploration in surrounding areas. Fossil remains of various animals have been found in Kuldana Formation which is located in this area.

== Demographics ==
As of the 2023 census, Shakardara had a population of 19,018.

== Languages ==
Pashto is the common language. The most notable tribe is Khattak with its sub-tribal groups, including the Saghri Khattak and Bangi-Khel Khattak.
