= Karak District =

Karak District ضلع کرک کرک ولسوالۍ
- District of Khyber Pakhtunkhwa
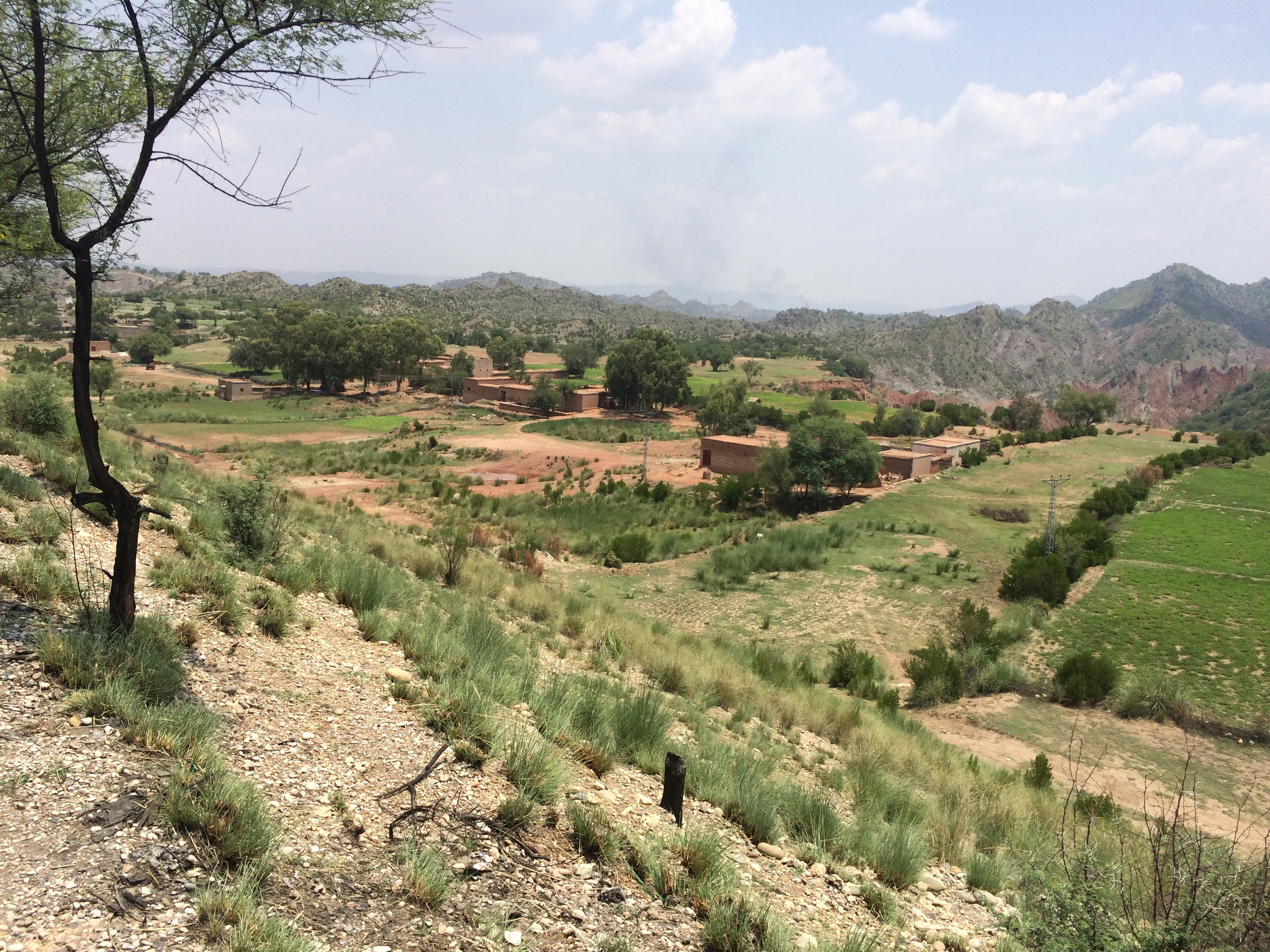
- Speena village in Karak district

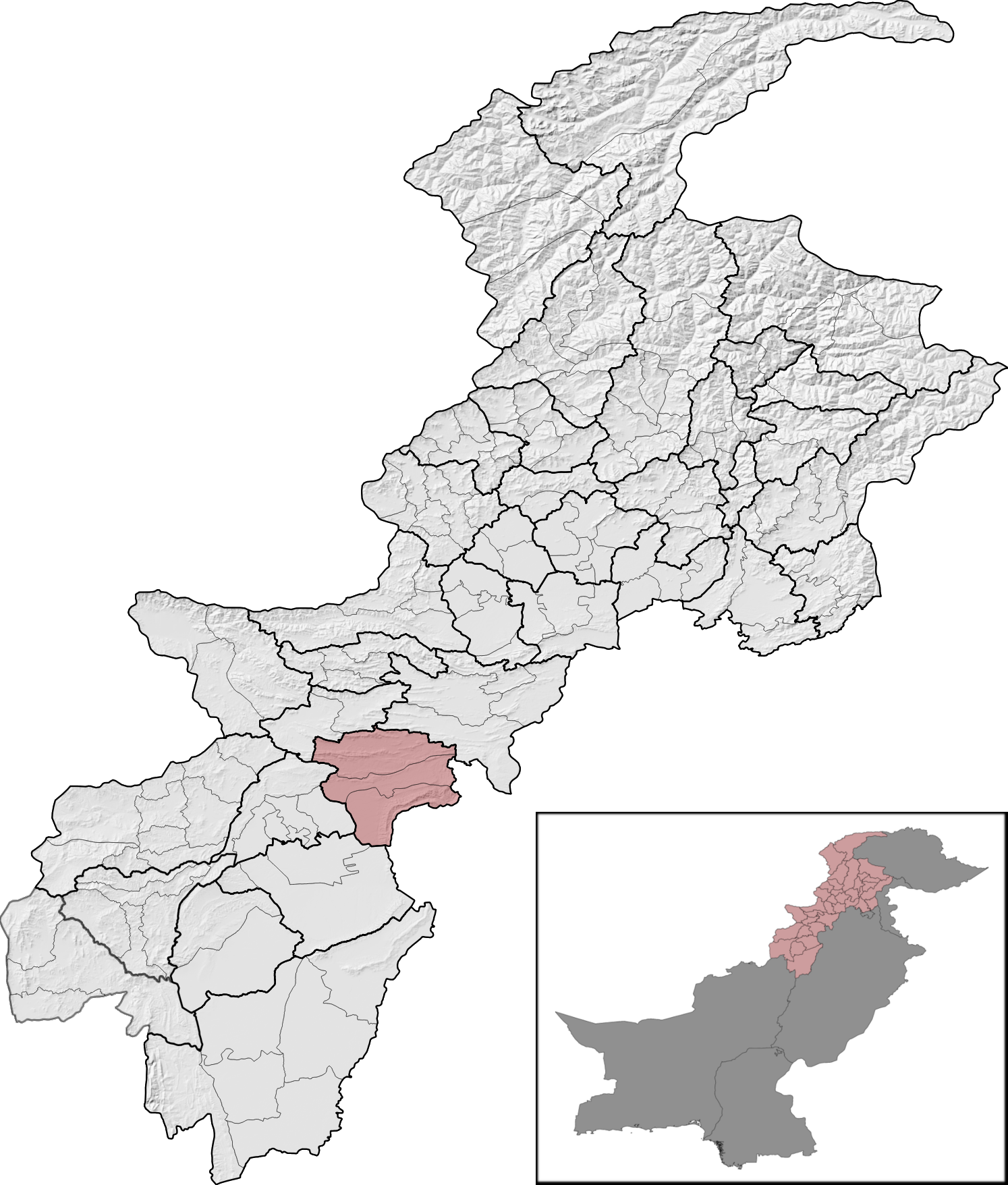
- Karak District (red) in Khyber Pakhtunkhwa
- Country: Pakistan
- Province: Khyber Pakhtunkhwa
- Division: Kohat
- Headquarters: Karak

Government
  - Type: District Administration
  - Deputy Commissioner: Sharukh Ali Khan
  - District Police Officer: N/A
  - District Health Officer: N/A

Area
  - District of Khyber Pakhtunkhwa: 3,371 km^{2} (1,302 sq mi)

Population (2023)
  - District of Khyber Pakhtunkhwa: 815,878
  - Density: 242.0/km^{2} (626.9/sq mi)
  - Urban: 58,065 (7.12%)
  - Rural: 757,813 (92.88%)

Literacy
  - Literacy rate: Total: (65.36%); Male: (84.12%); Female: (45.60%)
- Time zone: UTC+5 (PST)
- Number of Tehsils: 3
- languagea: Pashto & Urdu
- Website: karak.kp.gov.pk

Karak District (Pashto: کرک ولسوالۍ, Urdu: ضلع کرکpronounce) is a district of Kohat Division in the Khyber Pakhtunkhwa province in Pakistan. It is situated to the south of Kohat District and on the north side of Bannu and Lakki Marwat districts on the main Indus Highway between Peshawar and Karachi – it is 131 km from the provincial capital Peshawar. It gained a district status in 1982, prior to which it was part of Kohat District.

It is natively inhabited by the Khattak Pashtun tribe who make the majority of the population.

== Demographics ==
Historical population
Year	Pop.	±% p.a.
1951	99,908	—
1961	121,199	+1.95%
1972	191,204	+4.23%
1981	249,681	+3.01%
1998	430,796	+3.26%
2017	705,362	+2.63%
2023	815,878	+2.46%

As of the 2023 census, Karak district has 95,997 households and a population of 815,878. The district has a sex ratio of 106.77 males to 100 females and a literacy rate of 65.36%: 84.12% for males and 45.60% for females. 241,923 (29.68% of the surveyed population) are under 10 years of age. 58,065 (7.12%) live in urban areas. 2,424 (0.30% of the surveyed population) are from religious minorities, almost entirely Christians. Pashto is the predominant language, spoken by 99.78% of the surveyed population.

=== Religion ===
Religion in contemporary Karak District
Religious group	1941		2017		2023	
Religious group	Pop.	%	Pop.	%	Pop.	%
Islam	110,146	97.73%	705,077	99.96%	812,726	99.70%
Hinduism	2,462	2.18%	7	~0%	23	~0%
Christianity	0	0%	145	0.02%	2,335	0.29%
Others	101	0.09%	133	0.02%	66	0.01%
Total Population	112,709	100%	705,362	100%	815,150 (Note: Different from official population figure since it excludes sensitive areas where religion was not asked)	100%
Note: 1941 census data is for Teri tehsil of erstwhile Kohat district, which roughly corresponds to contemporary Karak district. District and tehsil borders have changed since 1941.

== Resources ==
There are several natural resources that have been discovered in Karak. The salt mines were well known in antiquity and a major source of salt for the Indian subcontinent into British imperial times. More recently oil, gas, and uranium have all been discovered. Oil and gas reservoirs have been found in the towns of Makori, Noshpa Banda, Gurguri and Lachi circle.

Oil and gas reservoirs explored in Karak district are producing 7000 barrels of oil and 2500 cubic feet gas on a daily basis which is a record production from one oil well in the country. The oil and gas reservoirs at Noshapa Banda in district Karak are generating millions of rupees revenue daily. District Karak has mineral resources and many national and international companies and OGDCL are busy in oil and gas exploration in different areas of the district. Vast reservoirs of oil and gas have been explored in Gurguri and Noshpa Banda areas of the district so far whereas exploration is under way in other areas.

According to a serve conducted by International Nuclear Information System where Fission Track Technique has been applied for the estimation of uranium in 30 drinking water sources of Tehsil Takht-e-Nasrati, Shnawa Gudi khill and District Karak, Kpk, Pakistan. These samples have mean, minimum and maximum concentration of uranium of 13.45 +- 3.207, 1.07 +- 0.6, 84.23 +- 15.63 micro g l/sup -1/, respectively. The significant finding was the observation of very high level of uranium in drinking water sources obtained from uranium rich bedrocks than the safe limit of WHO (15 micro g l/sup -1/) for human consumption. On the basis of this study, it was concluded that the origin of uranium is potentially due to one of the Asia richest mineral deposit of uranium in Karak, Pakistan. The results could be of vital concern in diagnosis and prognosis of uranium induced disease in the local population under investigation.

=== Representation in Assemblies ===
Member of Provincial Assembly	Party affiliation	Constituency	Year
Mian Nisar Gul Kakakhel	Muttahida Majlis-e-Amal	PK-85 Karak-I	2018
Zafar Azam	Muttahida Majlis-e-Amal	PK-86 Karak-II	2018
Shahid Khattak	PTI	NA-34 Karak	2018

== Administrative divisions ==
The district of Karak is administratively subdivided into three Tehsils. Shortly after Annexation by British in 1849 Kohat was District with Three Tehsils, Kohat, Hangu and Teri tehsil. Hangu and Teri tehsils was granted to khan on lease. Teri tesil was subdivided into tappas (equal to today Union council) under tapedars and Villages under following khans: Teri, Chakhtu, Jandri, Dam kalla, kabir kalla, ghundi shabaz khan, ghundi mir khan khel, methakhel, and one village in thal.

Tehsil	Name (Urdu) (Pashto)	Area (km²)	Pop. (2023)	Density (ppl/km²) (2023)	Literacy rate (2023)	Union Councils
Banda Daud Shah Tehsil	(Urdu: تحصیل بانڈہ داؤد شاہ)(Pashto: بانډه داود شاه تحصیل)	...	...	...	53.95%	
Karak Tehsil	(Urdu: تحصیل کرک)(Pashto: کرک تحصیل)	1,299	339,983	261.73	67.76%	
Takht-e-Nasrati Tehsil	(Urdu: تحصیل تخت نصرتی)(Pashto: تخت نصرتي تحصیل)	607	298,151	491.19	69.55%	

== Geography ==
- Kohat District
- Bannu District
- Orakzai District
- Hangu District
- Lakki Marwat

== See also ==
- Khushal Khan Khattak University
- 2020 Karak temple attack
- Districts of Pakistan
  - Districts of Khyber Pakhtunkhwa, Pakistan
  - Districts of Punjab, Pakistan
  - Districts of Balochistan, Pakistan
  - Districts of Sindh, Pakistan
  - Districts of Azad Kashmir
  - Districts of Gilgit-Baltistan
- Divisions of Pakistan
  - Divisions of Balochistan
  - Divisions of Khyber Pakhtunkhwa
  - Divisions of Punjab
  - Divisions of Sindh
  - Divisions of Azad Kashmir
  - Divisions of Gilgit-Baltistan
