= Muhammad Abbas Khan =

Pakistani police officer and civil servant

Inspector General of Police, Punjab
- In office July 1993 – November 1996

Inspector General of Police, Khyber Pakhtunkhwa (2nd tenure)
- In office 29 January 1989 – 5 September 1990

Inspector General of Police, Sindh
- In office 4 July 1988 – 1 January 1989

Inspector General of Police, Khyber Pakhtunkhwa (1st tenure)
- In office 3 November 1985 – 1 June 1988

Personal details
- Born: c. 1939 Prang village, Charsadda District, North-West Frontier Province, British India
- Died: March 31, 2021 (aged 81–82) Peshawar, Pakistan
- Cause of death: COVID-19
- Education: Lincoln's Inn; MA Public Administration, Syracuse University (1982)

Muhammad Abbas Khan (c. 1939 – 31 March 2021) was a senior Pakistani police officer of the PSP 1963 batch who served as Inspector General of Police of three provinces: Khyber Pakhtunkhwa (twice), Sindh, and Punjab. According to his obituary in The News International, this made him the only officer in Pakistan's police history to have done so.

He was a member of the Abbottabad Commission, the judicial inquiry into the circumstances of the killing of Osama bin Laden in 2011.

He was an advocate for police reform, authoring a 1996 booklet that called for replacing the Police Act, 1861 with democratic legislation. Fasihuddin, a criminologist, later described him as a "pioneer of the movement of police reforms" in Pakistan.

He died on 31 March 2021 in Peshawar at the age of 82 due to COVID-19.

== Early life and education ==
Abbas Khan was born around 1939 in Prang village, Charsadda District, in what was then the North-West Frontier Province of British India. His family was related to political and industrialist families of the province.

He obtained a law degree and then travelled to the United Kingdom to study at Lincoln's Inn, his father's alma mater, with the intention of becoming a barrister. Before completing his studies, he qualified for the CSS examination and was selected into the Police Service of Pakistan. He belonged to the 1963 batch of the PSP. He later obtained a Master's degree in Public Administration from Syracuse University in 1982.

== Career ==
=== Early postings ===
Towards the end of 1971, Abbas Khan was transferred to East Pakistan where he was serving as Superintendent of Police in Dacca (now Dhaka). During the Indo-Pakistani War of 1971, he was captured and held as a prisoner of war in India for approximately two years. On his return to Pakistan, he was appointed Inspector General of Prisons, a posting he later described as ironic.

He then served as Additional Secretary, Home and Tribal Affairs Department, Government of NWFP, before being appointed Commandant of the Frontier Constabulary in Peshawar, at one point also holding charge as Inspector General of Police of Khyber Pakhtunkhwa.

=== Inspector General of Police, Khyber Pakhtunkhwa (First tenure: 1985–1988) ===
Abbas Khan served as IGP of NWFP from 3 November 1985 to 1 June 1988. He oversaw the construction of red-brick police posts along provincial highways, designed by the architect Wilayat Khan, at intervals of approximately 20 kilometres. Built on retrieved state land, they were intended to deter highway robberies. He also founded the Special Branch of the NWFP police.

=== Inspector General of Police, Sindh (1988-1989) ===
Abbas Khan served as Inspector General of Police of Sindh from 4 July 1988 to 1 January 1989, selected for the role by the newly appointed Governor of Sindh, General Rahimuddin Khan. Following the general election of 1988, he was transferred to NWFP and appointed IGP for a second term.

=== Inspector General of Police, Khyber Pakhtunkhwa (Second tenure: 1989–1990) ===
Abbas Khan returned as IGP of NWFP from 29 January 1989 to 5 September 1990. During this second tenure he continued to hold dual charge as Commandant of the Frontier Constabulary.

=== National Police Academy ===
While serving as Commandant of the National Police Academy, Sihala, Islamabad, for three years, Abbas Khan secured land for the construction of a new multi-purpose campus to replace the academy's existing makeshift premises.

=== Federal Secretary ===
He served as Federal Secretary for States and Frontier Regions (SAFRON), Kashmir Affairs, and Northern Areas.

=== Inspector General of Police, Punjab (1993–1996) ===
Abbas Khan was selected by the interim government of Prime Minister Moeen Qureshi and appointed Inspector General of Police of Punjab for more than three years from July 1993. At the time of his death, this was the longest uninterrupted tenure held by any Punjab police chief in three decades. During this period he worked to depoliticise the Punjab Police.

A police lines in Lahore was named the Abbas Khan Police Lines in his honour, the second such naming after a Punjab IGP in the province's history. A police control room in Rawalpindi was also named after him.

=== FATA franchise reform ===
After retiring as IGP Punjab, Abbas Khan served as Federal Secretary SAFRON and supported Omar Khan Afridi, the minister of SAFRON, Interior and Narcotics Control in the caretaker government of Prime Minister Malik Meraj Khalid. In 1997 Afridi initiated the move to grant universal adult franchise to the people of the FATA, backed by President Farooq Leghari and Khalid.

=== Retirement ===
Abbas Khan retired from service in 1999.

== Police reform ==
During his tenure as IGP Punjab, Abbas Khan authored a booklet in 1996, Problems of Law and Order and Police Reforms (Vanguard, Lahore), which argued for replacing the Police Act, 1861 with a new legal framework suited to a democratic state. The 1861 Act was a colonial-era legislation that had governed policing across the subcontinent for 135 years. His proposals included making the police accountable to independent public safety commissions, granting administrative and operational autonomy to senior officers, establishing a National Police Agency, and enhancing professionalism across police sub-cadres. The booklet incorporated input from a Japanese police advisory mission invited by the Government of Pakistan in April 1996, led by the Director General of Japan's National Police Agency, whose experts had advocated replacing the prevailing "police for the government" principle with a "police for the people" philosophy.

Writing in the Pakistan Journal of Criminology, senior police officer Fasihuddin described Abbas Khan as a "pioneer of the movement of police reforms" in Pakistan, and noted that the booklet "became very famous" among police commission reports of that era. Fasihuddin further assessed that Abbas Khan and his colleagues influenced the Report of the Focal Group on Police Reforms in 2000, which was a direct precursor to the Police Order, 2002.

Abbas Khan remained involved in police reform after leaving service. He chaired the committee constituted by the Wafaqi Mohtasib to report on addressing maladministration in police stations; his earlier writings were also cited in the committee's published findings of 2016, produced pursuant to the Supreme Court's order in Civil Petition No. 1282/2014.

== Post-retirement public service ==
After retirement, Abbas Khan held a number of institutional roles:

- Member, Interior Ministry focal group on police reforms
- Member, committee on de-weaponization
- Member, National Public Safety Commission (2006)
- Member, Public Accounts Committee of the federal government
- Minister for Forests, Environment, and Transport in the caretaker government of Khyber Pakhtunkhwa (organised to oversee general elections)
- Chairman, search and scrutiny committee for the KP Ehtesab Commission
- Chairman, committee constituted by the Federal Ombudsman (Wafaqi Mohtasib Secretariat) in compliance with a Supreme Court order (Civil Petition No. 1282/2014, dated 4 September 2015) on addressing maladministration in police stations, contributing a paper on good administration standards.
- Member, Abbottabad Commission (headed by Justice Javed Iqbal), the judicial inquiry into the circumstances of the US raid in Abbottabad on 2 May 2011.

Abbas Khan declined to sign the final Abbottabad Commission report.

== Personal life and death ==
Abbas Khan was a Pashtun from Charsadda.

He died in Peshawar in 2021 at the age of 82 from COVID-19. His funeral prayers were attended by political leaders, including QWP chairman Aftab Ahmed Khan Sherpao and PPP leader Khwaja Mohammad Khan Hoti, other bureaucrats, Frontier Constabulary officials, and thousands of local residents.

== Legacy ==
Abbas Khan was buried at his ancestral village of Prang in Charsadda. Condolence references were held at the Central Police Office, Lahore. IGP Punjab Inam Ghani stated at the reference that Abbas Khan "enhanced the prestige of the post of IG Punjab with his vision and policy" and had become "a role model for all the officers of the Police Service of Pakistan." Retired senior police officer Tariq Khosa cited Abbas Khan alongside Sadaat Ali Shah and Z.I. Rathore as among the most inspirational leaders of Pakistani policing, noting their shared willingness to refuse irregular and illegal orders from higher authorities.
