= Anoosh Masood Chaudhry =

Pakistani police officer

Dr. Anoosh Masood Chaudhry انوش مسعود چوہدری

Ordered to report at Establishment Division Islamabad
- Incumbent
- Assumed office 08 December 2020
- Appointed by: Arif Nawaz Khan (Inspector General of Punjab Police)

Superintendent of Police, Punjab Police Headquarters, Lahore
- In office 1 May 2019 – 25 September 2019
- Appointed by: Arif Nawaz Khan

Additional Superintendent of Police, Investigation Branch, Punjab Police, Model Town, Lahore
- In office 20 October 2018 – 30 April 2019
- Appointed by: Amjad Javed Saleemi

Superintendent of Police, Investigation Branch, Punjab Police, Kasur
- In office Unknown – 19 October 2018
- Appointed by: Dr. Inam Ghani

Assistant Superintendent of Police, Khyber Pakhtunkhwa Police
- In office 11 December 2014 – Unknown

Personal details
- Education: Fatima Jinnah Medical College (MBBS)

Anoosh Masood Chaudhry (Urdu: انوش مسعود چوہدری) is a Pakistani police officer who serves as the deputy director, Administration, for Elite Police of Punjab, Pakistan since 26 September 2019. She was named as Lahore's best crime fighter for 2018. She became the first female Assistant Superintendent of Police (ASP) from Khyber Pakhtunkhwa province of Pakistan on 11 December 2014.

== Education ==
She completed her MBBS from Fatima Jinnah Medical College and received a gold medal in medicine. She then trained at Civil Services Academy for 40th Common Training Program and at NPA Islamabad for Specialized Training.

== Career ==
She completed a year-long house job at Mayo Hospital and attended the SAARC International Conference of Dermatology in 2008 as the youngest attendee.

Initially joining Punjab Police as an ASP in Lahore, she later moved to Abbottabad in 2014 while retaining her rank of ASP in Khyber Pakhtunkhwa Police. In that role, she became the first female ASP in Khyber Pakhtunkhwa province. She was later transferred to Punjab Police and served as Superintendent of Police (SP) of the Investigation Branch in Kasur.

On October 20, 2018, she was posted to Lahore as Additional SP of the investigation department of Model Town, where she earned the honor of being the best crime fighter for the city of Lahore in 2018. Under her leadership, the police station successfully filed 74% of challans that year. She belonged to the 40th Common Training Programme of Police Service of Pakistan.

In the first few months of 2019, Lahore's Investigation Headquarters evaluated her performance and declared her the most outstanding officer of the investigation wing out of all SPs serving the six divisions of Lahore.

On May 1, 2019, she was posted as SP of Punjab Police Headquarters in Lahore.

On September 26, 2019, she was appointed Deputy Director Administration for Elite Police of Punjab in Lahore by Inspector General Arif Nawaz Khan.

On December 8, 2020, she was prematurely transferred and directed to report to the Establishment Division by IGP Dr. Inam Ghani.

In May 2022, Chaudhry was appointed as Senior Superintendent (SSP) of Lahore's Operations Wing, becoming the first female police officer posted as SSP Operations Lahore.

In addition to being a police officer, Anoosh finds time to upload videos on a tiktok channel on top of making TV appearances notably her appearance on a comedy show HMH.

== Work for women's empowerment ==
Chaudhry has been an advocate for gender equality and women's empowerment within the police force. She has worked to increase the participation of women in law enforcement and to address the challenges they face in male-dominated environments.

Chaudhry has spoken at several forums and conferences to raise awareness about the need for gender-sensitive policing and the importance of women's inclusion in law enforcement. She has also organized training programs for female police officers to enhance their professional skills and improve their access to promotions.

In addition, Chaudhry has been actively involved in initiatives to address gender-based violence and to promote women's rights in the broader community. She has been a strong advocate for the use of community policing strategies to improve public safety and to build trust between law enforcement agencies and the communities they serve.

Chaudhry's efforts have earned her recognition both nationally and internationally. In 2020, she was awarded the International Women of Courage Award by the U.S. Department of State in recognition of her contributions to advancing women's rights and promoting gender equality in Pakistan.

== Family ==
Anoosh husband is from abbotabad, and she also has a daughter.

== See also ==
- Central Superior Services
