= 2025 India–Pakistan crisis =

2025 bilateral crisis in South Asia

- Part of Indo-Pakistani conflicts, Insurgency in Jammu and Kashmir and the Kashmir conflict
- Map of the disputed region of Kashmir
Date	23 April 2025 – 10 May 2025 (2 weeks and 3 days)
Location	International Boundary and Line of Control
Status	Ceasefire: Cancellation of Indus Water Treaty and Shimla Agreement; Visa cancellation and travel ban for Pakistanis in India; Expulsion of Pakistani diplomats from India and withdrawal of Indian counterparts from Pakistan; Suspension of all trade including through third countries with India by Pakistan; Closure of Pakistani airspace for Indian aircraft; 2025 India-Pakistan conflict

Parties involved in the standoff
India	Pakistan

Commanders and leaders
(India) Narendra Modi (India) Droupadi Murmu (India) Rajnath Singh	Shehbaz Sharif; Asif Ali Zardari (Pakistan) Khawaja Asif

Units involved
Indian Armed Forces; Indian Army; Indian Air Force; Central Armed Police Forces; Border Security Force; Central Reserve Police Force; Jammu and Kashmir Police	Pakistan Armed Forces; Pakistan Army; Pakistan Air Force; Civil Armed Forces; Pakistan Rangers; Punjab Rangers; Sindh Rangers; Gilgit-Baltistan Scouts; Pakistan Police; Azad Kashmir Police; Gilgit-Baltistan Police; Punjab Police; Sindh Police

Following the Pahalgam terrorist attack on 22 April 2025, a crisis emerged between India and Pakistan, sparked by the killing of 26 tourists by the militants in Kashmir. The Resistance Front (TRF) initially claimed responsibility for the attack. Armed skirmishes between India and Pakistan were reported along the Line of Control (LoC) beginning on 24 April. On 7 May 2025, India launched missile strikes in Pakistan, leading to a military conflict between the two countries. On 7 May 2025 Pakistan's Army responded by launching a blitz on Poonch, Jammu killing 16 civilians and leaving hundreds of homes destroyed. A ceasefire was announced on 10 May 2025 following an agreement between India and Pakistan.

The crisis emerged between the two countries after the Pahalgam terrorist attack, as India accused Pakistan of sponsoring the militants, leading Pakistan to deny its involvement and state they would be willing to cooperate with an international inquiry. India responded to the attack by expelling Pakistani diplomats, recalling its diplomatic staff, cutting off visa services, and suspending the Indus Waters Treaty. Pakistan initially responded with trade restrictions, closure of airspace and border crossings, and suspension of the Shimla Agreement. Between 24 April and 6 May, Pakistan and India engaged in skirmishes including cross-border firing and intermittent artillery shelling.

On 7 May 2025, India launched missile strikes on Pakistan, codenamed Operation Sindoor. According to India, the missile strikes targeted the militant groups Jaish-e-Mohammed and Lashkar-e-Taiba. According to Pakistan, the Indian strikes targeted civilian areas, including mosques, killing 31 Pakistani civilians. In return, said they had downed a number of Indian jets and damaged Indian infrastructure. It was believed to be the heaviest shelling attack since the Indo-Pakistani war of 1971. On early 10 May 2025, Pakistan launched their retaliatory operation codenamed Operation Bunyan-um-Marsoos and military hostilities continued until a ceasefire was reached on late 10 May 2025.

== Background ==
An Islamist armed insurgency broke out in Jammu and Kashmir in the late 1980s, which resulted in the exodus of Kashmiri Hindus from the region and the insurgency has been ongoing since.

On 22 April 2025, a terrorist attack at Baisaran Valley near Pahalgam in the Anantnag district of Indian-administered Jammu and Kashmir killed at least 26 tourists and injured more than 20 others. According to eyewitness testimonies provided to Indian media outlets, assailants reportedly questioned potential victims about their religious identity before opening fire, specifically targeting non-Muslims. All tourists killed were Hindus, except for one identified as a Christian.

The attack became among the deadliest attacks against Indian civilians in the region since 2000. The Resistance Front (TRF), believed to be an offshoot of the Pakistan-based, UN-designated terrorist group Lashkar-e-Taiba, initially claimed responsibility. They stated that the attack was in opposition to Indian government policy allowing Indian citizens to live and work in Kashmir, resulting in non-local settlement in the region. Four days later, they retracted their claim.

== Diplomatic crisis ==
On the night of 23 April 2025, the Indian foreign secretary Vikram Misri held a special press briefing after a meeting with the CCS. He announced India's decision to temporarily suspend the Indus Waters Treaty with Pakistan with immediate effect until Pakistan ceases its support for cross-border terrorism. He further announced the closure of the integrated check post at Attari–Wagah Border, a travel ban for all Pakistani nationals to India under the SAARC Visa Exemption Scheme, and cancellation of all previously issued visas. Additionally, Pakistani military advisers at the Pakistan High Commission in New Delhi were expelled, while their Indian counterparts in Islamabad were withdrawn, and the staff strength of the Indian High Commission in Islamabad was reduced from 55 to a minimum of 30. The posts of such military advisors were deemed abolished.

Pakistan's foreign ministry expressed condolences to the families of the victims, and its defense minister, Khawaja Asif, dismissed the allegations of his country's involvement in the attack and regarded such events as revolutions. However, in an interview with Sky News, while responding to allegations of terrorism, Asif said that Pakistan had backed terrorist activities at the direction of United States, Britain and the West going back three decades.

Pakistan responded to the suspension of the treaty by describing it as inappropriate and lacking seriousness. Pakistan also warned India of a comprehensive retaliation in response to the actions announced by the Indian government in the aftermath of the incident, further stating that any action affecting water resources would be considered an act of war. On 24 April, Pakistan suspended visas issued to Indian nationals and closed its airspace to Indian aircraft, expelled Indian diplomats and instructed Indian military advisers to depart the country no later than the 30 April. However, the Kartarpur Corridor remained open for Sikh pilgrims. Pakistan also cut off all trade with India. Pakistan also suspended the Simla Agreement, on 24 April 2025 in retaliation. The Attari–Wagah border ceremony was also reduced and the symbolic handshake did not take place. Cross-border families were affected where their visas revoked.

== Skirmishes ==
A joint cordon and search operation was initiated by the Indian Army, paramilitary forces, and Jammu and Kashmir Police. A temporary lockdown was imposed in Pahalgam, and Indian Army helicopters were deployed to track down the militants, who reportedly fled to the upper reaches of the Pir Panjal range. On 25 April, soldiers demolished the family residences of two individuals suspected of involvement in the Pahalgam attack. An Indian soldier was killed and two other soldiers wounded during a gunfight with insurgents in the Basantgarh region of Udhampur. Senior Lashkar-e-Taiba Commander Altaf Lalli was also killed in the gunfight.

Both Pakistani and Indian air forces conducted intensive flights near the LoC. An Indian Border Security Force soldier belonging to the 182nd battalion of the BSF was captured by Pakistan Rangers after he accidentally entered the Pakistani side of the Ferozepur border.

Also on 24 April, the Indian XV Corps reported that it had thwarted an infiltration attempt by insurgents near Uri and killed 2 insurgents.

Between 24 April and 5 May, Indian and Pakistani army engaged in skirmishes and exchanged small arms firing. Reportedly, Pakistan's army initiated small arms firing across various sectors along the LoC, which was described as "unprovoked" by Indian media. The Pakistani army stated it shot down two Indian military quadcopter drones along the LoC in the Satwal sector and in the Manawar sector of Bhimber district.

On 28 April, Pakistani Defense Minister Asif stated that an attack from the Indian armed forces was "imminent". On 30 April, Pakistan claimed it has "credible intelligence" that India is going to launch military action within several hours. On the night of 29 April, Pakistani forces opened fire on the international border along Kashmir. On 1 May, Indian Home Minister Amit Shah said that no terrorist involved in the attack would be spared by India.

On 3 May, a soldier from the Pakistan Rangers was captured by BSF after crossing the border to India.

On 5 May, the Indian Ministry of Home Affairs announced an "effective civil defence in the event of a hostile attack" on 7 May across 7 states. Such drills were last conducted by India during 1971. As per reports, the drill includes operationalisation of Air Raid Warning Sirens, crash blackout measures, training of civilians on civil defence and evacuation plans.

=== Release of river water ===
Following the suspension of the Indus Waters Treaty of 1960 on 23 April 2025, local media in Muzaffarabad, Pakistan, reported on 26 and 27 April that India had released water from the Uri Dam into the Jhelum River unannounced, resulting in flooding. Additional reports indicated a sharp decline in water levels of the Chenab River in Sialkot, Pakistan, with satellite imagery showing significant drying of the riverbed. On 4 May 2025, India had closed the Baglihar Dam on the Chenab River and was planning a similar move at the Kishanganga Dam on the Neelum River.

== Missile strikes and escalation ==
On the night of 6/7 May, India launched "Operation Sindoor", striking what it described as "terrorist infrastructure" in Pakistan. The operation lasted 23 minutes and consisted of missile strikes by IAF jets. Rajnath Singh, Minister of Defence (India), said on 8 May that at least 100 militants had been killed in the strikes.

According to India, the missile strikes of Operation Sindoor targeted the camps and infrastructure of militant groups Jaish-e-Mohammed and Lashkar-e-Taiba, and no Pakistani military facilities were targeted. According to Pakistan, the Indian strikes targeted civilian areas, including mosques, killing 31 Pakistani civilians. Following these strikes, border skirmishes and drone strikes occurred between the two countries. Jaish-e-Mohammad chief Maulana Masood Azhar accepted that 10 members of his family and four of his aides were killed in India's airstrikes on the group's headquarters at the Jamia Masjid Subhan Allah in Bahawalpur.

On 7 May, Pakistan's army launched mortar shells on the border district of Poonch in the Hindu-majority Jammu region. It was considered the worst shelling attack of the ongoing armed conflict in over 50 years, and the heaviest shelling attack since the Indo-Pakistani war of 1971. Indian sources claimed it killed one Indian soldier, 16 civilians, including 12-year-old twins, and leaving 43 wounded, and destroyed 31 schools, hundreds of homes, and a Sikh temple and its ragi. In response to the Pakistani shelling, the Indian Army responded with heavy and intense shelling in Pakistani administered Azad Kashmir. According to the report of Azad Kashmir State Disaster management authority 31 Pakistani civilians were killed in Azad Kashmir's ten districts due to Indian shelling and gunfire. The report also said that at least 287 houses and 21 shops were damaged due to shelling in the past four days while 22 cattle were killed.

In retaliation, on 10 May, Pakistan launched an operation codenamed "Operation Bunyan-un-Marsoos" targeting several Indian military bases. India also continued Operation Sindoor, expanding its scope to target Pakistani military installations. This conflict marked the first drone battle between the two nuclear-armed nations.

=== Ceasefire ===
After three days of the conflict, both India and Pakistan announced that a ceasefire was agreed, effective from 5:00 pm IST/04:30 pm PKT (11:30 UTC) on 10 May, with talks set for 12 May. Following the deadline, both countries accused each other of violating the ceasefire agreement.

== Reactions ==
=== United Nations ===
The United Nations urged both sides to have "maximum restraint" and to resolve the issues diplomatically.

=== Iran ===
On 25 April, the Islamic Republic of Iran proposed to mediate a solution aiming at de-escalation between Pakistan and India.

=== Russia ===
Russia issued a travel advisory in April 2025, warning its citizens against traveling to Pakistan following the Pahalgam attack in Jammu and Kashmir. The advisory cited increased security risks in the region.

=== United States ===
The U.S. State Department updated its travel advisory, issuing a Level 4 "Do Not Travel" warning for India's Jammu and Kashmir, citing high risks of terrorism and civil unrest. Additionally, the U.S. Embassy in New Delhi confirmed it is closely monitoring the situation and called for the perpetrators to be brought to justice, reaffirming its support for India's counterterrorism efforts. On 26 April 2025, President Donald Trump downplayed the diplomatic crisis, stating that the two nations "had that fight for 1,500 years", despite the fact that the Kashmir crisis started in 1947. United States Secretary of State Marco Rubio stated that he is closely monitoring the situation after being advised by National Security Advisor of India Ajit Doval via phonecall after Operation Sindoor.

On 10 May, a few days after Vice President JD Vance stated the conflict was "none of our business", President Trump first announced the ceasefire on social media, claiming the US had an active role in mediating the agreement. While Pakistan acknowledged American involvement, Indian officials maintained the agreement had been reached directly between the two countries.

The Indian airstrikes targeted terrorist infrastructure in Pakistan, including a Jaish-e-Mohammed (JeM) camp in Bahawalpur. This camp was historically linked to the 2002 abduction and murder of Wall Street Journal reporter Daniel Pearl. The operation reportedly resulted in the death of Abdul Rauf Azhar, a senior JeM commander and brother of Masood Azhar, who was implicated in Pearl's beheading.

=== India ===
The Government of India subsequently enacted a ban on several Pakistan-based YouTube channels for spreading provocative and communally sensitive content, as well as false narratives targeting the country, its Army, and security agencies, as well as a ban on Instagram accounts of several Pakistani celebrities.

As of 8 May 2025, the escalation has caused significant disruptions in air travel across the region. India has closed 27 airports in its northern and western regions until 10 May, resulting in the cancellation of over 430 flights. Major Indian airlines, including Air India, IndiGo, and SpiceJet, have suspended operations to and from affected areas. International carriers such as Lufthansa, KLM, Singapore Airlines, and Thai Airways have rerouted flights to avoid Pakistani airspace, leading to longer travel times and delays on routes between Europe and Asia. Pakistan has also suspended flights from key airports, including Karachi, Lahore, and Sialkot, until further notice. The situation remains fluid, with both countries' airspaces experiencing closures and reroutings, impacting global aviation networks.

In late July, more than two months after the actual crisis and subsequent four-day long conflict concluded, India's defence minister stated in an Indian parliament discussion that the military operations were halted only after it was ascertained by the Indian side that its political and military objectives were achieved, rejecting the claims made by U.S. President Donald Trump that he was part of mediation. On 29 July 2025, during a Lok Sabha debate, Prime Minister Narendra Modi asserted that no world leader had asked India to halt the military operation, dismissing suggestions of foreign intervention. Modi stated that the ceasefire, implemented on 10 May, followed a request from Pakistan and reiterated that India's actions were non-escalatory. He also revealed that U.S. Vice President JD Vance had attempted to contact him on the night of 9 May but was unable to reach him as Modi was in a meeting with the armed forces.

=== Pakistan ===
In May 2025 a coalition of Pakistani actors including Adnan Siddiqui and Ghulam Mohiuddin called for peace talks, emphasising the urgent need for dialogue and understanding to foster harmony and resolve conflict.

=== Nepal ===
On 9 May 2025, a peace group held a mass demonstration to demand peace.

=== China ===
In July 2025, Chinese air force chief Lt. Gen. Wang Gang visited Pakistan to learn how Islamabad had used Chinese equipment to put together the "kill chain” for the Rafale.

=== Others ===
The United Kingdom also issued a travel advisory warning in April 2025, mainly referring to the LoC. Members of the Indian diaspora protested outside the High Commission of Pakistan in London.

The United States Commission on International Religious Freedom (USCIRF) Commissioner condemned the killing of Indian tourists in the Kashmir terrorist attack in April 2025 stating “We are deeply concerned by the explicit targeting of Hindus and other non-Muslims”.

China's Foreign Minister, Wang Yi, urged for de-escalation between the two countries. Bangladesh and UAE supported peace talks.

== See also ==
- 2019 India–Pakistan border skirmishes
- 2020–21 India–Pakistan border skirmishes
- 2023 India–Pakistan border skirmishes
