= Punjab Constabulary =

Law enforcement reserve police agency

Punjab Constabulary پنجاب کانسٹیبلری
- Abbreviation: P.C

Agency overview
- Formed: 16 December 1972

Jurisdictional structure
- Operations jurisdiction: Punjab, Pakistan
- Map of Punjab Constabulary's jurisdiction
- Area: 205,344 square kilometres (79,284 sq mi)
- Population: 110,012,442
- Legal jurisdiction: Punjab
- General nature: Civilian police

Operational structure
- Headquarters: Farooqabad, Sheikhupura District
- Agency executive: Imran Arshad (PSP), Commandant Punjab Constabulary / Additional IG of Police

Website
- punjabconstabulary.gov.pk

The Punjab Constabulary (Punjabi, Urdu: پنجاب کانسٹیبلری) is a law enforcement agency in Pakistan which is responsible for maintaining peace in the Punjab Province by assisting Punjab Police. The Inspector General of Punjab is the principal provincial police officer and heads all subordinate police units. Punjab Constabulary is a police unit working under the command of Commandant (Addl: Inspector General of Police). It takes actions to maintain law and order in the province and participate in different rescue operations. Punjab Constabulary is a reserve police force which provides security to different personalities and guards are deputed at different sensitive buildings all over the Punjab.

Addl: Inspector General of Police, Imran Arshad, PSP has been appointed the new Commandant of Punjab Constabulary as of 08.05.2023.

== History ==
The District Armed Reserves remained more or less static since independence. Government of Punjab created Punjab Reserve Police in 1972 with the following sanctioned strength:

SP	DSP	Inspector	Sub Inspector	ASI	Head Constable	Constable
01	03	06	25	23	113	1000

The strength of PRP was gradually increased from time to time and by 1981 was as under:

DIG	SP	DSP	Inspector	Sub Inspector	ASI	Head Constable	Constable
01	01	04	11	44	49	244	2636

In 1982 the strength was enhanced to 5000 with its contingents at Lahore, Rawalpindi, Faisalabad, Multan & Gujranwala. On 01-02-1987, PRP was renamed as “Punjab Constabulary”. A separate Anti-riot Force was raised as a unit of Punjab Police. The purpose was to build the capacity of police and reduce its dependence on rangers/army.

Later on, the level of command was upgraded from DIG to the Addl: IGP on 27-02-2006. Now Punjab Constabulary is a borrowing agency where police officials and officers of different ranks (Constable to Inspector) are received from various districts and regions for a period of 02 years. On completion of 02 years period, they are repatriated to their parent districts/regions subject to provision of substitutes.

ISLAMABAD, June 19, 2007: Around 1,300 personnel of Punjab Constabulary (PC), called to reinforce the Islamabad Capital Territory (ICT) police to handle the Lal Masjid crisis, demonstrated in the Aabpara Chowk on Tuesday in protest against the death of a colleague.

In a major corruption case of Battalion No.3 Punjab constabulary Multan, action was taken against the guilty ones

== Organization ==
The Punjab Constabulary is constituted by the Police Order 2002 and operates under Police Rules of 1934. Regional Police Officers and District Police Officers send demand of PC Force to IGP Punjab Lahore as per prevailing law & order situation. The AIG/Operations CPO Punjab distributes PC Force as per the demand of the Regions/Districts. Therefore, on receipt of the direction/order from CPO Punjab Lahore, the PC Force (Reserves) are dispatched to the concerned Districts for a limited period. Punjab Constabulary has 07 Battalions in different cities and Headquarters is situated in Farooqabad City, District Sheikhupura. Detail of Punjab Constabulary's Battalions is as under:-

Battalion	Address / City
Battalion No.1	Abbas Lines, Lahore
Battalion No.2	Rawat, Rawalpindi
Battalion No.3	Matti Tall, Multan
Battalion No.4	Makkuana, Faisalabad
Battalion No.5	Abbas Lines, Lahore
Battalion No.6	Farooqabad, District Sheikhupura
Battalion No.7	Abbas Lines, Lahore
Headquarters	Farooqabad, District Sheikhupura

Detail of Sanctioned Strength of PC Force is mentioned below:-

Battalion	SSP/SP	DSP	Inspector	Sub Inspector	ASI	Head Constable	Constable	Total
Battalion No.1	01	03	09	33	70	160	1470	1746
Battalion No.2	01	03	09	33	70	160	1470	1746
Battalion No.3	01	04	09	33	70	160	1470	1747
Battalion No.4	01	04	09	33	70	160	1470	1747
Battalion No.5	01	03	09	33	70	160	1470	1746
Battalion No.6	-	03	06	33	70	160	1470	1742
Battalion No.7	01	02	09	33	70	230	1470	1815
Headquarters	01	--	03	19	21	130	377	551
Total	07	22	63	250	511	1320	10667	12840

== Equipment ==
- Semi-automatic rifle
- Submachine gun
- HK G3 Assault Rifle
- Light machine gun
- MP5A3 SMG
- Beretta 92FS Pistol
- Shotgun 12 Bore
- Sniper rifle
- Starting pistol (Starter Pistol)
- 38 Special Rivolver
- Bren light machine gun
- Tear Gas Gun
- Long Range Shell
- Short Range Shell
- Smoke Grenades
- Mortar Gun 60mm
- Morter Gun 40mm
- Tear Gas Mask
- Chemical Mask

== Head of Organization ==
Additional Inspector General of Police is the Commandant of Punjab Constabulary. Hereunder, is the list of Commandants who have served this unit.

No.	Name of Officer	From	To
1	Agha Raza Ali	16-12-1972	10-04-1975
2	Ch. Muhammad Ashiq	23-04-1975	24-09-1975
3	LR Niblet	25-09-1975	06-05-1976
4	Malik Ghulam Rasool	02-05-1976	30-05-1977
5	Sarosh Rauf Alvi	07-06-1977	16-08-1977
6	Ghulam Asghar Khan	20-08-1977	24-10-1977
7	Muhammad Asghar Khan	25-10-1977	20-03-1978
8	Fazal Mahmood	20-03-1978	17-09-1978
9	LR Niblet	17-09-1978	30-07-1980
10	Ghulam Asghar Malik	30-07-1980	27-10-1981
11	Muhammad Sadiq Malik	28-10-1981	05-08-1984
12	LR Niblet	22-11-1984	28-03-1985
13	Shahid Hussain	28-03-1985	31-05-1985
14	Khalid Latif	21-07-1985	23-01-1990
15	Jahangir Mirza	24-01-1990	21-08-1993
16	Maj. (R) Mian Zaheer Ahmad	21-08-1993	09-10-1995
17	Dr. Azhar Hassan Nadeem	05-11-1995	28-10-1998
18	Tallat Mahmood Tariq	31-10-1998	06-02-2000
19	Kh. Khalid Farooq	07-02-2000	10-06-2000
20	Tallat Mahmood Tariq	10-06-2000	22-05-2001
21	Tariq Saleem	23-05-2001	22-09-2001
22	Parvez Raheem Rajput	22-09-2001	02-09-2002
23	Tahir Anwar Pasha	02-09-2002	14-01-2004
24	Khawaja Khalid Farooq (QPM)	15-01-2004	29-05-2004
25	Parvez Raheem Rajpoot	29-05-2004	09-10-2004
26	Syed Saqlain Naqvi	09-10-2004	29-10-2004
27	Khawaja Khalid Farooq (QPM)	29-10-2004	20-09-2005
28	Tallat Mahmood Tariq	21-09-2005	26-01-2006
29	Javed Noor	27-01-2006	27-02-2006
30	Muhammad Ali	27-02-2006	17-06-2006
31	Muhammad Waseem	17-06-2006	16-01-2007
32	Khwaja Khalid Farooq	16-01-2007	02-06-2008
33	Shamas ul Hassan	02-06-2008	04-07-2008
34	Tallat Mahmood Tariq	04-07-2008	19-03-2009
35	Fayyaz Ahmad Mir	26-03-2009	04-04-2009
36	Haji Muhammad Habib ur Rehman	04-04-2009	17-02-2012
37	Ahmad Raza Tahir	23-04-2012	08-07-2013
38	Capt (R) Muhammad Zubair	12-08-2013	30-07-2014
39	Syed Dilawar Abbas	31-07-2014	13-10-2014
40	Hussain Asghar	22-10-2014	30-06-2018
41	Kunwar Shahrukh	29-10-2018	17.07.2020
41	Muhammad Ehsan Tufail	20-07-2020	08-04-2023
42	Imran Arshad	08-05-2023	Present

== See also ==
- Punjab Police
- Dolphin Force
- Elite Police
- Punjab Prisons (Pakistan)
- Punjab Highway Patrol
