= Sahiwal killings =

Encounter killing of a Lahore-based family near Sahiwal city

- Date: January 19, 2019; 7 years ago
- Venue: Highway
- Location: Highway, Sahiwal, Pakistan
- Cause: Encounter killings by police
- Motive: Counter-terrorism
- Deaths: 4
- Injuries: 2
- Accused: CTD Punjab

The Sahiwal killings are the shooting of a couple, their teenage daughter and their neighbour who was driving a Suzuki Alto during an alleged police encounter on 19 January 2019, staged by Punjab Counter Terrorism Department (CTD) on a highway near Sahiwal city of Pakistan.

The victims were identified as grocery store owner Mohammad Khalil, his wife Nabila, their 13-year-old daughter Areeba and their friend who was driving the car, Zeeshan Javed. Their son Umair Khalil sustained bullet wounds while his sister Muniba's hand also sustained gunshot-related injuries and Hadia, their younger sister remained unhurt.

The police first claimed that they were kidnappers who were kidnapping the children, they told the story to people at a petrol pump where they left the children of the victims. After video of the Khalil's son surfaced where he claimed that the deceased in the encounter were his parents, the story took a turn and the CTD changed its stance, declaring only the driver named Zeeshan as terrorist affiliated with ISIS.

According to initial press releases, CTD claimed that on intelligence report an anti-terrorism operation was conducted. During this raid, four people were killed by their own collaborators and three terrorists managed to flee. However, eyewitness reports and statements of survivors negated the version of CTD.

== Surviving children’s stance ==
Surviving children stance was the reason of highlighting this brutal incident on social media.

Khalil's son Umair Khalil, said the incident took place when they were on their way to attend the wedding ceremony of his uncle Rizwan in Burewala. He said they were travelling from Tariqabad (Kot Lakhpat) area of Lahore, to Burewala (Sahiwal) when the police opened fire on their vehicle. My father had asked the law-enforcers to check their vehicle and told them that there were no weapons. However, the police did not pay any heed and opened fire, killing his parents on-the-spot. He further added “ “We survived the firing. We were taken to a petrol station and left there”

Umair said that the Counter Terrorism Department (CTD) officials first got all four siblings out of the car and then again put their elder sister Areeba, 13 years, inside the car and opened fire.

== Government and the Counter Terrorism Department's stance ==
=== Victims were abductors ===
Preliminary news surfaced on the news channels after the incident that police recovered three children from the abductors. News channel reported that in an encounter against suspected kidnappers, law enforcers killed two women among four persons allegedly in a ‘gun battle’ to recover children. However, this botched cover-up was exposed after the viral video of Umair Kahlil, slain couple's son, began talking to reporters in hospital. Khalil said in the video that his father pleaded before them to take their money and not to shoot them but they started firing.

=== Victims were terrorists ===
Fawad Chaudhry, the federal information minister, while commenting over the Counter Terrorism Department's action in Sahiwal asserted that all those killed were terrorist and they apparently used the family as human shield.

Later, a Joint Investigation report declared three victims as innocent. Basharat Raja described the killings as "collateral damage".

=== Victims opened fire on police ===
The Counter Terrorism Department, in a statement detailing its version of Saturday's alleged encounter in Sahiwal that left four people, including two women, dead, claimed that the “terrorist” driving the car shot at the police when intercepted. Some witnesses quoted widely by TV channels corroborated the assertion that there had been no firing from those travelling in the ill-fated car. One witness said the elite police forced the vehicle to stop and fired at the car occupants from a close range, which was later confirmed in autopsy reports.

=== Police recovered explosives from victims ===
Punjab Law Minister, Basharat Raja, claimed that two suicide jackets, eight hand grenades, two pistols and bullets were recovered from the car Eyewitnesses, however, disputed the claim and said the people in the car did not fire at officials, nor were any explosives recovered from the vehicle.

=== Zeeshan is the only terrorist ===
Provincial Minister for Information and Culture, Fayyaz-ul-Hassan Chohan, on Tuesday said that the preliminary report submitted by the Joint Investigation Team on the Sahiwal incident has transpired that deceased Khalil and his family were innocent, whereas Zeeshan belonged to a terrorist group.

However, Zeeshan's brother Ehtisham claimed that he worked in the Dolphin Force and that authorities certainly had done background checks when he joined the force. He said that there was not a single FIR registered against his brother in the country.

== Human rights issues ==
=== Killing of parents in front of their children ===
Children rights activists lodged protests and said the killing of a couple and their 13-year-old daughter in front of their minor children would have a deep psychological impact on the survivors and it had destroyed their childhood. The children would never forget violence initiated by law enforcement agencies and remain in trauma for the whole life.

=== Killing of a minor girl in front of her younger siblings ===
There is 13 year girl was also killed in this incident. 13-year-old Areeba was shot four times as per the postmortem report, which indicated that brutality of the law enforcing forces,

=== Threats to family ===
The counsel of family of Sahiwal incident victims on Monday called for providing security to his clients in the wake of alleged threats from some officials of Counter Terrorism Department.

== First information report issue ==
The First Information Report (FIR) of the Sahiwal incident, lodged by the Counter-Terrorism Department (CTD) raised several questions. The law experts started arguing that the anti-terrorism department has cunningly saved its high-profile officers by citing the name of a sub-inspector as an in-charge of the Sahiwal operation, in the FIR of the case.

== Postmortem report ==
Areeba, 13, was shot six times, and had her ribs broken by the impact of the bullets. She was also shot in both sides of the chest. Nabeela was shot four times, including one time in the head. Khalil was shot 11 times, including one shot to his head. The driver Zeeshan was shot 13 times, including one shot to the head. The headshot had shattered his skull. Medical report also stated that a wound on the hand six-year-old Muniba, which officials earlier claimed was caused by glass shard from the window of the car, was in fact a gunshot wound. The bullet tore through her hand.

== Judicial Inquiry ==
The Lahore High Court on 14 February 2019 ordered judicial inquiry into Sahiwal incident. The orders were given by Chief Justice Sardar Shamim.

== Domestic reaction ==
=== Public reaction ===
Soon after news of the incident broke, protests erupted in Lahore. During the protest, Ferozepur road was blocked and Metro Bus service suspended. This protest was ended after FIR was lodged against killers of the family. Later on several protests and strikes observed throughout Punjab against this incident and protesters demanded justice for deceased. Protestors also slammed ministers for their inhuman behavior towards incident.

==== Shehri Tahaffuz march ====
On 10 February, a large number of people protested against the killings under the Shehri Tahafuz March (Citizen Protection March) at Lahore. The victim families also attended this march and termed CTD as "Killer force" and demanded accountability of the killers.

=== Pakistan Peoples Party ===
Qamar Zaman Kaira, rejected the joint investigation team (JIT), formed by the government, demanding formation of a judicial commission to probe the Sahiwal killings.

Chairman Bilawal Bhutto Zardari criticized the Pakistan Tehreek-e-Insaf-led government for the Sahiwal killings and said “Sahiwal incident is a message for citizens in Naya Pakistan that they should not go outside their homes with families,”

Khursheed Shah demanded the Prime Minister Imran Khan to tender an apology to the nation over Sahiwal encounter killings.

=== Pakistan Muslim League Nawaz ===
Rana Sanaullah said, “The JIT drama is a joke with the nation and we completely reject this drama of the government.”

Leader of the Opposition in National Assembly Shehbaz Sharif called for the resignation of Prime Minister Imran Khan and Punjab Chief Minister Usman Buzdar in the aftermath of Sahiwal incident.

Leader of Opposition in the Punjab Assembly Hamza Shehbaz Sharif called for holding a judicial inquiry into the tragic incident of Sahiwal.

Party's spokesperson Marriyum Aurangzeb has called on Prime Minister Imran Khan to own up to his past claims and resign after accepting responsibility for the Sahiwal catastrophe instead of optics.

== No One Killed " the innocent family" ==
A special anti-terrorism court in Lahore acquitted all suspects in the Sahiwal encounter case giving them the benefit of doubt.

Muhammad Jalil, complainant and brother of deceased Muhammad Khalil, told Dawn that family had no intention to challenge the ATC verdict.

== See also ==
- 2014 Lahore clash
- List of cases of law enforcement brutality in Pakistan
- 2010 Abbottabad police killings
