= Azad Kashmir Police =

Pakistani police agency

Azad Jammu and Kashmir Police آزاد جموں و کشمیر پولیس
- Abbreviation: A.J.K.P.

Agency overview
- Employees: 80,000
- Annual budget: Classified

Jurisdictional structure
- Operations jurisdiction: Azad Kashmir, Pakistan
- Map of Azad Jammu and Kashmir Police's jurisdiction
- Area: 13,297 km^{2} (5,134 sq mi)
- Population: 6,200,000
- Legal jurisdiction: Azad Kashmir
- Primary governing body: Government of Azad Kashmir
- Secondary governing body: Home Department of Azad Kashmir
- General nature: Local civilian police

Operational structure
- Headquarters: Muzaffarabad, Azad Kashmir
- Agency executive: Liaqat Ali (PSP), Inspector General of Police (IG)

Website
- police.ajk.gov.pk

The Azad Kashmir Police (آزاد کشمیر پولیس) or Azad Jammu and Kashmir Police (AJKP) is responsible for law enforcement in the Azad Kashmir region administered by Pakistan. It is presently headed by Inspector-General of Police, Capt (R) Liaqat Ali Malik (PSP).

The AJK Police is headquartered at the Central Police Office (CPO) Muzaffarabad, Azad Kashmir.

Unlike the police chiefs of other administrative units of Pakistan, where the Inspector General of Police is usually an officer of BPS-22, the Inspector-General of Azad Jammu and Kashmir Police is usually an officer of BPS-21, due to the small size of the force.

The mission of the AJK Police is the prevention and detection of crime, maintenance of law and order and enforcement of the Constitution of Pakistan.

Azad Jammu and Kashmir Police consists of 80,000 personnel, responsible for law and order in the 10 districts of Azad Kashmir. Azad Jammu and Kashmir Police works under the supervision of Home Department of the Government of Azad Kashmir.

== Composition and Organization ==
Central Police Office (CPO), Muzzaffarabad serves as headquarters of AJK Police where Inspector General of Police, Azad Kashmir Police (AJKP) sits. All main administrative branches of AJK Police such as Investigation, Finance and Establishment branches are headquartered at CPO Muzzafarabad. When it comes to operational jurisdiction, AJK Police is divided into three ranges located at three divisions of Azad Kashmir. Each range is headed by Deputy Inspector General of Police (DIGP) who are called as Regional Police Officers (RPO).These regions are consisted of 3 to 4 district police. Each District Police is led by an officer with a rank of Superintendent of Police who is considered as the District Police Officer (DPO). Currently, Muzzafarabad, Poonch and Mirpur are three ranges of AJK Police that are being led by DIGP rank police officials.

== Departments ==
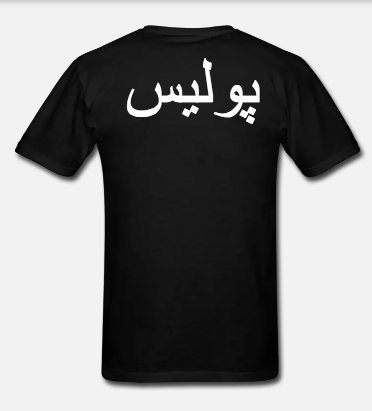
Pakistan Police uniform shirt

- Traffic Branch
- Counter Terrorism Department
- Special Branch (Intelligence unit)
- Investigation Branch
- Operations Branch
- IT Branch
- Admin Branch
- Crime Branch
- Finance and Logistical Branch

== Services ==
- 24 Hours Helpline
- Emergency Help (Madadgar One-Five 15 )
- Police Khidmat Markaz
- Safe City Project (Muzzafarabad)
- Digital Sentinel System / E-Policing
- Theft Reporting
- Child Lost and Found Center
- Forensic Science Lab (FSL)
- Complaint Redressal System (CRS)
- Bomb Disposal Squad
- Crime investigation
- Safe City Projects
- Tourism Police

== Designations ==
Designations of AJK Police are as follows:

Grade	Police Ranks	Abbreviations
BPS-07	Constable	PC
BPS-09	Head Constable	HC
BPS-11	Assistant Sub-Inspector	ASI
BPS-14	Sub-Inspector	SI
BPS-16	Police Inspector	Inspector
BPS-17	Assistant Superintendent of Police; Deputy Superintendent of Police	ASP; DSP
BPS-18	Superintendent of Police	SP
BPS-19	Senior Superintendent of Police/Assistant Inspector General of Police	SSP/AIGP
BPS-20	Deputy Inspector General of Police	DIGP
BPS-21	Inspector General of Police	IGP
BPS-22	Supreme Commander of Police	SCP

=== Posts ===
SHO, SDPO, DPO, CPO, RPO and PPO are posts, not ranks. So you may see a lower rank acting as a higher post for some time.

== IGPs of AJK Police ==
	Name	From	To
06	Rao Abdur Rasheed (PSP)	29 August 1957	24 January 1961
42	Sohail Habib Tajik (PSP)	June 2021	May 2022
43	Amir Ahmed Sheikh (PSP)	May 2022	January 2024
44	Sohail Habib Tajik (PSP)	January 2024	18 May 2024
45	Abdul Jabbar (PSP)	18 May 2024	16 February 2026
46	Capt (R) Liaquat Ali Malik (PSP)	16 February 2026	Incumbent

== See also ==
- Law enforcement in Pakistan
- Crime Control Department
- Dolphin Force
- Punjab Police (Pakistan)
- Balochistan Police
- Islamabad Police
- Khyber Pakhtunkhwa Police
- Gilgit-Baltistan Police
- Sindh Police
