= Gilgit-Baltistan Police =

Pakistani police agency

Gilgit-Baltistan Police گِلگِت بَلتِسْتان پولیس
- Abbreviation: GB Police
- Motto: To Serve and To Protect

Agency overview
- Formed: 1972; 54 years ago
- Employees: 50,000
- Annual budget: Classified

Jurisdictional structure
- Operations jurisdiction: Gilgit-Baltistan, Pakistan
- Jurisdictions of Gilgit-Baltistan Police marked in red
- Area: 72,496 km^{2} (27,991 sq mi)
- Population: 2,500,000
- Legal jurisdiction: Gilgit-Baltistan
- Governing body: Government of Gilgit-Baltistan
- General nature: Civilian police

Operational structure
- Headquarters: Gilgit, Gilgit-Baltistan
- Agency executive: Dr. Akbar Nasir Khan, Inspector General of Police (IG)
- Parent agency: Police Service of Pakistan

Facilities
- Stations: 65

Website
- gbp.gov.pk

The Gilgit-Baltistan Police (Urdu: گِلگِت بَلتِسْتان پولیس), formerly known as Northern Areas Police, is responsible for law enforcement in the Gilgit-Baltistan region of Pakistan. The mission of the GB Police is the prevention and detection of crime, maintenance of law and order and enforcement of the Constitution of Pakistan.

The current Inspector General of Gilgit-Baltistan Police is Dr. Akbar Nasir Khan since 4 February 2026.

== Organization ==
Around twelve administrative branches work under Inspector-General of Police (IGP) at the Central Police Office, Gilgit. Each of the branches is headed by an Additional Inspector General (AIG). Operationally, the force is divided into three administrative ranges in Gilgit-Baltistan, these being Gilgit, Baltistan, and Diamer where the force is headed by a Regional Police Officer (RPO) with a rank not less than a Deputy Inspector General (DIG). The DIG in turn manages various Senior Superintendent of Police (SSP), Superintendents of Police (SP) Inspectors of Police (IP) and Sub-Divisional Police Officers (SDPO) who operate at the district level.

- Investigation Branch
- Special Branch
- Operations Branch
- Establishment and HQ
- Training Branch
- Logistic Branch
- Logistic Branch
- Tourism Police
- Legal Branch
- Special Protection Unit
- Counter Terrorism Department
- Crime Branch
- IBEX Squad

Central Police Office	Incumbent	Designation Rank
Inspector General	Akbar Nasir Khan	IGP
Establishment and HQ	Tahira Yasub	AIG
Operations Branch	Hussan Zareen	AIG
Logistic Branch		AIG
Counter Terrorism Department	Hussan Zareen	DSP
Legal Branch		AIG
Special Protection Unit (SPU)		AIG
Special Branch		AIG
Investigation Branch		SSP
Police Training College (PTC)		SSP
Training Branch		SSP
Tourism Police		SSP
Crime Branch		SSP
Gilgit Range	Incumbent	Designation/Rank
Regional Police Office		RPO/DIG
District Police Office Gilgit	Zahoor Ahmed	DPO/SSP
District Police Office Hunza	Salman Liaquat	DPO/SP
District Police Office Nagar	Ishaq Hussain	DPO/SSP
District Police Office Ghizer	Sher Khan	DPO/SP
District Police Office Yasin	Rehmat Baig	DPO/IP SDPO
District Police Office Singal	Ghulam Mohi ud Din	DPO/IP SDPO
District Police Office Phandar	Akbar Hussain	DPO/IP SDPO
Baltistan Range	Incumbent	Designation/Rank
Regional Police Office	Cap. (R) Liaquat Ali Malik	RPO/DIG
District Police Office Skardu	Hasan Ali	DPO/SSP
District Police Office Kharmang	Ahmed Shabbir	DPO/SP
District Police Office Shigar	Ziaullah Khan	DPO/SP
District Police Office Ghanche	Jan Mohammad	DPO/SP
District Police Office Astore	Tufail Ahmed Mir	DPO/SP
District Police Office Rondu	Babar Ali Khan	DPO/IP SDPO
Diamer Range	Incumbent	Designation/Rank
Regional Police Office	Awais Ahmed	RPO/DIG
District Police Office Diamer	Sher Khan (T.St)	DPO/SP
District Police Office Darel	Hamayon	DPO/IP SDPO
District Police Office Tangir	Jamal ud Din	DPO/IP SDPO
District Police Office Goharabad	Liaqat Ali	DPO/IP SDPO

== Inspectors General of Gilgit-Baltistan Police ==
After the establishment of the Northern Areas Police in 1972, the first Assistant Inspector General (AIG) was Captain Muhammad Babar Khan, followed by Abdul Hameed Khawar in 1974, and then Colonel Mir Wali. The powers of Inspector-General were exercised by the Deputy Commissioner.

In 1975 Sidique Suleiman was appointed the first Inspector-General of Police.

Name	From	To	Ref.
Dr. Mujeebur Rahman Khan (PSP)	15 January 2020	25 March 2021	
Saeed Wazir (PSP)	25 March 2021	March 2023	
Dar Ali Khattak (PSP)	March 2023	5 July 2023	
Afzal Mehmood Butt (PSP)	6 July 2023	4 February 2026	
Dr. Akbar Nasir Khan (PSP)	04 February 2026	Incumbent	

== See also ==
- Law enforcement in Pakistan
- Crime Control Department
- Dolphin Force
- Punjab Police (Pakistan)
- Balochistan Police
- Azad Kashmir Police
- Islamabad Police
- Khyber Pakhtunkhwa Police
- Sindh Police
