= Ghulam Mahmood Dogar =

Pakistani police officer

Ghulam Mehmood Dogar
- غلام محمود ڈوگر

Personal details
- Born: 23 April 1963 (age 62) Balqan, Sialkot
- Occupation: Retired officer of Police Services of Pakistan

Ghulam Mehmood Dogar (Urdu: غلام محمود ڈوگر; born 23 April 1963) is a Pakistani retired police officer who served in grade-21 as Capital City Police Officer, Lahore. He belonged to the Police Services of Pakistan (PSP).

== Early life and education ==
Dogar was born in village Balqan, district Sialkot. He possesses a degree in civil engineering and is a graduate of University of Engineering and Technology, Lahore.

== Career in police ==
Dogar qualified Central Superior Services exam in 1993 and joined the Police Services of Pakistan on 31 October 1993. He belongs to the 21st Common Training Programme of Civil Services Academy, Lahore. During his career in police, he has served as Assistant Superintendent of Police Nawabshah, Pano Aqil and Khairpur; Superintendent of Police Gulshan-e-Iqbal Karachi, Central District Karachi, Headquarters Garden Karachi; Senior Superintendent of Police (Security) Karachi; District Police Officer Nasirabad, Balochistan, SSP Operations Quetta; Chief Traffic Officer Lahore; Additional Inspector General Training, Punjab Police; City Police Officer Gujranwala; DIG Operations Lahore, Regional Police Officer Sahiwal, and Regional Police Officer, Faisalabad. He retired from police service on 22 April 2023.

In November 2022, Dogar was suspended by the Government of Pakistan for failing to provide security to Governor of Punjab, Pakistan. In December 2022, he was reinstated by the Supreme Court of Pakistan. Two months later, in February 2023, an audio clip was leaked of a conversation between him and Pakistan Tehreek-e-Insaf (PTI) leader Dr Yasmin Rashid about his posting. This further fuelled the controversy surrounding his appointment and its political implications. Later, his transfer from Lahore City was also suspended by the Supreme Court of Pakistan. In April 2023, after much controversy, he took retirement from police service.
