= List of cases of law enforcement brutality in Pakistan =

This is a list of notable cases of law enforcement brutality, including police brutality (Urdu: پولیس گردی) in Pakistan.

- 1960 – Communist leader Hassan Nasir was killed during interrogation in Lahore Fort.
- 1980 – Communist leader Nazeer Abbasi was one of many who died under interrogation during the martial law of Muhammad Zia-ul-Haq.
- 2010 – In protests by the Hazara Province Movement, several protesters were shot dead and dozens were injured by Khyber Pakhtunkhwa Police in Abbottabad.
- 2011 – In the Kharotabad incident, five Russians and one Tajik were shot dead by Frontier Corps and police after being falsely reported as suicide bombers when approaching a border checkpoint. Dr. Baqir Shah, a police surgeon who testified against the police, was attacked at a restaurant in Quetta, and later shot dead by unknown gunmen.
- 2014 – In Lahore incident, Punjab Police opened firing on protesters, killing 14 and injuring hundreds.
- 2015 – Two young brothers, Zeshan and Shakeel, were killed in police firing near the Holy Family Hospital in Rawalpindi. Sources claim Zeshan and Shakeel were shot several times after failing to stop at a police checkpoint. One of them died instantly while other died later in hospital. Both victims were unarmed.
- 2018 – Naqeebullah Mehsud was killed by Rao Anwar, a Senior Superintendent in the Karachi Police, in an encounter killing.
- 2019 – A family was killed in Sahiwal by the Counter Terrorism Department in an encounter killing.
- 2021 – 22 year old university student, Usama Nadeem, was shot multiple times by police after failing to stop. His father stated: "My son was shot multiple times. The anti-terror squad openly committed terrorism by aiming at the windscreen instead of the tires".
