= Mohammad Aamir Zulfiqar Khan =

Pakistani civil servant

- Occupation: Police officer
- Office: Former Inspector General of the Punjab Police
- Predecessor: Faisal Shahkar
- Successor: Usman Anwar

Mohammad Aamir Zulfiqar Khan is a Pakistani civil servant who served as Inspector General (IGP) of the Punjab Police from December 2022 to January 2023.

== Career ==
In the midst of political turmoil in Punjab, Khan was appointed as the new Punjab Inspector General (IG) by the federal government, replacing Faisal Shahkar. His appointment was made through a formal notification by the Establishment Division, which stated that Khan was serving at the time as the Deputy Director General of the Anti-Narcotics Force (ANF).

Zulfiqar has held various significant positions within the police force, including IG of National Highways and Motorway Police, IG of Islamabad Police, Punjab Additional IG Operations, DIG Operations Lahore, RPO Multan, DIG CTD Punjab, DIG Operations, and CPO Punjab. He has also served in Sindh, Punjab, Khyber Pakhtunkhwa, and with the federal government.

He belongs to the 19th Common of Pakistan Administrative Service.
