= Saeed Wazir =

Pakistani civil servant

Muhammad Saeed Wazir
- محمد سعید وزیر

OSD (Officer On Special Duty)
- Incumbent
- Assumed office Aug 2025
- Preceded by: Mujeebur Rehman

Personal details
- Education: Cadet College Razmak

Military service
- Allegiance: Civil Service Pakistan
- Branch/service: Police Service Pakistan
- Rank: Inspector General
- Battles/wars: War on terror

Muhammad Saeed Wazir (Urdu: محمد سعید وزیر) is a Pakistani civil servant and police officer who served on various important posts, including Inspector General of Gilgit-Baltistan Police from March 2021 till March 2023.

Wazi belongs to Wāṇa, South Waziristan, Khyber Pakhtunkhwa. He has also served in Punjab Police, Khyber Pakhtunkhwa Police, Balochistan Police and the National Highways and Motorway Police.
