= Imran Riaz Khan =

Pakistani journalist (born 1975)

Imran Riaz Khan عمران ریاض خان
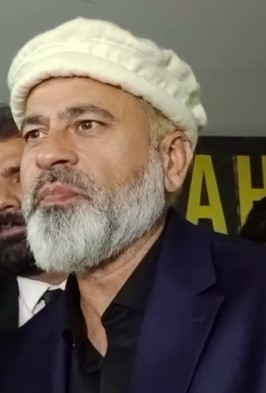
- Khan in December 2023
- Born: 14 August 1975 (age 51); Faisalabad, Punjab, Pakistan

YouTube information
- Channel: Imran Riaz Khan
- Years active: 2020–present
- Genre: News
- Subscribers: 6.45 million
- Views: 2.52 billion
- Last updated: 1 September 2026

Imran Riaz Khan (Note: Urdu: عمران ریاض خان) (born 14 August 1975) is a Pakistani journalist.

On 11 May 2023, Khan was reported to have been arrested by police while travelling in Pakistan. Media reports suggested that Imran's abduction may have been connected to him speaking out against the government and military. Given the context of enforced disappearances targeting critics, dissenters, and journalists in Pakistan, reports about Imran's situation raised concerns about his safety and well-being, including the possibility of mistreatment or even death as per reports. Human rights organisations such as Amnesty International requested for an urgent transparent and thorough investigation into his disappearance.

Imran Riaz was recovered and reunited with his family in September 2023, after over four months of disappearance, and was rearrested on 23 February 2024. In January 2025, Khan he relocated to the United Kingdom.

== Early life and education ==
He was born into a Punjabi-Kashmiri family on 14 August 1975 in Faisalabad, Punjab and after getting his early education at the Lahore Grammar School he studied mass communication at the Punjab University.

== Professional career ==
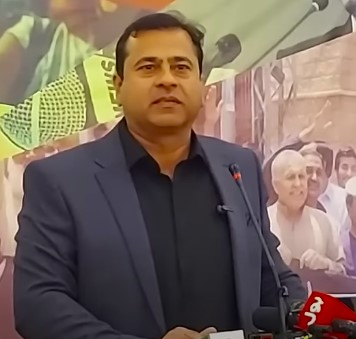
Khan in February 2023

He started his career as a crime reporter for a local newspaper.

Later, he became a news anchor on Express News channel. As a current affairs host he has also worked with the television channels GNN and Samaa TV.

He started his YouTube channel "Imran Riaz Khan" in 2020, which as of October 2022 has more than 6.18M million subscribers.

== Arrests ==
=== First arrest ===
While entering Islamabad Toll Plaza on 5 July 2022, he was driving to the federal capital to get bail from the Islamabad High Court and was arrested when Punjab Police surrounded his car before he could pass out of Punjab jurisdiction, despite being aware of court orders by the Islamabad and Lahore High Courts, and issuances of protective pre-arrest bail grants, intended to avoid an arrest of the journalist. Riaz later uploaded a video on YouTube stating that if he is not released, he will release the names of everyone who is behind the alleged regime change operation in which foreign influence provoked a constitutional crisis, ultimately ending with the PTI government of Imran Khan being ousted, when the former Prime Minister was removed from office in what he calls an "American conspiracy" against the sovereignty of Pakistan.

A day before his arrest, Riaz was critical of the Shehbaz Sharif-led government and uploaded a video to YouTube, in which Dawn News said Riaz "directly addressed Chief of Army Staff General Qamar Javed Bajwa and alleged that he was threatened after asking questions from military sources about the country's current political and economic situation." Riaz also indicated that his family is the target of threats.

Former Prime Minister of Pakistan Imran Khan strongly protested the "arbitrary arrest" and called on the public as well as the media to "unite and stand up against this fascism." Former official Asad Umar stated that PTI party workers will stage protests at press clubs throughout the country for what he said is an "attempt to suppress freedom of expression". Immediately following the arrest, reports showed a wide condemnation of the treatment and expressions of concern stemming from similar ideological grounds favoring free speech, including that of academic and activist Ammar Ali Jan, who warned of the irrationality in "clumsy" uses of force in a "battle of ideas."

He was released on bail on 9 July 2022, by Lahore High Courts' Judge Justice Baqar Najafi. His name was added to the Exit Control List by the FIA on the request of the police.

=== Second arrest ===
He was arrested again on 2 February 2023 on charges of "hate speech" and making a "violence-inducing statement" aimed at creating "a rift between the general public and the state institutions" and was released a week later.

=== Third arrest, disappearance, and recovery ===
In the aftermath of the May 9 riots, he was arrested once again by Punjab Police on 11 May 2023 from Sialkot Airport. The police later stated that he was released from jail the same night despite a detention notice of 30-days. After his release from jail, CCTV footage showed Riaz being abducted from outside the prison by 4–5 unidentified men who wore masks and forcibly put him inside a Toyota Vigo.

The matter of his recovery is subjudice in a case filed at Lahore High Court (LHC). The Chief Justice of the LHC Justice Muhammad Ameer Bhatti heard the case. During a hearing on 22 May 2023, the police chief of Punjab, Usman Anwar appeared clueless about the missing journalists whereabouts and asked for more time from the court to locate him. In another court hearing, Anwar said that no police station in Pakistan has Imran Riaz in their custody further stating that "No one has Imran Riaz (...) Imran Riaz Khan was not wanted by us. However, ‘agencies’ had asked for a police van. Why they had asked for a police van, [the court] can summon the agencies and ask." The agencies here being a euphemism for Pakistan's intelligence apparatus.

On 27 May 2023, Daniel Bastard of the France-based global watchdog Reporters Without Borders said that it had received information from diplomatic sources that the missing journalist was tortured by in the custody of Pakistan's military intelligence agencies and may even have died in detention.

On 30 May 2023, Usman Anwar claimed in court that Afghan SIMs were used by Imran Riaz's abductors and that the police was unable to trace them. Anwar also informed the court that a special working group was established by Punjab Police to recover the missing journalist.

On 25 September 2023, the Inspector General of Punjab Police Usman Anwar confirmed that Khan was now "safe at home" after having been missing for more than four months. Khan had lost 22 kilograms (49 lb) weight during his disappearance and was struggling to speak coherently.

=== Fourth arrest ===
In the early hours of 23 February 2024, in a raid on his residence, Imran was arrested for a fourth time by a contingent of Punjab Police. He was arrested on allegations of corruption and sent on a 14-day judicial remand. He said that handcuffs were being slapped on his wrists in order to "pay salute to the queen" — an apparent reference to PML-N's Maryam Nawaz. He received bail and had started uploading videos on YouTube again.
