= Usman Anwar =

Director General Federal Investigation Agency

DG FIA Usman Anwar HI(C)
- عثمان انور

Director General Federal Investigation Agency
- In office 03 February 2026 – Incumbent
- Appointed by: Government of Pakistan
- Preceded by: Raja Riffat Mukhtar

Inspector General of the Punjab Police
- In office 24 January 2023 – 02 February 2026
- Preceded by: Mohammad Aamir Zulfiqar Khan
- Succeeded by: Rao Abdul Kareem

Personal details
- Awards: Hilal-e-Imtiaz
- Police career
- Allegiance: Pakistan
- Branch: Punjab Police
- Service years: 1995 - present
- Status: Active
- Rank: Inspector General of Police

Usman Anwar is a Pakistani police officer who has been serving as the Director General of the Federal Investigation Agency (FIA) since 3 February 2026. He was the Inspector General of the Punjab Police in the province of Punjab from 24 January 2023 until 2 February 2026, and had earlier served as Director of the FIA Lahore branch.

== Career ==
Anwar joined Punjab Police in 1995. He had been serving as the Additional Inspector General (AIG) of the National Highways & Motorway Police before his appointment as the Punjab Inspector General of Police (IGP) in January 2023. Anwar has held various positions within the police force in Pakistan, including serving as an Additional IG of the Special Branch in Punjab, and as the District Police Officer (DPO) of Okara and Sargodha. He has also worked in the Telecommunication and Elite Police departments. He belongs to an Arain family of Punjab.

Anwar's appointment as the Punjab IGP was part of a significant bureaucratic reshuffle by the federal government, which saw him replace Mohammad Aamir Zulfiqar Khan, who was ordered to report to the Establishment Division in Islamabad. Alongside Anwar's appointment, Ghulam Muhammad Dogar was removed from his positions as the Capital City Police Officer (CCPO) of Lahore and as the convener of a Joint Investigation Team (JIT) investigating an attack on Imran Khan, head of the Pakistan Tehreek-e-Insaf (PTI) party.

He is a recipient of the Hilal-i-Imtiaz.

== Controversies ==
=== Killing of Ali Bilal ===
A special needs supporter of PTI, Ali Bilal alias Zille Shah, was arrested by Punjab Police from outside Zaman Park on 9 March 2023. He was last videoed alive in a police van before his dead body was brought to the hospital. The autopsy report revealed that Bilal was tortured and had excessive bleeding from a head injury. Anwar, in a press conference, claimed that Bilal was released the same day and was a victim of a traffic accident. PTI, including its chief, Imran Khan claimed that Bilal had died of custodial torture and demanded a judicial inquiry.

=== Crackdown against PTI ===
In the aftermath of the May 9 riots, Punjab Police initiated a crackdown against PTI under Anwar's watch. Leaders and workers of PTI were arrested and frivolously rearrested after being released by courts. Rights groups, including Amnesty International, raised concern over arbitrary arrests, custodial torture, and forced disappearances through police and other government agencies. The families of PTI leaders who had gone underground were also harassed in police raids that saw the looting and pillaging of their houses, as well as abduction of relatives.

=== Abduction of Imran Riaz Khan ===
A well-known journalist, Imran Riaz Khan, was arrested by Punjab Police. Despite a 30-day detention order, he was released the same night and was abducted by unknown people from outside Sialkot Central Jail where he was incarcerated. In a sub judice case, Anwar, expressed his inability to locate the journalist and put the onus on Pakistan's military intelligence agencies for his disappearance.

=== Interference in the electoral process ===
In an unprecedented move, during the candidature phase of 2024 Pakistani general election, Punjab Police was engaged in direct meddling in the electoral process. It was involved in snatching nomination papers from several applicants belonging to the PTI while outright blocking several others from entering the returning officer's (RO) office to collect them. In the next stage, during the scrutiny of the submitted nomination papers, proposers and seconders of the applicants from PTI, were abducted by police officers from outside RO offices as they came to aid their supported candidates. In some cases, even the aspiring candidates were arbitrarily arrested.
