= Hoon Dhamial =

- Village
- Location within Pakistan
- Coordinates: 33.32°N 73.13°E
- Country: Pakistan
- Province: Islamabad Capital Territory
- Time zone: UTC+5 (PST)

Hon Dhamial or Hoon Dahmyal is a village east of Islamabad in Pakistan near the Police Training College Sihala. The main tribe of the village is Mathyals. Other tribes in the village include the Hon and Dhamial..Its geographical coordinates 33.32 N,73.13 E.
