= Police Qaumi Razakars =

Police Qaumi Razakars (PQR) قومی رضاکار
- Abbreviation: PQR

Agency overview
- Formed: 1965
- Dissolved: 1 July 2022
- Employees: 24,613 (volunteers at time of disbandment)
- Annual budget: Rs 350 million (TA head) + Rs 170 million (uniform head)

Jurisdictional structure
- Operations jurisdiction: Punjab, PK
- Legal jurisdiction: Province of Punjab (in aid of police)
- Governing body: Government of Punjab, Pakistan
- General nature: Civilian police

Operational structure
- Headquarters: Lahore, Punjab
- Parent agency: Punjab police

The Police Qaumi Razakars (Urdu: پولیس قومی رضاکار) or Razakars was a volunteer police force in Punjab, Pakistan. Established under the Punjab Qaumi Razakars Ordinance of 1965, its duties included assisting the Punjab Police with the maintenance of law and order, public security, and dealing with natural calamities.

The force consisted of 24,613 razakars (lit. volunteers) with an annual budget of Rs 350 million for traveling allowances and Rs 170 million for uniforms.

The entire force was disbanded in 2022 across all districts following numerous complaints of corruption and misconduct. Volunteers were accused of using the uniform to extort bribes and committing crimes such as mobile phone and purse snatching.

== See also ==
- Law enforcement in Pakistan
