= Sohail Habib =

Pakistani civil servant and police officer

Sohail Habib Tajik
- سہیل حبیب تاجک

Inspector General of Azad Kashmir Police
- Incumbent
- Assumed office June 2021

Personal details
- Education: Khyber Medical College (MBBS) London School of Economics (MS)
- Profession: Civil servant, police officer
- Awards: Tamgha-e-Imtiaz

Sohail Habib Tajik (Urdu: سہیل حبیب تاجک) is a Pakistani civil servant and police officer who served as Inspector General of Azad Kashmir Police from June 2021 until May 2024. He belongs to district Charsadda. He is a graduate of Khyber Medical College. He completed his MS from London School of Economics, UK. He was best probationer on National Police Academy and was awarded the Tamgha-e-Imtiaz. He has served all over Pakistan in different roles. He is well known for his services in education and has helped set up schools in the under-developed areas of Pakistan.
