= Law enforcement in Pakistan =

Law enforcement in Pakistan (Urdu: پاکستان میں نفاذِ قانون) is one of the three main components of the criminal justice system of Pakistan, alongside the judiciary and the prisons. The country has a mix of federal, provincial and territorial police forces with both general and specialised functions, but the senior ranks of all the provincial forces and most of the federal ones are manned by members of the Police Service of Pakistan (PSP). The PSP is one of the most prestigious part of the Central Superior Services, Pakistan's main civil service organisation. Federal law enforcement agencies are generally overseen by the Ministry of Interior of the Government of Pakistan, while provincial police forces are overseen by a department of the government of that province.

== Overview ==
=== Federal Law Enforcement ===
- Federal Board of Revenue
  - Directorate General of Intelligence and Investigation
  - Pakistan Customs
- National Cyber Crimes Investigation Agency
- National Highways and Motorway Police
- National Counter Terrorism Authority
- National Agri-trade and Food Safety Authority
  - Animal Quarantine Department
  - Department of Plant Protection
- Federal Investigation Agency
- Pakistan Railways Police
- Financial Monitoring Unit
- National Accountability Bureau
- Airports Security Force
- Anti-Narcotics Force

=== Training and Policy ===
- National Academy for Prisons Administration
- National Police Academy
- National Police Bureau

=== Police Forces ===
- Islamabad Police
- Balochistan Police
- Khyber Pakhtunkhwa Police
- Gilgit-Baltistan Police
- Azad Kashmir Police
- Sindh Police
- Punjab Police

== Provincial and territorial police ==
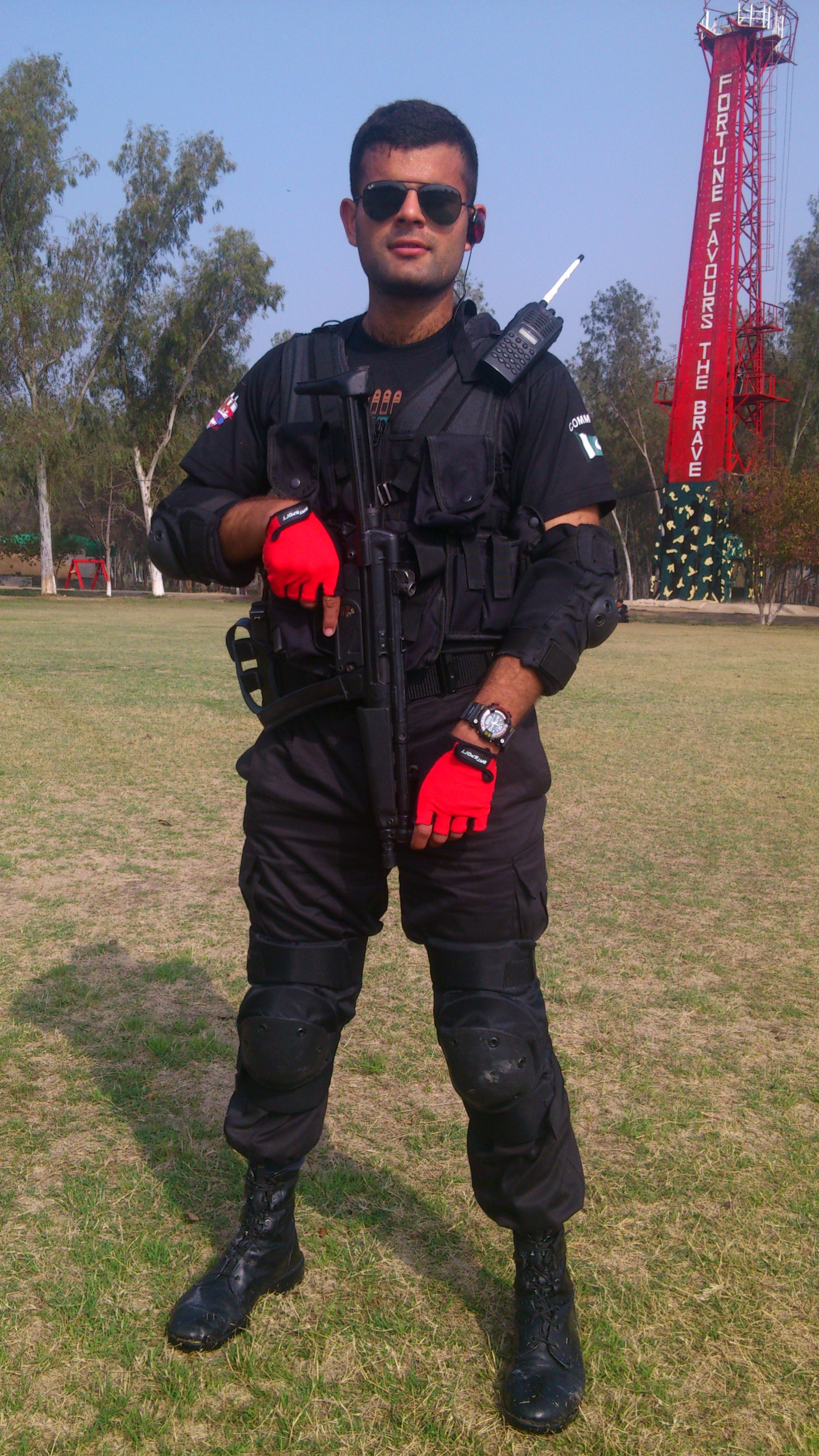
An officer of Elite Police of the Punjab Police

The four provinces of Pakistan (Punjab, Khyber Pakhtunkhwa, Sindh and Balochistan) each have their own police force, organised to suit the challenges of that locality, with their own specialised and elite units. Each police force has a Commissioner of Police appointed as Inspector-General who is a senior officer from the Police Service of Pakistan. Some provincial police forces are routinely supported by federal paramilitary units operating in that area. All provincial police forces contain Counter Terrorism Department and Special Branch.

The traditional uniform of Pakistani provincial police officers is a black shirt with tan trousers. In 2017, police in Punjab transitioned to an olive green uniform, but reverted to the traditional uniform in 2019. In 2020, all provinces decided to adopt the uniform worn in Islamabad - light blue or white shirts with dark blue trousers.

=== Balochistan ===
- The Balochistan Police used to operate in only 7 districts of Balochistan province but now operate in all districts.
- The Balochistan Constabulary is a reserve police unit of the Balochistan Police.
- The Balochistan Levies is a paramilitary police force operating in 23 of Balochistan's 30 districts. It is now merged into the Balochistan police.

=== Khyber Pakhtunkhwa ===
- The Khyber Pakhtunkhwa Police is the main civilian police force in Khyber Pakhtunkhwa province.
- The Reserve Frontier Police acts as the reserve unit of the KP Police.
- The Special Combat Unit is for counter-terrorism operations.
- Khyber Pakhtunkhwa Levies (11,739 personnel) are raised by provincial or local governments to provide additional security in their areas. They include:
  - Dir Levies
  - Malakand Levies
- The Levies and the Khasadar Forces have been absorbed into the Khyber Pakhtunkhwa Police or pensioned off.

=== Punjab ===
- The Punjab Police operates in the Punjab province.
  - Crime Control Department
  - The Dolphin Force deals with street crime.
  - The Elite Police performs counter-terrorism operations.
  - The Police Qaumi Razakars are a support force for the Punjab Police in their duties.
  - Punjab Constabulary
- Punjab Highway Patrol
- Punjab Prisons manage 43 prisons.
- PERA Force enforces laws related to price control, hoarding, encroachments etc.

=== Sindh ===
- The Sindh Police operates in the Sindh province.
- The Special Security Unit is a specialized counterterrorism and security unit, based in Karachi, with operational jurisdiction extending throughout Sindh. The SSU was established in 2010 in response to increased rates of terrorism.

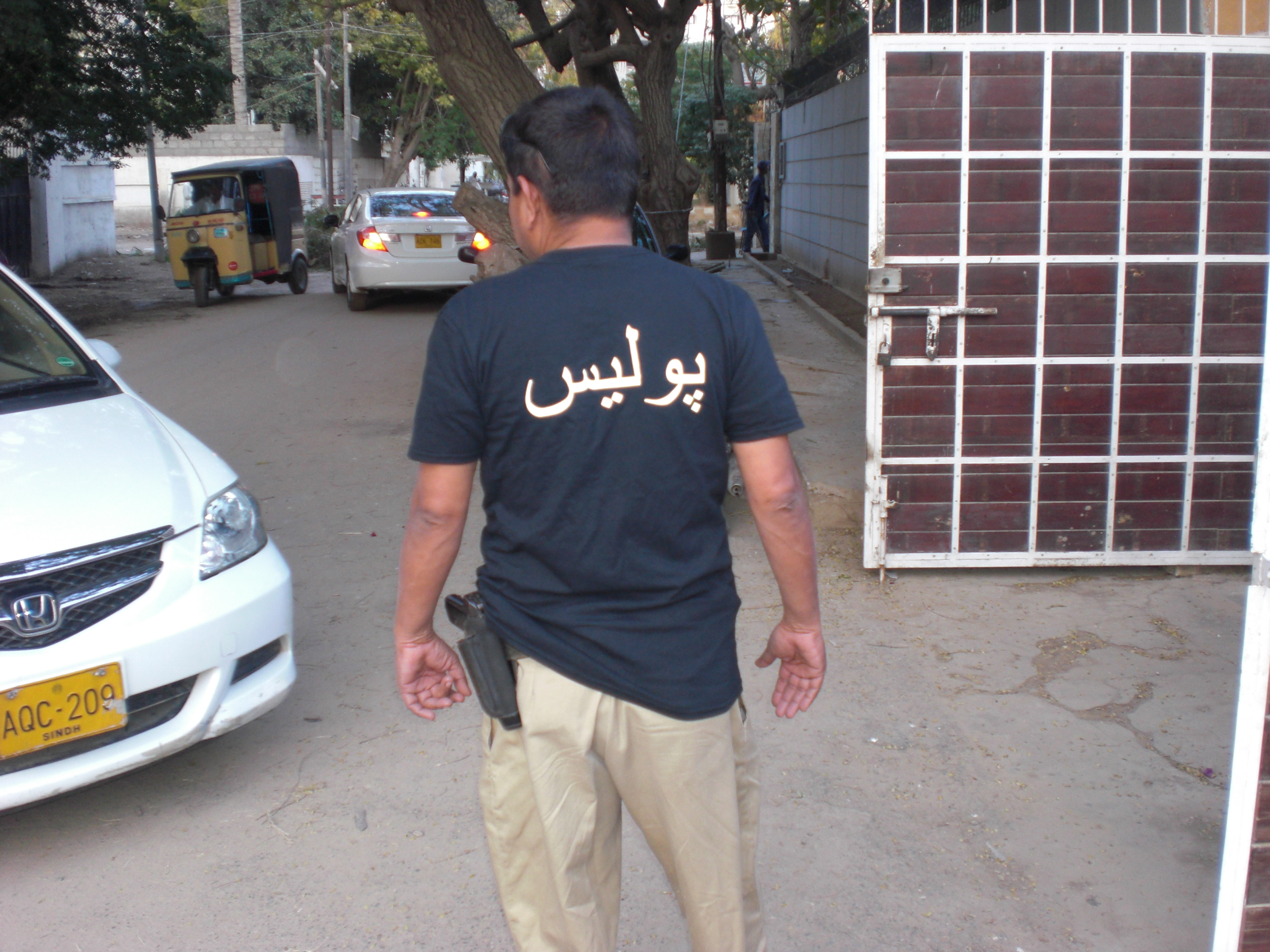
An officer of the Sindh Police

=== Territories ===
Pakistan's capital has its own Islamabad Police and subordinate units such as Islamabad Traffic Police (ITP). The Azad Kashmir Police operates in the semi-autonomous Azad Kashmir. The Gilgit-Baltistan Police operates in the semi-autonomous Gilgit-Baltistan region.

== Police Service of Pakistan (PSP) ==
Police Service of Pakistan
- Common name: Pakistan Police
- Abbreviation: PSP

Agency overview
- Formed: 1948
- Preceding agency: Indian Imperial Police

Jurisdictional structure
- Operations jurisdiction: PAK
- Governing body: Ministry of Interior
- General nature: Civilian police

Notables
- Award: Police honorary ribbon

The Police Service of Pakistan (PSP) replaced the Indian Imperial Police in 1948, a year after Pakistan became independent from the British Raj. The service commands and provides leadership to federal, provincial, and territorial police forces. Its officers are assigned to different districts, provinces and stations across Pakistan. Many of the country's highest-profile law enforcement posts are held by PSP officers, including Inspectors General of provinces, Director Generals of the Intelligence Bureau and Federal Investigation Agency, and superintendents of the Federal Constabulary and National Highways and Motorway Police. Officers are recruited through an extremely competitive examination held once a year by the Federal Public Service Commission. Those selected then must undergo a six month training programme known as CTP at the Civil Services Academy (CSA) in Lahore, and a further 18 months of specialised training occurs at the National Police Academy Islamabad.

Primarily operated through the four provincial governments and the Islamabad Capital Territory, each police service has a jurisdiction extending only within the relevant province or territory.

The law enforcement agencies are also involved in providing first response to emergencies and other threats to public safety as well as protecting the infrastructure and maintaining order in the country. Apart from investigating crime scenes, criminal acts, suspected unlawful activities, and detention of suspected criminals pending judicial action, the law enforcement agencies (primarily police) also perform duties that include the service and enforcement of warrants, writs, and other orders of the courts.

=== Designations of PSP officers ===
Grade	Police Ranks/Provincial Appointments	Secretarial/Federal Appointments
BPS-17	Assistant Superintendent of Police; Assistant Superintendent of Counter Terrorism Department (ASP CTD); Deputy Superintendent of Police; Deputy Superintendent of Counter Terrorism Department (DSP CTD); Sub-Divisional Police Officer (SDPO) of a Sub-division.; Assistant Director, Special Security Unit (SSU)	Assistant Director, Intelligence Bureau; Assistant Director, Anti-Narcotics Force; Assistant Director, Financial Monitoring Unit; Assistant Director, Federal Investigation Agency; Assistant District Officer, Federal Constabulary; Assistant Superintendent of Police National Highways & Motorways Police (ASP NH & MP); Assistant Superintendent of Pakistan Railway Police (ASP PRP)
BPS-18	Additional Superintendent of Police; Superintendent of Police; Superintendent of Counter Terrorism Department (SP CTD); District Police Officer (DPO) of smaller districts; SP Dolphin Force (only in Punjab); City Police Officer (CPO) of a smaller division or a smaller provincial capital like Gilgit, Muzzafarabad, Quetta etc.	Deputy Director, Intelligence Bureau; Deputy Director, Anti-Narcotics Force; Deputy Director, Financial Monitoring Unit; Deputy Director, Federal Investigation Agency; District Officer, Federal Constabulary (DO FC); Superintendent of Police National Highways & Motorways Police (SP NH & MP); Superintendent of Pakistan Railway Police (SP PRP)
BPS-19	Assistant Inspector General of Police (AIGP); Senior Superintendent of Police (SSP); Senior Superintendent of Counter Terrorism Department (SSP CTD); Additional Director, Special Security Unit (AD SSU); District Police Officer (DPO) of larger districts like Sukkur, Sargodha, Sialkot.; City Police Officer (CPO) of a larger cities or a division, Lahore, Rawalpindi, Hyderabad, Faisalabad etc.	Director, Intelligence Bureau; Joint Director, Anti-Narcotics Force; Additional Director, Federal Investigation Agency; Course Commander, National Police Academy; Director, National Police Academy; Additional Director, Financial Monitoring Unit; Additional Director, National Crisis Management Cell; District Officer, Federal Constabulary of larger districts, in Islamabad, Karachi, and Peshawar.; Senior Superintendent of Police of National Highways & Motorways Police (SSP NH & MP); Senior Superintendent of Pakistan Railway Police (SSP PRP)
BPS-20	Deputy Inspector General of Police (DIGP); Deputy Inspector General of Counter Terrorism Department (DIG CTD); Director, Special Security Unit (SSU); Regional Police Officer (RPO) of a division; (CCPO) of the provincial capitals including Quetta, Peshawar, Muzzafarabad and Gilgit	Director, Anti-Narcotics Force; Director General, NACTA Headquarters; Director, Federal Investigation Agency; Director, Financial Monitoring Unit; Deputy Commandant, Federal Constabulary; Deputy Director General, Intelligence Bureau; Director, National Crises Management Cell; Deputy Commandant, National Police Academy; Director, National Police Bureau; Director, National Police Academy; Deputy Inspector General of Police of Pakistan Railway Police (DIG PRP); Deputy Inspector General National Highways & Motorways Police (DIG NH & MP)
BPS-21	Additional Inspector General of Police (Addl.IGP); Additional Inspector General of Counter Terrorism Department (Addl.IG CTD); Capital City Police Officer (CCPO) of the larger provincial capitals, Karachi and Lahore.; Inspector General of Police of smaller territories or regions, Azad Jammu & Kashmir Police (IG AJK Police), Gilgit Baltistan Police (IG GB Police) and Islamabad Capital Territory Police (IG ICT Police)	Deputy Director General, Anti-Narcotics Force (DDG ANF); Managing Director, National Police Foundation (MD NPF); Director General, National Police Bureau (DG NPB); Director General, Financial Monitoring Unit (DG FMU); Joint Director General, Intelligence Bureau (JDG IB); Director General, National Crises Management Cell (DG NCMC); Additional Director General, Federal Investigation Agency (Addl.DG FIA); Deputy National Coordinator, National Counter Terrorism Authority (Deputy NC of NACTA); Additional Inspector General of Police of Pakistan Railway Police (Addl.IG PRP); Additional Inspector General National Highways & Motorways Police (Addl. IG NH & MP)
BPS-22	Inspector General of Police; Provincial Police Officers of Punjab, Sindh, KP and Balochistan (PPO/IG of the Province) (e.g IG Sindh)	Secretary, Narcotics Control Division; National Coordinator, National Counter Terrorism Authority (NC NACTA); Director General, Intelligence Bureau (DG IB); Director General, Federal Investigation Agency (DG FIA); Director General, National Police Bureau (DG NPB); Inspector General, Pakistan Railways Police (IG PRP); Commandant, National Police Academy (Commandant NPA); Commandant, Federal Constabulary (Commandant FC); Inspector General National Highways & Motorways Police (IG NH & MP)

== See also ==
- Federal Security Force, a defunct law enforcement agency
- Civil Armed Forces
- List of cases of law enforcement brutality in Pakistan
- Crime in Pakistan
- Organised crime in Pakistan
