= Pakistan CID building attack =

2010 terrorist incident in Karachi, Pakistan

- Location: Karachi, Sindh, Pakistan
- Date: 11 November 2010
- Target: Criminal Investigation Department headquarters
- Attack type: Truck bombing, mass shooting, grenade attack
- Weapons: Truck bomb, guns, grenades
- Deaths: 18
- Injuries: 100
- Perpetrators: Tehrik-i-Taliban Pakistan, Lashkar-e-Jhangvi (suspected)

The CID building attack was a gun, grenade and truck bomb attack by militants targetting Criminal Investigation Department personnel in Karachi, Sindh, Pakistan on 11 November 2010. Initial reports indicated that the building housing the CID office had been badly damaged and a blast crater of 5 metres reported in close proximity. At least 18 people were killed and 100 injured, and the casualty figures were reportedly expected to rise. The internationally designated terrorist group Tehrik-i-Taliban Pakistan claimed responsibility for the attack through Azam Tariq, their spokesman. However, the involvement of Lashkar-e-Jhangvi was also contested with interior minister Rehman Malik appearing sure of the possibility.

== Attack ==
The attack was coordinated on the headquarters of (CID), which is responsible for anti-terrorism operations, in what is described as the city's "highest security zone" – metres away from the house of the provincial Chief Minister of Sindh and two five-star hotels. According to Tariq, the attack was carried out in retaliation for the continued drone attacks in northwest Pakistan. Authorities reported that five to six people were seen throwing grenades and firing at the gate of the building, consequently killing the guards posted there; moments later, a vehicle packed with explosives made its way inside and exploded just metres away from the building, causing damage and destruction to nearby structures as well. Additionally, other witnesses reported that prior to the blast, a gunfight had taken place between heavily armed militants and security forces; a local resident remarked that this firing continued for 20 minutes before the explosion had occurred.

== See also ==
- List of terrorist incidents, 2010
