= Punjab Highway Patrol =

Pakistani highway police agency

Punjab Highway Patrol Urdu: پنجاب شاہراہ گشت
- Abbreviation: PHP
- Motto: Safe Highways Urdu: محفوظ شاہراہیں

Agency overview
- Formed: 8 January 2003

Jurisdictional structure
- Operations jurisdiction: Punjab, Pakistan
- Area: 205,344 km^{2} (79,284 sq mi)
- Population: 81.8 Million
- Legal jurisdiction: Punjab
- General nature: Civilian police

Operational structure
- Headquarters: Lahore, Punjab
- Agency executive: Abdul Kareem, Additional IGP PHP
- Parent agency: Punjab Police (Pakistan)

Website
- php.punjab.gov.pk

The Punjab Highway Patrol (Urdu: پنجاب شاہراہ گشت; reporting name: PHP) is the specialized law enforcement agency responsible for securing Provincial Highways in Punjab. The PHP patrol these roads to ensure highways safety and prevent crime, especially in rural areas. Recently, in many districts, some of the patrolling units have also been authorized to issue tickets for traffic violations.

== History ==
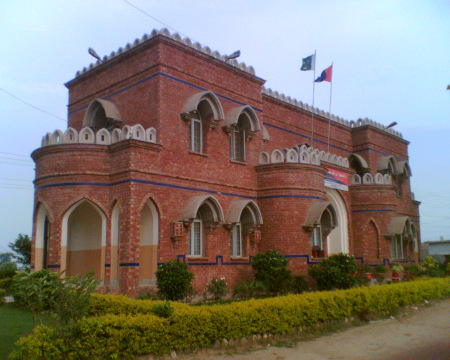
PHP Posts.

The Chief Minister of the Punjab announced the establishment of Patrolling Posts on the highways throughout the province on 8 January 2003. The object was to provide security to the people traveling on the highways and improve thana (Police Station) culture. 450 Patrolling Post would be established in two phases. By 31 March 2005 more than 190 posts have become operational and others will soon be commissioned. More than 11,500 constables have been recruited and trained in two years. They receive a special pay package which is almost twice that of the regular police. The Punjab Highway Patrol is headed by an officer of the rank of an Additional Inspector-General of Police.

== Head of Organization ==
- Additional Inspectors General of police is the Head of Punjab Highway Patrol.
- The list of heads of this unit who commanded this organisation of Punjab Police is as under:

| Name of Officers | From | To |
|---|---|---|
| Mr. Tariq Saleem PSP | 4 August 2006 | 7 May 2007 |
| Mr. Javed Noor PSP | 7 May 2007 | 26 January 2008 |
| Mr. Muhammad Altaf Qamar PSP PPM | 25 February 2008 | 4 June 2008 |
| Mr. Muhammad Zahid Mahmood PSP | 4 June 2008 | 8 March 2009 |
| Mr. Mirza Muhammad Yasin PSP | 8 March 2009 | 3 April 2009 |
| Mr. Zahid Mahmood PSP | 3 April 2009 | 13 May 2009 |
| Mr. Mohammad Wasim PSP | 13 May 2009 | 31 January 2011 |
| Mr. Humayun Raza Shafi PSP | 21 February 2011 | 14 June 2011 |
| Mr. Khan Baig PSP | 16 June 2011 | 2 January 2013 |
| Mr. Malik Khuda Bakhsh Awan PSP | 2 January 2013 | 8 April 2013 |
| Mr. Sohail Khan PSP | 12 April 2013 | 28 July 2014 |
| Mr. Mian Javed Islam PSP | 28 July 2014 | 8 October 2015 |
| Dr. Arif Mushtaq Chaudhary PSP | 13 October 2015 | 22 February 2016 |
| Mr. Amjad Javed Saleemi PSP | 22 February 2016 | 22 May 2018 |
| Mr. Kunwar Shahrukh PSP | 31 May 2018 | August 2018–present |
| Mr. Abubakar Khuda Bakhsh PSP | August 2018 | December 2018 |
| Mr. Ahmad Ishaque Jahangir PSP | December 2018 | February 2019 |
| Mr. Capt(R) Ahmad Latif PSP | February 2019 | April 2019 |
| Mr. Manzoor Sarwar Chaudhary PSP | April 2019 | November 2019 |
| Mr. Capt(R) Zafar Iqbal Awan PSP | November 2019 | – |

== Objectives ==
- Control crime on highways with a system of foot and mobile patrol within an area extending to 220 feet on either side of the designated highways
- Apprehend criminals and hand them over to the local police
- Preserve the crime scene and inform the local police after commission of an offence
- Take measures to control traffic accidents
- In case of accident, provide first aid to the injured and transport the seriously injured to hospital
- Serve as reporting centres and provide emergency help in the form of guidance and road-side assistance
- Keep the highways clear of encroachments in coordination with the competent authority
- Conduct effective nakabandi (picketing on roads/highways) to stop a suspect vehicle following a crime or an accident
- Check over-speeding and use of pressure horns in public service vehicles
- Ensure round the clock presence of uniformed, well trained, well educated, alert and vigilant force
- Traffic management on 12 Highways across the province

== Training ==
Training occurs at the Chohung Training Center in Lahore. In addition to regular police training, the personnel of the Punjab Highway Patrol have been given 1 month of elite police training, to deal with criminals. They have also been given instructions in the following areas:

- Character building
- Principles of patrolling
- Preservation of the scene of crime
- Stop, search and arrest
- First aid
- Public dealing / Community policing
- Safety and cleanliness.

== Uniform ==
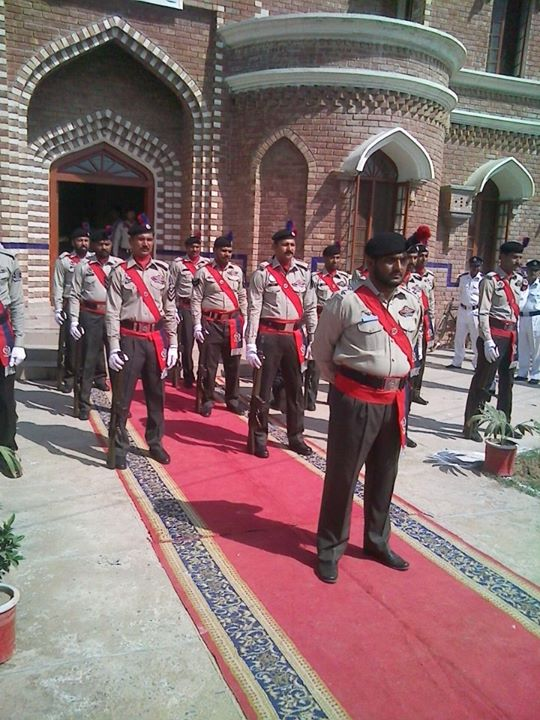
PHP Officers.

In order to distinguish Punjab Highway Patrol from general police a special uniform has been designed.

== Helpline ==
In case of emergencies for help/assistance, Punjab Highway Patrol has established a helpline 1124 for road commuters.

== Vehicles ==
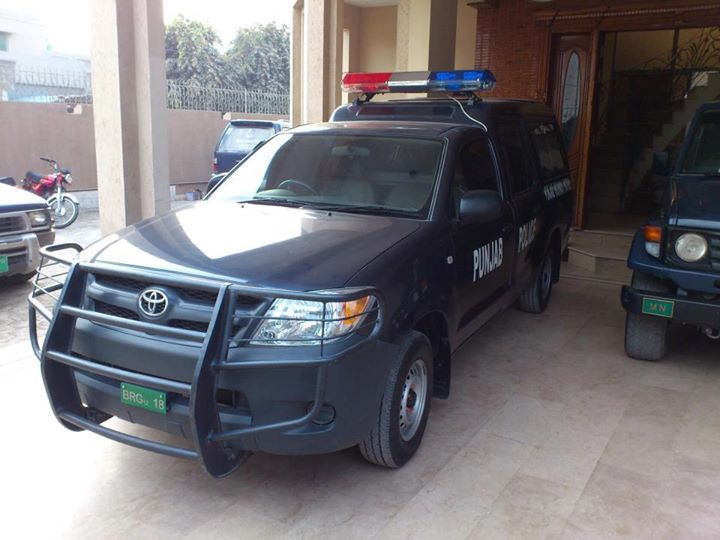
PHP Vehicles.

- Toyota Hilux (Single Cab & Double Cabin Vigo)

== Weapons ==
- AK 47
- H&K G3
- H&K MP5
- Glock pistols
- Beretta 92fs
- TT pistols
- shotguns

== See also ==
- Punjab Police (Pakistan)
- Provincial Highways of Punjab
- Elite Police
- National Highways & Motorway Police
