= Animal Quarantine Department =

Federal agency responsible for animal quarantine

Agency overview
- Formed: 1980
- Dissolved: 2025
- Superseding agency: National Agri-trade and Food Safety Authority
- Jurisdiction: Pakistan
- Headquarters: Animal Quarantine Department, 69/4,5-D, Nursery PECHS Block-6, Shahrah-e-Faisal, Karachi
- Annual budget: 104.315 Million PKR
- Federal Minister responsible: Syed Fakhar Imam
- Federal Secretary responsible: Dr. Muhammad Hashim Popalzai
- Agency executive: Director Dr. Muhammad Ilyas, Head of the Department (BPS-19)
- Website: aqd.gov.pk
- Agency ID: AQD

The Animal Quarantine Department (AQD) (Urdu: محکمہ برائے قرنطینہِ حیوانات) was an attached department of the Ministry of National Food Security and Research, responsible for animal quarantine, inspection and certification services in Pakistan. AQD was the lead agency for collaboration with other agencies to protect the wild animals and the livestock industry of Pakistan and other countries from introduction or spread of exotic diseases, by regulating the import, export and quarantine of animals and animal products. In 2025, it was replaced by the National Agri-trade and Food Safety Authority.

== History ==
In 1980, first Animal Quarantine Station (AQS) was formed at Karachi under Pakistan Animal Quarantine Ordinance 1979 and Pakistan Animal Quarantine Rules 1980. In addition Animal Quarantine Stations (AQSs) in federal capital of Islamabad and provincial capitals of Lahore, Peshawar and Quetta were established in between 1980 and 1988. In 1987, AQD was established as an attached department of Ministry of Food, Agriculture and Livestock. Furthermore, AQSs at Multan and Sialkot were formed in 1990 and 2001 respectively. In 2000–01, Laboratory for detection of drug residues in animal products was formed at Karachi. In April 2008, Government of Pakistan attached AQD to Ministry of Livestock & Dairy Development. But in May 2011, AQD became a part of Ministry of Commerce. And since October 2011, AQD is functioning as an attached department of Ministry of National Food Security & Research.

== Duties and responsibilities ==
Duties and responsibilities of AQD, as defined by Ministry of national food security and research, are:

- Regulate the import, export and quarantine of animals and animal products, in order to prevent the introduction or spread of exotic diseases.
- Maintain quarantine services of high standards, to protect the livestock industry of Pakistan and other countries.
- Provides certifications services to the exporters and importers.

== Services ==
Currently AQD offer following services:

- Issuance of Health Certificates for the Import/Export through inspection and quarantine.
- Registration of export oriented establishments for animals and animal products.
- Risk assessment for importation of animal and animal products in the light of national laws and international obligations.
- Laboratory testing of commodities meant for export and import.
