= Crime Control Department =

Crime investigation department in Punjab, Pakistan

- Abbreviation: CCD

Agency overview
- Formed: 26 February 2025
- Employees: 4,250 (2025)
- Annual budget: Rs 5.56 billion (2025)

Jurisdictional structure
- Operations jurisdiction: Punjab
- Legal jurisdiction: Provincial
- Governing body: Punjab Police
- Constituting instrument: Police (Amendment) Ordinance 2025

Operational structure
- Headquarters: Lahore, Punjab
- Elected officer responsible: Maryam Nawaz
- Agency executive: Additional Inspector General (Addl. IG), Head of CCD
- Parent agency: Punjab Police

Facilities
- Stations: Separate police stations under CCD

The Crime Control Department (CCD) is a special police unit and the premier investigation agency of the Pakistani province of Punjab. It falls under the jurisdiction of the Punjab Police, and was established in February 2025 by Chief Minister Maryam Nawaz through a provincial law amendment to deal with serious and organised crime in the province. It is working with the authority to establish an independent order, its own police station, and the first information reports (FIR).

== History ==
CCD was created in 2025 through an amendment to the Police Order 2002 via the Police (Amendment) Ordinance 2025. Its formation was aimed at improving the investigation and prosecution of high-profile crimes, including land grabbing, extortion, kidnapping, and organised gang activity.

In October 2025, CCD arrested gangster Teefi Butt who then escaped custody but was killed by the CCD the next day. The killing brought to light increased police encounters since the formation of the CCD, with the Human Rights Commission of Pakistan reporting 500 encounters and 670 fatalities as of October 2025. In December 2025, a petition was filed before the Lahore High Court, stating the CCD was using fake encounters to declare people criminals. As of the date of the petition, it was reported that approximately 1,100 people had been killed in police counters since the implementation of the CCD.

== Organisation ==
This section is led by an Additional Inspector General (Adel. IG), supported by Deputy Inspector General (DIGS), SSP, SPS and other officials. By 2025, about 4,250 employees are deployed under CCD in all districts of Punjab.

CCD investigates crimes such as murder, dacoity, extortion, vehicle theft and kidnapping for ransom. It runs its own police stations, uses modern surveillance tools, including drone and crime-mapping software, and collaborates with other security agencies where necessary.

The Punjab government has allocated Rs 5.56 billion for the establishment of CCD covering infrastructure, recruitment, equipment and IT systems.

== Criticism ==
According to Human Rights Commission of Pakistan (HRCP), in the 10 months between its foundation in February and December of 2025, CCD killed over 900 people under suspicious circumstances in over 670 encounters. HRCP has called CCD a "parallel police forces" granted virtual immunity which led to a significant rise in encounter killings. A February 2026 fact-finding report on the CCD concluded that it pursued "a systemic policy of extrajudicial killing in contravention of the law and Constitution."

The HRCP, citing police reports, says CCD teams routinely describe stopping "suspicious" motorcyclists at night who allegedly fire first and are killed in retaliatory fire, while accomplices escape. The HRCP notes near-identical FIR wording across cases, including claims that dying suspects disclosed personal details, and says police statements repeat this narrative while omitting procedural details.

== See also ==
- Counter Terrorism Department (Pakistan)
- Federal Investigation Agency
- Police training
- Punjab Police (Pakistan)
- Punjab Enforcement & Regulatory Authority
- Encounter killing
