= Elite Police =

Elite Police Force, Punjab
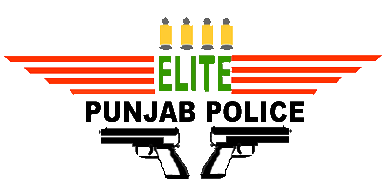
- Elite Police Insignia
- Active: 1998 - present
- Country: Pakistan
- Branch: Punjab Police (Pakistan)
- Type: Special Forces/Police Tactical Unit
- Role: Special Operations Force; Domestic Counter-Terrorism and Law Enforcement
- Nickname: Elite Police Force (EPF)
- Motto: Allahu Akbar
- Engagements: 2009 attack on the Sri Lanka national cricket team Lahore police academy attack

Commanders
- Additional Inspector General of Police: Muhammad Waqar Abbasi

The Elite Police (Urdu: اشرافیہ پولیس), also known as the "Elite Police Force" or "Police Commandos", is a branch of the Punjab Police specializing in counter-terrorist operations and VIP security duties, as well as acting against serious crime and performing high-risk operations which are generally not assigned to the regular police. Within the Elite Police, a specialized sub-unit known as the Special Operations Unit (SOU) conducts high-risk missions, including operations against the Tehreek-e-Taliban Pakistan (TTP), criminal networks in districts such as Dera Ghazi Khan and Rahim Yar Khan, and other extreme security situations such as hostage-rescue or anti-hijacking operations.

== History ==
The Elite Force was created on the order of the then Punjab Chief Minister Shahbaz Sharif in 1997–1998.

In 2004, more funds were allocated for its expansion, and 5000 new personnel were inducted. The Elite Force was allocated to new checkpoints across Punjab intended to curb street crime.

Their work drew attention in the wake of the 2009 attack on the Sri Lankan cricket team in Lahore.

== Organization ==
The Elite Police Force is headed by the Additional Inspector-General of Police.

Additional Inspector-General of Police is leading Elite Police Police Force in Punjab.

== Training ==
During operations, they are headed by an officer trained in a "Basic Elite" course.

The Elite Force is used in a range of special operations including "high-risk searches, raids and rescue operations".

Members undergo six months of training at the Elite Police Training School (EPTS) in Badian, Lahore, where they are instructed by special police trainers in personal combat, martial arts, crowd control, close-quarters battle (CQB), and reconnaissance.

They are trained in martial arts and boxing practice during training period.

== Equipment ==
Elite Police members are often seen in black and green track suits.

=== Small arms ===
Model	Type	Origin
Glock	Semi-automatic pistol	Austria
Beretta 92FS	Semi-automatic pistol	Italy
Benelli M4	Shotgun	Italy
Heckler & Koch MP5	Submachine gun	Germany
M4 carbine	Assault rifle	United States
Type 56	Assault rifle	China
HK G3	Assault rifle	Pakistan
PSR-90	Sniper rifle	Pakistan
MG3	Machine gun	Pakistan

=== Miscellaneous ===
- POF Eye
- Hand Grenades
- Smoke Grenades
- Binoculars
- Flak jackets
- Night vision goggles

== Head of Organization ==
The highest rank in the Elite Police is the rank of Additional Inspector General of Police. The following is the list of the Additional Inspector Generals of Police who have headed this unit.

No.	Name of Officer	From	To
1	Javed Noor, PSP	12-02-2007	07-05-2007
2	Tariq Saleem Dogar, PSP	07-05-2007	09-05-2008
3	Kalb-i-Abbas, PSP	08-03-2010	05-11-2011
4	Muhammad Tahir, PSP	10-06-2015	20-10-2015
5	Shahid Hanif, PSP PPM	23-02-2018	04-08-2018
6	Shahid Hanif, PSP PPM	29-10-2018	16-04-2020
7	Muhammad Farooq Mazhar, PSP	16-04-2020	25-03-2021
8	Kunwar Shahrukh, PSP	06-12-2021	27-12-2022
9	DR Muhammad Waqar Abbasi, PSP	21-08-2023	Till date

== Notable operations ==
The Elite Police were extensively involved in neutralizing enemy combatants who had laid siege to the Manawan Police Training School during the 2009 Lahore police academy attacks.

Mumtaz Qadri, the bodyguard who shot and killed Punjab governor Salmaan Taseer in Islamabad on January 4, 2011 was a member of the Elite Police.

On August 12, 2017 a twelve year old boy was crushed to death by Elite Force Vehicle accompanying Mr. Nawaz Sharif (ex-prime minister).

None of the vehicles including rescue vehicles or the vehicle responsible stopped or took the boy to the hospital. Family of the victim was also pressurized later to omit vehicle registration number from first information report to police.

== See also ==
- List of Special Response Units
- Elite Police Academy
