= National Police Academy (Pakistan) =

- Abbreviation: NPA
- Formation: 1978
- Location: Islamabad
- Members: Police Service of Pakistan
- Commandant: Muhammad Idrees Ahmed, PSP
- Parent organization: Government of Pakistan
- Website: https://npa.gov.pk/

The National Police Academy (NPA) (Urdu: قومی پولیس درسگاہ پاکستان) is a national institution for training of the Police Service of Pakistan officers who have been selected through the Central Superior Services examination. The trained officers on passing out hold the rank of Assistant Superintendent of Police. The academy is located in Islamabad.

== Organization ==
The academy is headed by a commandant, a Police Service of Pakistan officer of the rank of Inspector General of Police or Additional Inspector General of Police and assisted by a Deputy Commandant of the rank of Deputy Inspector General of Police. The Course Commander, who is an officer of the rank of Senior Superintendent of Police is in charge of the training of the Assistant Superintendents of Police. Director senior Command Course looks after the training of DPOs.
