= Special Branch (Pakistan) =

Branch of Pakistan police

- Special Branch logo of Punjab Police
- Common name: Special Branch
- Abbreviation: SB

Jurisdictional structure
- Operations jurisdiction: PK
- General nature: Civilian police

Special Branches (Urdu: سپیشل برانچ) are the intelligence units in the Police Service of Pakistan. It is a specialized unit in each provincial police force responsible for collecting and analyzing intelligence information within its territory. The Special Branches date back to the times of the British Raj and are controlled by the provincial governments. The unit is also responsible for background checks of government employees and VIP security.

== Structure ==
Each province has its own special branch of police and is responsible for collecting and analyzing intelligence information within its province. For administrative and operational efficiency, the Special Branch in Punjab is segmented into nine regions. Each region is headed by an officer holding the rank of Senior Superintendent or Superintendent of Police, overseeing the respective region's activities and operations. The Special Branch in Pakistan is overseen by an officer holding the rank of Additional Inspector General of Police. This officer is supported by four Deputy Inspectors-General of Police and a team consisting of senior superintendents, superintendents, deputy and assistant superintendents, as well as other supporting staff. The organization is structured into nine regions for administrative and operational efficiency, with each region led by an officer holding the rank of Senior Superintendent or Superintendent of Police. Moreover, the Special Branch maintains field offices across all districts within the province of Punjab.

== See also ==
- Intelligence Bureau (Pakistan), an intelligence unit at the federal level
- Inter-Services Intelligence, responsible for the strategic intelligence

== Sources ==
- Haqqani, H. (2010). Pakistan: Between Mosque and Military. Brookings Institution Press. ISBN 978-0-87003-285-1.
- Arain, Saima Manzoor; Arain, Akif Manzoor; Manzoor, Asif (2014). Police in Pakistan. Lulu.com. ISBN 978-1-105-99032-8.
