= Counter Terrorism Department (Pakistan) =

Counter-Terrorism Bureaus of the Provincial Pakistani Police Forces

Counter Terrorism Department محکمہ انسداد دہشت گردی
- Common name: CTD
- Motto: To fight terrorism in all its manifestations

Agency overview
- Formed: 21 July 2010

Jurisdictional structure
- Operations jurisdiction: Pakistan
- Governing body: Ministry of Interior; Provincial police services of Pakistan
- General nature: Civilian police
- Specialist jurisdiction: Counter terrorism, special weapons operations; protection of internationally protected persons, other very important persons, or state property

Operational structure
- Headquarters: Karachi (CTD Sindh); Peshawar (CTD KP) Lahore (CTD Punjab); Quetta (CTD Balochistan); Islamabad (CTD Islamabad); Muzaffarabad (CTD Azad Kashmir); Gilgit (CTD Gilgit-Baltistan)
- Agency executive: Additional IGP CTD, Punjab, Waseem Ahmed Khan (PSP); Additional IGP CTD, Sindh, Azad Khan (PSP); Additional IGP CTD, KPK, Shaukat Abbas (PSP); Deputy Inspector General (DIG) CTD, Balochistan, Ayetzaz Ahmed Goraya (PSP); Senior Superintendent of Police (SSP) CTD, Islamabad, Muhammad Iqbal
- Parent agency: Police Service of Pakistan

Counter Terrorism Departments (Urdu: محکمہ انسداد دہشت گردی, romanized: Mahkamah Ansadad Dahsht Gardi; CTD) are anti-terrorism, and intelligence bureaus of the provincial police services of Pakistan.

The CTDs are operational in all four provinces of Pakistan under the respective provincial Home Ministry. While Islamabad Police, Gilgit-Baltistan Police, Azad Kashmir Police also have their own CTD bureaus.

In Karachi, CTD teams have gathered intelligence to take action against organized crime, and, alongside the FIA and the IB, have infiltrated terrorist cells to track down TTP, Islamic State, al-Qaeda and other terror and separatist groups' operatives.

== History ==
The CTD was founded in the early 2000s as part of the larger efforts of President Pervez Musharraf to establish counter-terrorism institutions across Pakistan in light of the growing threat of terrorism the country was facing at the time. Counterterrorism institutions such as the National Counter Terrorism Authority (NACTA) had also been in the works of being established.

== Formation and organization ==
CTDs as per the framework of the National Action Plan are under the command of the respective provincial police departments. The CTD of the respective province now accumulate information, intelligence and carry out operations against the terrorist organizations.

There are presently four CTDs each named after their relevant jurisdictional province. These are the CTD Punjab, the CTD Khyber Pakhtunkhwa, the CTD Sindh, and the CTD Balochistan. Each of the CTD is either headed by the Additional Inspector General of Police (Additional IGP) or the Deputy Inspector General of Police (DIGP) depending on the size of the department. In the case of Punjab, Sindh and KP, it is often Additional IGP who heads the organization. CTD is then further subdivided into various sections and units which are led by the DIG or SSP rank officers who heads each section tasked with operations, Intelligence and Investigations.

Each provincial CTD is divided into various zones located at various Divisions of each province. For instance, CTD Sindh is divided into 5 zones i.e Karachi, Hyderabad, Sukkur, Larkana and Nawabshah. Each of the zones is either headed by an SSP or SP rank officer. These zones comprise CTD police stations located at various districts of each zone. The Police Station of the CTD is often headed by an Inspector or Sub-Inspector rank officer who is called as Station House Officer (SHO).

The CTD in Punjab has its own Counter Terrorism Force that aids the department to raid the terrorists. While the CTD KP relies on the Elite Force of the KP Police to raid the terrorist hideouts.

The manpower for all four CTD mostly comes from their relevant provincial police departments. The officers and constables were mostly absorbed into the CTD from the provincial police departments of the relevant police force. Thus, most of the officers or constables that serve in CTD are locals of those areas in which they operate. This helps CTD in its operations against the terrorists.

The CTF Staff which includes (CORPORALs, SERGEANTs, ADs) are directly appointed in the CTD Police Department. They work in different wings such as Intelligence Wing, Investigation Wing, IT Wing and Operational Wing.

In Intelligence wing Corporal work to collect traces of terrorist and Report To Do (DISTRICT OFFICER) which can be Corporal, SI, sergeant or Inspector and R.O Regional Officer (SSP/DD/AD) and get directions for further duties.

Grade	CTD Ranks	Abbreviations
BS-7	Constable	C
BS-9	Head Constable	HC
BS-11	Assistant Sub-Inspector	ASI
BS-14	Sub-Inspector Corporal	SI CPL(SI)
BS-16	Inspector Sergeant	Inspector SERGEANT(IP)
BS-17	Deputy Superintendent of Police Assistant Superintendent of Police Assistant Director	DSP ASP AD (DSP)
BS-18	Superintendent of Police Deputy Director	SP DD (SP)
BS-19	Senior Superintendent of Police Additional Director	SSP Addl Director (SSP)
BS-20	Deputy Inspector General Director	DIG Director (DIG)
BS-21	Additional Inspector General	Addl.IG

== CTD Sindh ==
In Sindh, the CTD bureau is led by an additional inspector-general of police, and has several other sub-bureaus established all over Karachi.

Other CTD sub-bureaus are located in Larkana, Sukkar, Hyderabad, and Mirpur, and are each led by a superintendent of police (SP). In Karachi, the CTD bureaus work on crime scene investigations, interrogations of suspects, antiterrorism, and intelligence in the city. In 2023, the Sindh government has increased the CTD budget by Rs2.83 billion rupees, which will be used to acquire equipment and weapons for CTD worth Rs72.28 million. Additionally, new vehicles worth Rs800 million will be purchased for the officers and staff in order to extend the CTD throughout Sindh.

In 2010, the TPP coordinated a terrorist attack at the CTD building in Karachi, nearly destroying the entire headquarters. Since 2010, Karachi CTD personnel have engaged in police encounters, shoot-outs, murder cases, and high speed chases involving the al-Qaeda and TTP terrorists. In 2015, CTD teams gunned down four al-Qaeda operatives after a high speed chase took place in Qayyumabad in Karachi. On January 8, 2025, The CTD Karachi In-charge Raja Umar Khattab, along with other CTD officials were dismissed from their positions following a short kidnapping in which CTD had been allegedly involved. The kidnapping resulted in an illegal transfer of over $340 million (PKR 94.588 billion) in cryptocurrency.

== CTD Punjab ==
CTD Punjab was established in 2010. After a restructuring in 2015, the CTD was assigned additional terrorism-related functions beyond its traditional intelligence duties. Operational counter terrorism forces were also allocated to the CTD with the creation of the Counter Terrorism Force, made up of specially trained police officers and potentially military personnel. CTD Punjab has three wings: 1. Intelligence wing 2. Operational wing 3. Investigational wing

== CTD Khyber-Pakhtunkhwa (KPK) ==
The CTD bureau in Khyber-Pakhtunkhwa often works with personnel of the Frontier Corps and Federal Investigation Agency as well as other offices of the Khyber-Pakhtunkhwa Police to execute its investigation, counterterrorism, and intelligence functions. The CTD bureau is headed by an additional inspector-general of police with headquarters in Peshawar. It is further divided into 14 Regional zones headed by the SSP or SP rank officers. The zones are located across the various divisions of KPK which include CTD Peshawar, CTD Bannu, CTD DI Khan, CTD Malakand, and CTD Kohat. It is again further sub-divided into various police stations and centers located in each district of the KPK.

The Peshawar CTD bureau has carried out raids on the hideouts of TPP militants. In 2013, the bureau was restructured and the Elite Force and Counter Terrorism Directorate (CTD), which work with the special agents of the FIA to carry out counter-terrorism operations, were added.

In the past, the CTD played a lead role in operations against criminals, smugglers and outlaws. In case of any extraordinary situation, the Frontier Constabulary would be called to assist the police in maintaining law and order. As of now, the Peshawar CTD now focuses on conducting criminal investigation and solving murder cases.

After the Fall of Kabul in August 2021, Pakistan has seen the revival of the tide of terrorism. CTD KP has been at forefront to bear the burnt of changes across the border in Afghanistan. CTD KP has undertaken dozens of Intelliegence Based Operations along with the other Law Enforcement Agencies (LEAs) in which scores of militants have been gunned down. The most prominent operation among them was search and strike operation in Swat district carried out by CTD KP to clear out various hilltops and ridge of mountains occupied by the militants. As of now, the CTD KP is highly active against the militant groups operating in the districts adjacent to the Afghanistan-Pakistan border.

In the wake of the Peshawar Police Lines attack, an appex committee meeting was convened in Peshawar under the chairmanship of the Prime Minister of Pakistan Shahbaz Sharif that was also attended by the Chief of Army Staff (COAS) Asim Munir in which upgradation plan for the CTD KPK was approved. It was decided that the CTD KP would be armed with modern equipment, a new Headquarters along with a forensic laboratory would be constructed in order to foster the investigation capabilities of the department.

== CTD Balochistan ==
The CTD bureau in Balochistan was established by the Balochistan Police in 2000. It was restructured as CTD Balochistan. Currently, the CTD bureau is headed by a deputy inspector general of police with its headquarters in Quetta. The CTD Balochistan has its own Counter Terrorism Force. It can also be assisted by the Balochistan Constabulary and the Balochistan Levies. The department has had many successes against the separatist and sectarian organizations. It has killed dozens of militants including prominent commanders of the banned entities. In one of such successful operation a terror training camp operated by the Islamic State (ISIS) was stormed by the CTD in Mastung, Balochistan in August 2021, resulting in the elimination of 11 ISIS terrorists.

== CTD Azad Kashmir ==
Given the rise in the threats of the terrorism, the Government of Pakistan has decided to expand CTD to Azad Kashmir in 2023.

== CTD Gilgit-Baltistan ==
In November 2024, the prime minister ordered the raising of a CTD bureau in Gilgit-Baltistan. In September 2025, Rs 720.50 million was disbursed by the federal government, due to the GB government's budgetary limits, to establish the Counter Terrorism Department of 613 posts, a headquarters in Gilgit and a regional office in Chilas.

== CTD Islamabad Capital Territory ==
In order to strengthen security apparatus of Islamabad Capital Territory in line with the National Action Plan and to prevent and control terrorist activities, Federal Government decided to raise Counter Terrorism Department (CTD) of Islamabad Police of its own for the prompt response to any eventuality.

CTD Islamabad is divided into various teams:

- Rapid Field Teams (RFT)
- Intelligence Field Team (IFT)
- Investigation Team (IT)
- Specialized Field Team (SFT)
- Explosives Handling Team
- High Rise & Mountaineering Team
- Snipers Team
- Amphibious Team
- Crisis Negotiation Team
- Composite Field Teams (CFT) (Combination of RFT & SFT)

== Vehicles ==
- Toyota Hilux (single-cabin)
- Toyota Corolla
- Toyota Hilux (double cabin)
- Land Rover Defender
- Toyota Corolla

== List of the operations carried out by the CTD ==
2023

- February

2 terrorists were gunned down by the CTD KP in Nowsher district.

26 IBOs were carried out by the CTD on various parts of Punjab in which mastermind of a car bomb blast in Rawalpindi was killed by the CTD Punjab whereas 11 other terrorists were arrested.

7 terrorists killed by the CTD in North Waziristan.

A suspected terrorist of a proscribed organization supported by the Research and Analysis Wing of India involved in two dozen blasts was arrested by the CTD Sindh in Jamshoro.

2 terrorists belonging to Pakistani Taliban were arrested by the CTD Punjab in Dera Ghazi Khan.

CTD Punjab killed one TTP commander in Mianwali.

CTD Balochistan arrested a woman suicide bomber in Quetta on 18 February 2023.

CTD Punjab arrested 8 TTP terrorists on 18 February 2023.

== See also ==
- List of law enforcement agencies in Pakistan
- Rangers Anti-Terrorism Wing
