= Dolphin Force =

Elite security unit of the Punjab Police

Dolphin Force ڈولفن فورس

Agency overview
- Formed: April 2016
- Preceding agency: Mahafiz Force
- Employees: 1800
- Legal personality: Punjab Police

Jurisdictional structure
- National agency: PK
- Operations jurisdiction: PK
- Area: 1,772 km^{2}
- Population: 11,126,285
- Governing body: Punjab Police
- General nature: Civilian police

Operational structure
- Headquarters: Walton Road, Lahore-54440
- Agency executive: Zohaib Nasrullah Ranjha, SP Dolphin Lahore
- Parent agency: Punjab Police

Dolphin Force is an elite unit of the Punjab Police that focuses on combating street crime. It was modelled on the Istanbul Police Dolphin Force and launched by the Chief Minister of Punjab, Shahbaz Sharif, in Lahore in 2016. Since then, it has been expanded to six other cities in the province, with a total of 696 policemen trained in its second phase.

In 2016, it was announced that a Dolphin Force would be introduced in other major cities in Punjab, such as Faisalabad, Rawalpindi, Multan, Gujranwala, Bahawalpur and Dera Ghazi Khan. The plan was approved in 2017 but has not yet been implemented. A Dolphin Force headquarters and a Superintendent of Police would be required in each city.

== Organization and structure ==
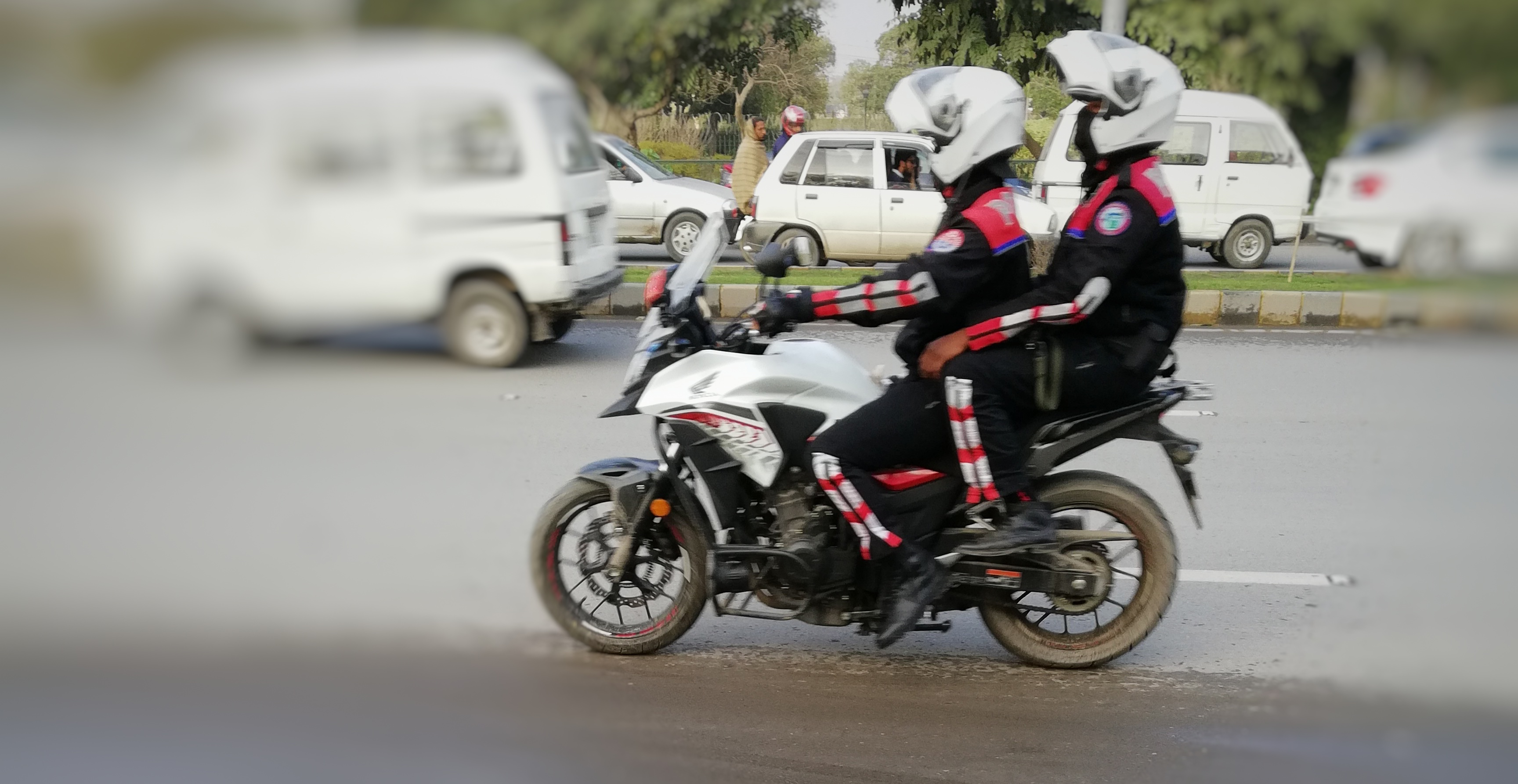
Two Dolphin Force officers patrolling the major road of Lahore

The Dolphin Force command centre is headed by the Superintendent of Police (SP) and is divided among several cities including Saggian Bridge, Iqbal Town, Harbanspura, Chung, Civil Lines and Model Town, each with 50 motorcycles.

The headquarters of the Dolphin Force is located on Walton Road in Lahore.

The force consists of 1,800 constables, 60 assistant sub-inspectors (ASIs), 15 sub-inspectors (SIs), 4 Deputy Superintendents of Police (DSPs), and a superintendent of police (SP), who work in three shifts with 300 motorcycles. The equipment used by the Dolphin Force includes 300 500cc Honda motorcycles, 10 minibuses for field support, 600 helmets, 600 camera-body cams, 200 GPS locators, and 300 wireless radios. Dolphin patrol officials are required to wear a special uniform.

Every motorcycle is operated by two police officers equipped with a wireless radio, firearm, handcuffs, GPS tracking device, camera and a special uniform in black with contrasting red and white colours.

A team of 25 police officers, led by an SP, travelled to Türkiye on 1 March 2015 for a two-month training program. Upon their return, they are to train 1,200 constables and other members of the force who have been selected for Dolphin Force.

== Criticism and controversies ==
Dolphin Force has been criticised for its mismanagement and lack of effectiveness. Despite spending one billion on the project, the force has been called a "white elephant" for the Punjab government. Instead of investing in fundamental police reforms and providing infrastructure and resources to existing organizations, a new force was created.

Several issues have been identified, such as each officer being given only one uniform to wear every day without the opportunity to change. The 50,000 rupee per piece parachute apparel was unsuitable for the warm climate in Lahore and had to be replaced with cotton uniforms, resulting in a significant waste of public funds.

Additionally, the heavy bikes purchased for one million rupees each had no spare parts and as maintenance staff had no experience with such vehicles, minor faults led to the bikes being taken out of service without replacements. Expensive helmets with Bluetooth technology were not fully utilised, as the Bluetooth was never integrated into the central communication network. Furthermore, constables with salaries as low as 22,000 rupees have been found taking bribes and providing safe passage to drug dealers.

=== Street crime rate in Lahore ===
Despite spending billions on the project and its high operational cost, the crime rate in Lahore rose in early 2016 and continued to increase throughout the year, with a 13.37% increase in July 2017.
