= Punjab Police (Pakistan) =

Provincial Law Enforcement Agency responsible for the province of Punjab in Pakistan

Punjab Police پنجاب پولیس

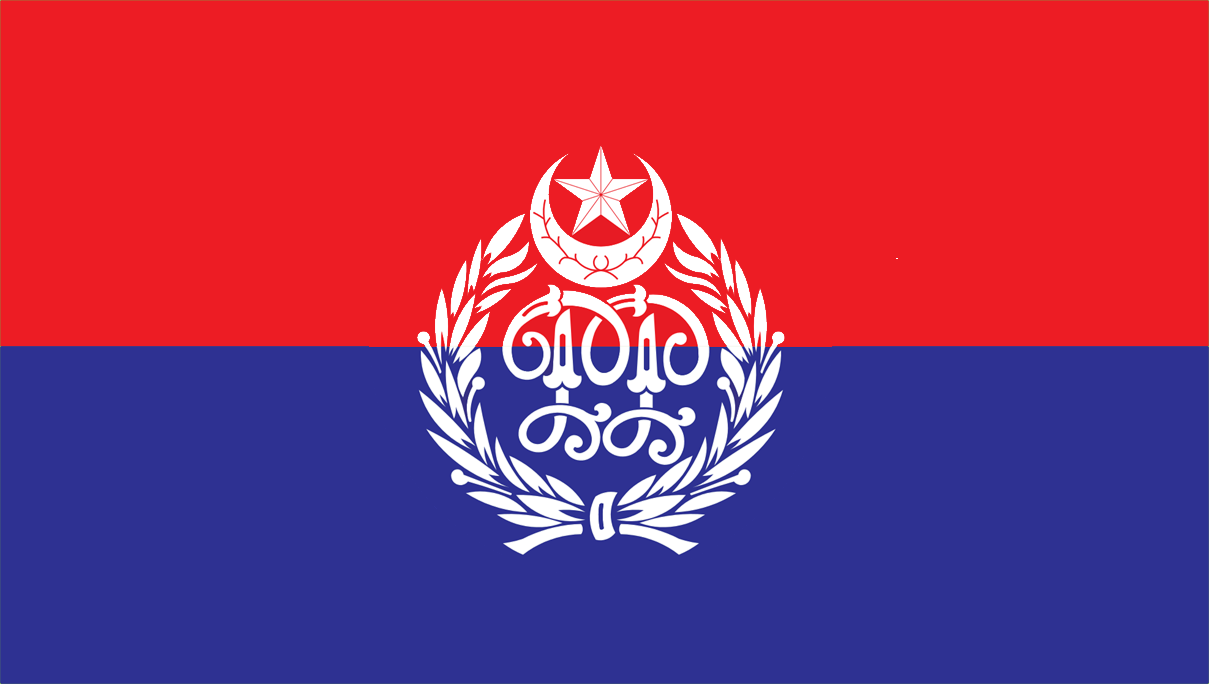
- Flag of Punjab Police
- Abbreviation: PP
- Motto: To Serve and Protect Our Punjab; Always Stand With People

Agency overview
- Formed: 1861; 165 years ago
- Employees: 700,000
- Annual budget: Classified

Jurisdictional structure
- Operations jurisdiction: Pakistan, Pakistan
- Map of Punjab Police's jurisdiction
- Area: 205,344 square kilometres (79,284 sq mi)
- Population: 128,000,000
- Legal jurisdiction: Punjab
- Governing body: Government of Punjab; Government of Pakistan
- Constituting instrument: Police Rules and Police Order 2002
- General nature: Civilian police

Operational structure
- Headquarters: Central Police Office, Lahore
- Agency executive: Rao Abdul Kareem
- Parent agency: Police Service of Pakistan

Website
- punjabpolice.gov.pk

The Punjab Police (Punjabi, Urdu: پنجاب پولیس) is a law enforcement agency of Punjab, Pakistan. Under the command of its Inspector General (IG), it administers all criminal cases under the Police Acts of 1861 and 2002. The force was introduced in its modern form under British rule, and a colonial influence continues. On 3 February 2026, Rao Abdul Kareem was appointed as the Inspector General of Punjab Police.

== History ==
=== Mughal Empire ===
Under the Mughal Empire, policing was organized on the basis of land tenure. Zamindars were responsible for apprehending disturbers of the public peace and performing other policing duties. At the village level, these functions were performed by the village headman. In large towns, functionaries known as kotwals combined law enforcement, municipal administration and revenue collection. Watchmen were on patrol and violent, organized crime was usually handled by the military.

=== British Raj ===
The modern system of policing was introduced during British rule. The British administration relieved the zamindars of responsibility for police service, and introduced magistrates with daroghas and other subordinate officers. The Punjab Police was organized in two branches: the Military Preventive Police and the Civil Detective Police. This arrangement proved unsatisfactory, however, and the government of British India urged the government of Punjab to investigate the province's system of policing in 1860. Due to the importance of the issue, the central government appointed a commission to investigate policing in British India. The Calcutta Police Commission of 1860 recommended abolition of the police's military arm, the appointment of an Inspector General of Police in the province and the supervision of police in a district by a District Superintendent. The commission recommended that only the district magistrate should conduct law-enforcement functions. Based on the commission's recommendations, the government of India submitted a bill which was enacted as Act V of 1861; the Police Act of 1861 was adopted. The organizational structure of the act still survives.

The Punjab Police Rules of 1933 documented the police practices of the time, and introduced measures for improving administration and operational effectiveness. The rules indicate that the Punjab Police was a professional police organization by 1934, had considerable knowledge of the province's crime and criminals, and developed effective procedures and practices for dealing with various kinds of criminal activity. The force's administrative and disciplinary functions were also described. They have been the model for similar rules in other provinces of Pakistan, and are still in force.

=== After independence ===
Arm Patch of Uniform

The Punjab Police played a significant role in handling the refugee crisis of 1947–48. It continued as a separate organization until 1955, when it was merged with the police of other provinces to create the West Pakistan Police. The West Pakistan Deputy Inspector General was Inayat Ali Shah. The East and West Pakistan DIGs reported to an IG who, during the 1950s, was Qurban Ali Khan. Several unsuccessful attempts were made to review and reform police organization and performance during the 1950s and 1960s. The Pakistan police's legal framework underwent a major change as a consequence of the Devolution of Power Plan, which was implemented between 2001 and 2006. The plan devolved much provincial-governmental authority and functions to the districts, and introduced public accountability of the police.

A system of district governments was introduced with the Punjab Local Government Ordinance 2001. As a part of the plan, the Police Order replaced the Police Act 1861 in 2002 and brought sweeping changes to the police. The new law introduced public accountability in the form of Public Safety Commissions at the district, provincial and national level. The Police Order 2002 also provided for an independent Police Complaints Authority, increased autonomy of the Inspector General of Police and separated investigation from other police functions. The Punjab Police are engaged in counterterrorism operations in the province.

== Organization ==
The Punjab Police is constituted by the Police Order 2002 and operates under the Police Rules of 1934. The Central Police Office (CPO) in Lahore which has a number of branches, including the Legal Affairs Division (Legal Branch), Finance and Welfare, Operations, Training, and Research and Development. The branches report to the Inspector General of Police through their Additional Inspectors General of Police. The Regional Police Officers report to the Inspector General of Police, and are not part of the Punjab CPO. The Inspector General of Police is the ex officio secretary of the Government of Punjab. The Punjab Police is staffed by its officers and those of the Police Service of Pakistan.

=== Units ===
- Anti-Riot Force (ARF)
- Counter Terrorism Department (CTD)
- Crime Control Department (CCD)
- Dolphin Force
- Punjab Border Military Police
- Punjab Constabulary
- Punjab Elite Force
- Punjab Highway Patrol
- Punjab River Police
- Punjab Safe Cities Authority (PSCA)
- Punjab Traffic Police
- Special Protection Unit (SPU)

=== Main formations ===
- Central Police Office, Anarkali, Lahore
- Investigation Branch
- Special Branch
- Telecommunication Branch
- Operations Branch

=== Police Regions ===
 Bahawalpur Region
    -DPO Bahawalpur
    -DPO Bahawalnagar
    -DPO Rahim Yar Khan
  D.G. Khan Region
    -DPO Dera Ghazi Khan
    -DPO Kot Addu
    -DPO Layyah
    -DPO Muzaffargarh
    -DPO Rajanpur
    -DPO Taunsa
  Faisalabad Region
    -CPO Faisalabad
    -DPO Chiniot
    -DPO Jhang
    -DPO Tob Tek Singh 
  Gujranwala Region
    -CPO Gujranwala
    -DPO Sialkot
    -DPO Narowal
  Gujrat Region
    -DPO Gujrat
    -DPO Mandi Bahauddin
    -DPO Hafizabad
  Multan Region
   -CPO Multan
   -DPO Vehari
   -DPO Khanewal
   -DPO Lodhran
  Rawalpindi Region
   -CPO Rawalpindi
   -DPO Attock
   -DPO Chakwal
   -DPO Jhelum
   -DPO Murree
   -DPO Talagang
  Sahiwal Region
   -DPO Sahiwal
   -DPO Pakpattan
   -DPO Okara
  Sargodha Region
   -DPO Sargodha
   -DPO Bhakkar
   -DPO Khushab
   -DPO Mianwali
  Sheikhupura Region
   -DPO Sheikhupura
   -DPO Nankana Sahib
   -DPO Kasur

=== Equipment ===
- Beretta 92FS
- Glock pistols
- Steyr GB
- Heckler & Koch MP5 - Pakistani MP5 (P2 & P3) and POF-5 variants (manufactured by license by Pakistan Ordnance Factories Limited)
- Type 56 assault rifle - Primary firearm
- Heckler & Koch G3 - Pakistani G3 (P3 & P4) variants (manufactured under license by Pakistan Ordnance Factories)
- Rheinmetall MG 3 - Mounted on vehicles (manufactured under license by Pakistan Ordnance Factories)
- Shotguns
- Riot guns

=== Vehicles ===
- Mohafiz (internal security vehicle)
- Toyota Hilux (single-cab and double-cabin)
- Toyota Corolla
- Suzuki Cultus
- Suzuki Mehran
- Nissan Patrol
- Suzuki Every
- Honda City
- Foton Tunland
- Suzuki Swift
- Toyota Land Cruiser
- Toyota Land Cruiser (70 Series)
- Toyota Fortuner
- Toyota Prius

Officers are allotted cars by rank. Bulletproof vehicles are provided to officers at sensitive posts.

== Ranks and Insignia ==
Rank group	General/flag officers			Senior officers			Junior officers		
Punjab Police	Insignia Of Inspector General of Punjab Police	Insignia Of Additional Inspector General of Punjab Police	Insignia Of Deputy Inspector General of Punjab Police	Insignia Of Senior Superintendent of Punjab Police	Insignia Of Superintendent of Punjab Police	Insignia Of Superintendent of Punjab Police	Insignia Of Deputy Superintendent of Punjab Police	Insignia Of Assistant Superintendent of Punjab Police	Insignia Of Assistant Superintendent of Punjab Police
Punjab Police	Inspector General of Police (IGP)	Additional Inspector General of Police (Addl-IG)	Deputy Inspector General of Police (DIG)	Additional Deputy Inspector General of Police / Senior Superintendent of Police (ADIG/SSP)	Superintendent of Police in Selection Grade (SP - SG)	Superintendent of Police (SP)	Deputy Superintendent of Police (DSP)	Assistant Superintendent of Police (Probationary Rank: 3 years of service)	Assistant Superintendent of Police (Probationary Rank: 1 year of service)

Rank group	Junior commissioned officers			Non commissioned officer		Enlisted
Punjab Police	Insignia Of Inspector of Punjab Police	Insignia Of Sub Inspector of Punjab Police	Insignia Of Assistant Sub Inspector of Punjab Police	Insignia Of Head Constable of Punjab Police	Insignia Of Naik of Punjab Police	No insignia
Punjab Police	Inspectorانسپکٹر	Sub Inspectorسب انسپکٹر	Assistant Sub Inspectorاسسٹنٹ سب انسپکٹر	Head Constable ہیڈ کانسٹیبل	Police Naik پولیس نائک	Constable سپاہی

== Controversies ==
The Anti-Corruption Establishment Punjab called Punjab Police the most corrupt public department in the province in a 2010 report. Members of the force have been involved in a number of criminal activities. In November 2017, a man was killed in a setup in Faisalabad. Initially identified as a robber, he was an unarmed civilian who had had an affair with a relative of the Gujranwala District deputy superintendent of police and left the country. During a visit to Pakistan, plainclothes police officer shot and killed him. Sexual assault, harassment, and mistreatment of women have also occurred. Express News reported on 20 November 2017 that two Punjab Police officers tore a woman's clothes, made a video, tried to blackmail her and shared the video on social media. Both officers were fired, but it is unknown if they faced criminal charges. Faisalabad police gang-raped the wife of a fellow police officer.

In November 2017, a video on social media depicted Punjab Police officers torturing an elderly couple; the entire police station was suspended. A seven-year-old child was arrested for kidnapping by Punjab Police in 2015. A 12-year-old was arrested by Punjab Police in Bahawalpur District after they failed to arrest his father, a farmer named in an FIR for disputing the price of sugar cane at a sugar mill. The boy brought his schoolbooks to jail.

In 2017, the Punjab Police changed its standard uniform constituting black shirts and khaki pants to Olive Green. The change had a mixed reaction; the government said that it had consulted professional designers, but the new uniform has been criticized as dull and less attractive. Media reports have circulated that the Punjab Police will revive their previous uniform again.

== Inspector Generals ==
Leadership
#	Name	From	To
1	Khan Qurban Ali Khan	August 1947	August 1952
2	Mian Anwar Ali	August 1952	October 1952
3	Khan Qurban Ali Khan	October 1952	February 1953
4	Mian Anwar Ali	February 1953	June 1953
5	S. N. Alam	June 1953	May 1955
6	Mian Anwar Ali	May 1955	May 1956
7	A. B. Awan	May 1956	May 1958
8	Muhammad Sharif Khan	May 1958	August 1962
9	S. N. Alam	August 1962	July 1963
10	S. D. Qureshi	July 1963	July 1968
11	Mian Bashir Ahmad	July 1968	April 1970
12	Muhammad Anwar Afridi	April 1970	October 1972
13	Sahibzada Raoof Ali	October 1972	August 1974
14	Rao Abdur Rasheed	August 1974	April 1976
15	Atta Hussain	April 1976	March 1977
16	Fazal-e-Haq	March 1977	July 1977
17	M. A. R. Arif	July 1977	September 1977
18	Khawaja Masrur Hussain	September 1977	February 1978
19	Habib Ur Rehman Khan	February 1978	July 1979
20	Muhammad Azam Qazi	July 1979	November 1980
21	Obaid-Ur-Rehman Khan	November 1980	June 1981
22	Laeeq Ahmad Khan	June 1981	September 1985
23	Hafiz S. D. Jamy	September 1985	18 August 1987
24	Nisar Ahmad Cheema	18 August 1987	6 March 1989
25	Manzoor Ahmad	8 March 1989	20 June 1991
26	Sardar Muhammad Chaudhry	21 June 1991	30 May 1993
27	G. Asghar Malik	1 June 1993	21 July 1993
28	Muhammad Abbas Khan	26 July 1993	8 August 1996
29	Zulfiqar Ali Qureshi	8 August 1996	26 November 1996
30	Muhammad Amin	27 November 1996	17 March 1997
31	Jehan Zaib Burki	18 March 1997	26 October 1999
32	Muhammad Rafique Haider	26 October 1999	12 June 2000
33	Malik Asif Hayat	12 June 2000	11 December 2002
34	Syed Masud Shah	12 December 2002	31 March 2004
35	Saadat Ullah Khan	1 April 2004	9 June 2005
36	Zia-ul-Hassan Khan	10 June 2005	29 December 2006
37	Ahmad Nasim	29 December 2006	27 February 2008
38	Azhar Hassan Nadeem	29 February 2008	16 April 2008
39	Shaukat Javed	17 April 2008	25 February 2009
40	Kh. Khalid Farooq	25 February 2009	1 April 2009
41	Shaukat Javed	1 April 2009	22 April 2009
42	Tariq Saleem	27 April 2009	31 December 2010
43	Javed Iqbal	7 January 2011	17 February 2012
44	Haji Mohammad Habib ur Rehman	17 February 2012	1 January 2013
45	Aftab Sultan	1 April 2013	25 May 2013
46	Khan Baig	25 May 2013	15 June 2014
47	Mushtaq Ahmad Sukhera	17 June 2014	10 April 2017
48	Muhammad Usman	10 April 2017	25 July 2017
49	Arif Nawaz Khan	25 July 2017	13 June 2018
50	Kaleem Imam	13 June 2018	11 September 2018
51	Muhammad Tahir	11 September 2018	15 October 2018
52	Amjad Javed Saleemi	15 October 2018	17 April 2019
53	Arif Nawaz Khan	17 April 2019	28 November 2019
54	Shoaib Dastgir	28 November 2019	9 September 2020
55	Inam Ghani	9 September 2020	8 September 2021
56	Rao Sardar Ali Khan	8 September 2021	23 July 2022
57	Faisal Shahkar	23 July 2022	21 December 2022
58	Aamir Zulfiqar Khan	22 December 2022	23 January 2023
59	Usman Anwar	23 January 2023	2 February 2026
60	Rao Abdul Kareem	3 February 2026	Present

== See also ==
- Punjab Police College Sihala
- Crime Control Department
- Law enforcement in Pakistan
- Dolphin Force
- Punjab Highway Patrol
- Punjab Prisons (Pakistan)
- Balochistan Police
- Azad Kashmir Police
- Gilgit-Baltistan Police
- Khyber Pakhtunkhwa Police
- Sindh Police
- Muhammad Safdar Awan
