= Tora Wari =

Torawari طوراوڑی
- Federally Administered Tribal Areas
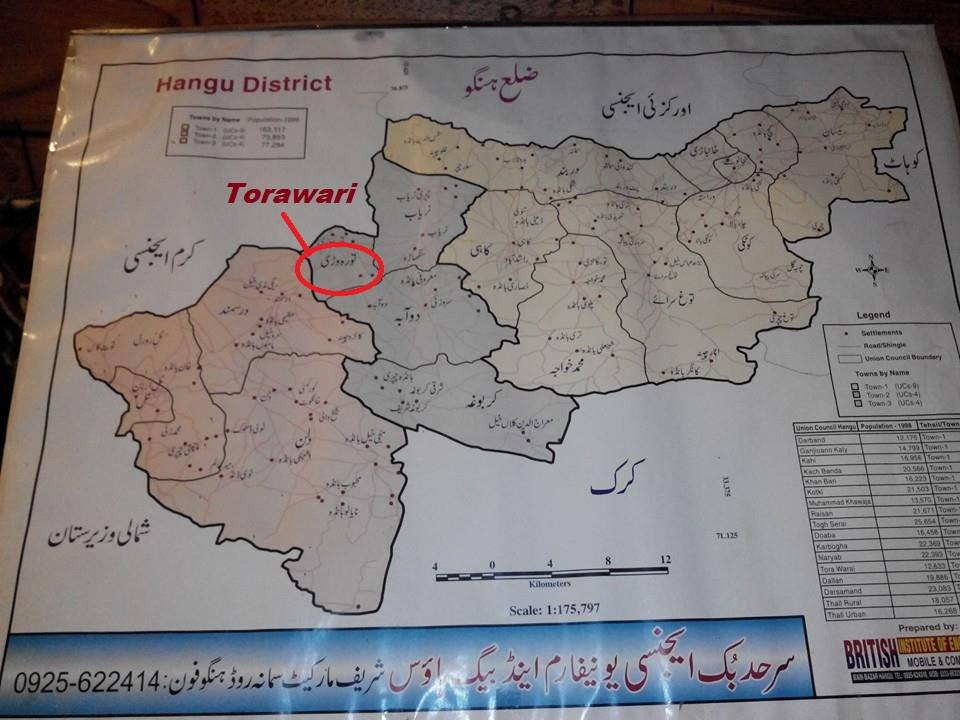
- Location of Torawari in Tehsil Thal . Hangu District
- Interactive map of Torawari
- Coordinates: 33°22′47″N 70°43′27.47″E
- Country: Pakistan
- Region: Khyber Pakhtunkhwa
- District: Hangu District
- Tehsil: Doaba
- Province: Federally Administered Tribal Areas
- Continent: Asia
- Elevation: 969 m (3,179 ft)
- Time zone: UTC+5 (PST)

Torawari(طوراوڑی) is a village with a small population. Torawari was a part of Federally Administered Tribal Areas until 2019, when a bill was passed under the government of Prime Minister Imran Khan. It has since become Torawari which is located in the Tehsil Thal Hangu District in Khyber Pakhtunkhwa, Pakistan.

Torawari is bordered by Kuram to the north, Naryab to the east, Darsamand to the west, and Doaba to the south.

== Tribes ==
The main tribe living in Torawari is Khuidad khel. Khado khel, Hassan khel, Bharat Khel, Bharam khel and Tappy are the sub tribes of khuidadkhail tribe.

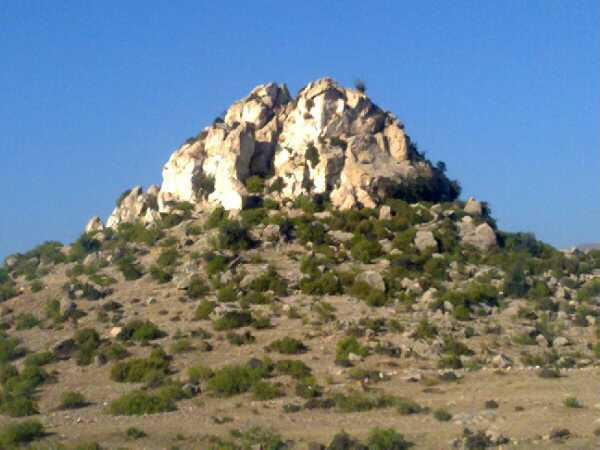
Lak Konrah of Torawari

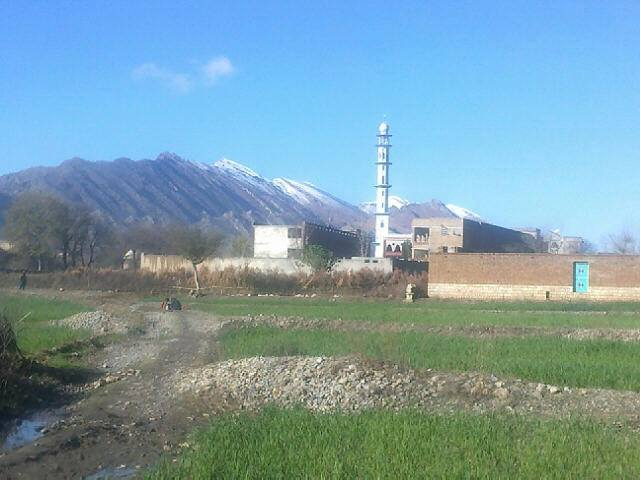
Sight of Torawari
