= Nishan-e-Shujaat =

Civilian honour awarded by the government of Pakistan

Nishan-e-Shujaat نشانِ شجاعت
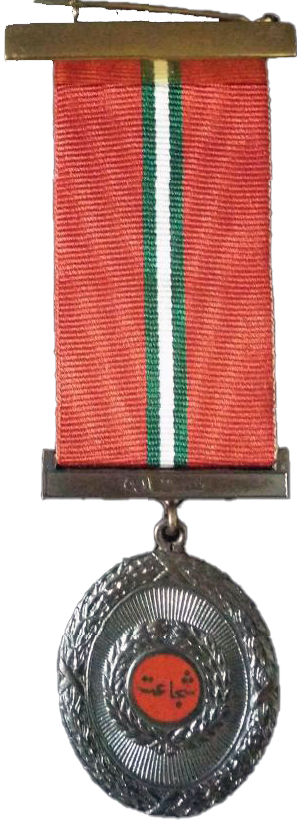
- Medal for Nishan-e-Shujaat

Awarded by Government of Pakistan
- Type: Award
- Established: 19 March 1957
- Country: Islamic Republic of Pakistan
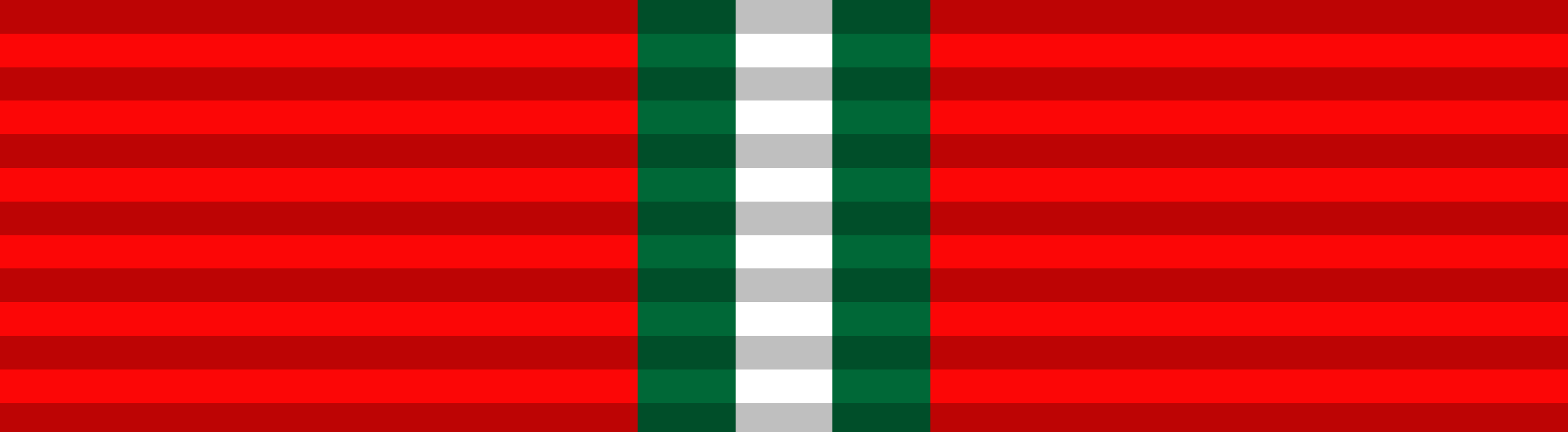
- Ribbon: Nishan-e-Shujaat Ribbon
- Eligibility: Pakistanis
- Awarded for: Civil Gallantry
- Status: Currently constituted

Statistics
- First induction: 19 March 1957

Precedence
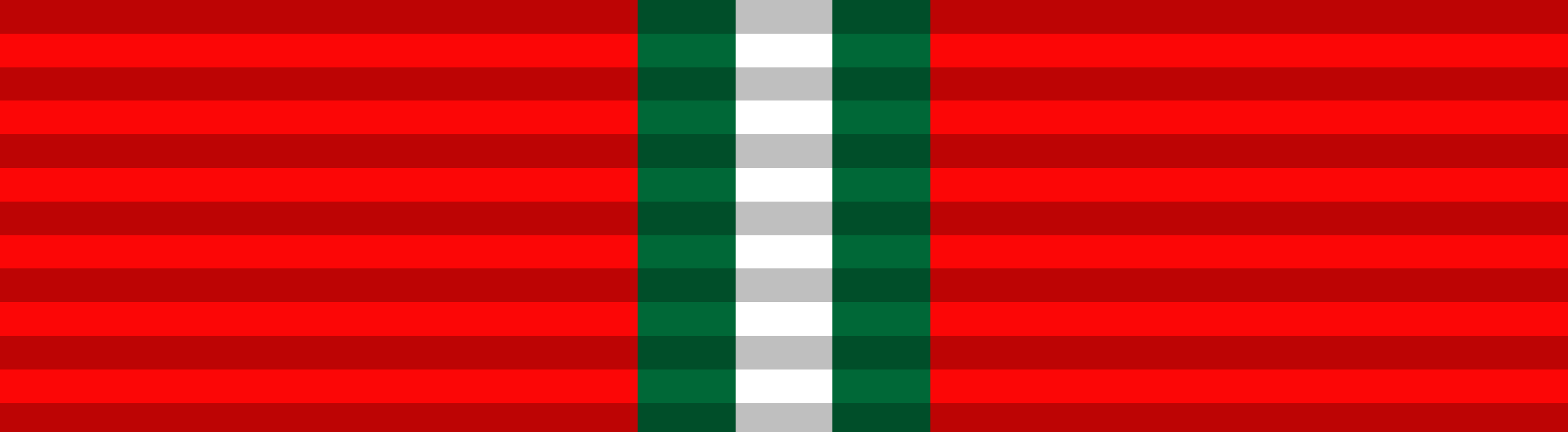
- Next (lower): Hilal-e-Shujaat

Nishan-e-Shujaat (Urdu: نشانِ شجاعت, lit. 'Order of Valour'; also spelled Nishan-i-Shujaat) is a civilian honour awarded by the Government of Pakistan for military and civilian acts of conspicuous gallantry, which are not always in the face of the enemy. The Nishan-i-Shujaat is worn as a breast badge suspended from a red ribbon threaded through a gold star and crescent.

== Order of precedence ==
- Nishan-e-Shujaat – Symbol of Valour
- Hilal-e-Shujaat – Crescent of Valour
- Sitara-e-Shujaat – Star of Valour
- Tamgha-e-Shujaat – Medal of Valour

== List of recipients ==
Recipient	Year
Shaheed Malik Saad	2007
Shaheed Safwat Ghayur	2010
Aitzaz Hasan (Sitara-e-Shujaat)	2014
Naeem Rashid	2019

== See also ==
- Civil decorations of Pakistan
