= Khan of Hangu =

The Khan of Hangu, also known as Raees e Hangu, was the title of the tribal chiefs of Hangu valley (Miranzai Valley). The first to take the title was(Ali mardankhan also known as mardu khan in the 16th century. After him, his clan, the Mardukhel (literally the Clan of Mardu), ruled the valley for more than 400 years. They belong to the Miranzai sub-tribe of the larger Bangash tribe.

== History ==
The history of the family before Mardu Khan is not well documented. However, several sources claim that Bangash migrants settled in the valley in the 1500s, came into conflict with the local tribes and a series of battles were fought. One of the opposing tribes was the Orakzai. An incident is noted that while the tribes were engaged in a fierce battle, a youth arrived at the scene and declared "Dai" (meaning "It is") three times and went on to say "Sam the Bangasho, Ghra the Orakzo" which translates from Pushto as "It is, it is, it is, The valley plains for the Bangash and the hills for the Orakzai".

An alliance is also documented between the Bangash and the Khattak tribes collaborating to expel the rival tribes from the valley. However, this unity was fleeting, as the Khattaks themselves faced expulsion at a later juncture. Today, although the Orakzai still inhabit some parts of Hangu district and are even allied to the Bangash, the Khattaks are not present and are instead settled in the neighbouring Karak district.

== Battle with Darveza ==
After Mardu Khan was declared the Khan, Hangu was attacked by a detachment of troops led by Darveza Niazi. Being heavily outnumbered, Mardu Khan retreated to the Miranzai stronghold of Kasha, a strategic location in Hangu's Samana mountain range. The Mishti and Rabiakhel Orakzais at Kasha were close allies of the Khan.

During his brief stay at Kasha, Mardu Khan had gathered a huge number of troops. Along with his Miranzai kinsmen, his newly reinforced army could have possibly included tribals of the surrounding areas. A counterattack was launched and resulted in a decisive victory for Mardu Khan. Darveza himself was one of the casualties and lost his life, while Mardu Khan returned victorious and established rule once again. This rule would go on for centuries.

After Mardu Khan, the title passed on to his son, Khan Muhammad Khan, and a dynasty came into being.

== Title ==
Although the name 'Khan' is synonymous with Pashtun people, but only the tribal chief was given the title of Khan, meaning 'King' in Turkic languages. His family members were individually referred to as Khan as well whereas the whole family would be named 'Khankhel' (Clan of the khan). Nowadays nearly all Pashtuns, and some other groups of people use the term indifferently.

== Role in political affairs ==
The Khan had the roles of King, Commander in Chief of the Army, and Jirga Leader, all in one. Absolute authority was exercised by the Chiefs. Their control gradually extended up until a point in time. During the reign of Ghulam Muhammad Khan, the eighth Khan of Hangu, his control extended from the borders of Waziristan in the south to Mattani in the Peshawar district in the northeast.

== British Raj ==
After the British came to the North-west Frontier for occupation, they faced strong resistance from the local Pashtun population. A number of expeditions were sent to every area that did not pay revenue or dismissed British rule. Hangu valley was no exception. However, when Hangu's borders were continually attacked by Wazir tribes in adjacent Waziristan, especially the city of Thall, Hangu had to cease fire after the first Miranzai expedition. However, with the Waziristan tribes still continuing their raids on British garrisons and Hangu villages, the Khan sought revenge for betrayal and an alliance with the British was made to put an end to the rebels once and for all. The second Miranzai expedition was led by General Chamberlain, Muhammad Amin Khan, who was a cousin of the Khan of the time 'Ghulam Haider Khan' and Captain Coke. Amin Khan knew how to deal with the Wazirs and therefore was present in the British contingent. The expedition was a success and succeeded in crushing the raiders, forcing them to submit and pay revenue. Some Turi tribe elements, also involved in the raids, were also dealt with. Turis were allied to the Bangash of Thall but later turned their backs against them.

Ghulam Haider Khan died when his eldest son, Khan Bahadur Allahyar Khan, was still very young. This led to the decision of making Ghulam Haider Khan's brother, Muzaffar Khan, the chief. The title of Khan was confirmed to Muzaffar Khan despite Captain Coke's insistence on making another man, loyal to him, the chief. On this Captain Coke resigned.

== Political and international affairs ==
The Khans of Hangu were on friendly terms with the Mughal and later Durrani empires. They were fierce rivals of the Brakazais, who succeeded the Durranis.

A number of letters, usually of national importance, were exchanged between the Mughal rulers and Hangu chiefs. Letters from emperors Shah Jahan, Jahangir and Aurangzeb are still in possession of the family.

The Khans and their Armies had differing relations with the British government. At first they were completely against them and fought valiantly to oppose occupation. But after the Waziristan and Turi fronts continued to disrupt any progress, they decided to join hands with the British and deal with them by force.

Just as seen in international politics today, all alliances, treaties and agreements etc. are signed based on national interests. Hangu, assessing the situation, and seeking vengeance, sided with the party that contributed in protecting their interests.
