= Zargari, Khyber Pakhtunkhwa =

Zargari
- Village
- Location in Pakistan
- Coordinates: 33.518°N 70.782°E
- Country: Pakistan
- Region: Khyber Pakhtunkhwa
- District: Hangu
- Tehsil: Thall
- Elevation: 970 m (3,180 ft)
- Time zone: [[UTCPST]]
  - Summer (DST): +5

Zargari is a village in Hangu District, Pakistan.

In 2008, Pakistani military operations in the Pakistani tribal regions referred to Zargari as a conservative area and Taliban's stronghold.

== Geography and climate ==
Zargari is located in the northwestern frontier of Pakistan in a mountainous region on the Iranian Plateau right on the junction between the Hindu Kush mountains and the Eurasian Plate, which leads to seismic activities. Peshawar, the capital of the Khyber Pakhtunkhwa province, is about 100 kilometres (62 mi) northeast of Zargari. Its tehsil, Thall, is about 45 kilometres (28 mi) at northeast, while Hangu, the capital of the district, is about 14 kilometres (8.7 mi) at northwest of the village. The nearest village is Naryab, which is about 5 kilometres (3.1 mi) south-southwest of Zargari. Halfway between Zargari and Naryab is the Naryab Dam (33.4873°N 70.8030°E), which is easily accessible via the Dam Road.

Zargari has a semi-arid climate, with very hot summers and mild winters. Winter starts in mid-November and ends in late-March, while summer's months are from late-May to September. The average temperatures are hot in summer when the maximum temperature can surpass 40 °C (104 °F) and the minimum temperature is about 25 °C (77 °F). During the winter, the minimum temperature is around 4 °C (39 °F), while the maximum temperature can reach 18 °C (64 °F). Zargari is not in a monsoon region, however, moderate rainfalls occur in both seasons. During the winter rainfall shows a higher record between the months of February and April. The average annual precipitation level is about 400 millimetres (16 in) and the highest annual rainfall level is about 900 millimetres (35 in). Wind speeds vary during the year, ranging from 5 knots (9.3 km/h; 5.8 mph) in December to 24 knots (44 km/h; 28 mph) in June. The relative humidity varies from 46% in June to 76% in August.
