= Intelligence Bureau (Pakistan) =

Civil Intelligence Agency of Pakistan

Agency overview
- Formed: 1830
- Preceding agency: Central Intelligence Bureau
- Jurisdiction: Pakistan
- Headquarters: Islamabad, Pakistan
- Motto: Security, Integrity, Sovereignty
- Agency executive: Fuad Asadullah Khan H.I., S.St., T.St., Director General

The Intelligence Bureau (Urdu: انٹیلی جنس بیورو) is Pakistan’s premier civilian security agency, operating under the administrative control of the Prime Minister’s Office. It is primarily responsible for collecting, analysing, and disseminating intelligence related to internal security, counter-terrorism, counter-espionage, and economic threats. Established in 1947 following Pakistan’s formation as a new State, IB traces its institutional origins to the colonial era Thuggee and Dacoity Department founded in 1830 under British rule. Over the decades, IB has evolved into a key component of Pakistan’s national security architecture, tasked with safeguarding sensitive government institutions, monitoring subversive and extremist activities, and supporting law enforcement agencies in maintaining internal stability. In 2024, the organization was elevated to the status of a Division, marking a significant milestone in its development.

== History ==
The Intelligence Bureau (IB) traces its origins to 1830, when the Thuggee and Dacoity Department was established by the British colonial administration under Captain William Henry Sleeman, appointed as General Superintendent by Governor-General Lord William Bentinck. Its primary mandate was to suppress organized gangs of thugs and dacoits who targeted caravans and traders across the Indian subcontinent.

In 1863, following the reorganization of police forces, the department was retained under the Foreign Department to operate in the Native States. Its role was expanded to include the collection of intelligence on organized crimes that transcended provincial and state boundaries. By 1887, the department’s mandate was formally broadened to collect, compare, and analyze intelligence on organized criminal networks, providing inputs to both local and imperial governments to aid in the maintenance of law and order.

In 1904, it was restructured and renamed the Central Criminal Intelligence Department, with H. A. Stuart appointed as its first Director and D. E. McCracken as Deputy Director. The Central Criminal Intelligence Department's functions were widened to include intelligence gathering on inter-provincial organized crime, currency forgery, arms trafficking, and the maintenance of a central fingerprint bureau for criminal records.

In 1912, the organization was redesignated as the Central Intelligence Bureau, with an expanded charter encompassing political intelligence, particularly regarding political movements, Afghanistan, and investigations into political crimes.

By 1935, the Central Intelligence Bureau's responsibilities extended further to include the protection of sensitive government records, inquiries into security-related matters, and the provision of regular intelligence briefings to provincial governors on the political and administrative situation in their territories.

Following the independence of Pakistan in 1947, the Central Intelligence Bureau was reorganized as the Intelligence Bureau, with its headquarters initially established in Karachi under its first director, G. Ahmed. The headquarters were later moved to Rawalpindi in 1962.

A significant reorganization took place in 1994, when the bureau was restructured on the pattern of the national police system, expanding its presence across the country. The nomenclature of officers and officials was standardized, and this structure continues to remain in place.

In 2015, the bureau underwent a major modernization and expansion phase, introducing advanced technical infrastructure, surveillance systems, and the establishment of specialized counter-terrorism investigation teams trained to address threats to national security in a systematic manner.

In 2024, the bureau was formally elevated to the status of a division, marking a milestone in its institutional development and operational independence.

== Structure ==
The Intelligence Bureau Division operates directly under the Prime Minister, who serves as its Minister-in-Charge. It has a centralized command structure headed by the Director General (DG), who is a grade-22 officer and ex-officio Federal Secretary. The DG is supported by senior officers and specialized operational and administrative wings.

=== Wings ===
The Bureau is organized into a number of specialized Wings, and field units; each responsible for specific intelligence domain and area of responsibility. Some of the major wings of the organization deal with subjects like domestic counter intelligence; countering terrorism through collecting and analyzing intelligence on terrorist/extremist networks, and militant activities; internal security; economic intelligence focusing on financial crimes, economic threats, hoarding, smuggling, and financial intelligence gathering; foreign liaison; technical operations; research and analysis.

=== Designations ===
The Intelligence Bureau has a hierarchical personnel structure with ranks corresponding to Basic Pay Scales (BPS). The DG (BPS-22) serves as the head of the organization, supported by multiple tiers of command and operational officers. Recruited officers undergo structured training at the Intelligence Bureau Academy, preparing them for both operational and analytical roles within the organization.

== Director Generals ==
Since Pakistan’s independence in 1947, Intelligence Bureau Pakistan has been led by a succession of heads drawn from military as well as civilian backgrounds. Traditionally, the head of the agency held the title Director, but starting in December 1994 the title was changed to director general, a BS-22 officer who reports directly to the Prime Minister of Pakistan. Following the 2024 elevation of the Intelligence Bureau to the status of a division of the federal government, the director general also serves as the ex-officio Secretary to the Intelligence Bureau Division.

Sr. No.	Portrait	Director IB	From	To
1		G. Ahmed, PSP	1947	1949
2		S. Kazim Raza, PSP	1949	1953
3		M. H. Khan Bangali, PSP	1953	1957
4		M. Anwar Ali, PSP	1957	1960
5		A. B. Awan, PSP	1960	1967
6		N. A. Rizwi, PSP	1967	1971
7		M. Anwar Ali, PSP	1972	1973
8		M. Akram Sheikh, PSP	1973	1977
9		M. Saghir Anwar, PSP	1977	1979
10		Khwaja Masrur Husain, PSP	1979	1985
11		Maj. Gen. Agha Nek Muhammad	1985	1986
12		M. Aslam Hayat, PSP	1986	1988
13		Sardar Noor Elahi Leghari, PSP	1989	1990
14		Brig. (Retd) Imtiaz Ahmed	1990	1993
15		Sardar Noor Elahi Leghari, PSP	1993	1994
16		Major (Retd) Masood Sharif Khan	1994	1996
17		Major General (Retd) Talat Munir	2001	2003
18		Brig. (Retd) Ijaz Ahmad Shah, HI, SI(M), T.Bt	2004	2008
19		Dr. Muhammad Shoaib Suddle, PSP	2008	2009
20		Javed Noor, PSP	2009	2011
21		Aftab Sultan, PSP	2011	2018
22		Shujaat Ullah Qureshi, IB	2018	2018
23		Dr. Muhammad Sulaman Khan, PSP	2018	2022
24		Fuad Asadullah Khan, H.I., S.St., T.St., nsc	2022	Present

Throughout IB’s history, a number of its personnel have lost their lives in the line of duty. Their sacrifices reflect the Bureau’s continuous involvement in sensitive security operations and its role in supporting the state’s internal security framework.

Sr. No.	Name & Designation	Date of Martyrdom
1	Abdul Rashid, Sub Inspector	1981
2	Abdul Latif Baloch, Sub Inspector	1993
3	Habib Khan, Head Constable	1995
4	Muhammad Sarwar, Inspector	1996
5	Baitullah Khan, Assistant Director	2004
6	Khubaz Khan, Inspector	2004
7	Khan Sardar, Sub Inspector	2005
8	Nazar Muhammad, Stenographer	2007
9	M. Javed Hassan, Sub Inspector	2007
10	Liaquat Ali, Sub Inspector	2007
11	Nisar Ali, Director	2008
12	Fazal-ur-Rehman, Sub Inspector	2008
13	M. Ibrahim, Sub Inspector	2008
14	Khaliq-uz-Zaman, Inspector	2008
15	Javed Iqbal, Sub Inspector	2009
16	M. Dil Nawaz Khan, Inspector	2009
17	M. Tanveer Raza, Inspector	2009
18	Muhammad Irfan	2010
19	Abdullah Jan Tareen, Inspector	2010
20	Abdul Razzaq, Inspector	2011
21	Arshad Ali Ghayas, Assistant Sub Inspector	2011
22	Sirajuddin, Assistant Director	2011
23	Bashir Khan, Inspector	2012
24	Syed Qamar Raza Naqvi, Inspector	2012
25	Maqbool Hussain, Sub Inspector	2012
26	Abdul Hanan, Assistant Sub Inspector	2012
27	Ashok Kumar	2013
28	Syed Mahmood-ul-Hassan, Inspector	2013
29	Mazhar Ali, Inspector	2013
30	Qamar Anees, Assistant Sub Inspector	2014
31	Usman Gul, Inspector	2016
32	Riaz Ahmed, Constable	2017
33	Syed Hubdar Hussain Shah, Naib Constable	2017
34	Khan Bahadur, Sub Inspector	2021
35	Muzahir Hussain Bangash, Stenotypist	2022
36	Amjad Khan, Assistant Sub Inspector	2022
37	Najeeb-ur-Rehman, Assistant Sub Inspector	2022
38	Kifayat Ullah, Assistant Sub Inspector	2022
39	Shaukat Mehboob, Inspector	2022
40	Sultan Ayaz Khan, Sub Inspector	2024
41	Shahid Anwar, Inspector	2025

== Employment and training ==
Officers in Basic Scales (BS) 16 and 17 are recruited through the Federal Public Service Commission. The selection process typically involves a multi-stage examination, beginning with a multiple-choice screening test, followed by an English descriptive examination, a psychological assessment, and a final interview.

Personnel in BS-14 and below are generally inducted through internal recruitment processes. Upon selection, all new recruits undergo structured training programmes conducted at the Intelligence Bureau Academy. The training curriculum is designed to build operational, analytical, and field intelligence skills required for service in the organization and involves rigorous physical training.

== Operations ==
Details of some of the operations undertaken by IB are given below:

=== 1989 ===
- In 1989, IB exposed a plot aimed at toppling Prime Minister Benazir Bhutto’s government through a vote of no confidence. Acting on intelligence that two serving ISI officers, Brigadier Imtiaz Ahmed and Major Mohammad Aamer, were attempting to bribe Pakistan Peoples Party parliamentarians.

=== 2010 ===
- In April 2010, IB allegedly recruited Madhuri Gupta, a Second Secretary in the press and information wing of the Indian High Commission in Islamabad, who was later arrested in New Delhi on espionage charges.

=== 2013 ===
- In 2013, IB apprehended three members of Lashkar-e-Jhangvi in Karachi who were directly involved in the bombing attack on Justice Maqbool Baqir of the Sindh High Court. The operation dismantled a key sectarian terrorism cell operating in the city and was regarded as a major counter-terrorism success in Karachi’s security crackdown.

=== 2019 ===
- In 2019 after Indian airstrikes in Pakistan's Balakot, IB managed to bust whole ring of local informers that mapped and provided crucial operations to Indian RAW which helped IAF in locating its targets.

=== 2021 ===
- In July 2021, IB disrupted an information and intelligence network of Indian intelligence agency RAW operating in Pakistan. A militant, Salimullah, was apprehended while filming strategic military installations in Azad Jammu and Kashmir. Subsequent investigation led to the exposure of an espionage network allegedly directed by an RAWoperative based in Germany. According to official sources, the network had recruited individuals across Pakistan through fake social media profiles and tasked them with collecting information on sensitive military sites.
- In 2021, as killings of Kashmiri leaders in different cities was a mystery for the law enforcement agencies, the IB unearthed the network who killed Khalid Raza of Al-Badar Mujahideen and Zahid Ibrahim of Hizb-ul-Mujahideen. It discovered a network led by an ex-Rangers commando, Muhammad Ali. All of its members were apprehended. Muhammad Ali admitted working for Indian Intelligence Agency RAW since 2017 other than revealing that he had conducted surveillance of Hafiz Saeed and of Hamza, the son of Fazlur Rehman Khalil on the direction of Indian RAW. A retired-Rangers commando, Muhammad Ali who was working as a hitman for RAW by running an assassination cell within Pakistan that aimed to eliminate prominent Kashmiri militants was nabbed along with his accomplices in 2023. His entire cell was dismantled by IB. Later, it was revealed that Muhammad Ali was tasked by Indian agencies to eliminate Hafiz Saeed and other Kashmiri militant leaders residing inside Pakistan after RAW's failed assassination bid to eliminate Hafiz in 2021.

=== 2022 ===
- RAW's nefarious plan to infiltrate spies into prominent military installations of Pakistan was countered by IB in 2022. The IB unmasked 25 Indian agents and successfully thwarted India's attempt to infiltrate Pakistan security apparatus.
- In early 2022, intelligence gathered by IB led to the prevention of an attempted attack on the President of Pakistan Arif Alvi during the annual Sibi Mela. Security measures were enhanced in advance of the visit, forcing the attackers to detonate their explosives after the President had departed, resulting in the deaths of security personnel but averting a larger tragedy.It turned out the bomber was Daesh leader, Ziaur Rehman, in Kachhi and Sibi districts where the ISPP had moved after losing ground in the suburbs of Quetta.
- In 2022, IB led an operation against Bilal Sabit Gang, a criminal network involved in hundreds of armed robberies, vehicle thefts, and targeted killings in major Pakistani cities. The group had reportedly maintained ties with ISKP, which claimed responsibility for several of the killings. Following the assassination of an Intelligence Bureau officer in Peshawar in May 2022, the Bureau intensified its pursuit of the group. High-value targets, including senior members and the gang’s ring leader Bilal Sabit, were neutralized during operations in Rawalpindi.
- In December 2022, a short video clip went viral focusing in on the Parliament House building which was apparently posted by Indian funded anti-Pakistan Islamist group Tehreek-i-Taliban Pakistan. The IB determined after a careful examination that the clip was filmed at Trail-3 of Margalla Hills and identified one Daniyal Ahmad who had filmed and uploaded it. He was traced in Swabi, arrested and handed over to the Counter Terrorism Department (CTD), Islamabad.

=== 2025 ===
- In March 2025, the Intelligence Bureau, in coordination with the Federal Investigation Agency (Pakistan), conducted a major operation against a transnational human-trafficking syndicate, resulting in the arrest of ringleader Usman Ali Jajja from Sialkot. Jajja and his network were accused of extorting Rs 39.3 million from 19 Pakistani migrants under false promises of employment in Italy, later abandoning them in Libya. The crackdown followed a December 2024 migrant boat tragedy in the Mediterranean and led to multiple criminal cases under anti-smuggling and emigration laws, marking a significant action against organized human trafficking in the country.
- In June 2025, Pakistani agencies, CTD, Punjab and IB, achieved a major breakthrough against Indian sponsored terrorism by nabbing 6 individuals working for Indian agency RAW from across Punjab. Six Pakistani nationals working as Indian spies were arrested by Pakistani authorities as part of Operation Yalghar. Punjab CTD Chief Shehzada Sultan confirmed the arested while stating alleged spies were arrested from Bahawalpur and Bahawalnagar.Indian spies were planning attacks on mosques and railway stations. Pakistani agencies further confirmed involvement of Indian officials belonging to India's RAW Major Ravindra Rathore and Inspector Singh who supplied IEDs bombs, devices and detonations to the Indian spies with help of India's Border Security Force deployed on India-Pakistan border to carry out terrorist activities across Pakistan. Audio recordings of Indian spies receiving instructions from the Indian RAW officials recovered from the electronic devices of Indian spies working in Pakistan proving India's persistent efforts to foster terrorism in Pakistan.
- In June 2025, four fishermen working for Indian agency RAW were arrested from Karachi, for sending images and videos of sensitive installations to India's agencies RAW. As per Pakistani authorities, all Indian spies crossed into India via India-Pakistan border and Arabian sea multiple times to meet their Indian handler who was an official of India's RAW Colonel Ranjit. Colonel Ranjit paid each Indian spy 100,000-150,000 Rupees (up to $525) per visit to collect sensitive data of routes leading to key military sites in Karachi.RAW's spy ring was successfully busted by the CTD, Sindh in close coordination with IB.
- In August 2025, The Counter-Terrorism Department (CTD), Sindh in coordination with the Intelligence Bureau on Saturday claimed that it has unearthed a network of India’s intelligence agency, the Research and Analysis Wing (RAW), which used Pakistanis and a separatist outfit in Sindh to carry out the targeted killing of a well-known social worker in Matli, Badin district.CTD chief Additional Inspector General (AIG) Azad Khan told a press conference that the killing was an outcome of ‘transnational terrorism’ involving a Gulf-based handler of RAW. He said Abdul Rehman, a man actively engaged in social welfare activities in Matli, was targeted by three suspects on May 8, 2025. He added that the Indian media was ‘rejoiced’ over the killing by portraying the victim as “an enemy of Bharat”. He opined that this targeted killing was carried out in the background of the May 9-10 war between India and Pakistan in which New Delhi had been “defeated”. The AIG said law enforcement agencies were expecting hostile activities from India following that conflict. With the help of technology, four suspects were arrested on July 8, and their links with RAW were established. CTD claimed that a Gulf-based RAW agent, Sanay Sanjeev Kumar alias Fauji, was involved in planning the killing. He had recruited Salman, a Gulf-based resident of Sheikhupura. Salman reportedly arrived in Karachi on May 12, proceeded to Hyderabad, while four other suspects travelled from Muridke and Sheikhupura. Three of them carried out the killing in Matli, while Salman and another suspect stayed at a Hyderabad hotel to coordinate the attack. They remained in contact with RAW operative Sanjay during the operation. Later, Salman left Karachi for the Gulf and eventually escaped to Nepal. Mr Khan further claimed RAW had provided “huge sums of money” to the network through banks and other channels. He added that the banned separatist group, the Sindhudesh Revolutionary Army (SRA), had facilitated RAW in executing the targeted killing. Terming the incident as “state-sponsored terrorism,” the CTD chief said India’s hostile agency RAW had also been found involved in other terrorist attacks and targeted killings in Pakistan, often using criminal groups and proxies. During the press conference, the CTD also showed slides to the media containing documentary evidence of links between the RAW agent Sanjay and the killers. To a question, the AIG said since it was ‘transnational terrorism’ case, the Pakistan government was likely to take it up at international forums. He added this was also a case of ‘terror financing’ that would be highlighted at every forum. He revealed that the arrested suspects had criminal records and were also planning to target other individuals named by RAW.The CTD chief admitted that prosecution in transnational terrorism cases was challenging but assured that the CTD would pursue the case to ensure successful prosecution.
- In November 2025, IB in close coordination with the Counter-Terrorism Department (CTD), Sindh arrested a fisherman working as a spy for Indian intelligency agency RAW. Pakistan's Minister of Information Atta Tarar said Pakistani agencies have arrested a fisherman named Ijaz Mallah. Minister revealed that Mallah was earlier arrested by the Indian Coast Guard in September 2025 while he was out for fishing in his boat and mistakenly crossed into the Indian waters. Mallah under Indian custody was coerced and forced to work for Indian RAW by the Indian authorities. Mallah was given to task to spy on Pakistan Rangers and procure uniform of Pakistan Navy and Pakistan Rangers so to use these uniforms in an impending terrorist attack which was thwarted with the arrest of Mallah.
- In November 2025, IB alongwith CTD, Punjab busted ring of Indian spies scattered across different cities of Punjab.12 terrorists and spies linked with Indian agencies were arrested in Lahore, Bahawalpur and Faisalabad.CTD spokesperson confirms recovery of explosives, detonates, and weapons from the arrested Indian spies. CTD official further confirmed recovery of sensitive data, photos and videos captured by the Indian spies as part of intelligence gathering operation by the Indian intelligence agency RAW, which was successfully neutralized by IB and CTD led counterintelligence operation.

=== 2026 ===
- The Counter Terrorism Department of Punjab in coordination with IB arrested an Indian intelligence agent associated with RAW in January 2026. The alleged Indian agent, identified as Mujtaba, who was arrested in Lahore, was found in possession of explosive materials, weapons, and blueprints of important buildings. The CTD officials said explosives, two hand-grenades, six IEDs (improvised explosive devices), and 36 detonators were seized from the terrorists. Security fuses, wires, and cash were also confiscated during the operations, they added.
- In April 2026, Azad Kashmir Police in coordination with IB arrested an Indian intelligence agent associated with RAW from the Rawalakot. The agent was tasked to collect data of sensitive military sites, bridges, government buildings and schools for the future RAW sponsored terrorist activities. RAW was nurturing the alleged Indian spy for more sensitive terrorism related operations in Azad Kashmir that was thwarted by the IB's preemptive counterintelligence operation.

== Controversies ==
In the 1990s, Intelligence Bureau was frequently accused of being used for political purposes by successive governments. The agency gained notoriety for allegedly surveilling and harassing journalists, judges, and opposition politicians. During court proceedings in the mid-1990s, it was revealed that the IB had engaged in extensive telephone tapping of political opponents and members of the judiciary, drawing criticism from civil society and the media. In later years, the organization moved to reduce its political visibility, with no major disclosures of similar activities reported in the public domain. Former officials have stated that the agency deliberately avoided seeking policing or arrest powers to maintain operational focus and to prevent becoming entangled in legal or political controversies.

In February 2022, IB came under scrutiny following an incident involving prominent television anchor Iqrar Ul Hassan and his production team. The team alleged that IB officers at the Karachi office detained them for approximately three hours, subjected them to physical assault including electric shocks and stripping, and filmed them while blindfolded, in retaliation for exposing an alleged bribe-taking inspector. In response, the IB suspended five officials connected to the case under disciplinary rules.

== Bibliography ==
- Gauhar, Altaf. "How Intelligence Agencies Run Our Politics". The Nation. September 1997: 4.
