= Small Dam, Naryab =

Small Dam is located in Naryab, Tehsil Thal . Hangu District of Khyber-Pakhtunkhwa . It is one of a number of small water reservoir constructed in Khyber-Pakhtunkhwa to provide water for irrigation and drinking in times of drought. There are no other dam within 55 km^{2}. This dam was designed by Engr. Mussadiq Khan Bangash. The project economist was Mr. Ejaz Gul who carried out economic analysis of this dam. Dam has huge impact on the availability of water for household consumption and irrigation. It has increased the agriculture yield by 56% and increased the ground water availability by 31% in Naryab and surrounding. It is also an effective measure for the flood mitigation in the area.
