= Tahira Qazi =

Pakistani educationist (1951 – 2014)

Sitara-e-Shujaat Tahira Qazi
- طاھره قاضی
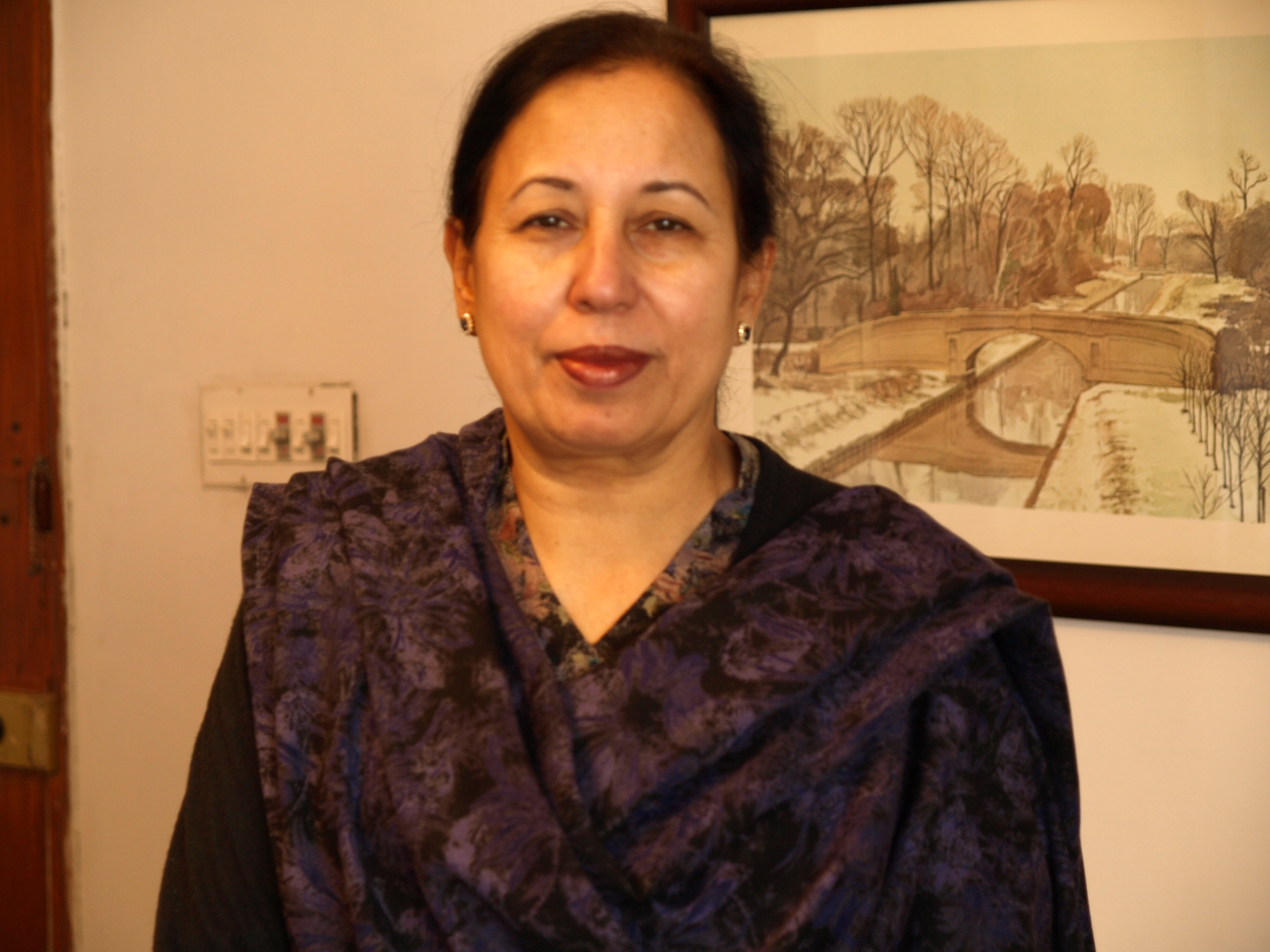
- Born: 1 July 1951; Mardan, Pakistan
- Died: 16 December 2014 (aged 63); Army Public School Peshawar, Pakistan
- Cause of death: Gunshot wound
- Resting place: Landi Arbab; 33° 58′ 46″ N, 71° 32′ 41″ E
- Education: University of Peshawar
- Occupation: Educationist
- Years active: 1994-2014
- Spouse: Qazi Zafarullah
- Children: 3
- Awards: Sitara-e-Shujaat (2015)

Tahira Qazi (1 July 1951 – 16 December 2014) was a Pakistani educationist and principal of Army Public School Peshawar who was killed in the Peshawar school attack on 16 December 2014.

Tahira Qazi was born on 1 July 1951 in Mardan, Pakistan, where she attended early schooling. She completed her master's degree in English from University of Peshawar and started her teaching career in the 1970s. Qazi married Pakistan Army colonel (now retired) Qazi Zafrullah in the 1980s. She was principal of Army Public School, Peshawar since 2006 and was set to retire in May 2015. According to her students, she taught English. She was married and had a daughter and two sons.

On 16 December 2014, Tehrik-i-Taliban Pakistan-affiliated terrorists attacked Army Public School Peshawar. During the attack, Qazi tried to protect the students and jumped forward in front of the militants and said, "I am their mother. Talk to me." She tried to negotiate with the terrorists but was shot in the head. Qazi was laid to rest in Landi Arbab.

Qazi was posthumously awarded the Sitara-e-Shujaat on Pakistan Day 2015 by President Mamnoon Hussain. A conference room of Khyber Pakhtunkhwa Assembly was renamed after her, as the "Tahira Qazi Conference Room".

== See also ==
- School massacres
- Syed Hamid Hussain
- Aitzaz Hassan
