= Naryab =

Coordinates: 33°29′2″N 70°46′53″E

Naryab نرياب Narai Obe ('thin water')
- Village and Union Council
- Interactive map of Naryab
- Country: Pakistan
- Region: Khyber Pakhtunkhwa
- District: Hangu District
- Tehsil: Doaba
- Main Problems: Naryab Road and Electricity
- Elevation: 969 m (3,179 ft)

Population
  - Total: 1,452
- Time zone: UTC+5 (PST)

Naryab/Nariäb(نرياب) is a town and union council of Tehsil Thal Hangu District in Khyber Pakhtunkhwa, Pakistan. Part of the Federally Administered Tribal Areas Its main Pashtun tribe is Bangash It belongs to Kohat Division. Its history dates back to at least 1770. The main tribe residing is Badha Khel.

== Geography ==
A small dam sits in the upper area of Naryab, which is used by local farmers for irrigation.

Naryab is bordered by Zargari to the north, Kahi to the east, Tora Wari to the west, and Doaba to the south. Doaba has recently become a trade center for the people of Naryab and other surrounding villages.

== Development ==
Issues facing Naryab include construction of roads and transportation, electricity, medical facilities and formal education. Naryab Road has become a point of contention between JUI-F and PTI, the two big political parties. Gas royalties above five crore rupees have been issued to Tehsil Thall for the construction of Naryab Road. The two parties are contesting the use of the funds. The struggle delayed construction for more than three years. The disagreement became prominent on social media. Prominent social media group Naryab Khabroona played an important role in raising various issues especially road construction. Naryab Khabroona is still playing a role in raising the core issues of Naryab.

Another main problem of Naryab is electricity. After the formation of PTI's government in Khyber-Pakhtunkhwa and the PML-N government, the electricity was disconnected for non-payment. Villagers claim that before 2013, WAPDA (electric utility) was delivering only 10 volts for two hours in 24 hours, making it unreasonable to pay more than two hundred thousand rupees for such limited service however in recent years the people of naryab use electric generators and mainly use solar panels and thus the electricity of Naryab was semi-restored.

== Tribes ==
Bangash

== History ==
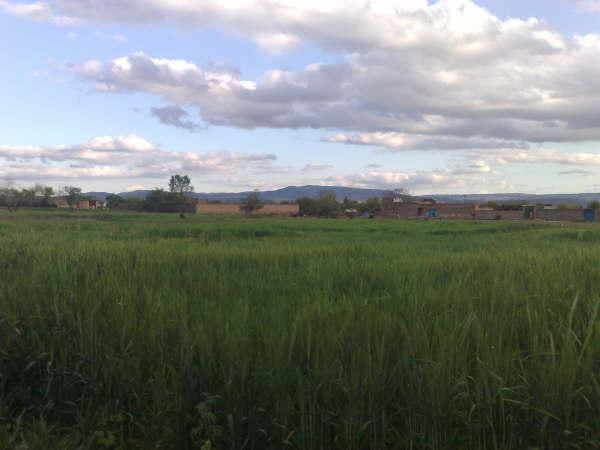

== Gallery ==
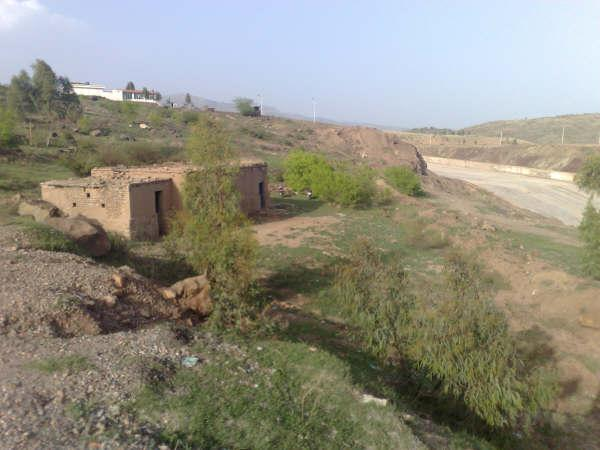

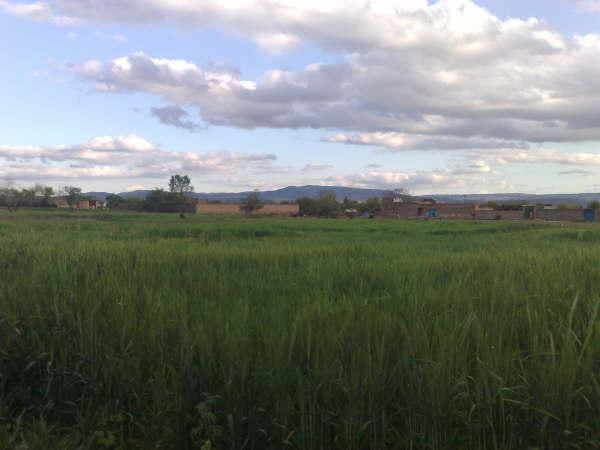
