= Fuad Asadullah Khan =

Pakistani intelligence officer

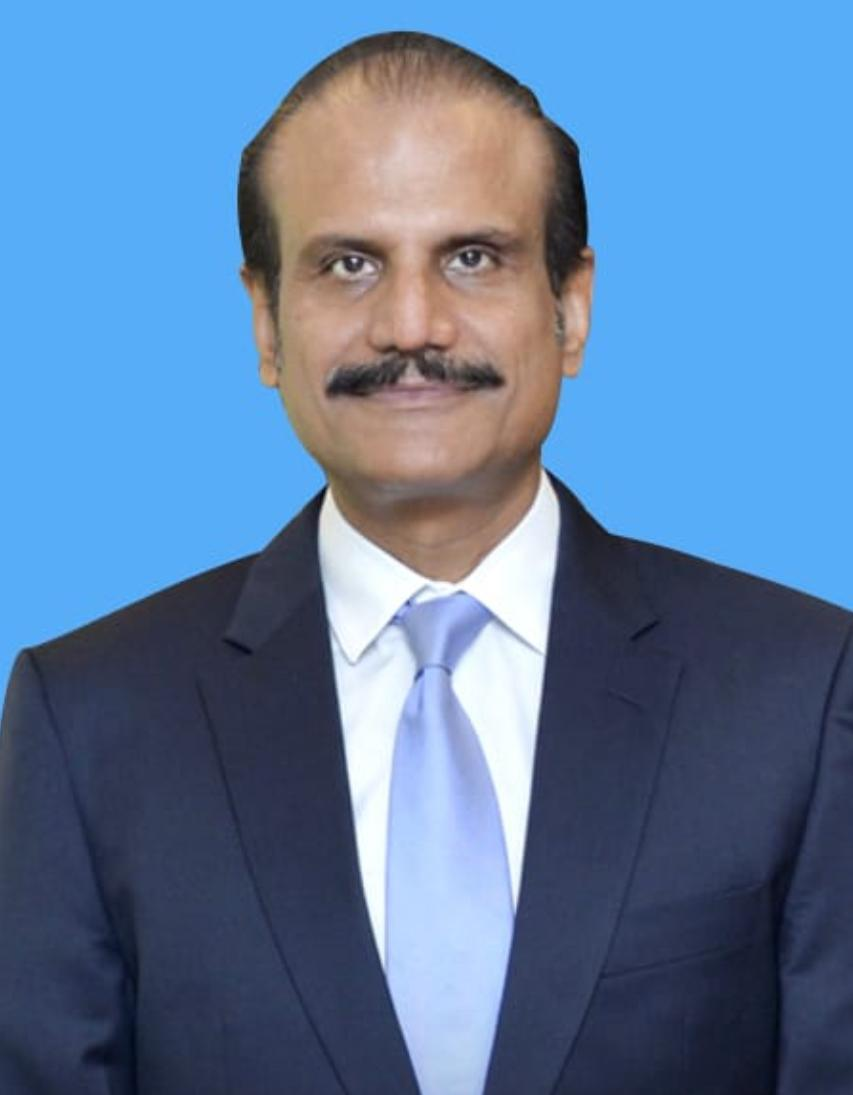

Director-General of the Intelligence Bureau (IB)
- Incumbent
- Assumed office 20 May 2022
- Appointed by: Prime Minister of Pakistan
- President: Asif Ali Zardari
- Prime Minister: Shehbaz Sharif
- Preceded by: Muhammad Sulaman Khan

Personal details
- Born: 19 December 1962 (age 63)
- Citizenship: Pakistani
- Education: Bachelor of Engineering (Electronics)
- Profession: Intelligence Officer
- Awards: Sitara-e-Shujaat Tamgha-e-Shujaat

Fuad Asadullah Khan is a BPS-22 officer of the Intelligence Bureau (IB) in Pakistan who has served as the Director-General IB since 20 May 2022.

Fuad Asadullah is the first DG IB who is a career Intelligence Bureau officer. With more than three decades of service, he has held several key operational and administrative positions within the Bureau, including serving as the commandant of the Intelligence Bureau Division Academy and Joint Director General at the Capital Region Headquarters in Islamabad.

== Early life and education ==
Fuad Asadullah Khan was born on 19 December 1962. He obtained a Bachelor of Engineering (Electronics) degree before joining the Intelligence Bureau Division in 1990 as Assistant Director.

== Career ==
=== Early career ===
Fuad Asadullah Khan began his career with Intelligence Bureau in 1990 as an Assistant Director and went on to serve in diverse operational and administrative roles across Pakistan, gaining extensive field and leadership experience.

=== Director General, Intelligence Bureau ===
On 20 April 2022, Fuad Asadullah Khan was appointed as the Director General of the Intelligence Bureau. He directly reports to the Prime Minister of Pakistan and is his chief security advisor on civilian side of the government. Following the elevation of the Intelligence Bureau to the status of a full-fledged federal Division in 2024, the Director General of the Intelligence Bureau also assumed the role of ex-officio Secretary of the Intelligence Bureau Division.

On 22 May 2026, government extended the tenure of Fawad Asadullah Khan as director general of the Intelligence Bureau (IB) after granting him a four-year extension in service.

On 14 Aug 2026, President Asif Ali Zardari approved the recommendation for the civil award Hilal-i-Imtiaz for DG IBD Fuad Asadullah Khan, which is likely to be conferred on 23 March 2027.

=== Operations ===
During his tenure, the Intelligence Bureau expanded its counterterrorism activities, focusing on the disruption of militant networks and criminal organizations. Operations attributed to this period include action against the Bilal Sabit gang, as well as the prevention of planned attacks reportedly linked to events such as the SCO Summit and Defence Day.

The Intelligence Bureau also conducted operations related to economic security, targeting financial crimes such as hundi/hawala, hoarding, smuggling, and human trafficking.

== Awards ==
Fuad Asadullah Khan has been decorated three times by the Government of Pakistan:

1. Tamgha-e-Shujaat by President Farooq Leghari in 1996.
2. Sitara-e-Shujaat by President Mamnoon Hussain in 2018.
3. Hilal-e-Imtiaz by President Asif Ali Zardari on 14 August 2025, in recognition of his contributions during the Pak-India Conflict (Operation Bunyanum Marsoos).
