= Samana Range =

Mountain ridge in Khyber Pakhtunkhwa, Pakistan

Coordinates: 33.21°N 69.17°E

The Samana Range is a mountain ridge in the Hangu District of the Khyber Pakhtunkhwa of Pakistan, commanding the southern boundary of Tirah. The ridge lies between the Khanki Valley on the north and the Miranzai Valley on the south, and extends for some 30 m. west from Hangu to the Samana Suk. It is some 1828 to 2133 metres high.

== History ==
Beyond the Samana Suk lies the pass, known as the Chagru Kotal, across which the Tirah Campaign marched in 1897. On the opposite hill on the other side of this road is the famous position of Dargai. After the Miranzai Expedition of 1891 this range was occupied by British troops and eleven posts were established along its crest, the two chief posts being Fort Lockhart and Fort Gulistan. In 1897 all the forts on the Samana were attacked by the Orakzais, this is when the Battle of Saragarhi took place and this and the Afridi attack on the Khyber Pass were the two chief causes of the Tirah Expedition. When Lord Curzon reorganized the frontier in 1900, British garrisons were withdrawn from the Samana forts, which were then held by a corps of tribal police 450 strong, called the Samana Rifles.
