= Tarwa Watkai =

Hill in Pakistan

Coordinates: 33°37′N 70°12′E

Tarwa Watkai is a hill in Pakistan near the town of Hangu. It has an elevation of 1,285 metres (4,216 ft) and is east of Turkmān Zhêy, a mountain in Afghanistan that has an elevation of 1,225 metres (4,019 ft).
