= Village Ibrahimzai, Hangu District =

Coordinates: 33°33′19″N 71°09′05″E

Ibrahimzai is a village situated in the jurisdiction of Hangu, Khyber Pakhtunkhwa, Pakistan.

It has about 6,000 voters according to the last voters list in the last election. Dar-e-Abbas Zyarat, Zyarat Bara (12)Imam and Imam Takhat are the religious and attractive places of this village. A water canal is flowing between the village from west to east.

The village containing 100% population (more than 10,000) of Shia Asna Ashari (Fiqha-e-Jaffareyah). Juma prayer offering at the village from 1983 to till date in the holy shrine of Ghazi Abbas Alamdar (time 13:15).

== Notable residents ==
On 2014-01-06, local 14-year-old Aitzaz Hasan died while preventing a suicide bomber from entering his school of 2,000 students. Aitzaz was hailed as a national hero. For his act, the office of Pakistan Prime Minister Nawaz Sharif had advised President Mamnoon Husain to confer Aitzaz Hasan with the high civil award of Sitara-e-Shujaat (Star of Bravery). He was named as the Herald's Person of the Year for 2014.
