= Dallan, Khyber Pakhtunkhwa =

Coordinates: 33°21′30″N 70°38′47″E

Dallan, Khyber-Pakhtunkhwa
- Town and union council
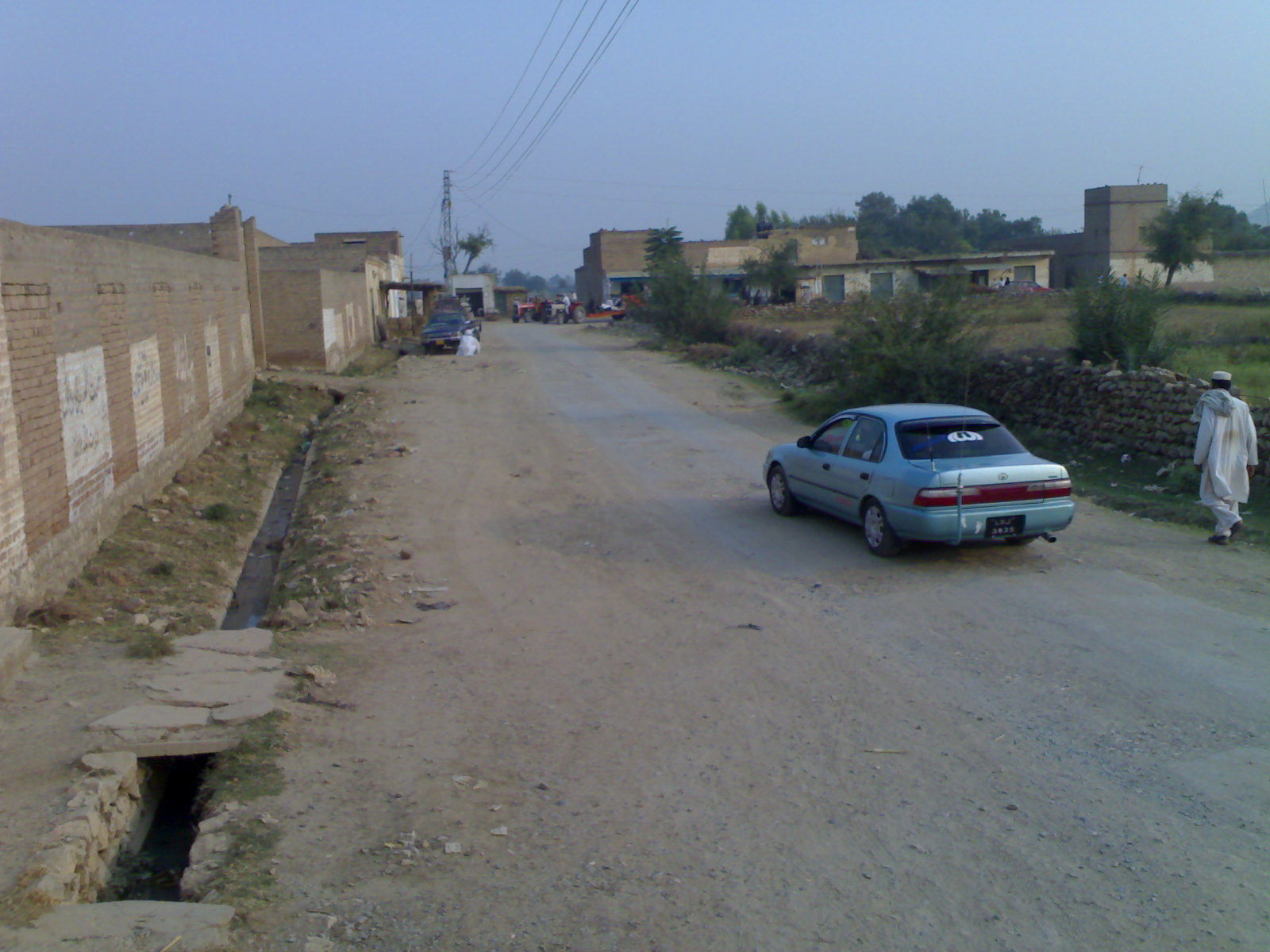
- Dallan KPK, Pakistan
- Interactive map of Dallan, Khyber-Pakhtunkhwa
- Country: Pakistan
- Province: Khyber Pakhtunkhwa
- District: Hangu District
- Time zone: UTC+5 (PST)

Dallan is a town and union council of Tehsil Thal Hangu District in Khyber Pakhtunkhwa province of Pakistan. It is located at 33°21'30N 70°38'47E and has an altitude of 856 metres (2,808 ft).
