= Aitzaz =

Aitzaz may refer to:

- Aitzaz Ahsan (born 1945), Pakistani politician and former Leader of the House in the Senate of Pakistan
- Aitzaz Hasan (1997–2014), school boy from Khyber Pakhtunkhwa, Pakistan, who died while preventing a suicide bomber from entering his school
  - Aitzaz Hasan Shaheed High School, in Hangu, Khyber Pakhtunkhwa, Pakistan
