= Khan Bari =

- Town and union council
- Country: Pakistan
- Province: Khyber Pakhtunkhwa
- District: Hangu District
- Time zone: UTC+5 (PST)

Khan Bari is a town and union council of Hangu District in Khyber Pakhtunkhwa province of Pakistan.
