= Malik Saad =

Pakistani police officer (1959–2007)

- Deputy IG Malik Saad
- Born: Malik Muhammad Saad Khan; 19 May 1959; Abbottabad, North-West Frontier Province (now Khyber Pakhtunkhwa), West-Pakistan
- Died: 27 January 2007 (aged 47); Peshawar, North-West Frontier Province
- Burial place: Kohat, North-West Frontier Province (now-Khyber Pakhtunkhwa)
- Alma mater: Cadet College Kohat
- Military career
- Allegiance: Pakistan
- Branch: Police Service of Pakistan
- Service years: 1983–2007
- Rank: Deputy Inspector General
- Unit: Frontier Police – Peshawar Branch
- Commands: Chief Capital City Police Officer (CCPO); DG Peshawar Development Authority; Adminis. Municipal Corporation; Commandant Frontier Reserve Police
- Conflicts: Insurgency and terrorism in northwestern Pakistan
- Awards: Nishan-e-Shujaat (2007)

Malik Muhammad Saad Khan Shaheed (19 May 1959 – 27 January 2007), was a senior police officer, engineer, and former Chief Capital City Police Officer (CCPO) of Peshawar, North-West Frontier Province, Pakistan. He was in charge of security in the provincial capital of Peshawar. He was killed in a suicide bomb attack while reviewing security arrangements during a Shia procession during the Islamic month of Muharram on 27 January 2007.

== Death and legacy ==
Malik Saad was martyred in a suicide attack on 27 January 2007, aged 47. His funeral was attended by over 200,000 people and his legacy remains an integral part of the history of the Khyber Pakhtunkhwa province and the Civil Services of Pakistan.

== Honors ==
Numerous buildings and charities have been named after him, including the Malik Muhammad Saad Khan Shaheed flyover, a project which Malik Saad personally began during his tenure as DG CD&MDD and the Peshawar Police Lines, which was renamed the Malik Saad Shaheed Police Lines in his honour. Malik Saad was awarded the Nishan-e-Shujaat, the highest civilian award for gallantry.

== See also ==
- Tahir Dawar
- Safwat Ghayur

Preceded by Haji Habib ur Rehman	Chief Capital City Police Officer Peshawar; August 2006 – January 2007	Succeeded by Abdul Majeed Khan Marwat
