= Safwat Ghayur =

Pakistani police officer (1959–2010)

- صفوت غیور
- Addl. IG Safwat Ghayur
- Born: 14 July 1959; Karachi, West Pakistan
- Died: 4 August 2010 (aged 51); Peshawar, Khyber Pakhtunkhwa
- Burial place: Peshawar, Khyber Pakhtunkhwa
- Military career
- Allegiance: Pakistan
- Branch: Police Service of Pakistan
- Service years: 1981–2010
- Rank: Addl. Inspector General
- Unit: Frontier Police – Peshawar Branch
- Commands: Commandant Frontier Constabulary; Commandant National Police Academy; Chief Capital City Police Officer (CCPO)
- Conflicts: War in North-West Pakistan
- Awards: Hilal-e-Shujaat (2010)

Safwat Ghayur (Urdu: صفوت غیور, romanized: Ṣafwat Ġayūr; 14 July 1959 – 4 August 2010) was an Additional Inspector General of the Police Service of Pakistan, serving as the commandant of the Frontier Constabulary of Khyber Pakhtunkhwa. Well known for his leadership in the fight against terrorism, he was killed in a suicide attack by the Tehreek-e-Taliban Pakistan.

== Biography ==
Safwat Ghayur was the nephew of Pakistan Movement activist Sardar Abdur Rab Nishtar, a cousin of the former Governor of Khyber Pakhtunkhwa, Owais Ahmed Ghani, and a cousin of former Chief of Armed forces General Abdul Waheed Kakar. His brother-in-law, Aftab Ahmad Khan Sherpao, was twice the Chief Minister of the province, as well as Interior Minister of Pakistan.

Safwat Ghayur joined the Police Service of Pakistan in 1981 (9th CTP) and worked initially as an Assistant Superintendent of Police (ASP), at various stations of Peshawar, and then as Senior Superintendent of Police (SSP) of Peshawar. He became Deputy Commandant in the National Police Academy of Pakistan and later on Capital City Police Officer of Peshawar. Since December 2009, he served as Commandant of the Frontier Constabulary, which acts as a policing force in the semi-autonomous tribal areas of Pakistan. He had gained a reputation for being actively involved in police work, having been shot in the shoulder in 1994 in a shootout with a criminal, and was widely praised as a hero and became a well known police officer in the fight against terrorism.

== Death and legacy ==
Safwat Ghayur was killed in a targeted suicide bombing at the Frontier Constabulary Chowk, Peshawar on the evening of 4 August 2010, when he was driving away from his office without any special security protocol. A pedestrian was killed on the scene and two others later died in a hospital. Eight kilograms of explosives were used and "the severed head of the suspected bomber, who appeared to be in his teens, was found some 20 feet from the gutted vehicle of Mr Ghayur." The internationally designated terrorist group Tehrik-i-Taliban Pakistan claimed responsibility.

Interior Minister of Pakistan Rehman Malik honoured him posthumously with the Hilal-e-Shujaat. He was one of the number of police officers killed while in duty from Khyber-Pakhtunkhwa Police; following his colleagues Malik Saad and Abid Ali.

== See also ==
- Tahir Dawar
