= PK-93 Hangu =

Pakistani electoral district

- Constituency for the Khyber Pakhtunkhwa Assembly
- Region: Hangu District

Current constituency
- Party: Pakistan Tehreek-e-Insaf
- Member(s): Shah Faisal Khan
- Created from: PK-42 Hangu-I (2002-2018); PK-83 Hangu-I and PK-84 Hangu-II(2018-2023)

PK-93 Hangu (پی کے-93 ہنگو) is a constituency for the Khyber Pakhtunkhwa Assembly of the Khyber Pakhtunkhwa province of Pakistan.

== See also ==
- PK-92 Kohat-III
- PK-94 Orakzai
