= Yousuf Khan (Pakistani politician) =

Member of the National Assembly of Pakistan from Khyber Pakhtunkhwa (2024–2029)

- یوسف خان

Member of the National Assembly of Pakistan
- Incumbent
- Assumed office 29 February 2024
- Constituency: NA-36 Hangu-cum-Orakzai

Personal details
- Party: PTI (2024-present)

Yousuf Khan (Urdu: یوسف خان), is a Pakistani politician who is member of the National Assembly of Pakistan since 29 February 2024.

== Political career ==
Khan won the 2024 Pakistani general election from NA-36 Hangu-cum-Orakzai as an Independent candidate. He received 73,076 votes while runners up Ubaidullah of Jamiat Ulema-e-Islam (F) received 34,324 votes.
