= Haider Ali Shah (politician) =

Pakistani politician

Member of the National Assembly of Pakistan
- In office 2008–2013
- Constituency: NA-16 (Hangu)

Syed Haider Ali Shah is a Pakistani politician who had been a member of the National Assembly of Pakistan from 2008 to 2013.

== Political career ==
He was elected to the National Assembly of Pakistan from Constituency NA-16 (Hangu) as a candidate of Awami National Party (ANP) in the 2008 Pakistani general election. He received 22,180 votes and defeated Maulana Mian Hussain Jalali, a candidate of Muttahida Majlis-e-Amal (MMA).

He ran for the seat of the National Assembly from Constituency NA-16 (Hangu) as a candidate of ANP in the 2013 Pakistani general election but was unsuccessful. He received 4,479 votes and lost the seat to Khayal Zaman Orakzai.
