= Mardukhel Banda =

Village in Hangu District, Pakistan

Mardukhel Banda is a village in the Hangu District, Khyber Pakhtunkhwa Province, Pakistan.

Mardukhel Banda is located in Hangu City near Hangu Township where Pashtun Tribes like Orakzai are inhabitants. Orakzai are of Turkic Persian and a mixture of Tirahi origin.

It is a Sunni Islam village that coincides with a Shia village named Saidano Banda. Saidano means (Syed) – descendants of the Last Prophet Muhammad. The term Banda means village In Pashto. These two villages have a history of wars and conflicts due to their view of seeing things is different.

This conflict has led to hate and discrimination between both villages as they are in touch. Their boundaries consist of a graveyard that connects these two villages and have routes straight from Mardukhel to Saidano Banda.

The Mardukhel village also consists of people from the mountainous areas of Tirah. Proud of their Pashtun/Persian culture and distinct facial features. They speak the Tirahi dialect of Pashto, which has nearly gone extinct as only a few of the tribal elders speak that dialect.

Mardukhel Banda is bounded by a river called the Jabai Toi.
