= NA-36 Hangu-cum-Orakzai =

Constituency of the National Assembly of Pakistan

- Constituency for the National Assembly of Pakistan
- Region: Hangu District and Orakzai District
- Electorate: 556,060

Current constituency
- Party: Pakistan Tehreek-e-Insaf
- Member: Yousuf Khan
- Created from: NA-33 Hangu

NA-36 Hangu-cum-Orakzai (این اے-36، ہنگو-کم-اورکزئی) is a constituency for the National Assembly of Pakistan, it covers the whole of Hangu District. The constituency was formerly known as NA-16 (Hangu) from 1977 to 2018. The name changed to NA-33 (Hangu) after the delimitation in 2018. NA-36 (Hangu-cum-Orakzai) and Orakzai District were also included after the delimitation in 2022.

== Members of Parliament ==
=== 1977–2002: NA-16 (Hangu) ===
Election	Member	Party
1977	Fakhruz Zaman Khan	PNA
1985	Nawabzada Salahuddin	Independent
1988	Ayub Khan Allai	IJI
1990	Nawabzada Salahuddin Saeed	JUI-F
1993	M. Nawaz Allai	PML-N
1997	M. Nawaz Allai	PML-N

=== 2002–2018: NA-16 Hangu ===
Election	Member	Party
2002	Akhunzada Muhammad Sadiq	MMA
2008	Syed Haider Ali Shah	ANP
2013	Khayal Zaman Orakzai	PTI

=== 2018–2023: NA-33 Hangu ===
Election	Member	Party
2018	Khayal Zaman Orakzai	PTI
2022	Nadeem Khayal	PTI

=== 2024–present: NA-36 Hangu-cum-Orakzai ===
Election	Member	Party
2024	Yousuf Khan	PTI

== Elections since 2002 ==
=== 2002 general election ===
2002 General Election: NA-16 Hangu
Party	Candidate	Votes	%	±%
MMA	Akhunzada Muhammad Sadiq	25,252	56.15	
ANP	Hassan Ahmed Khan	5,234	11.64	
PML-Q	Shaharyar Khan Bangash	4,189	9.31	
PPP (S)	Muhammad Idress Niazi	4,035	8.97	
PTI	Zaman Noor Bangash	3,137	6.97	
PAT	Kishwar Sultana	1,503	3.34	
Independent	Muhammad Aslam Khan	758	1.69	
Independent	Hafiz Khursheed Ali Khan	447	0.99	
PML-N	Javed Ibrahim Paracha	421	0.94	
Majority		20,018	44.51	
Turnout		44,976	28.71	
MMA gain from PML (N)				

A total of 1,249 votes were rejected.

=== 2008 general election ===
2008 General Election: NA-16 Hangu
Party	Candidate	Votes	%	±%
ANP	Syed Haider Ali Shah	22,180	37.93	+26.29
MMA	Maulana Mian Hussain Jalali	19,513	33.37	−22.78
Independent	Dr Syed Ghazi Gulab Jamal	16,404	28.05	
Independent	Abdul Wakeel	224	0.38	
Independent	Azmat Ali Khan Bangash	155	0.27	
Majority		2,667	4.56	
Turnout		58,476	31.80	+3.09
ANP gain from MMA				

A total of 1,212 votes were rejected.

=== 2013 general election ===
2013 General Election: NA-16 Hangu
Party	Candidate	Votes	%	±%
PTI	Khayal Zaman Orakzai	24,067	37.06	
JUI-F	Maulana Mian Hussain Jalali	21,137	32.55	
PML-N	Malik Khalid Naeem	5,411	8.33	
PPPP	Syed Ibne Ali	4,700	7.24	
ANP	Syed Haider Ali Shah	4,479	6.90	−31.03
JI	Muhammad Aslam	1,777	2.74	
Independent	Arif Hussain	1,327	2.04	
Independent	Azeem Ullah	813	1.25	
Independent	Hassan Ahmed Khan	479	0.74	
Independent	Umar Fayaz	382	0.59	
Independent	Khan Ameer	361	0.56	
Majority		2,930	4.51	
Turnout		64,933	30.81	−0.99
PTI gain from ANP				

A total of 1,657 votes were rejected.

=== 2018 general election ===
General elections were held on 25 July 2018.

General election 2018: NA-33 Hangu
Party	Candidate	Votes	%	±%
PTI	Khayal Zaman Orakzai	28,819	37.00	
MMA	Attiqur Rehman	27,968	35.91	
Others	Others (eleven candidates)	21,104	27.09	
Turnout		81,315	29.47	
Total valid votes		77,891	95.79	
Rejected ballots		3,424	4.21	
Majority		851	1.09	
Registered electors		275,947		
PTI hold		Swing	N/A	

=== By-election 2022 ===
The seat became vacant after the death of Khayal Zaman Orakzai, the previous MNA from this seat. By-elections were held on 17 April 2022. PTI's Nadeem Khayal won this seat by securing 20,772 votes against JUI-F's Obaidullah, who was supported by the Pakistan Democratic Movement, who received 18,244 votes.

By-election 2022: NA-33 Hangu
Party	Candidate	Votes	%	±%
PTI	Nadeem Khayal	20,772	48.75	▲11.75
JUI (F)	Obaidullah	18,244	42.82	N/A
Others	Others (three candidates)	3,595	8.44	
Turnout		43,148	13.53	▼15.94
Total valid votes		42,611	98.76	▲2.97
Rejected ballots		537	1.24	▼2.97
Majority		2,528	5.93	▲4.84
Registered electors		318,919		
PTI hold				

=== 2024 general election ===
General elections were held on 8 February 2024. Yousuf Khan won the election with 73,347 votes.

General election 2024: NA-36 Hangu-cum-Orakzai
Party	Candidate	Votes	%	±%
PTI	Yousuf Khan (Note: Filed nomination papers as PTI candidate but ECP allowed him to run as an Independent)	73,347	54.52	▲5.77
JUI (F)	Obaidullah	35,178	26.15	▼16.67
Others	Others (seventeen candidates)	25,977	19.20	
Turnout		139,162	25.03	▲11.50
Total valid votes		134,522	96.67	
Rejected ballots		3,740	3.33	
Majority		38,169	28.37	▲22.44
Registered electors		556,060		

== See also ==
- NA-35 Kohat
- NA-37 Kurram
