= Decorations Act, 1975 =

Constitution of Pakistan

Parliament of Pakistan
- Enacted by: Parliament of Pakistan
- Enacted: 24 April 1975
- Commenced: 1975
- Administered by: Ministry of Finance and Revenue
- Status: In force

Decorations Act 1975 is a law enacted in April 1975 by the Parliament of Pakistan. It allows the government, in particular the president to confer, withdraw, postpone or announce civil and gallantry awards for Pakistani and foreign citizens. It also allows president to discontinue active awards, to restore discontinued awards or to establish new decorations through prime minister's office.

It is particularly aimed at to decide the eligibility criteria to confer awards in various fields such as art, literature, academic activities, sports, philosophy, public service or history. It also seeks to recognize the contribution of citizens or foreign nationals to the national interest of Pakistan or other private or public endeavors.

== Purpose ==
- No person may discontinue, establish or confer civil and gallantry awards without president's order.
- No Pakistani citizen may accept foreign awards, including medals, titles, bars or honors without approval of federal government.
- Any government decision regarding the awards shall be published in the official gazette of Pakistan.
- The president may confer civil and gallantry awards posthumously.

== Penalty ==
- A person who violates the provisions of Decorations act may be punished with an amount of up to PKR20,000.
- A Pakistani citizen who accepts foreign awards offered by a sovereign state without approval of the federal government of Pakistan may be convinced for practicing such efforts.

== See also ==
- Constitution of Pakistan
