= Aitzaz Hasan =

Pakistani student and heroic figure

Aitzaz Hasan Bangash SS
- Aitzaz Hasan
- Born: circa 1999; Hangu, Khyber Pakhtunkhwa, Pakistan
- Died: 6 January 2014 (aged 15); Hangu, Khyber Pakhtunkhwa, Pakistan
- Occupation: Student
- Known for: Prevented suicide bomber from carrying out a terrorist attack at Aitzaz Hasan Shaheed High School
- Relatives: Mujahid Ali Bangash (father)
- Awards: Sitara-e-Shujaat (posthumous)

Aitzaz Hasan Bangash (Note: Also spelled as Aitizaz and Aitezaz) (c. 1999 - 6 January 2014; Urdu: اعتزاز حسن) was a 15-year-old Pakistani student who died on 6 January 2014 while preventing a suicide bomber from entering his school in Ibrahimzai, in the Hangu district of the Khyber Pakhtunkhwa province in north-west Pakistan. More than 2,000 students were attending classes at the time of the incident. The school was later renamed to Aitzaz Hasan Shaheed (martyr) High School. His death anniversary is observed annually throughout Pakistan. His life is covered by the biographical film Salute.

Aitzaz's successful effort in saving his classmates captured the hearts of the nation, and he was hailed as a martyr and national hero. The government of Pakistan posthumously awarded him the Sitara-e-Shujaat (Star of Valour). He was named as the Herald (Pakistan)'s Person of the Year for 2014.

== Background ==
Aitzaz lived in Ibrahimzai, a village in north-west Pakistan. Ibrahimzai is home to a large population of the Pakistani minority Shia Islam sect. Shia Islam is considered heretical by some armed groups, such as Lashkar-e-Jhangvi, which have attacked and killed Shia Muslims.

Aitzaz's school is the only one in Ibrahimzai.

== Life ==
Aitzaz Hasan was born to a Bangash Pashtun family of Hangu. His father is Mujahid Ali, who was in the United Arab Emirates at the time of the attack. It was typical for men in this impoverished region to go abroad, including to the Gulf region, to provide for their families.

Aitzaz was known for openly criticizing armed radical groups. A local resident said "Aitzaz Hasan used to tell all that one day he would capture some suicide bomber, and his class fellows used to laugh, but this boy proved what he said, and I am sad that he left us too early."

== Death ==
On 6 January 2014, Aitzaz was outside the school gate of his government high school, Ibrahimzai, in Hangu, with two other schoolmates. Aitzaz had not been allowed to join the morning assembly as he had been late in reaching the school that day.

One account states that around this time, a 20-to-25-year-old man approached the gate and stated he was there to "take admission". One of the students noticed a detonator on the man's vest, whereupon Aitzaz's schoolmates ran inside, possibly to raise alarm, while Aitzaz confronted the suicide bomber and grappled with him. The terrorist then detonated his vest, killing himself and Aitzaz in the explosion.

According to other accounts, Aitzaz was on his way to school when he spotted a suspicious person. When Aitzaz tried to stop him, he started walking faster towards the school. In an attempt to stop the bomber, Aitzaz threw a stone at him, which failed to hit him. Then Aitzaz ran towards the person and bear-hugged him, prompting the suicide bomber to detonate his explosive-laden vest. Aitzaz died at the scene. No other students were harmed.

Aitzaz's cousin recounted: "He told them 'I'm going to stop him. He is going to school to kill my friends'. He wanted to capture this suicide bomber."

== Aftermath ==
Aitzaz's father said that his son made a sacrifice to save the lives of others: "My son made his mother cry, but saved hundreds of mothers from crying for their children." Scores of people attended his funeral to pay their respects. A floral wreath was laid on Aitzaz's grave on behalf of the Pakistan Army chief. Aitzaz's story led to an outpouring of emotion on television and on social media, where the hashtag #onemillionaitzazs trended on Twitter. A Facebook page has been set up in tribute to his act.

The terrorist group Lashkar-e-Jhangvi claimed responsibility for the attack.

Then Information Minister for Khyber Pakhtunkhwa, Shah Farman, called Aitzaz a "real hero and true face of the people of Khyber Pakhtunkhwa".

Pakistani Chief of the Army Staff General Raheel Sharif called Aitzaz "a national hero, who has sacrificed his today for our tomorrow."

Malala Yousafzai, another prominent Pakistani teenager at the time, and an education activist who was the winner of the 2014 Nobel Peace Prize, described Aitzaz as "brave and courageous" and said "his bravery must never be forgotten".

The political party Jamiat Ulema-e-Islam (F), led by Fazal-ur-Rehman, described Aitzaz as a "mujahid", and a "symbol of resistance against terrorism".

On 12 January 2014, the government of Pakistan announced the establishment of the Aitzaz Hasan Fund, a trust fund for Aitzaz's family. On 14 January, the provincial governmental representatives announced a Rs. 5 million (US$18,000) package for his family and renamed his school the Aitzaz Hasan Shaheed High School.

A hostel constructed at College of Electrical and Mechanical Engineering in Rawalpindi was named after him.

== Popular culture ==
- Salute – a 2016 Pakistani biographical film directed, written, and produced by Shahzad Rafique, starred Ali Mohtesham as Aitzaz.

== Awards and honors ==
Many people demanded that the Nishan-e-Haider, or a similar award, be awarded to Aitzaz posthumously. The office of Pakistan Prime Minister Nawaz Sharif then recommended President Mamnoon Husain to confer Aitzaz with the high civil award Sitara-e-Shujaat (Star of Bravery). The award was received by Aitzaz's family on 23 March during Pakistan's national day.

On 12 January 2014, the International Human Rights Commission (IHRC) bestowed a global bravery award on Aitzaz.

Aitzaz was named as Herald's Person of the Year 2014. Herald's annual Person of the Year project sets out to recognize those individuals in Pakistan who had a profound influence on the news and who embodied, for good or ill, what was important about the year. Aitzaz, whose sacrifice attained further poignancy after the 16 December attack on Peshawar's Army Public School, emerged as the winner in a three-way voting process that included online voting, postal ballots, and input from a panel of ten eminent Pakistanis. In the Herald's 2015 issue, Malala Yousafzai – Herald's Person of the Year for 2012 – pays tribute to Hasan, writing: "Our country is blessed with brave people. The story of Aitzaz Hasan reflects their reliance, courage, and bravery."
