= Akhunzada Muhammad Sadiq =

Pakistani politician

Member of the National Assembly of Pakistan
- In office 16 November 2002 – 15 November 2007
- Constituency: NA-36 (Hangu-cum-Orakzai)

Akhunzada Muhammad Sadiq was Pakistani politician. He was member of the 12th National Assembly of Pakistan from NA-36 (Hangu-cum-Orakzai).

== See also ==
- List of members of the 12th National Assembly of Pakistan
