= Miranzai Valley =

Valley in Khyber Pakhtunkhwa, Pakistan

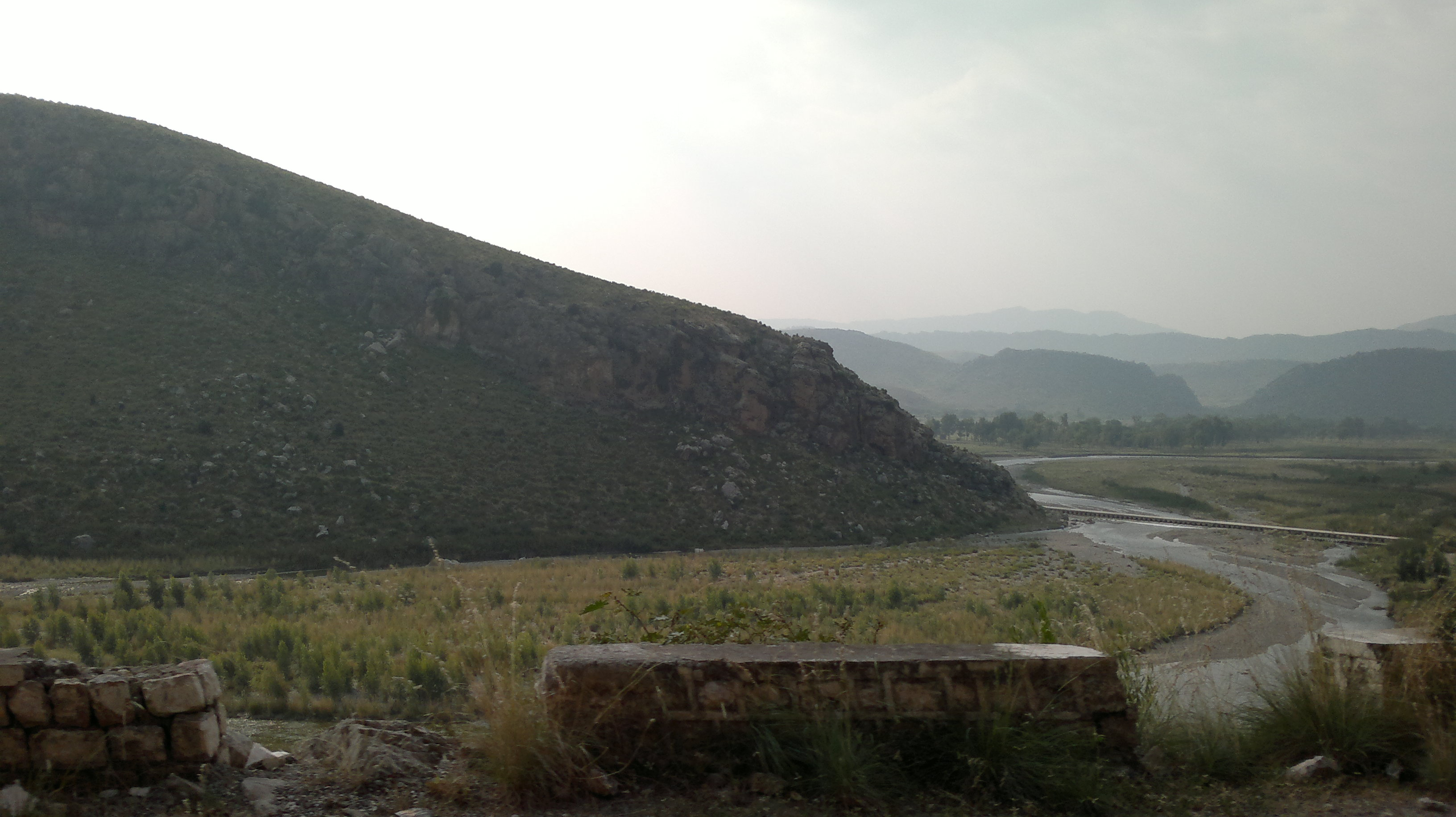
Road from Kohat to Hangu

The Miranzai Valley, also Hangu, is a mountainous valley situated in the Kohat and Hangu districts in the North-West Frontier Province of Pakistan. It is made up of two valleys, draining from the southwest into the Kurram and northeast into the Kohat Tai. It is divided into upper and lower Miranzai. It extends from the Bangash and Orakzai hills to the Bangashs. It is 40 miles (64 km) in length and is 546 square miles (1,410 km^{2}) in area. East of Hangu there are numerous smaller valleys; west of Hangu, consisting of all of the upper portion of the valley, there is a broad and open plain, bare of trees. There are many ravines in this and the surrounding area, with many inhabitants, predominantly the Bangash and Orakzai peoples.

British military expeditions occurred in the area when it was still part of India in the late 19th century due to disturbance. Until 1893, this valley was ruled by the Khans of Hangu who governed the whole country from the Indus to the Kurram. For instance, Ghulamm Muhammad Khan, who was the eighth Khan Raees e Bangash of Hangu is said to have ruled over Baizai (Kohat) and as far as Matanni in the Peshawar district.
