= Hangu District, Pakistan =

Hangu District ضلع ہنگو هنګو ولسوالۍ
- District
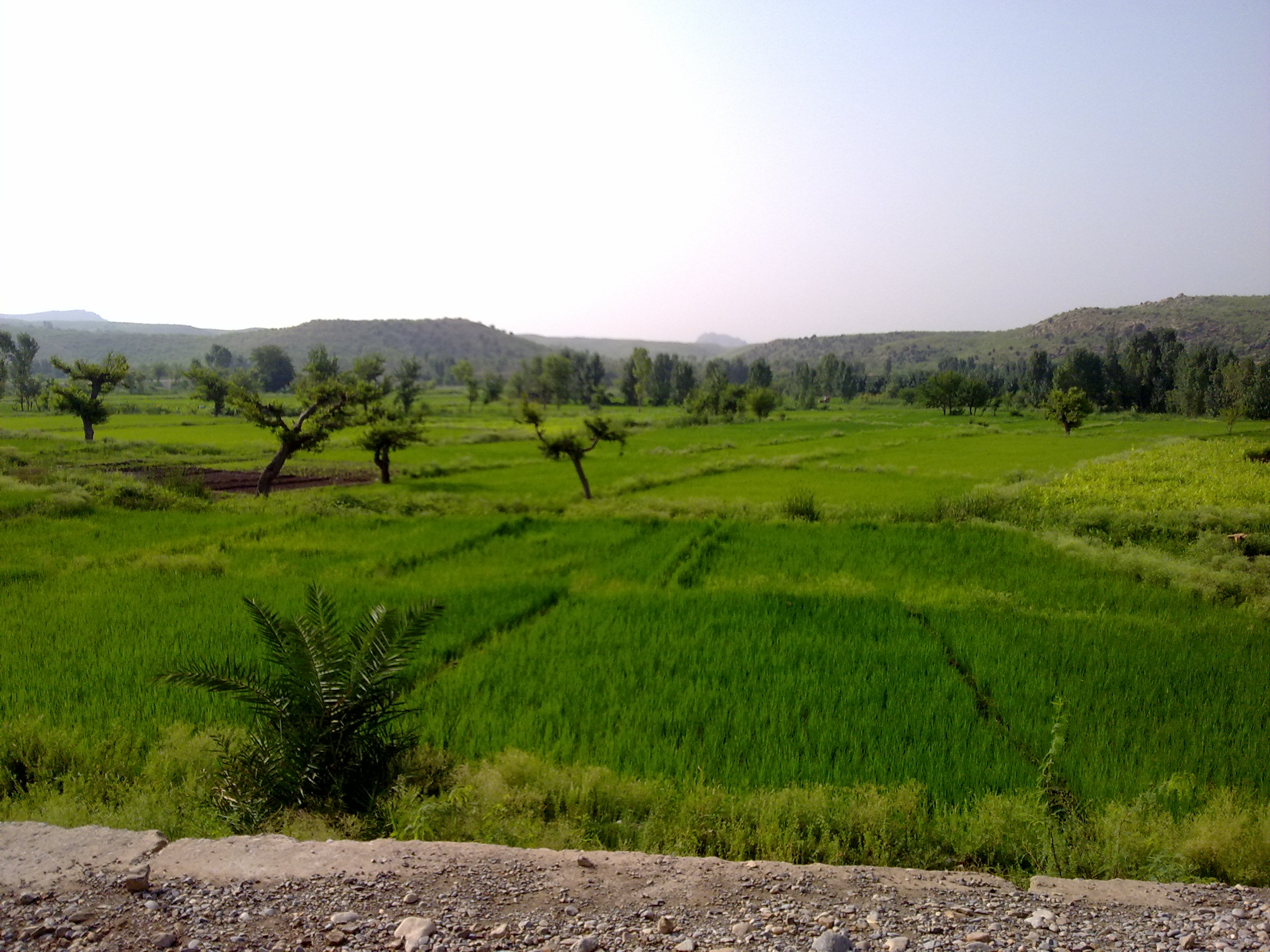
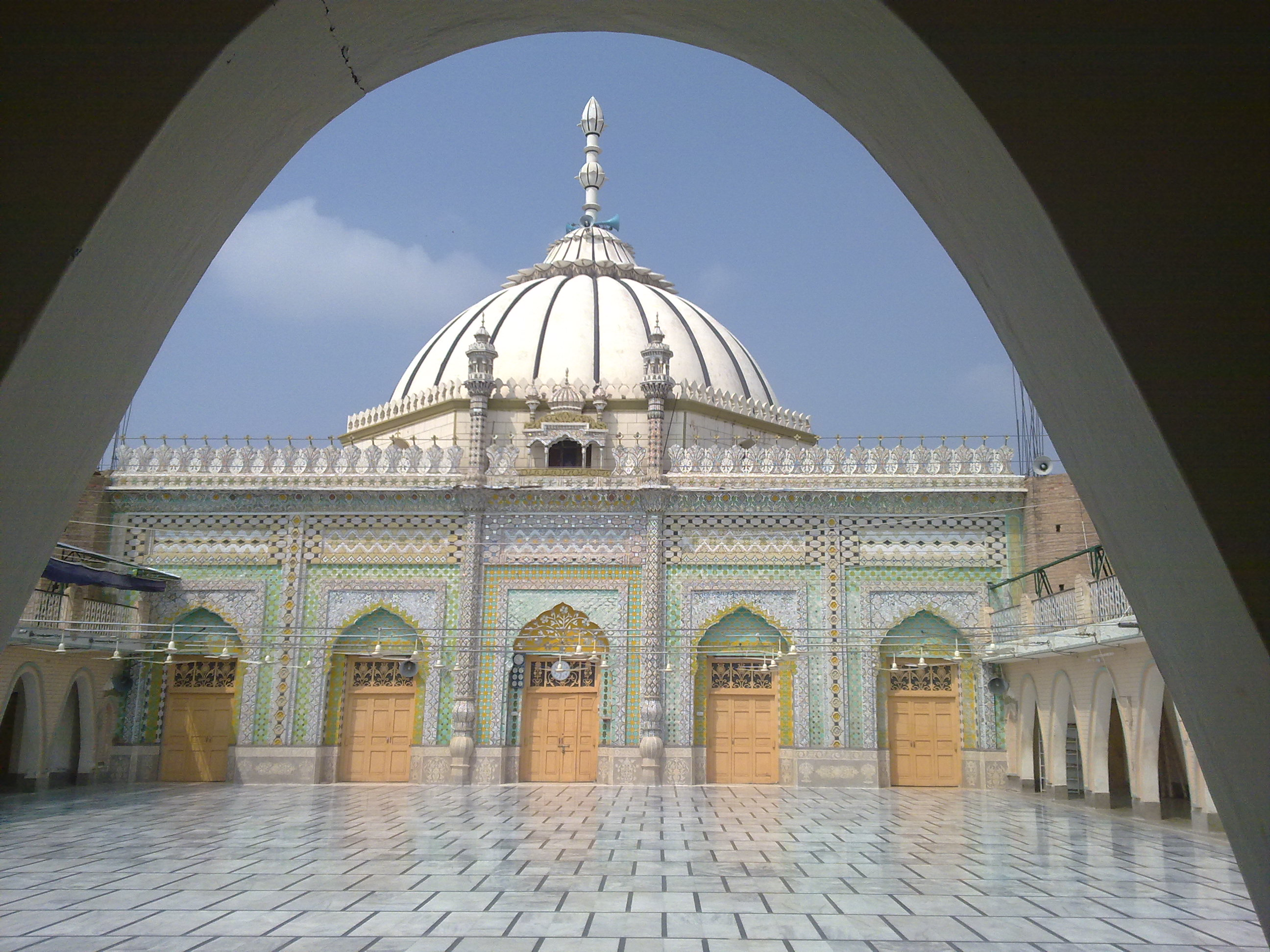
- Top: Mamu Khora road Bottom: Thal Gambad Masjid

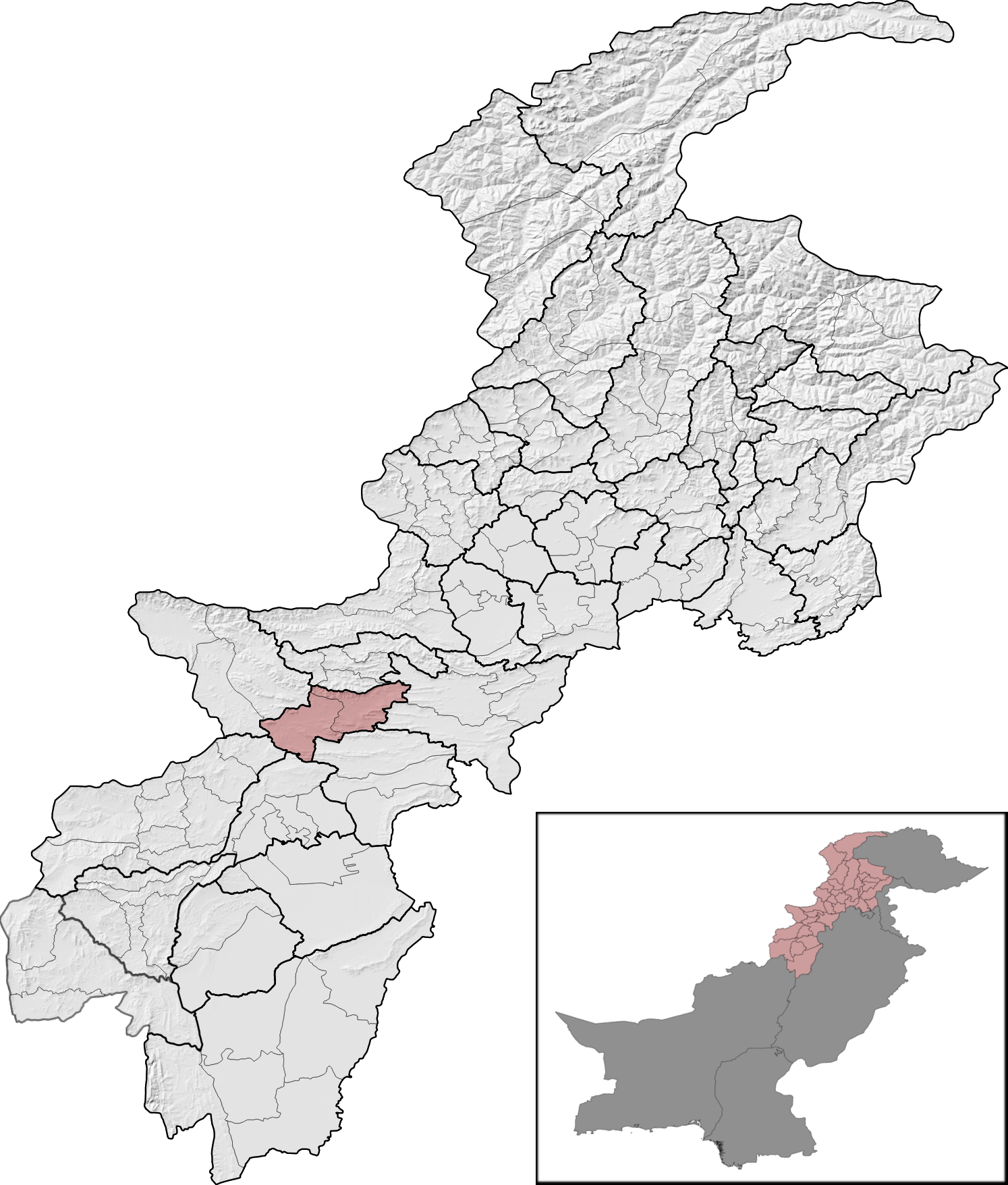
- Hangu District (red) in Khyber Pakhtunkhwa
- Country: Pakistan
- Province: Khyber Pakhtunkhwa
- Division: Kohat
- Headquarters: Hangu

Government
  - Type: District Administration
  - Deputy Commissioner: Irfan Ullah
  - District Police Officer: N/A
  - District Health Officer: N/A

Area
  - District: 1,097 km^{2} (424 sq mi)

Population (2023)
  - District: 528,902
  - Density: 482.1/km^{2} (1,249/sq mi)
  - Urban: 85,727 (16.21%)
  - Rural: 443,175 (83.79%)

Literacy
  - Literacy rate: Total: (43.15%); Male: (66.04%); Female: (22.02%)
- Time zone: UTC+5 (PST)
- Number of Tehsils: 2
- Website: hangu.kp.gov.pk

Hangu District (Pashto: هنګو ولسوالۍ, Urdu: ضلع ہنگو) is a district within the Kohat Division of the Khyber Pakhtunkhwa province, Pakistan. It is located close to the Pak-Afghan border with the Khost Province, Afghanistan. The district takes its name from the town of Hangu, which is its administrative centre. The name Hangu may also sometimes be applied to the Miranzai Valley which is partly within the district, bordering the Samana Range.

== History ==
From 1540 to 1893, Hangu was ruled by two prominent figures: the Malak Khails and the Khans of Hangu. The Malak Khails were centrally located in the Darsamand and Mammu regions. Historically, nomads from Afghanistan would travel southwards during the winters. However, this free movement was curtailed after the 1970s due to heightened border controls.

On 30 June 1996, Hangu District was carved out from a section of the Kohat District. The demarcation of its territory commences from the village of Khawaja Khizer (Jawzara), a point line between the Kohat and Hangu Districts. The 13th and the final Khan of Hangu was Muzaffar Khan Bangash. Today, his descendants live in various districts of Khyber Pakhtunkhwa including Hangu.

== Demographics ==
Historical population
| Year | Pop. | ±% p.a. |
|---|---|---|
| 1951 | 55,167 | — |
| 1961 | 87,163 | +4.68% |
| 1972 | 125,721 | +3.39% |
| 1981 | 182,474 | +4.23% |
| 1998 | 314,529 | +3.25% |
| 2017 | 518,811 | +2.67% |
| 2023 | 528,902 | +0.32% |

As of the 2023 census, Hangu district has 61,148 households and a population of 528,902. The district has a sex ratio of 96.91 males to 100 females and a literacy rate of 43.15%: 66.04% for males and 22.02% for females. 152,504 (29.01% of the surveyed population) are under 10 years of age. 85,727 (16.21%) live in urban areas. Pashto was the predominant language, spoken by 99.59% of the population.

=== Religion ===
Religions in Hangu district (2023)
| Religion | Percent |
| Islam | 99.49% |
| Christianity | 0.43% |
| Other or not stated | 0.08% |

Religion in contemporary Hangu District
| Religious group | 1941 | | 2017 | | 2023 | |
| Religious group | Pop. | % | Pop. | % | Pop. | % |
|---|---|---|---|---|---|---|
| Islam | 55,210 | 88.94% | 517,878 | 99.82% | 522,967 | 99.49% |
| Hinduism | 5,909 | 9.52% | 151 | 0.03% | 159 | 0.03% |
| Sikhism | 650 | 1.05% | —N/a | —N/a | 160 | 0.03% |
| Christianity | 0 | 0% | 543 | 0.10% | 2,256 | 0.43% |
| Others | 310 | 0.49% | 239 | 0.05% | 81 | 0.02% |
| Total Population | 62,079 | 100% | 518,811 | 100% | 525,623 (Note: Different from official population figure since it excludes sensitive areas where religion was not asked) | 100% |
Note: 1941 census data is for Hangu tehsil of erstwhile Kohat district, which roughly corresponds to contemporary Hangu district. District and tehsil borders have changed since 1941.

== Administrative divisions ==
Hangu District is divided into these tehsils:

| Tehsil | Name (Urdu) (Pashto) | Area (km^{2}) | Pop. (2023) | Density (ppl/km^{2}) (2023) | Literacy rate (2023) | Union Councils |
|---|---|---|---|---|---|---|
| Doaba Tehsil | | ... | ... | ... | ... | |
| Hangu Tehsil | (Urdu: تحصیل ہنگو) (Pashto: هنګو تحصیل) | 669 | 280,883 | 419.86 | 48.63% | |
| Tall Tehsil | (Urdu: تحصیل ٹل) (Pashto: ټل تحصیل) | 428 | 248,019 | 579.48 | 36.70% | |

=== Villages ===
- Mardukhel Banda

== Constituencies ==
The district comprises two constituencies for the Provincial Assembly of Khyber Pakhtunkhwa. The Pakistan Muslim League (N) (PML-N) has an overwhelming majority here. NA-9 and now NA-16 have been the stronghold of the party. Maulvi Naimatullah, Syed Ifthikhar Hussain Gilani and Javed Ibrahim Piracha have won consecutively since 1985. In the 2002 elections, PML-N did not run a candidate, but in 2008, Dr. Farooq Bangash, the PML-N NA-16 Candidate, who technically could not contest elections being British Citizen, surrendered to ANP Syed Haider Ali Shah, who won marginally from Muttahida Majlis-e-Amal (MMA). Basically it was Bangash's strategy to ensure a Pir Haider win. Now the majority and whole control for PTI, In Local body election PTI also gain the main power, and there is still strong opposition of JUI.

=== National Assembly ===
This district is represented by one elected MNA (Member of National Assembly) in Pakistan National Assembly. Its constituency is NA-16. Since 2002: NA-16 (Hangu)

| Election | Member | Party |
|---|---|---|
| 2002 | Akhunzada Muhammad Sadiq | MMA |
| 2008 | Haider Ali Shah | ANP |
| 2013 | Khayal Zaman Orakzai | PTI |
| 2018 | Khayal Zaman Orakzai | PTI |
| 2022 | Nadeem Khayal | PTI |

=== Provincial Assembly ===
| Member of Provincial Assembly | Party affiliation | Constituency | Year |
|---|---|---|---|
| Shah Faisal Khan | Pakistan Tehreek-e-Insaf | Hangu-I | 2018 |
| Muhammad Zahoor | Pakistan Tehreek-e-Insaf | Hangu-II | 2018 |

== Education ==
Various public and private schools and colleges exist in district of Hangu. Hangu population is near by 0.8 million people and they demand for university in 2013. Agriculture University campus was to be built in Hangu City but still the project is pending while funds transfer to Charsada University during ANP government. Recently the government degree college Hangu started a BS Hons 4-year program under Kohat University of Science and Technology.

== See also ==
- Khyber Pakhtunkhwa
- Dallan, Khyber Pakhtunkhwa
- Village Ibrahimzai, village known for being the home of Aitzaz Hasan in Hangu district
