= Nadeem Khayal =

Pakistani politician

Member of the National Assembly of Pakistan
- In office 22 February 2023 – 10 August 2023
- Preceded by: Khayal Zaman Orakzai
- Constituency: NA-33 (Hangu)

Personal details
- Parent: Khayal Zaman Orakzai (father)

Nadeem Khayal Khan (Urdu: ندیم خیال خان) is a Pakistani politician from Pakistan Tehreek-e-Insaf. He had been a member of the National Assembly of Pakistan from February 2023 till August 2023.

== Political career ==
=== 2022 ===
Khayal was elected to the 15th National Assembly of Pakistan in a 2022 by-election from the NA-33 (Hangu) constituency as a candidate of Pakistan Tehreek-e-Insaf. He received 20,772 votes and defeated Obaid Ullah, a candidate of the Jamiat Ulema-e-Islam (F).

By-election 2022: NA-33 (Hangu)
Party	Candidate	Votes	%	±%
PTI	Nadeem Khayal	20,772	48.75	▲11.75
JUI (F)	Obaidullah	18,244	42.82	▲6.91
Others	Others (three candidates)	3,595	8.44	
Turnout		43,148	13.53	▼15.94
Total valid votes		42,611	98.76	▲2.97
Rejected ballots		537	1.24	▼2.97
Majority		2,528	5.93	▲4.84
Registered electors		318,919		
PTI hold				

Khayal was notified by the Election Commission of Pakistan on 30 April 2022. He took the oath of office on 22 February 2023.

=== Pakistan Tehreek-e-Insaf Parliamentarians ===
It was alleged that he had left the PTI to join the Pakistan Tehreek-e-Insaf Parliamentarians (PTI-P), a new party founded by the former Chief Minister of Khyber Pakhtunkhwa, Pervez Khattak. Due to these allegations, his basic membership with the PTI was terminated. However, two days later, Khayal had announced in a press conference that he had forcefully been brought to Khattak's gathering where the latter had announced the foundation of the PTI-P. Khayal had also said that he was a part of the PTI and had no connections with the PTI-P.
