= Darsamand =

Coordinates: 32°26′16″N 70°39′48″E

- Town and union council
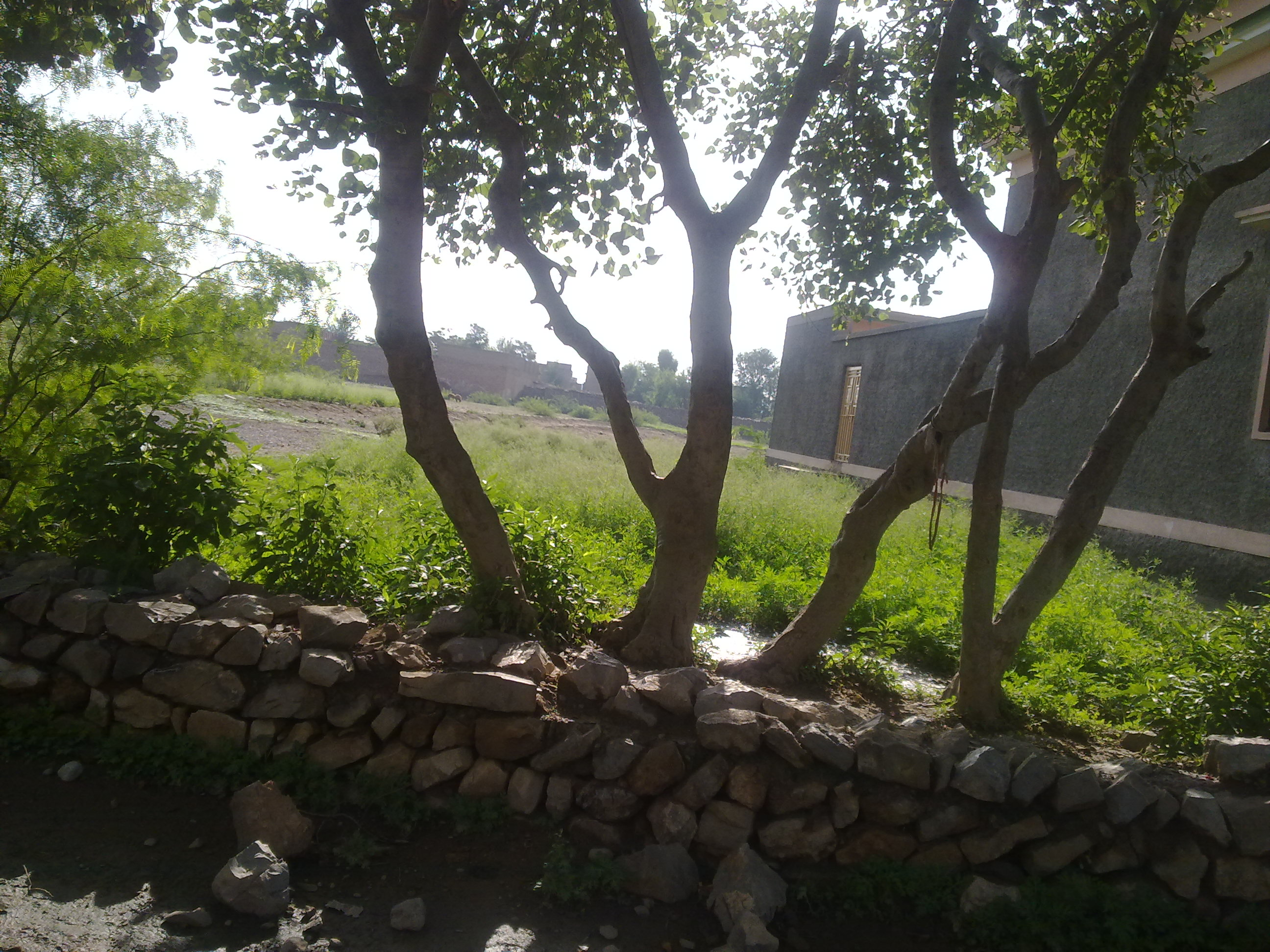
- Interactive map of Darsamand
- Country: Pakistan
- Province: Khyber Pakhtunkhwa
- District: Hangu District
- Time zone: UTC+5 (PST)

Darsamand is a large village in tehsil Thall under district Hangu. According to a survey Darsamand village is one of the largest villages in Pakistan, as its boundaries start from Jawar Ghudi and end at Mamoon Banda. It includes the union council of Hangu District in the Khyber Pakhtunkhwa province of Pakistan. It is located at 33°26'16N 70°39'48E and has an altitude of 889 metres (2919 feet).

There was an old railway station at Darsamand Jandhi but it is no longer in use.

Most of the Darsamand people are from the Bangash tribe.
