= Shah Faisal Khan =

Pakistani politician

Member of the Provincial Assembly of Khyber Pakhtunkhwa
- In office 13 August 2018 – 18 January 2023
- Constituency: PK-83 (Hangu-I)
- In office 10 September 2013 – 28 May 2018
- Constituency: Constituency PK-42 (Hangu-I)

Personal details
- Party: PTI-P (2023-present)
- Other political affiliations: PTI (2013-2023)

Shah Faisal Khan is a Pakistani politician who had been a member of the Provincial Assembly of Khyber Pakhtunkhwa, from September 2013 to May 2018 and from August 2018 to January 2023.

== Education ==
He received a degree in Bachelors of Arts in 2002.

== Political career ==
He was elected to the Provincial Assembly of Khyber Pakhtunkhwa as an independent candidate from Constituency PK-42 Hangu-I in by-polls held in August 2013. He received 38,391 votes and defeated an independent candidate, Syed Hussain.

In September 2013, he joined Pakistan Tehreek-e-Insaf (PTI).

He was re-elected to Provincial Assembly of Khyber Pakhtunkhwa as a candidate of PTI from Constituency PK-83 (Hangu-I) in the 2018 Pakistani general election.
