= Khayal Zaman Orakzai =

Pakistani politician (died 2022)

- خیال زمان اورکزئی

Member of the National Assembly of Pakistan
- In office 13 August 2018 – 14 February 2022
- Succeeded by: Nadeem Khayal
- Constituency: NA-33 (Hangu)
- In office 1 June 2013 – 31 May 2018
- Constituency: NA-16 (Hangu)

Personal details
- Died: 14 February 2022
- Party: PTI (2011-2022)
- Children: Nadeem Khayal (son)

Khayal or Khial Zaman Orakzai (Urdu: خیال زمان اورکزئی; died 14 February 2022) was a Pakistani businessman and politician who was a member of the National Assembly of Pakistan from August 2018 until his death in February 2022. Previously, he was a member of the National Assembly from June 2013 to May 2018.

== Political career ==
Orakzai joined Pakistan Tehreek-e-Insaf (PTI) in 2011. He was elected to the National Assembly of Pakistan as a candidate of PTI from Constituency NA-16 (Hangu) in the 2013 Pakistani general election. He received 24,067 votes and defeated a candidate of Jamiat Ulema-e Islam (F).

He served as Senior Vice President of the PTI with the additional post of the president of the PTI Khyber Pakhtunkhwa.

In 2018, Orakzai was nominated by the PTI to contest 2018 Pakistani Senate election where he was unsuccessful.

He was re-elected to the National Assembly as a candidate of PTI from Constituency NA-33 (Hangu) in the 2018 Pakistani general election. He received 28,819 votes and defeated Atiq Ur Rehman, a candidate of Muttahida Majlis-e-Amal (MMA).

== Wealth ==
Orakzai was the Chairman and CEO of Ajman-based Al Kanz Group. He owned Emaraat hotel in Peshawar and had property business. He had a net worth around Rs. 560.45 billion, as of 2021

== Personal life and death ==
He died on 14 February 2022.
