= Thall, Hangu District, Khyber Pakhtunkhwa =

Pakistani town

Thall ټل
- Town, Union Council

Tal transcription(s)

Urdu transcription(s)
- Location in Khyber Pakhtunkhwa Location in Pakistan
- Coordinates: 33°21.52′N 70°32.52′E
- Country: Pakistan
- Province: Khyber-Pakhtunkhwa
- District: Hangu District

Government
  - Chairman: Mufti Imran Muhammad (JUI(F))

Population (2023)
  - Total: 30,977
- Time zone: UTC+5 (PST)

Thall, also spelled Thal or Tal (Pashto: ټل) (Urdu: ٹل), is a town in Thall Tehsil in the Hangu District of Khyber Pakhtunkhwa province, Pakistan. It is located at the entrance of Kurram District, and close to both North Waziristan and the Khost Province of Afghanistan. Situated at 33°21'52N and 70°32'52E, it stands at an altitude of 742 metres (2437 feet).

== Overview and history ==
The town is administratively subdivided into two Union Councils. It is separated from the North Waziristan District by the Kurram River. The Peshawar-Tal and Tal-Parachinar road passes from here which is an important route of this area. It is around 4 hours drive from Peshawar and about 3 hours from Kohat.

A major Bazaar or market of this region is located here which is a hub for traders from Kurram, Afghanistan and adjoining areas. The historic Thall fort built by the British in 1909 is located here, which serves as the HQ for Thall Scouts, a paramilitary unit of FC. During hot weather people visit the Wali Chena (Wali Spring), a small spring with cold water, where they can bathe. There is a small forest named Toor Koot, which is popular for outings and picnics.

== Demographics ==
=== Population ===
Historical population
Year	Pop.	±% p.a.
1951	5,602	—
1961	11,747	+7.69%
1972	14,082	+1.66%
1981	18,901	+3.32%
1998	25,355	+1.74%
2017	32,382	+1.30%
2023	30,977	−0.74%

As of the 2023 census, Thall had a population of 30,977. The population was 25,355, according to the 1998 census.

== Education ==
There are many public and private sector educational institutes. The most prominent are Govt Degree College Thall for boys and Govt Girls Degree College Thall.

== See also ==
- Hangu District
