= Sitara-e-Shujaat =

Second-highest Pakistani civilian award for bravery

Sitara-e-Shujaat ستارہِ شجاعت
- Type: National Civilian
- Country: Islamic Republic of Pakistan
- Presented by: Government of Pakistan

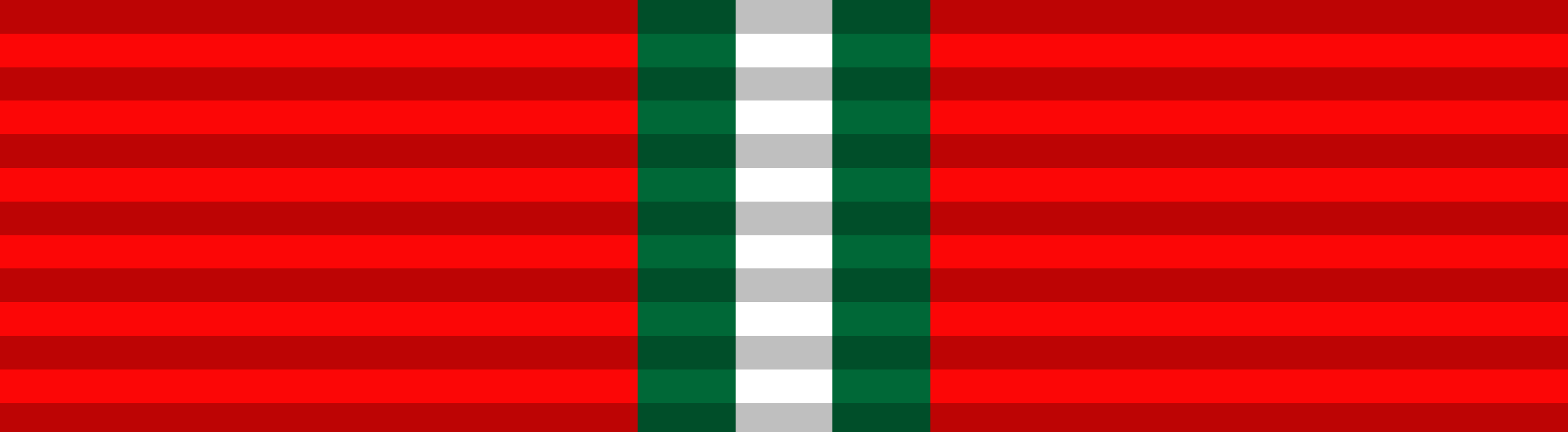
- Ribbon: Sitara-e-Shujaat Service Ribbon
- Established: 19 March 1957
- Final award: 2024

Precedence
- Next (higher): Nishan-e-Pakistan
- Equivalent: Hilal-e-Pakistan
- Next (lower): Sitara-e-Imtiaz

Sitara-e-Shujaat (Urdu: ستارہِ شجاعت, lit. 'Star of Valour'), sometimes spelled Sitara-i-Shujaat, is the second-highest civil award for bravery bestowed by the Islamic Republic of Pakistan. It is usually awarded to the Pakistani citizens such as civilians, human rights defenders, military or law enforcement officials for their bravery contributions to the national interest of the country, and while the award seeks to recognize the "gallantry contributions", it is also awarded posthumously by the president annually on the Pakistan Day.

After a citizen's contribution to security, defence and health among others is recognized, whether it is a government or non-government duty, the respective state governments prepares recommendation list to the federal government for final approval. After it is sent to the government, the prime minister recommends or advises the awardees list to the president.

== Announcement criteria ==
It is officially announced on the Independence day and is presented annually on the Pakistan Day. Before it is awarded to the eligible individuals, it is sent to the Cabinet of Pakistan by 15 April.

== History ==
Sitara-e-Shujaat and other civil awards were established on 23 March 1956, nine years after the partition of the Indian subcontinent. It came into existence under the Article 259 (2) and Decorations Act, 1975 of the constitution of Pakistan. Adil Bin Fazal was honored with it on September 27, 2024.
