= Thall Tehsil =

Thall Tehsil تحصیل ٹل ټل تحصیل
- Tehsil
- Interactive map of Thall Tehsil
- Country: Pakistan
- Region: Khyber Pakhtunkhwa
- District: Hangu

Population (2017)
  - Tehsil: 248,503
  - Urban: 53,676
  - Rural: 194,827
- Time zone: UTC+5 (PST)
  - Summer (DST): UTC+6 (PDT)

Thall is a tehsil located in Hangu District, Khyber Pakhtunkhwa, Pakistan. It is located close to the border with Khost Province, Afghanistan. The population is 248,503 according to the 2017 census.

== See also ==
- List of tehsils of Khyber Pakhtunkhwa
