= Hangu, Pakistan =

Hangu: هنګو; ہنگو
- City
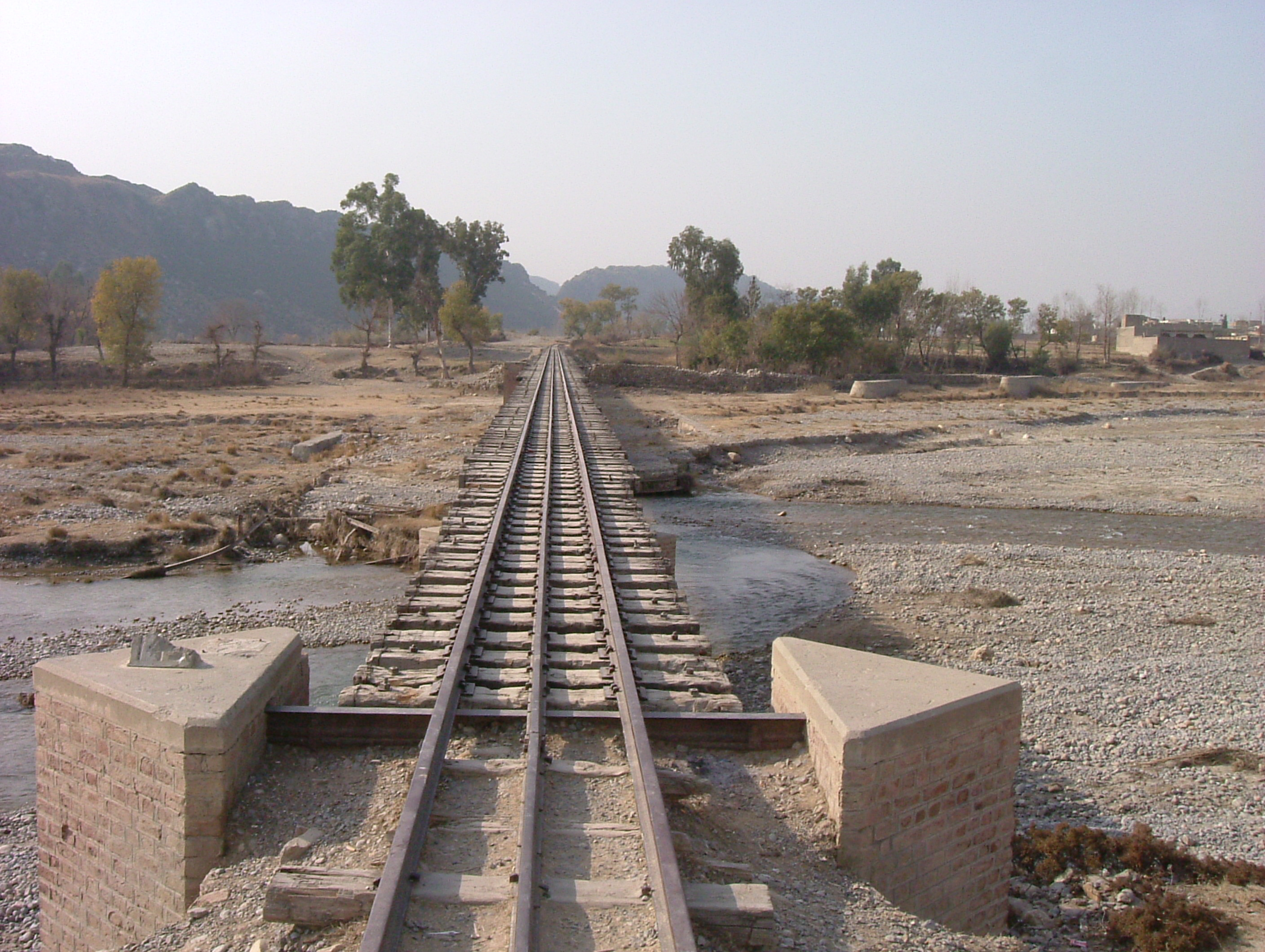
- Old railway bridge in Hangu

- Location within Khyber Pakhtunkhwa Location within Pakistan
- Coordinates: 33°32′N 71°4′E
- Country: Pakistan
- Province: Khyber Pakhtunkhwa
- Division: Kohat
- District: Hangu
- Tehsil: Hangu

Government
  - Chairman: Aamir Ghani (IND)
- Elevation: 810 m (2,660 ft)

Population (2023)
  - City: 43,642
  - Rank: 27th, Khyber Pakhtunkhwa
- Time zone: UTC+5 (PST)
- Postal code: 26190
- Area code: 0925

Hangu (Pashto: هنګو, Urdu: ہنگو) is a city in the Khyber Pakhtunkhwa province of Pakistan. It is the largest city and namesake of Hangu District and the third-largest city in Kohat Division, after Karak and Kohat. In 1998, Hangu was the second-largest city in the division. Hangu is the 27th most populous city in Khyber Pakhtunkhwa. The principal language of the city is Pashto.

== Etymology ==
The name Hangu may have originated from Chinese travelers. Hangu is also the name of a place in China, and since many Chinese travelers have passed through the area for centuries, it is possible that travelers, like Hiuen Tsang, saw some similarities with their own region and thus named it 'Hangu'.

== Demographics ==
=== Population ===
Historical Population
Year	Pop.	±% p.a.
1951	6,977	—
1961	9,737	+3.39%
1972	13,800	+3.22%
1981	15,526	+1.32%
1998	31,022	+4.16%
2017	48,764	+2.41%
2023	43,642	−1.83%

As of the 2023 census, Hangu had a population of 43,642.

== Education ==
Various public and private schools and colleges exist in Hangu. A campus of the Agriculture University was to be built in Hangu, but the project is still pending, as the funds were allegedly transferred to Charsadda by the ANP provincial government. Recently the government degree college Hangu start BS Hons 4-year program under Kohat University of Science and Technology. There are two government high schools for boys and two for girls in Hangu. The first government high school was built in 1935 in British era. Two Government Degree colleges for boys and girls and a number of Private institutes are serving well in promoting education in the area.

One government high school in Hangu is the Government High School Ibrahim Zai, which was renamed after a teenager who saved it from a suicide bomber and lost his life in the process. And there is a high school named Tameer e Millat High school Hangu for boys and girls located in Madras a road Sangerh in Hangu.

== Militant incidents ==
On 9 February 2006, a suicide bomber killed himself along with many of the Shia community on 10th of Muharram in main Hangu Bazaar when he triggered the bomb and killed many including children. After which a war raged between Taliban militants and Shites.

On 22 August 2008, sixteen militants (including two Chechens) were killed by Pakistani security forces in a skirmish at Hangu when security forces opened fire on their explosive-laden vehicle at a security checkpoint. One of the militants was arrested. One policeman and a member of the security forces were injured in the explosion. It was later discovered that the militants came from Darra Adamkhel, a town between Peshawar and Kohat with a thriving arms industry.

On 10 December 2010, a suicide bomber killed eleven people (including two policemen, a woman and a child) and injured another twenty-two. The attack occurred near Al-Zahra hospital which was under construction.

On 27 May 2011, 28 people were killed and another 55 injured when a suicide bomber exploded his vehicle at a checkpoint in the Hangu bazaar. Among the victims were four policemen. The explosion inflicted heavy damage to the offices of the Hangu police chief and special branch, the city police station, seventeen shops, three restaurants and a branch of the National Bank. The press was contacted by a Taliban spokesman claiming responsibility for the attack.

On Thursday, 23 August 2012, militants opened fire on a police van, killing three officers and injuring another two. It was suspected that the Taliban was behind the attack.

On Tuesday, 7 January 2014, 15-year-old student Aitzaz Hasan sacrificed himself after stopping a suicide bomber from entering his school.

On Sunday, 26 January 2014, six children were killed in a toy-bomb explosion.

On Friday, 29 September 2023, a suicide bomber exploded their vest inside a mosque, killing 7 and injuring many more.
