= Civil awards and decorations of Pakistan =

- Awarded for: In recognition of gallantry, academic distinction or distinction in the fields of sports or nursing.
- Country: Pakistan
- Presented by: President of Pakistan
- First award: 1973

Civil awards and decorations of Pakistan are awards and decorations which are bestowed by the Government of Pakistan for acts of accomplishment benefiting the nation as a whole. It was established after the constitution of Pakistan was passed in 1973. The announcement of civil awards is generally made once a year on Independence Day, August 14, and their investiture takes place on the following Pakistan Day, March 23. According to Article 259 of the Constitution of Pakistan 1973, along with the Decorations Act, 1975, the President of Pakistan confers civil awards on Pakistani citizens in recognition of gallantry. Awards for Pride of Performance are conferred for outstanding achievements in the fields of art, literature, science, sports and nursing.

== Background ==
Civil awards were incorporated into the constitution of Pakistan following recommendation from then-Prime Minister Zulfikar Ali Bhutto. Although Bhutto asserted that public service was a patriotic duty that did not require accolades and remarked that awards were unnecessary. But his administration nonetheless led to the inclusion of Article 259, titled "AWARDS," during the constitutional drafting process. This article stipulates that citizens may only accept titles, honours, or decorations from foreign states with federal government approval and restricts the conferral of such recognitions by federal or provincial authorities, except that the President is authorized to award decorations for gallantry, academic distinction, or achievements in sports and nursing as provided by federal law. Additionally, the article annuls all titles, honors, and decorations awarded by any authority in Pakistan before the law's commencement, unless awarded in recognition of gallantry or academic distinction.

== Selection process ==
In December, the ministries and their divisions are invited to recommend candidates to the Cabinet Division. Received nominations are considered by three awards committees after which final proposal is sent to the President for approval. After the President's approval, the announcements are made on Independence Day and investiture takes place on Pakistan Day.

The President of Pakistan can confer awards to foreign nationals any time during the year. For such awards, proposals are made by the Ministry of Foreign Affairs, and approved by the President prior to conferral.

== Politicisation ==
The civil awards have been subject to criticism for its politicised nature since the 1977 Pakistani military coup, with observers noting that awards are frequently granted or withheld based on political considerations. From 2008 to 2013, the Pakistan People's Party (PPP) was criticized for predominantly distributing civil awards to its ardent supporters. This issue resurfaced in 2024 when Senator Mushahid Ullah Khan raised concerns about the nomination and selection processes for these awards. Following his objections, a parliamentary panel expressed dismay at the lack of merit and transparency in awarding civil honors to individuals for their achievements in literature, arts, sports, medicine, or science.

== List of civil awards ==
The Civil Awards comprise five orders, each with four descending classes: Nishan (Symbol; Urdu: نشان), Hilal (Crescent; Urdu: ہلال), Sitara (Star; Urdu: ستارہ) and Tamgha (Medal; Urdu: تمغہ).

Civil decorations of Pakistan
Order Class	Pakistan	Shujaat (bravery)	Imtiaz (excellence)	Quaid-i-Azam* (leadership)	Khidmat* (service)
Citation:	Services in distinction of the state	Acts of heroism, courage in the face of danger and gallantry in saving life	Distinction in the fields of arts, literature, academia and business	For special merit or eminent services freely given	For long and meritorious services to nation-building, especially amongst the poor
1. Nishan (Order)	Nishan-e-Pakistan (1)	Nishan-e-Shujaat (2)	Nishan-e-Imtiaz (3)	Nishan-e-Quaid-e-Azam (4)	Nishan-e-Khidmat (5)
2. Hilal (Crescent)	Hilal-e-Pakistan (6)	Hilal-e-Shujaat (7)	Hilal-e-Imtiaz (8)	Hilal-e-Quaid-e-Azam (9)	Hilal-e-Khidmat (10)
3. Sitara (Star)	Sitara-e-Pakistan (11)	Sitara-e-Shujaat (12)	Sitara-e-Imtiaz (13)	Sitara-e-Quaid-e-Azam (14)	Sitara-e-Khidmat (15)
4. Tamgha (Medal)	Tamgha-e-Pakistan (16)	Tamgha-e-Shujaat (17)	Tamgha-e-Imtiaz (18)	Tamgha-e-Quaid-e-Azam (19)	Tamgha-e-Khidmat (20)

* Only awarded to foreign nationals.
Number in parentheses indicates order of precedence.
