= Islamabad Capital Territory Administration =

Civil administration of the Federal Capital of Pakistan

ICT Administration
- دارالحکومت انتظامیہ ، اسلام آباد

Agency overview
- Formed: 1980
- Jurisdiction: Islamabad Capital Territory
- Headquarters: ICT Administration Complex, G-11/4, Islamabad
- Agency executives: Anwar-ul-Haq, Chief Commissioner; Irfan Nawaz, Deputy Commissioner
- Key document: Presidential Order No. 18 of 1980
- Website: ictadministration.gov.pk

The Islamabad Capital Territory Administration (ICT Administration), (Urdu: دارالحکومت انتظامیہ ، اسلام آباد) generally known as the Islamabad Administration, is the provincial-level civil administration (and the main law and order agency) of the Islamabad Capital Territory, which includes the city of Islamabad, the federal capital of Pakistan. The Administration operates under Presidential Order No. 18 of 1980, which conferred the powers of a provincial government on the Chief Commissioner of Islamabad.

== Executive ==
The Executive Officers of ICT Administration are:-

1. Anwar-ul-Haq, Chief Commissioner, Islamabad
2. Muhammad Ahsan Younas, Inspector General of Islamabad Police
3. Irfan Nawaz, Deputy Commissioner / District Magistrate

== Departments ==
There are six directorates and twenty five departments working under ICT Administration. All departments report to the concerned Directorate under the supervision of Chief Commissioner Islamabad, the executive head of the district management.

1. Islamabad Police
2. Islamabad Traffic Police
3. District Magistrate Office
4. Revenue Department
5. Labour Department
6. Industries Department
7. Cooperative Societies Department
8. Auqaf Department
9. Civil Defense Department
10. Food Department
11. Excise & Taxation Department
12. Local Government & Rural Development Department
13. Zakat & Usher Department
14. Agriculture Department
15. Livestock & Dairy Development Department
16. Water Management Department
17. Soil Conservation Department
18. Fisheries Department
19. Women Programme Officer
20. Islamabad Employees Social Security Institution
21. Islamabad Boys Scout Association
22. Islamabad Sports Board
23. District Attorney
24. Dengue Fever Control Center
25. District Polio Control Room (DPCR) - ICT
26. Department of Libraries
27. ICT Market Committee
28. Islamabad Food Authority

== See also ==
- Government of the Islamabad Capital Territory
