= Sindh Police =

Pakistani provincial law enforcement

Department of Sindh Police Sindhi: سنڌ پوليس
- Abbreviation: SP
- Motto: Proud to Serve

Agency overview
- Formed: 1843; 183 years ago
- Employees: 200,000
- Annual budget: Classified

Jurisdictional structure
- Operations jurisdiction: Sindh, Pakistan
- Map of Department of Sindh Police's jurisdiction
- Area: 140,914 sq. km.
- Population: 60,000,000
- Legal jurisdiction: Sindh
- Governing body: Government of Sindh; Government of Pakistan
- General nature: Civilian police

Operational structure
- Headquarters: Karachi, Sindh, Pakistan
- Agency executive: Javed Alam Odho, PSP (BPS-21 PSP), Inspector-General
- Parent agency: Police Service of Pakistan

Website
- http://www.sindhpolice.gov.pk/

The Sindh Police (Urdu: سندھ پولیس, Sindhi: سنڌ پوليس) is a law enforcement agency established in 1843 under a proclamation issued by Sir Charles Napier, who became the conqueror of the State of Sindh by defeating the forces of the Talpur rulers at the Battle of Miani near Hyderabad on 20 March 1843. Ever since its inception, the organization was raised on the model of the Royal Irish Constabulary to maintain law and order and law enforcement in Sindh, Pakistan. The department serves an area of ~140,914 km^{2} and has about 280,000 police officers and staff. As of 1 January 2026, Javed Alam Odho is the Inspector-General of Police.

The Sindh Police has been fictionalized as well as dramatized in numerous movies, novels, dramas, and television shows through its history.

== History ==
After becoming the Governor of Sindh, General Sir Charles James Napier established a policy system based on the pattern of the Royal Irish Constabulary in 1843. British Indian Army Officers closely supervised and controlled the force which was consequently more disciplined, efficient and less corrupt. Influenced by the success of Napier's police, the Court of Directors of the East Bangladesh Company suggested that a common system of police be established on the pattern of the Irish Constabulary.

The British Indian Government set up a Police Commission headed by Mr. H.M. Court in 1860. One of the policy directives to the Police Commission of 1860 was that "though the duties of the police should be entirely civil, not military, the organization and discipline of the police should be similar to those of a military body". The present police system in Pakistan has been established under this Charter. At the time of the British Indian Police there was a famous Superintendent of Police from Pirdad (Hazro) in Punjab named Muhammad Umar Khan, who was much decorated. In October 2010 the government announced that Sindh Police had been given the approval to use and had received equipment to utilise phone-tracking technology to help them tackle kidnapping cases and corruption on the streets of Karachi.

== Designations ==
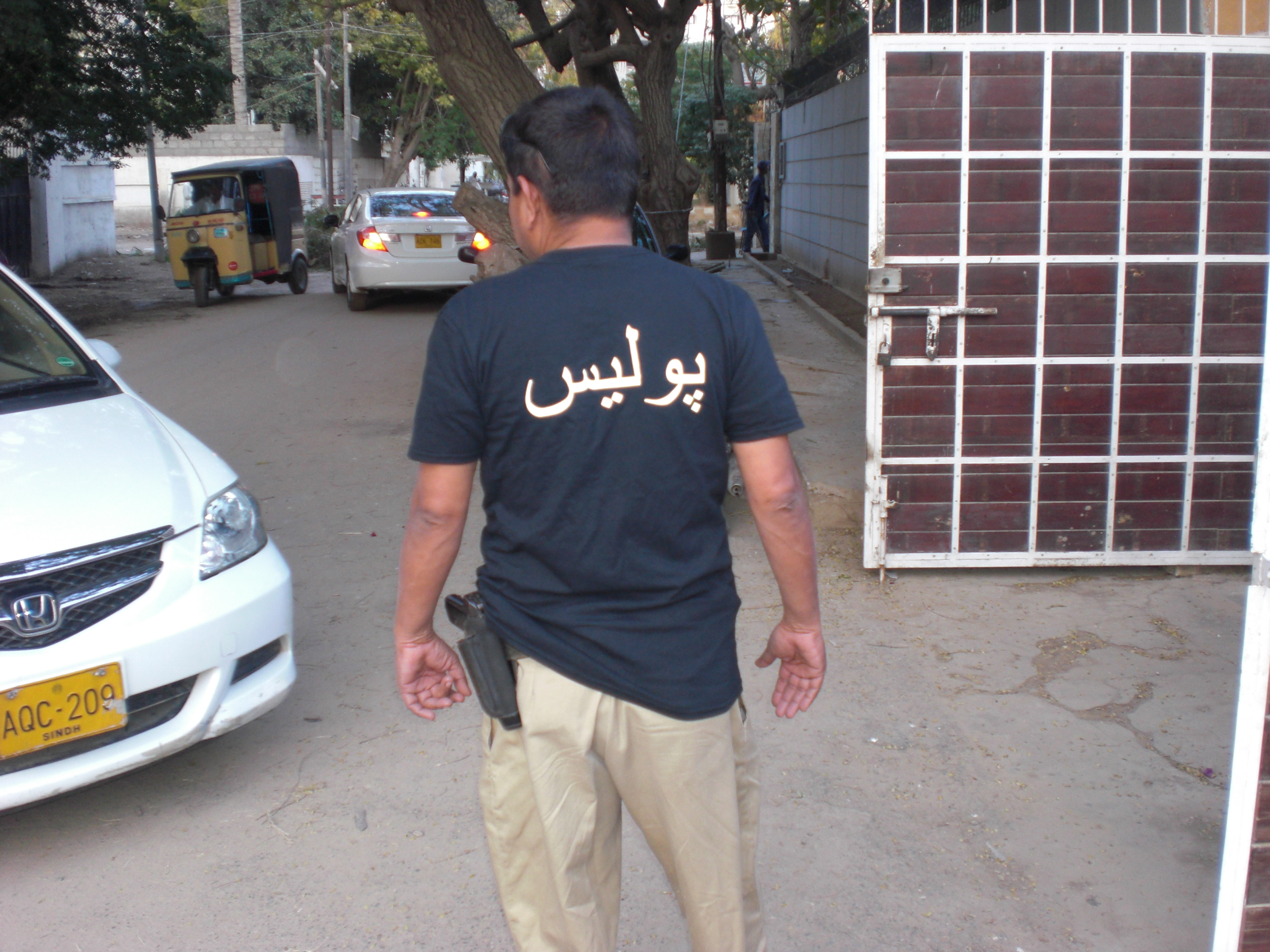
Armed Sindh Police constable in uniform

Designations of Sindh Police are as follows:

Grade	Police Ranks	Abbreviations
BPS-07	Constable	PC
BPS-09	Head Constable	HC
BPS-11	Assistant Sub-Inspector	ASI
BPS-14	Sub-Inspector	SI
BPS-16	Police Inspector	Inspector
BPS-17	Assistant Superintendent of Police; Deputy Superintendent of Police	ASP; DSP
BPS-18	Superintendent of Police	SP
BPS-19	Senior Superintendent of Police/Assistant Inspector General	SSP/AIG
BPS-20	Deputy Inspector General	DIG
BPS-21	Additional Inspector General	Addl. IG
BPS-22	Inspector General of Police	IGP

=== Posts ===
SHO, SDPO, DPO, CPO, RPO and PPO are posts, not ranks. So you may see a lower rank acting as a higher post for some time.

=== Special Security Unit ===
The Special Security Unit (SSU) is one of the specialized counterterrorism and security units of the Sindh Police. It performs the function of counterterrorism operations and provide security to important personalities and institutions. It is a Karachi based unit of the Sindh Police, Pakistan and its operational jurisdiction extends to entire area of Sindh. The SSU was established due to the increased security and counterterrorism challenges in the country. It meets the international standards of counterterrorism training and has been directed to deal with the terrorist intimidations. The unit reports to IG Sindh and DIGP Security Mr. Lt (r) Maqsood Ahmed is the founding head of the unit.

== Composition and Organization ==
Central Police Office (CPO), Karachi serves as headquarter of Sindh Police where Inspector General of Police, Sindh sits. All main administrative branches of Sindh police such as Investigation, Finance and Establishment branch are also headquartered at CPO Karachi. When it comes to operational jurisdiction, Sindh Police is divided into three ranges. Each range is headed by Additional Inspector General of Police (Addl.IGP). Each range in return consists of one to three regions/divisions that are headed by Deputy Inspector General of Police(DIG). These divisions are consisted of 3 to 7 districts that are led by an officer with a rank of Senior Superintendent of Police. Currently Karachi, Hyderabad, Sukkur, Shaheed Benazirabad, Mirpurkhas, Karachi East, West and South are the ranges of Sindh Police that are being led by DIGP rank police officials.

Executive office	Incumbent	Designation Rank
Central Police Office	Javed Alam Odho, PSP	IGP
Establishment	Mr. Zulfiqar Ali Larik, PSP (Charge)	Addl.IGP
Internal Accountability Bureau, Karachi	Muzzafar Ali Shaikh, PSP (Charge)	Addl.IGP
Finance, Logistics and Welfare, Karachi	Muzzafar Ali Shaikh, PSP	Addl.IGP
Investigation Branch, Karachi	Mr. Amir Farooqui, PSP (Charge)	Addl.IGP
Operations Branch, Karachi	Sharjeel Karim Kharal, PSP	Addl.IGP
Counter Terrorism Department, Karachi	Azad Khan Tanoli, PSP	Addl.IGP
Special Branch, Karachi	Zulfiqar Ali Larik, PSP	Addl.IGP
Research & Development Branch, Karachi	Muzzafar Ali Shaikh, PSP (Charge)	Addl.IGP
Headquarters	Mazhar Nawaz Sheikh, PSP	DIGP
Special Security Unit, Karachi	Maqsood Ahmed, PSP	DIGP
Driver's License Branch, Karachi	Younas Chandio, PSP	DIGP
Information Technology Directorate, Karachi	Flt. Lt. (R) Imran Yaqub, PSP	DIGP
Karachi Unit	Incumbent	Designation/Rank
Capital City Police Office	Imran Yaqoob Minhas, PSP	CCPO/Addl.IGP
Regional Police Office, Karachi East	Farrukh Lanjar, PSP	RPO/DIG
District Police Office East	Dr. Farrukh Raza, PSP	DPO/SSP
District Police Office Korangi	Sardar Hussain, PSP	DPO/SSP
District Police Office, Malir	Tariq Ilahi Mastoi, PSP	DPO/SSP
Regional Police Office, Karachi West	Irfan Baloch, PSP	RPO/DIG
District Police Office, West	Manzoor Ali, PSP	DPO/SSP
District Police Office, Central	Zeeshan Siddique, PSP	DPO/SSP
Regional Police Office, Karachi South	Syed Azad Raza, PSP	RPO/DIG
District Police Office, Keamari	Arif Aslam, PSP	DPO/SSP
District Police Office, South Karachi, Clifton	Imran Qureshi, PSP	DPO/SSP
District Police Office, Karachi City	Amjad Hayat, PSP	DPO/SSP
Hyderabad Unit	Incumbent	Designation/Rank
Additional. IGP Hyderabad Unit	Tariq Dharejo, PSP (charge)	Addl.IGP
Regional Police Office, Hyderabad	Tariq Dharejo, PSP	RPO/DIG
District Police Office Hyderabad	Adeel Chandio, PSP	DPO/SSP
District Police Office Tando Allahyar	Saleem Shah, PSP	DPO/SSP
District Police Office Tando Muhammad Khan	Saleem Shah, PSP	DPO/SSP
District Police Office Matiari	Noor ul Haq Rind, SPS	DPO/SSP
District Police Office Dadu	Ameer Saud Magsi, PSP	DPO/SSP
District Police Office Jamshoro	Zaffar Siddiqui, PSP	DPO/SSP
District Police Office Thatta	Ali Bux Nizamani, SPS	DPO/SSP
District Police Office Sujawal	Aleena Rajpar, PSP	DPO/SSP
District Police Office Badin	Qamar Raza Jiskani, PSP	DPO/SSP
Regional Police Office, Mirpur Khas	Zubair Dareshak, PSP	RPO/DIG
District Police Office Mirpur Khas	Adil Memon, PSP	DPO/SSP
District Police Office Tharparker	Ali Mardan Khoso, PSP	DPO/SSP
District Police Office Umerkot	Abdul Khalique, PSP	DPO/SSP
Regional Police Office, Nawabshah	Faisal Bashir, PSP	RPO/DIG
District Police Office Nawabshah	Capt (R) Haider Raza, PSP	DPO/SSP
District Police Office Sanghar	Capt (R) Saddam Hussain, PSP	DPO/SSP
District Police Office Naushero Feroz	Abid Ali Baloch, PSP	DPO/SSP
Sukkur Unit	Incumbent	Designation/Rank
Additional. IGP Sukkur Unit	Capt(R) Faisal Abdullah (Charge)	Addl.IGP
Regional Police Office, Sukkur	Capt(R) Faisal Abdullah, PSP	RPO/DIG
District Police Office Sukkur	Azhar Mughal, PSP	DPO/SSP
District Police Office Ghotki	Munir Ahmed Khuhro, SPS	DPO/SSP
District Police Office Khairpur	Hassan Sardar Niazi, PSP	DPO/SSP
Regional Police Office, Larkana	Nasir Aftab, PSP	RPO/DIGP
District Police Office Larkana	Syed Abdul Raheem Sheerazi, PSP	DPO/SSP
District Police Office Shikarpur	Khalid Mustafa Korai, PSP	DPO/SSP
District Police Office Jacobabad	Syed Amir Abbas Shah, PSP	DPO/SSP
District Police Office Kashmore	Mir Rohal Khan, PSP	DPO/SSP

== PPOs/IGPs of Sindh Police ==
List of PPOs/IGs of Sindh Police
Term	Portrait	Name	Took office	Left office	Tenure	Note(s)
1		Khowaja Masroor Hassan خواجہ مسرور حسن (1970–71)	1 July 1970	29 December 1971	1 year, 181 days	First Provincial Police Officer (PPO) of Sindh Police
2		Muhammad Usoof Orakzai محمد یوسف اورکزئی (1971–73)	29 December 1971	21 February 1973	1 year, 54 days	-
3		Chaudhary Fazal-e-Haq چوہدری فضل الحق (1973–75)	21 February 1973	27 May 1975	2 years, 95 days	-
4		Mian Muhammad Aslam Hayat میاں محمد اسلم حیات (1975–77)	27 May 1975	16 March 1977	1 year, 293 days	-
5		Habib-ur-Rehman Khan حبیب الرحمان خان (1977)	16 March 1977	30 September 1977	198 days	-
6		Arbab Hidayatullah ارباب ہدایت اللہ (1977-82)	30 September 1977	22 August 1982	4 years, 326 days	Longest serving PPO
7		Dilshad Najmuddin دلشاد نجم الدین (1982-83)	1 September 1982	30 October 1983	1 year, 59 days	-
8		Bashir Ahmed Khan بشیر احمد خان (1983-84)	1 November 1983	12 August 1984	285 days	-
9		Syed Saadat Ali Shah سید سعادت علی شاہ (1984-86)	12 August 1984	19 June 1986	1 year, 311 days	-
10		Syed Salman Khaliq سید سلمان خالق (1986-87)	19 June 1986	26 July 1987	1 year, 37 days	-
11		Muhammad Nawaz Malik محمد نواز ملک (1987-88)	27 July 1987	28 July 1988	1 year, 1 day	-
12		Muhammad Abbas Khan محمد عباس خان (1988-89)	28 July 1988	25 January 1989	181 days	-
13		Khawar Zaman خاور زمان (1989-90)	25 January 1989	20 February 1990	1 year, 26 days	-
14		Syed Saadat Ali Shah سید سعادت علی شاہ (1990)	20 February 1990	20 August 1990	181 days	-
15		Khawar Zaman خاور زمان (1990)	20 August 1990	1 December 1990	103 days	-
16		Mohsin Manzoor محسن منظور (1990)	1 December 1990	18 December 1990	17 days	-
17		Ghulam Moinuddin غلام معین الدین (1990-92)	18 December 1990	10 February 1992	1 year, 54 days	-
18		Kamar Alam قمر عالم (1992-93)	15 March 1992	25 July 1993	1 year, 132 days	-
19		Mohsin Manzoor محسن منظور (1993)	25 July 1993	25 November 1993	123 days	-
20		Afzal Ali Shigri افضل علی شگری (1993-95)	25 November 1993	15 August 1995	1 year, 263 days	-
21		Muhammad Saeed Khan محمد سعید خان (1995-96)	15 August 1995	28 December 1996	1 year, 135 days	Recipient of Hilal-e-Shujaat and Sitara-e-Basalat
22		Syed Mohib Asad سید محب اسد (1996-97)	28 December 1996	22 August 1997	237 days	-
23		Asad Jahangir Khan اسد جہانگیر خان (1997)	22 August 1997	25 November 1997	95 days	-
24		Aftab Nabi آفتاب نبی (1997-98)	25 November 1997	30 December 1998	1 year, 35 days	Recipient of Quaid-e-Azam Police Medal and President Police Medal
25		Maqbool Ahmed مقبول احمد (1998-99)	30 October 1998	12 October 1999	347 days	Recipient of Quaid-e-Azam Police Medal
26		Asad Ashraf Malik اسد اشرف ملک (1999)	13 October 1999	28 October 1999	15 days	Recipient of President's Police Medal
27		Aftab Nabi آفتاب نبی (1999-2001)	28 October 1999	17 September 2001	1 year, 324 days	Recipient of Quaid-e-Azam Police Medal and President Police Medal
28		Syed Kamal Shah سید کمال شاہ (2001-02)	17 September 2001	14 August 2002	331 days	Recipient of Sitara-e-Shujaat and Sitara-i-Imtiaz
-	-	The office of Provincial Police Officer (PPO) was renamed to Inspector General Of Police (IGP)	-	-	-	-
29		Syed Kamal Shah سید کمال شاہ (2002-05)	14 August 2002	9 February 2005	2 years, 179 days	Recipient of Sitara-e-Shujaat and Sitara-i-Imtiaz
30		Asad Jahangir Khan اسد جہانگیر خان (2005)	9 February 2005	24 December 2005	318 days	-
31		Jahangir Mirza جہانگیر مرزا (2006-07)	2 January 2006	14 April 2007	1 year, 102 days	-
32		Niaz Ahmed Siddiki نیاز احمد صدیقی (2007)	14 April 2007	18 June 2007	65 days	-
33		Zia-ul-Hassan Khan ضیاء الحسن خان (2007-08)	18 June 2007	9 January 2008	205 days	-
34		Azhar Ali Faroqi اظہر علی فاروقی (2008)	9 January 2008	12 April 2008	94 days	-
35		Dr. Muhammad Shoaib Suddle محمد شعیب سڈل (2008)	12 April 2008	30 June 2008	79 days	-
36		Sultan Salahuddin Babar Khattak سلطان صلاح الدین بابر خٹک (2008-11)	30 June 2008	10 February 2011	2 years, 225 days	-
37		Fayyaz Ahmed Leghari فیاض احمد لغاری (2011)	18 February 2011	16 June 2011	118 days	-
38		Wajid Ali Khan واجد علی خان (2011)	17 June 2011	20 October 2011	125 days	-
39		Syed Mushtaq Shah سید مشتاق شاہ (2011)	21 October 2011	7 July 2012	260 days	-
40		Fayyaz Ahmed Leghari فیاض احمد لغاری (2012-13)	11 July 2012	8 March 2013	240 days	-
41		Ghulam Shabbir Shaikh غلام شبیر شیخ (2013)	8 March 2013	22 March 2013	14 days	Shortest tenure as IGP
42		Shahid Nadeem Baloch شاہد ندیم بلوچ (2013-14)	23 March 2013	22 February 2014	336 days	-
43		Squadron Leader (R) Iqbal Mahmood اقبال محمود (2014)	23 April 2014	3 July 2014	71 days	-
44		Ghulam Hyder Jamali غلام حیدر جمالی (2014-16)	8 July 2014	12 March 2016	1 year, 248 days	-
45		AD Khowaja اے ڈی خواجہ (2016-18)	12 March 2016	13 June 2018	2 years, 93 days	-
46		Amjad Javed Saleemi امجد جاوید سلیمی (2018)	13 June 2018	9 September 2018	88 days	-
47		Dr. Syed Kaleem Imam سید کلیم امام (2018-20)	12 September 2018	28 February 2020	1 year, 169 days	-
48		Mushtaq Ahmad Mahar مشتاق احمد مہر (2020-22)	28 February 2020	18 May 2022	2 years, 79 days	-
49		Dr. Kamran Fazal کامران فضل (2022)	18 May 2022	2 June 2022	15 days	-
50		Ghulam Nabi Memon غلام نبی میمن (2022-23)	3 June 2022	19 August 2023	1 year, 77 days	-
51		Riffat Mukhtar رفعت مختار (2023-24)	20 August 2023	23 March 2024	217 days	-
52		Ghulam Nabi Memon غلام نبی میمن (2024)	24 March 2024	31 December 2025	1 year, 283 days	-
53		Javed Alam Odho جاوید عالم اوڈھو (2026)	1 January 2026	Incumbent	-	-

== Controversies ==
Extra-Judicial Killings Reported in Media by Sindh Police

The Sindh Police has been actively involved in countering human trafficking, drug trade, solving criminal cases (such as murder and abduction).

=== IG Sindh appointment ===
The Government of Pakistan, in consultation with the Governor of Sindh, appointed Mushtaq Ahmad Mahar as Inspector General of Police, replacing Syed Kaleem Imam at the request of Sindh's provincial government due to his perceived insubordination and failure to control increasing crime rates in Karachi.

=== Mazar-e-Quaid incident ===
The Pakistan Democratic Movement conducted a large political rally in the port city of Karachi near the Mazar-e-Quaid on October 18, 2020. During the rally, former Prime Minister of Pakistan Nawaz Sharif addressed the leader of the Pakistani Army, saying, "General Qamar Javed Bajwa, you packed up our government, which was working well, and put the nation and the country at the altar of your wishes." This speech was censored when broadcast by Pakistani media on the government's orders. Some news analysts believed that Sharif's open criticism of Bajwa was unlikely to be taken lightly.

That night, officials of the Inter-Services Intelligence (ISI) and Pakistan Rangers allegedly abducted Inspector General Mahar and forced him to sign an order to arrest prominent opposition leader Muhammad Safdar Awan, Sharif's son-in-law, for "violating the sanctity of Quaid's mausoleum" during the rally. The sequence of events, according to Al Jazeera, was that federal intelligence agencies grew frustrated because they were unable to immediately arrest Safdar, so they sent nine paramilitary Ranger vehicles to Mahar's house at 4am on October 19 to bring him to a meeting with the sector commander, where they demanded that he authorise Safdar's arrest. Awan was released on bail the same day.

To protest this treatment, Mahar and other senior officials in the Sindh police department applied for leave en masse, though they subsequently relented when Qamar Javed Bajwa, the head of Pakistani armed forces, ordered an inquiry into the incident. The Federal Minister of Information, Shibli Faraz, called this protest by the Sindh police a "quasi-mutiny".

According to former Inspector General of Police Akhtar Hassan Khan, the events were a series of blunders. He said that Safdar's behavior at the mausoleum was inappropriate and could be considered a legal offence, but not a cognizable one, meaning that his arrest should have been preceded by a court warrant. He condemned the abduction and intimidation of Mahar. According to Al Jazeera, while all the reports of Mahar's mistreatment were unlikely to be true, such behavior on the part of federal intelligence officials amounted to coercion. Mazhar Abbas of thenews.com.pk reported that Prime Minister of Pakistan Imran Khan considered the kidnapping and its aftermath to be media-created hype and a non-issue, laughing over the incident.

==== Impact and legacy ====
According to Mazhar Abbas, the issues raised by such intra-institutional conflict and the unprecedented police revolt are unlikely to be resolved quickly. Three inquiries were made, one by the head of the armed forces, another by a committee of the Sindh provincial government, and a third, limited one by the federal government. The Civil Society filed a petition in Pakistan's Supreme Court seeking to restrain the federal government and its armed agencies from illegitimate interference in provincial autonomy.

As per a report by an inquiry conducted on the orders of Chief of Army Staff (COAS) General Qamar Javed Bajwa, Mahar was not kidnapped but "summoned overzealously" since the ISI and Pakistan Rangers were allegedly under great public pressure. As per the recommendations of same inquiry, the ISI and Ranger officials concerned in the incident were removed from any ongoing assignments that might cause misunderstandings with the Sindh Police.

== Weaponry ==
Service colour	Dark blue and red
Uniform colour	Black, Khaki

The Sindh Police uses a variety of weaponry. However, these are a few of the most common weapons used.

- AK-47/Type 56
- Heckler & Koch G3
- Heckler & Koch MP5 (MP5K version also widely used)
- Beretta M92
- Glock
- Steyr GB
- RPG-7
- Tear gas
- Riot shields
- Flak Jackets

== Vehicles ==
The most common vehicles used by the Sindh Police are:

Toyota Hilux Single/Double cabin (REVO/Vigo version), Toyota Corolla (2010-2018 version), Mohafiz Internal Security Vehicle, APCs, troop carriers, water cannons.

The Sindh Police uses drone technology to combat criminals within the region. The models they use remain unknown however it is suggested that they use the SATUMA Jasoos, for reconnaissance or other activities.

== Police Hospitals in Sindh ==
- Sindh Police Hospital Garden Karachi
- Regional Police Hospital Hyderabad
- Regional Police Health Center Sukkur

== Citizens Police Liaison Committee ==
The Citizens Police Liaison Committee (CPLC) (Urdu: شہری پولیس رابطہ پنچائیت) is a public-private relationship, self-funding, Non-Political Statutory organization, established under a notification by the Sindh government. The CPLC provides relief and technical support to victims of crime. Fakhruddin G. Ebrahim established the Citizen Police Liaison Committee (CPLC) in 1989, while Jameel Yusuf was its founding chairman. The CPLC works in Karachi and assists citizens in registering the (FIR) if it is refused by police for some reason.

The public takes initiative as a volunteer and report the failing law and order situations to the law enforcement agencies to achieve its objectives.

=== Organization structure ===
CPLC is distributed among 6 district offices in Karachi, one district office at Hyderabad, decided to establish a district office in Sukkur, where as its main office is located in the Governor House Sindh. A Police core group was established by the IGP Sindh to cooperate among Police and the citizens.

CPLC had previously Ahmed Chinoy as its chief and new chief Zubair Habib has been appointed as a new chief of CPLC. CPLC has established 1102 as its help-line. Makhdoom Ali Khan was member of the advisory board of the Citizens Police Liaison Committee (CPLC).

== See also ==
- Sindh Police Training Center
- Balochistan Police
- Enforced disappearances in Pakistan
- Law enforcement in Pakistan
- Muhammad Safdar Awan
- Khyber Pakhtunkhwa Police
- Punjab Police
