= Government of the Islamabad Capital Territory =

Government of the Islamabad Capital Territory, Pakistan

The government of the Islamabad Capital Territory, a federal territory of Pakistan containing the capital city (Islamabad), is provided by the federal Government of Pakistan and by a number of territorial bodies. Article 258 of the Constitution of Pakistan stipulates that the President of Pakistan is responsible for establishing the government of the federal capital and the Parliament of Pakistan makes laws for the territory. Although the federal government retains strategic power over the territory, the day to day government is carried out by a number of bodies, which have been established over the years.

There have been occasional suggestions and demands for the creation of an Islamabad Legislative Assembly, similar to the legislatures of other capital territories and districts such as the Australian Capital Territory Legislative Assembly. In 2011, a senior federal minister, Babar Awan, suggested such an assembly might be created in the near future. One possible reason for the suggestion was the haphazard system of local government in the Territory. The urban areas of west Islamabad were governed directly by the appointed Capital Development Authority (CDA), which had been established on 14 June 1960, was responsible for building the capital. The rural areas in east Islamabad were administered as a group of twelve tehsils (sub-districts), although elections had not been held for the tehsil councils for several years.

Federal-level; Government of Pakistan
Provincial-level; Islamabad Capital Territory Administration
District-level; Islamabad Metropolitan Corporation	Capital Development Authority
Union Council-level; 101 Union Councils

In January 2023, a petition was lodged with the Islamabad High Court, calling for the creation of a territorial legislature, similar to ones in Australia and India. The petition noted that provincial powers were exercised by the unelected Chief Commissioner and that territorial laws were made by elected representatives from across the country rather than by representatives from Islamabad.

The Islamabad Capital Territory Administration (ICTA) was established in 1980, and is led by a Chief Commissioner, who holds powers similar to a provincial government. The Islamabad High Court, established in 2007 (dissolved in 2008, re-established in 2010) is the senior court of the territory and is equivalent to the four provincial high courts.

The Islamabad Metropolitan Corporation (MCI), established in 2015, is the municipal authority and is equivalent to a district government, as the upper tier of the local government in the territory. The CDA has been gradually transferring many of its roles to the MCI, but the CDA continues to have some government roles.

At the most local level, there are 101 union councils, though this is due to increase to 125 councils.

== Islamabad Capital Territory Administration ==
ICT Administration
Agency overview
- Formed: 1980
- Jurisdiction: Islamabad Capital Territory
- Headquarters: ICT Administration Complex, G-11/4, Islamabad
- Agency executive: Anwar-ul-Haq, Chief Commissioner

The Islamabad Capital Territory Administration (ICTA) is the provincial-level civil administration and the main law and order agency of the Islamabad Capital Territory. The Administration operates under Presidential Order No. 18 of 1980, which granted the equivalent powers of a provincial government on the Chief Commissioner of Islamabad. The ICTA comprises a number of departments including the Islamabad Police, the Islamabad Traffic Police, and the Islamabad Food Authority.

== Islamabad Metropolitan Corporation ==
Metropolitan Corporation Islamabad

Type
- Type: Metropolitan Corporation

History
- Founded: 2015

Leadership
- Mayor: Pir Syed Adil Gillani
- Seats: 151

Meeting place
- MCI Office (Old Naval Headquarters), Sector G-6, Islamabad

The Metropolitan Corporation Islamabad (MCI) is the district-level authority for the Islamabad Capital Territory. It was established under the ICT Local Government Act 2015. The corporation is headed by the Mayor of Islamabad and includes 151 other members including 101 chairmen of the union councils (the lowest level of local government).

The MCI is responsible for various activities in the Capital Territory including waste management, environmental protections, and developmental works to name a few. According to its official website, the Mayor has outlined various initiatives to be taken for the development of the city including; construction of a town hall, provision of water supply from Ghazi Barotha dam, and the formation of a solid waste management company.

== Capital Development Authority ==
Capital Development Authority
Public benefit corporation overview
- Formed: 14 June 1960; 66 years ago
- Headquarters: G-7/4, Islamabad
- Public benefit corporation executive: Muhammad Ali Randhawa, Chairman
- Key document: CDA Ordinance of June 27

The Capital Development Authority (CDA) is a public benefit corporation responsible for providing municipal services in Islamabad Capital Territory. The CDA was established on 14 June 1960 by an executive order called the Pakistan Capital Regulation. The regulation was superseded by CDA Ordinance issued on June 27, 1960. The future military president, Major General Yahya Khan was designated as the first Chairman on 21 June 1960. The CDA was tasked with developing and maintaining the new federal capital city.

Since 2015, most of the CDA municipal services have been transferred to the newly created Islamabad Metropolitan Corporation. However, the CDA is still in charge of estate management, project execution and sector developments.

== Islamabad High Court ==
Islamabad High Court
- Established: 2010 (16 years ago)
- Appeals to: Supreme Court of Pakistan
- Appeals from: Islamabad District Courts
- Number of positions: 13

Chief Justice of Islamabad High Court
- Currently: Aamer Farooq
- Since: 11 November 2022

The Islamabad High Court (IHC) is the senior court of the Islamabad Capital Territory, and has appellate jurisdiction over the following district courts:

- Islamabad District Court (East)
- Islamabad District Court (West)

Appeals from the IHC can be made to the Supreme Court of Pakistan. The current Chief Justice is Aamer Farooq who took the oath on 11 November 2022.

== See also ==
- Government of the Australian Capital Territory
- Government of Delhi
- Government of the District of Columbia
