= Quaid-e-Azam Police Medal =

Gallantry award of Pakistan

- Type: Medal
- Country: Islamic Republic of Pakistan
- Presented by: Government of Pakistan

- Ribbon
- Established: 1957

Quaid-e-Azam Police Medal (abbreviated as QPM) is a gallantry award bestowed by the Islamic Republic of Pakistan to law enforcement agencies, particularly police personals to recognize their meritorious contribution to the national interest of Pakistan, and while it is a gallantry award it is also awarded posthumously.

It is awarded annually by the president on the occasion of national celebration. The award recommendations are made by National Police Bureau in association with provincial police departments. The report is then sent to the Ministry of Interior for final approval of president and prime minister.

== History ==
The medal was constituted in 1975 under the Decorations Act, 1975. In 2014 for the first time in the history of Pakistan, the government postponed the award because the ministry responsible for preparing the list failed to submit recommendations to the government.

The Quaid-eAzam Police Medal was introduced after the death of the Founder of Nation of Pakistan Mohammad Ali Jinnah who was titled as Quaid-e-Azam for his role in leading people of Pakistan to gain Independence and creating a separate Homeland for Muslims of Pakistan.

Since 1971, the award is conferred on police officers of distinguished merit and extraordinary ability and gallantry across the country.

A panel of Senior Police officers in Provincial Police Department meets in March of each year to consider possible nominations to the above Award. The recommendations are forwarded to State / Provincial Government.

The Provincial Governments, through a specially constituted panel of eminent police officers and security personnel, evaluate the police officers from amongst their officers and ranks who are qualified and fulfill the criteria mentioned above.

After a detailed screening process and evaluation, the officers are recommended to the Federal Interior Ministry through respective Provincial Government by May 31st of each year.

A board consisting of the Ministry of Interior and others in the Cabinet Division scrutinizes nominations and evaluates the performance of the nominated officers and submits recommendations to the President’s Secretariat for further consideration by August 1st of each year.

The President of Pakistan considers the recommendations of the Cabinet Division and selects officers who in the president's opinion have performed distinguished work and are police officers of extraordinary ability.

The award is announced on Independence Day of Pakistan, which is August 14th of each year, and the awards are conferred upon the recipients on Pakistan Day i.e. March 23rd, of each year by the president of Pakistan himself or his authorized representatives.

== Eligibility ==
The Medal is open to all ranks of the police in the territories of Pakistan which includes officers as well as constables.

Extraordinary gallantry in saving life and property, or in preventing crime or arresting criminals, the risks incurred being estimated with due regard to the obligations and duties of the officer concerned.

A specially distinguished record in administrative or detective service or other Police services of conspicuous merit.

Extraordinary ability in organizing police or is maintaining their organization under special public disorder.

Special services in dealing with serious or widespread outbreaks of crime or public disorder.

== Notable recipients ==
- G. Asghar Malik, PSP, IGP, QPM is the former Inspector General of Police Punjab who was decorated with this medal.
- Inam Ghani QPM & Bar PSP IGP is the only police officer who has received QPM twice. He has received the medal once in Sindh as SP SITE Karachi and again as DPO Mansehra in the province of Khyber Pakhtunkhwa. Inam Ghani has served as IGP Punjab, IGP Pakistan Railways Police and IGP National Highways and Motorway Police.
- DIG Security and Emergency Services Division / DG Sindh Safe Cities Authority Dr. Maqsood Ahmed. The DIG Security, then the Commandant Special Security Unit (SSU) is conferred with the award for his extraordinary valor, presence of mind and leading the SSU commandos to execute successful operation against the terrorists of Karachi Airport attack in 2014. He has the distinction of founding the elite Special Security Unit (SSU) in 2010. The SSU is country's first and only ISO Certified 5000 personnel’s law enforcement organization. He in collaboration with other law enforcement agencies Army and Navy paved the way for SSU Commandos to gain advance training from professional instructors of other LEAs. He also established the country’s first ever and only Special Weapon and Tactics Team (S.W.A.T) to deal promptly any emergency situation created by terrorists in the metropolitan city of Karachi.
- Syed Kaleem Imam
- Tahir Dawar
- Moazzam Jah Ansari
- Zahid Nawaz Marwat
- Javeed Anwar

== See also ==
- List of things named after Muhammad Ali Jinnah
