= Islamabad Police =

Police force in Islamabad Capital Territory, Pakistan

Islamabad Police اسلام آباد پولیس
- Emblem

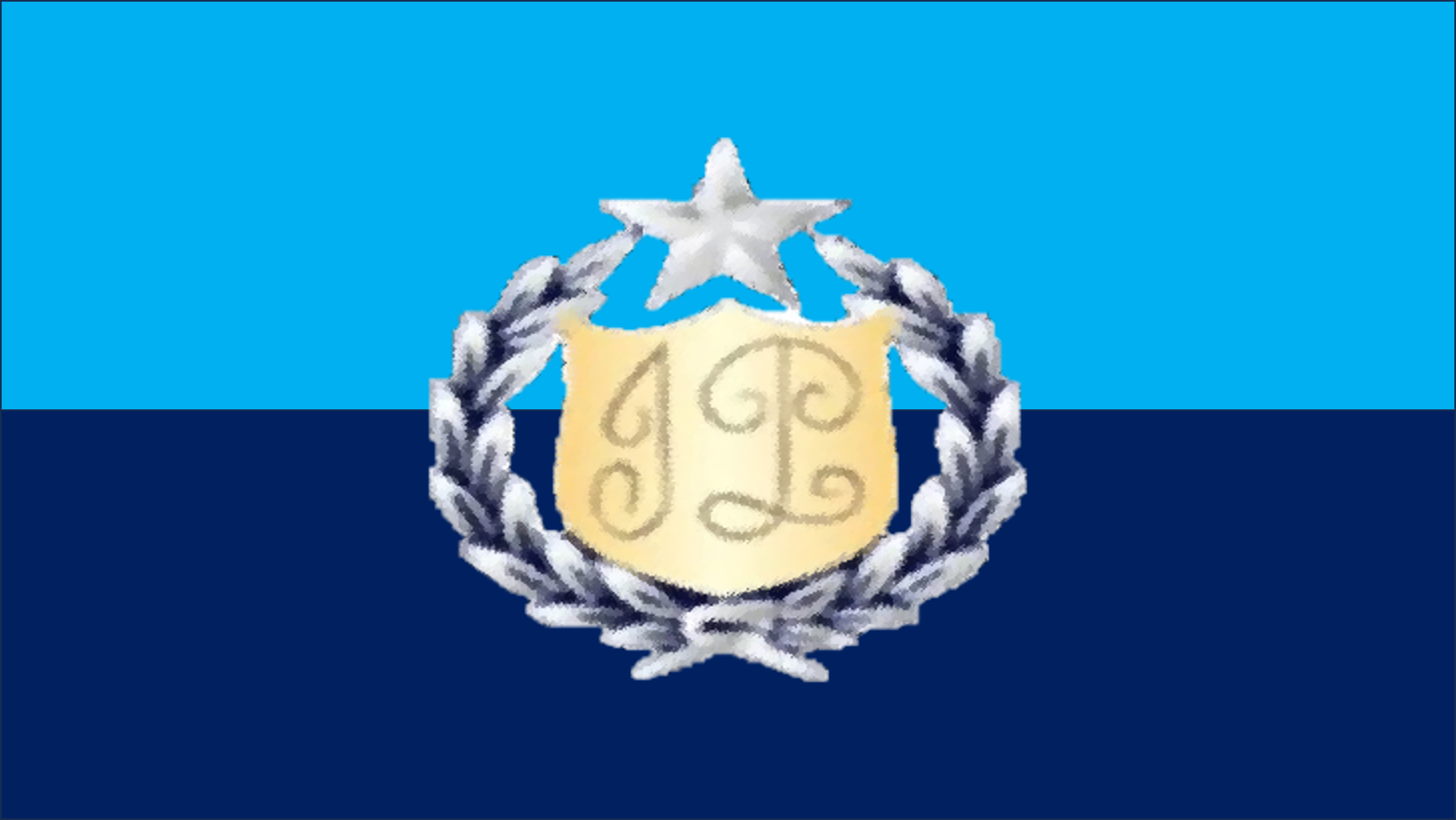
- Flag of ICT Police
- Common name: Islamabad Police; Capital Territory Police
- Abbreviation: ICT Police
- Motto: Pride in Service

Agency overview
- Formed: 1 January 1981; 45 years ago
- Preceding agency: Municipal Police
- Employees: 12,625

Jurisdictional structure
- Operations jurisdiction: Islamabad, Pakistan
- Map of Islamabad Police's jurisdiction
- Area: 906.50 square kilometers
- Population: 1,875,000
- Legal jurisdiction: Islamabad Capital Territory
- Governing body: Government of Islamabad
- General nature: Local civilian police

Operational structure
- Headquarters: Police Lines, H-11, Islamabad
- Agency executive: Capt (Retd) Muhammad Sohail Chaudhry, Inspector General of Police
- Parent agency: Police Service of Pakistan

Facilities
- Stations: 32

Website
- islamabadpolice.gov.pk

Islamabad Capital Territory Police (Urdu: اسلام آباد دارلحکومت علاقہ پولیس), also known as Islamabad Police, is a police force formed in 1981 to police Islamabad Capital Territory, Pakistan under administrative control of the Chief Commissioner, Islamabad Capital Territory Administration.

The force is headed by a senior officer (BS-21) of the Police Service of Pakistan, who serves as the Inspector General of the law enforcement agency. It has 12,625 employees, and consists of 32 police stations.

== History ==
The ICT Police was formed via Presidential Order No. 17 and 18, in 1980.

== Departments ==
- Islamabad Traffic Police
- Islamabad City Police
- Counter Terrorism Department
- Special Branch (Intelligence unit)
- Investigation Branch
- Safe City Branch
- IT Branch
- Islamabad Police (Establishment and Headquarters)

== Services ==
Service colour	Sky blue and Dark blue
Uniform colour	Sky blue, Dark blue

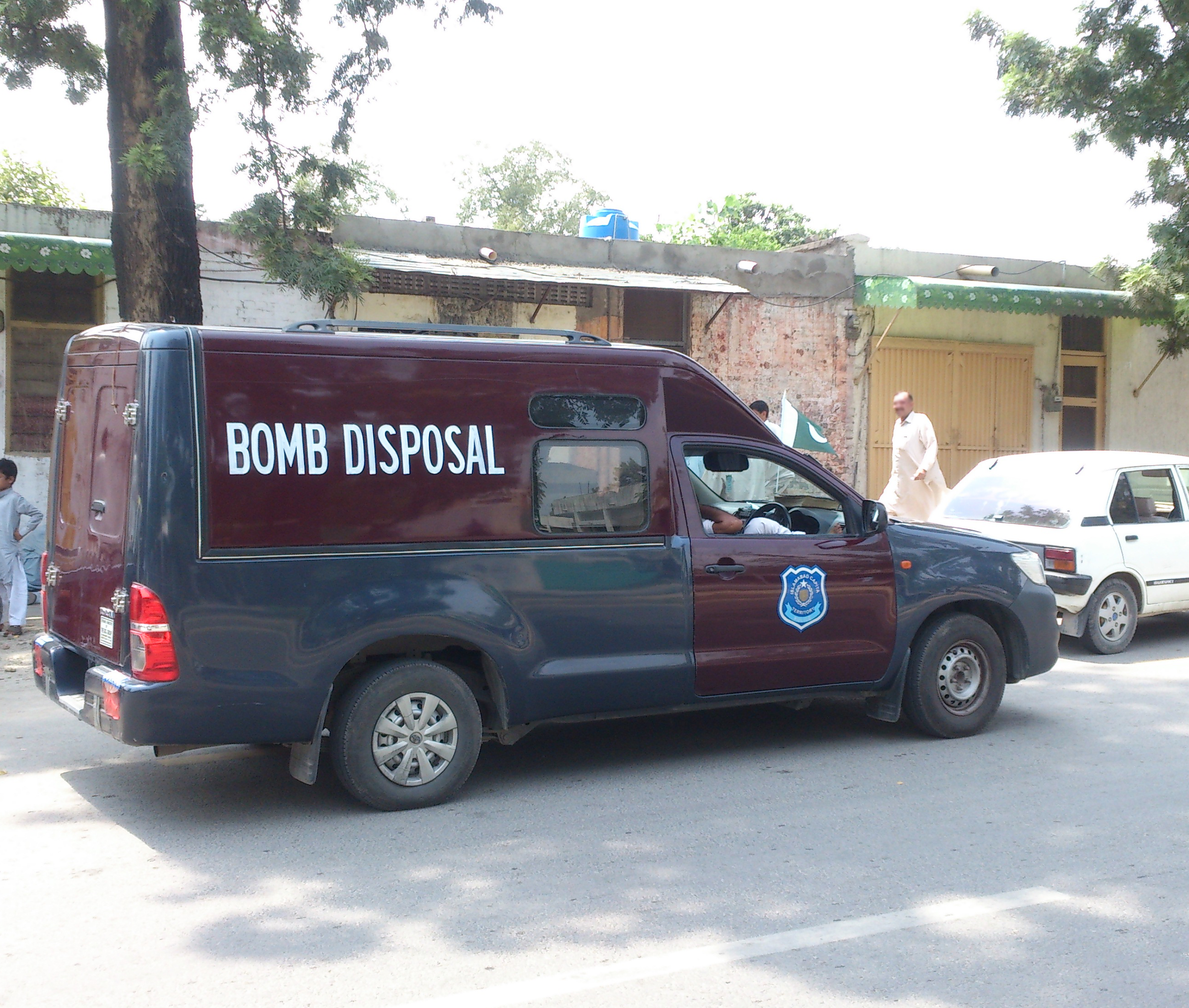
Islamabad Police Bomb Disposal Squad van.

- 24 Hours Helpline
- Emergency Help
- Theft Reporting Counter
- Child Lost and Found Center
- Blood Donor's Directory
- Security Alarm System
- Mobile Forensic Lab
- Bomb Disposal Squad

== Special units ==
- Counter Terrorism Unit (CTU)
- Counter Extremism Unit (CEU)
- Minority Protection Unit (MPU)
- Dolphin Patrolling Unit (DPU)
- Anti-Riot Unit (ARU)
- Medical Unit (MU)
- Special Protection Unit (SPU)
- Special Investigation Unit (SIU)

== Vehicles ==
- Honda Civic (seventh generation)
- Honda Civic (eighth generation)
- Toyota Corolla
- Toyota Hilux
- Foton Tunland
- Honda CB125
- Honda CB150
- Toyota Land Cruiser Prado
- Toyota Prius
- Honda CBR250F
- Suzuki Inazuma 250
- BYD Atto 2
- BYD Sealion 7
- GWM Ora 07
- Ridarra RD6
- Mohafiz (II, III, IV, V)
- Zarb-e-Haider (Light APC)

== Crime Investigation Agency (CIA) ==
CIA is the Investigation Wing of Islamabad Capital Territory Police working under the supervision of a Superintendent of Police (SP). It is responsible for tracing out heinous cases referred to it by SSP. The office of CIA Wing is located in I-9 Markaz and is usually run by a Deputy superintendent of police (DSP) ranked officer who heads around 70 officers. The wing has developed specialized skills over the years to locate gang members and other criminals. Overall, it had busted many gangs and criminals since it came into existence. The Anti Car Lifting Cell (ACLC) is another wing of CIA. It is headed by an Inspector having 48 personnel.

== Anti-Terrorist Squad (ATS) ==
The ATS is a special police commando force, which is a part of ICT Police that is distinguished by their full black uniform and maroon beret. Police officers from all over the country can enroll for ATS by qualifying their rigorous physical test. Its function is to investigate the activities of organized criminal groups and counter terrorist activities. This unit also coordinates with other similar agencies in the country.

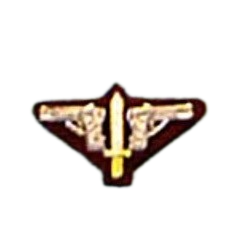
Anti-Terrorist Squad (ATS) badge

== Islamabad Police Ranks ==
Rank group	General/flag officers		Senior officers			Junior officers		
Islamabad Police	Inspector General of Islamabad Police	Deputy Inspector General of Islamabad Police						
Islamabad Police	Inspector General of Police (IGP)	Deputy Inspector General of Police (DIG)	Assistant Inspector General of Police / Senior Superintendent of Police (AIG/SSP)	Superintendent of Police (SP)	Superintendent of Police (SP)	Deputy Superintendent of Police (DSP)	Assistant Superintendent of Police (ASP)	Assistant Superintendent of Police (ASP)

Rank group	Junior commissioned officers			Non commissioned officer			Enlisted
Islamabad Police	Inspector of Islamabad Police	Sub Inspector of Islamabad Police	Assistant Sub Inspector of Islamabad Police	Head Constable of Islamabad Police	Havildar of Islamabad Police	Naik of Islamabad Police	No insignia
Islamabad Police	Inspector انسپکٹر	Sub Inspector سب انسپکٹر	Assistant Sub Inspectorاسسٹنٹ سب انسپکٹر	Head Constable ہیڈ کانسٹیبل	Police Havildar پولیس حوالدار	Police Naik پولیس نائک	Constable سپاہی

== Inspector Generals ==
Inspector Generals of Islamabad Police
S.No	Name	Tenure start	Tenure end	Ref.
1	Muhammad Nawaz Malik	1 January 1981	8 August 1986	
2	Khawar Zaman	4 September 1986	9 May 1988	
3	Wajahat Latif	21 May 1988	14 January 1990	
4	Iftikhar Rashid	14 January 1990	1 July 1991	
5	M. Mohsin	19 Apr 1993	28 May 1993	
6	Jehanzaib Burki	28 May 1993	9 March 1994	
6	Jehanzaib Burki	12 May 1992	19 April 1993	
7	Asad Mehmood Alvi	1 June 1994	18 February 1996	
8	Abdul Qadir Haye	19 February 1996	26 November 1996	
9	Saleem Tariq Lone	26 May 1997	1 September 1998	
10	Israr Ahmed	1 September 1998	27 October 1999	
11	M.R. Zia	26 November 1996	24 May 1997	
11	M.R. Zia	27 October 1999	4 November 1999	
12	Major (R) Mian Zaheer Ahmed	18 November 1999	20 March 2002	
13	Muhammad Akram	30 March 2002	13 November 2003	
14	Fiaz Ahmad Khan Toru	11 November 2003	1 November 2004	
15	Tallat Mehmood Tariq	6 November 2004	21 July 2005	
16	Iftikhar Ahmad	21 July 2005	27 August 2007	
17	Shahid Nadeem Baloach	20 September 2007	8 May 2008	
18	Syed Asghar Raza Gardezi	8 May 2008	31 December 2008	
19	Kalb-i-Abbas	1 January 2009	24 May 2009	
20	Syed Kaleem Imam	25 May 2009	24 January 2011	
21	Wajid Ali Durrani	24 January 2011	16 June 2011	
22	Bani-Amin Khan	17 June 2011	23 July 2013	
23	Sikander Hayat	23 July 2013	March 2014	
24	Aftab Cheema	24 April 2014	21 August 2014	
25	Tahir Alam Khan	1 September 2014	31 January 2016	
26	Tariq Masood Yasin	13 April 2016	March 2017	
27	Muhammad Khalid Khattak	1 April 2017	8 December 2017	
28	Dr. Sultan Azam Temuri	9 December 2017	13 June 2018	
29	Jan Muhammad	14 June 2018	3 November 2018	
30	Muhammad Aamir Zulfiqar Khan	4 November 2018	6 January 2021	
31	Qazi Jamil-ur-Rehman	7 January 2021	6 December 2021	
32	Muhammad Ahsan Younas	7 December 2021	21 May 2022	
33	Dr. Akbar Nasir Khan	21 May 2022	April 2024	
34	Syed Ali Nasir Rizvi	April 2024	16 September 2026	
35	Capt (Retd),Muhammad Sohail Chaudhry	16 September 2026	Till Date	

== Picture gallery ==
=== City Police ===
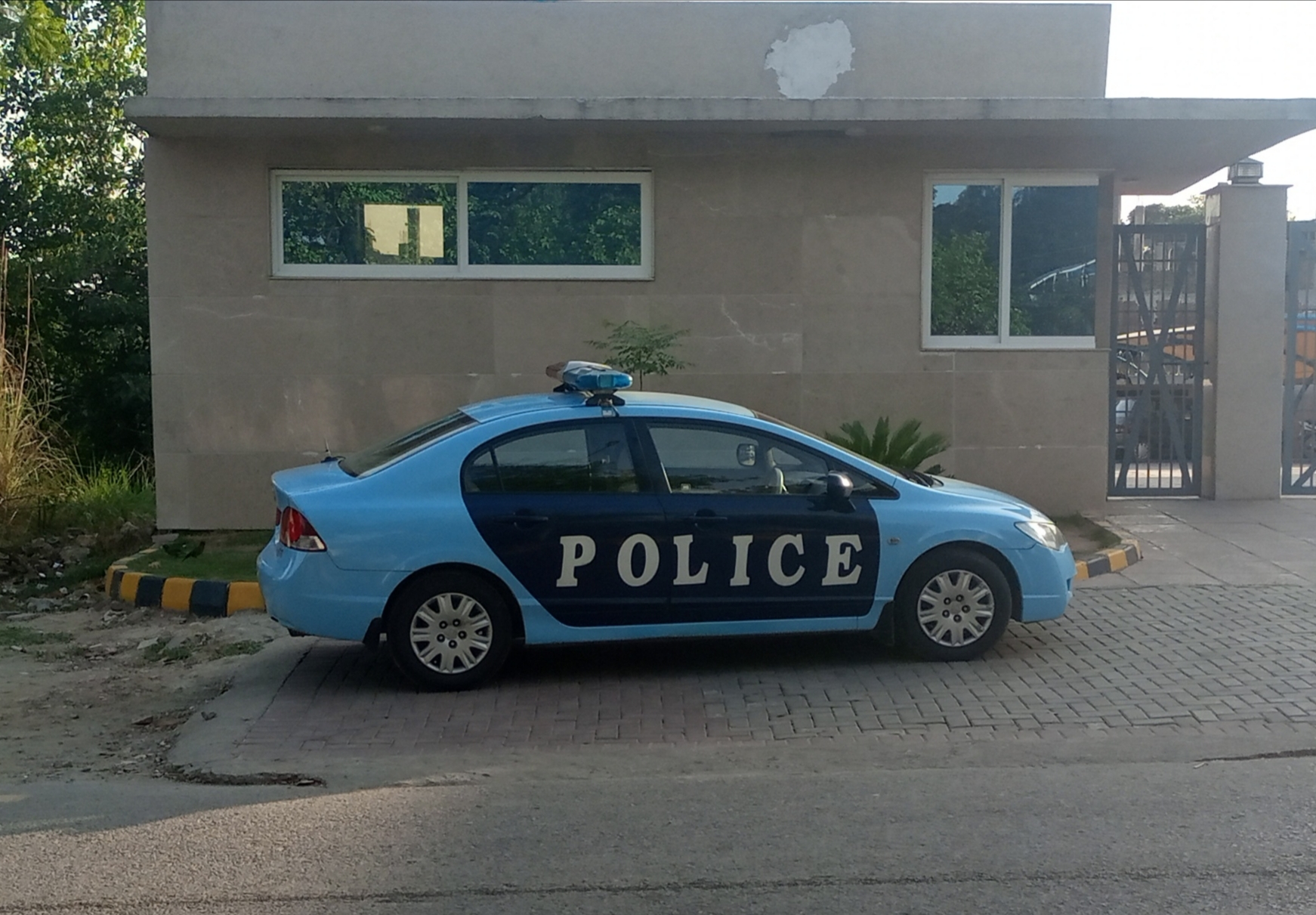
A Honda Civic patrolling car of Islamabad Capital Police Department on duty

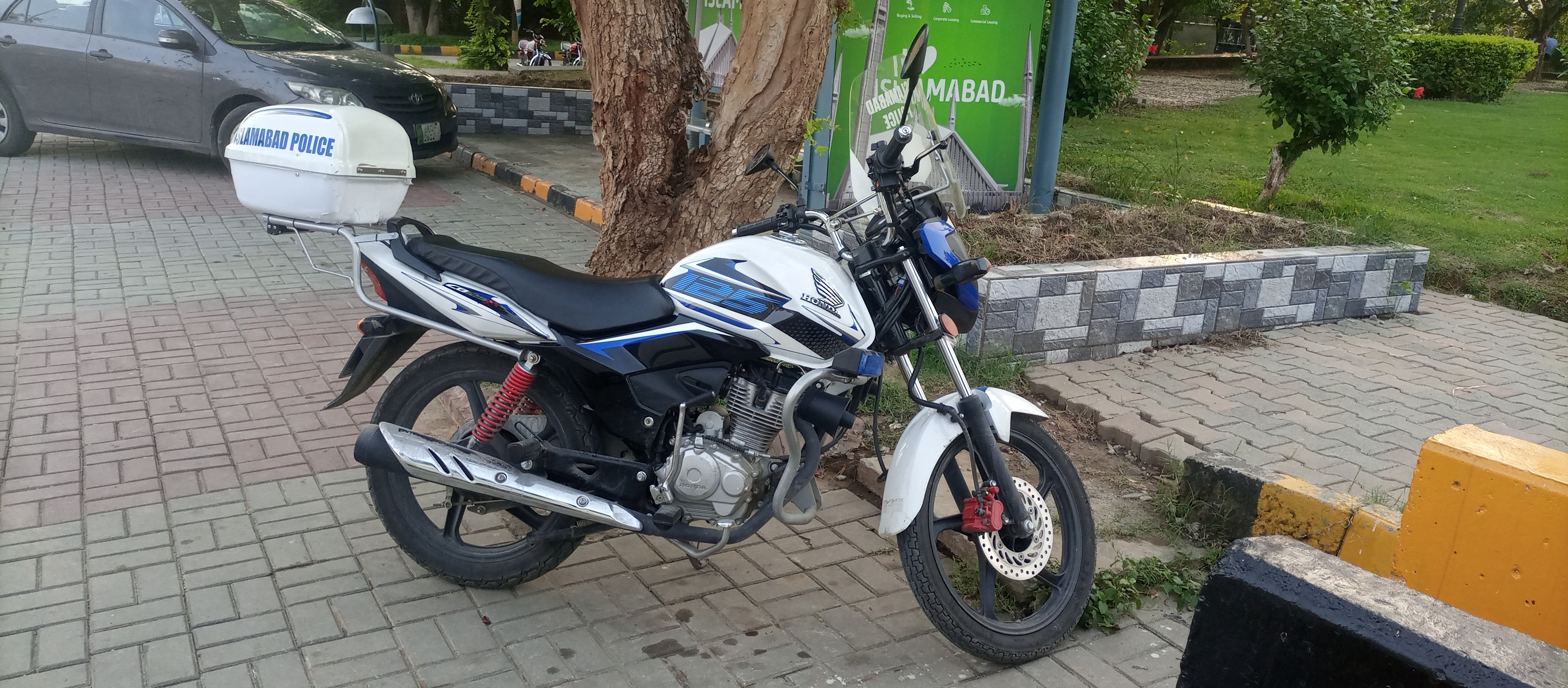
A Honda CB125 patrolling bike of Islamabad Police

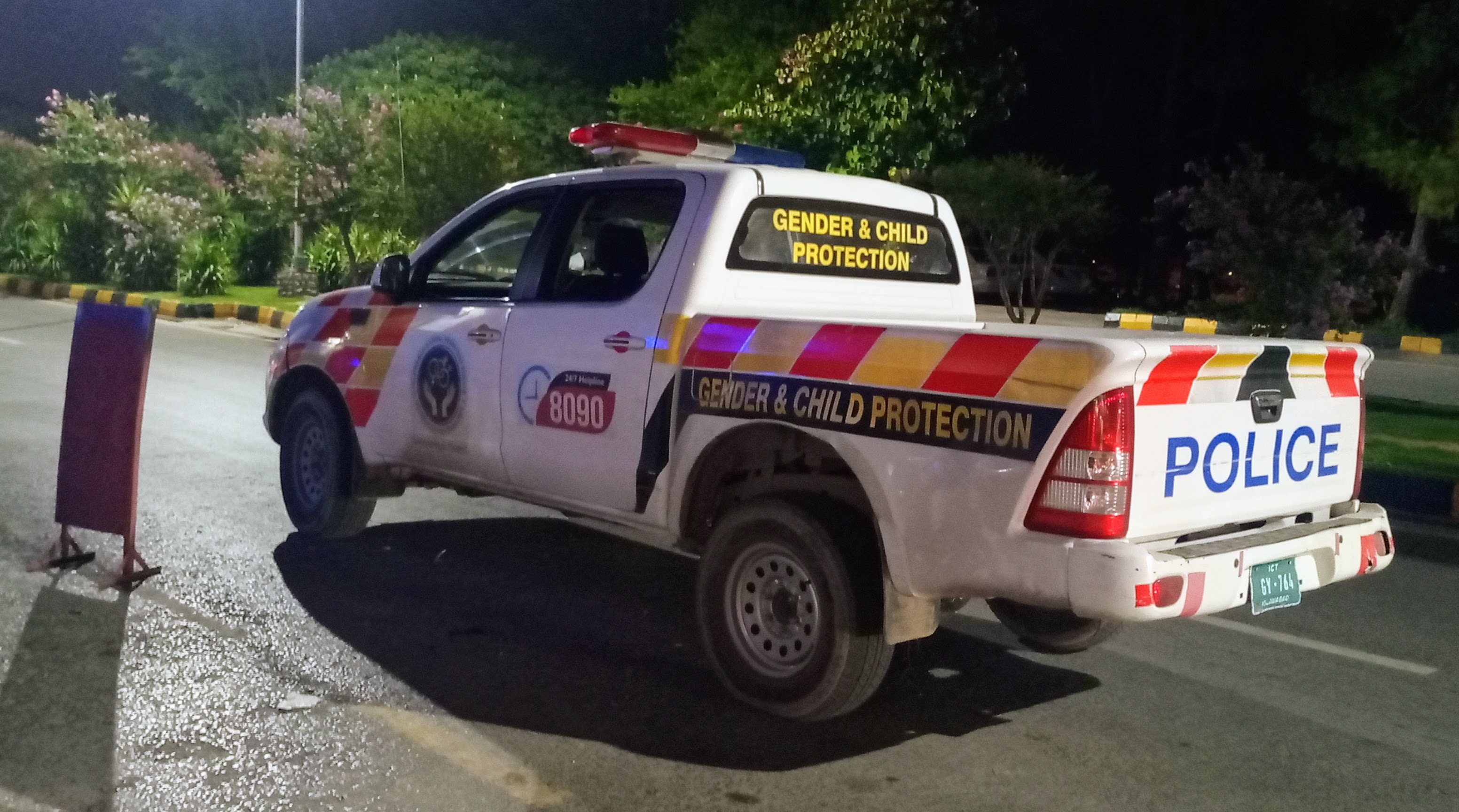
Islamabad Police Gender & Child Protection Unit Vehicle

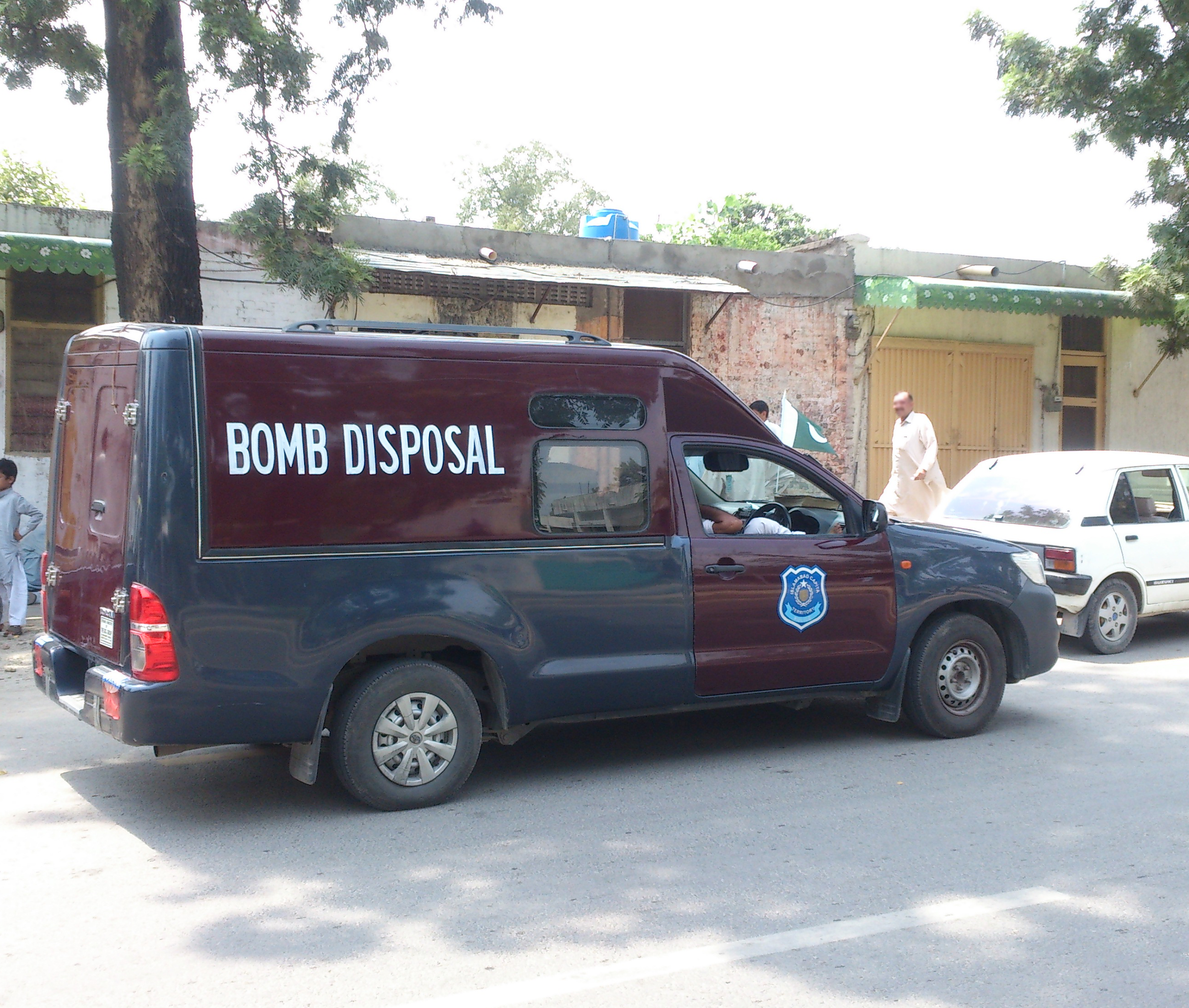
A Bomb Disposal Squad vehicle

=== Traffic Police ===
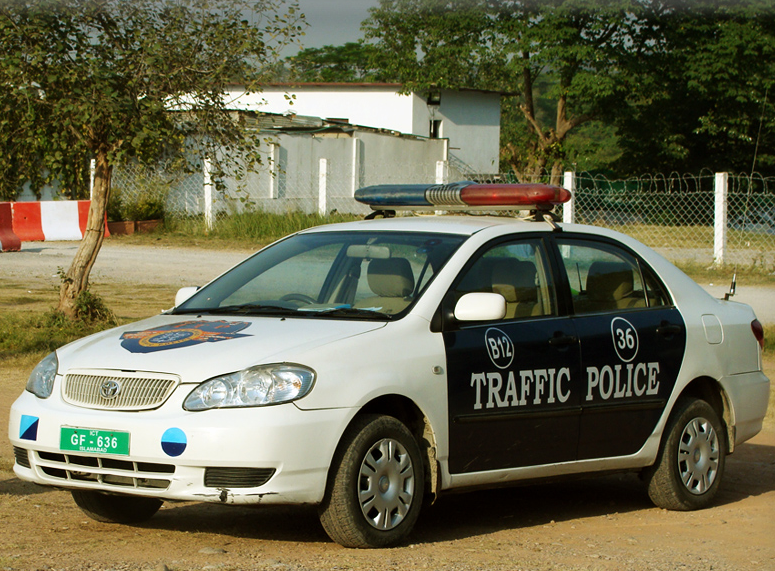
A 2007 Toyota Corolla of the Islamabad Traffic Police on Duty.

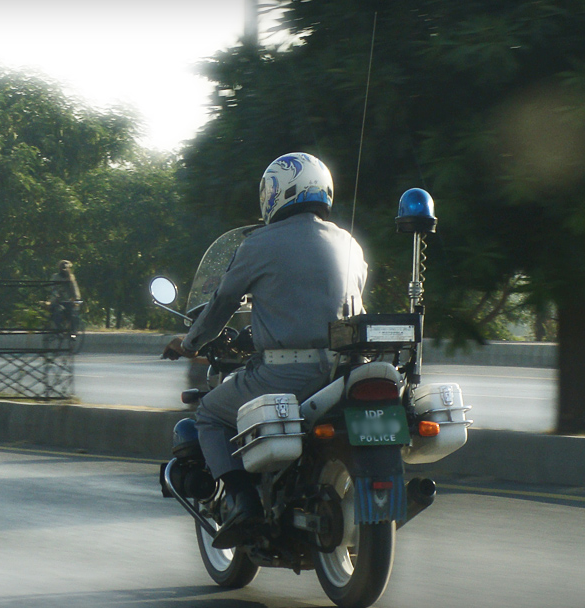
An Islamabad Traffic Police Suzuki motorbike patrolling.

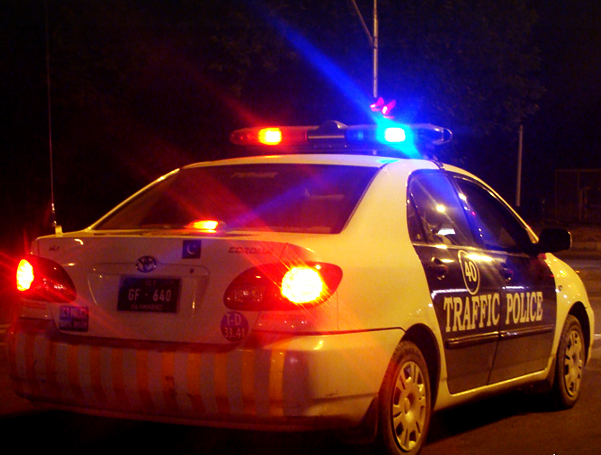
An Islamabad Traffic Police 2007 Toyota Corolla patrolling at night.

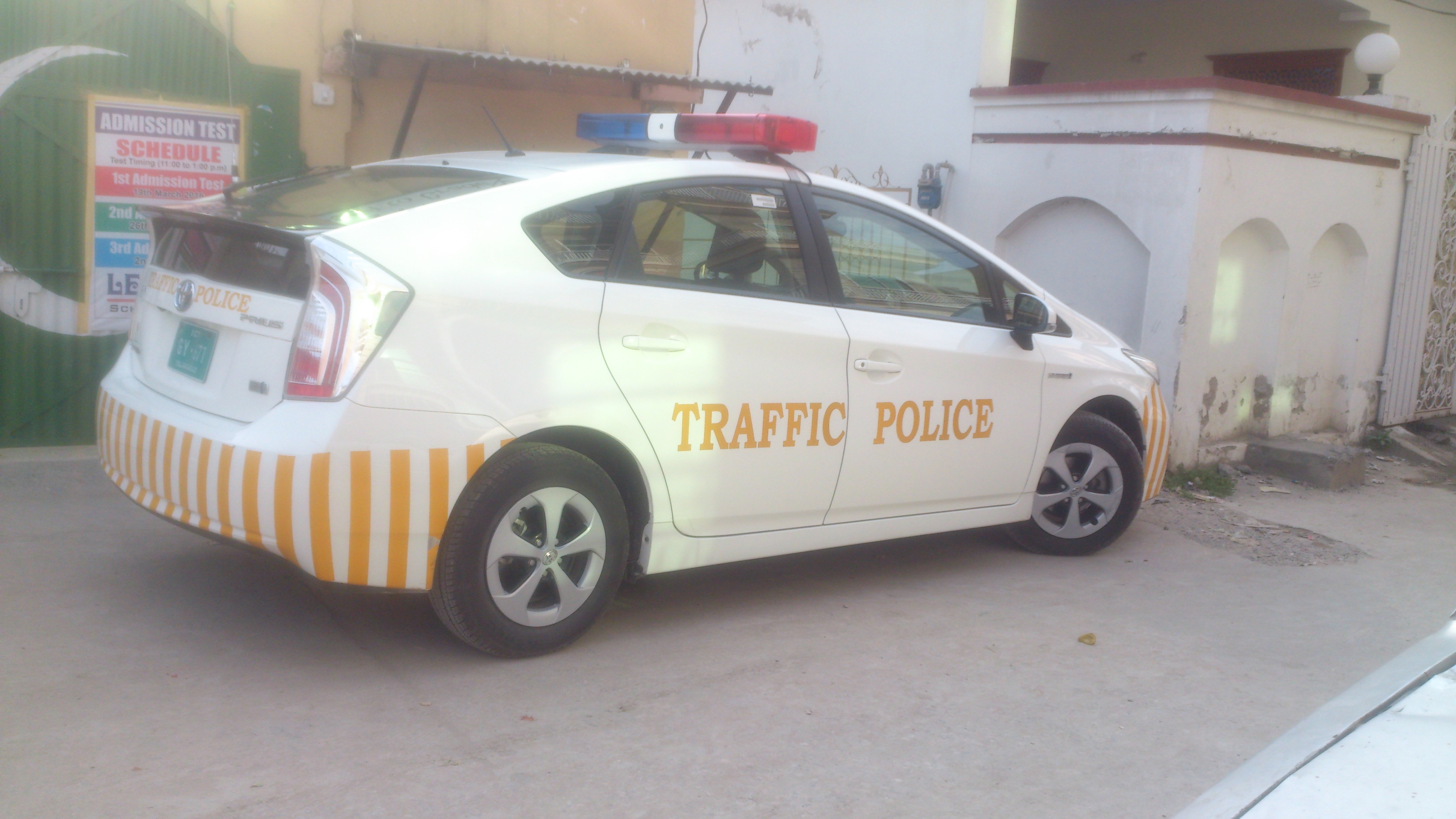
Islamabad Traffic Police 2016 Toyota Prius.

== See also ==
- Law enforcement in Pakistan
- National Police Hospital (Pakistan)
