= National Police Hospital =

National Police Hospital may refer to:

- National Police Hospital (Pakistan)
- National Police Hospital station
