= Mushtaq Ahmad Mahar =

Pakistani police officer

Inspector General of Sindh Police
- In office February 2020 – 18 May 2022
- Preceded by: Syed Kaleem Imam

Military service
- Allegiance: Pakistan
- Rank: Inspector General

Mushtaq Ahmad Mahar (Urdu: مشتاق احمد مہر) is a Pakistani civil servant and police officer who served as Inspector General of Sindh Police from February 2020 to May 2022. On 18 May 2022, Mahar was removed as Sindh's Inspector General.
