= Provincial governments of Pakistan =

The four provincial governments of Pakistan administer the four provinces of Pakistan. There is also a federal capital territory and two territories which have governments largely similar to those of the provinces. The head of each province is a non-executive Governor appointed by the President. The Governors play a similar role at the provincial level, as the President does at the federal level. Each province has a directly elected unicameral legislature (provincial assembly), with members elected for five-year terms. Each provincial assembly elects a Chief Minister, who then selects a cabinet of ministers from amongst the members of the Provincial Assembly. Each province also has a High Court, which forms part of the superior judiciary.

== Provincial governments ==
- Government of Balochistan
  - Governor of Balochistan
  - Chief Minister of Balochistan
  - Provincial Assembly of Balochistan
  - Balochistan High Court
- Government of Khyber Pakhtunkhwa
  - Governor of Khyber Pakhtunkhwa
  - Chief Minister of Khyber Pakhtunkhwa
  - Provincial Assembly of Khyber Pakhtunkhwa
  - Peshawar High Court
- Government of Punjab
  - Governor of Punjab
  - Chief Minister of Punjab
  - Provincial Assembly of the Punjab
  - Lahore High Court
- Government of Sindh
  - Governor of Sindh
  - Chief Minister of Sindh
  - Provincial Assembly of Sindh
  - Sindh High Court

=== Former Provincial Government ===
- Government of East Pakistan
  - Governor of East Pakistan
  - Chief Minister of East Pakistan
  - Provincial Assembly of East Pakistan
  - Dacca High Court

== Territorial/associated governments ==
- Government of the Islamabad Capital Territory
  - Islamabad Capital Territory Administration
    - Chief Commissioner of Islamabad Capital Territory
  - Islamabad High Court
- Government of Azad Kashmir
  - President of Azad Kashmir
  - Prime Minister of Azad Kashmir
  - Azad Kashmir Legislative Assembly
  - Supreme Court of Azad Kashmir
- Government of Gilgit-Baltistan
  - Governor of Gilgit-Baltistan
  - Chief Minister of Gilgit-Baltistan
  - Assembly of Gilgit-Baltistan
  - Supreme Appellate Court Gilgit-Baltistan
