= Islamabad Traffic Police =

- Abbreviation: ITP

Agency overview
- Formed: January 28, 2006
- Preceding agency: Traffic Police

Jurisdictional structure
- Operations jurisdiction: Islamabad, Pakistan
- Governing body: Islamabad Capital Territory Police
- General nature: Local civilian police

Operational structure
- Headquarters: Islamabad, Pakistan
- Sworn members: 709 (28 January 2006)
- Elected officer responsible: Dr. Mustafa Tanveer, Senior Superintendent of Police (SSP)

Website
- http://www.islamabadtrafficpolice.gov.pk
- Data for organization as at December, 2009.

Islamabad Traffic Police (Urdu: اسلام آباد ٹریفک پولیس) is a "model traffic police force" formed under the Capital Territory Police in 2006 to "bring a new and healthy change in the traffic system" in Islamabad, the capital of Pakistan.

The police force is responsible for the enforcement of traffic rules, education of traffic laws to the community, issuance of driver' licenses to qualified drivers, advice to the Capital Development Authority on road engineering issues, and regulation of vehicular and pedestrian traffic on highways, avenues and roads of Islamabad and is rated as second corruption free police organization in Pakistan, after National Highways and Motorways Police.

The department is, however, unable to enforce a system of points for traffic violations, and only levies monetary fines to the violators, thus deterrent effects on violators have not been produced.

== History ==
The Police Department was established on the pattern of an earlier success story in Pakistan, National Highways and Motorway Police (NH&MP) which was established in 1997. The Islamabad Traffic Police (ITP) came of age between 2007 and 2010 and came to be known as a corruption free and equal application of law police organization. The Model Traffic Police which later came to be known as Islamabad Traffic Police, was planned and designed by Syed Abbas Ahsan, Superintendent of Police in 2005 on the pattern of National Highways and Motorway Police. Mr. Sultan Azim Temuri, Senior Superintendent of Police, and Mr. Ashfaq Ahmad Khan, Superintendent of Police, were the first officers of the Police Service of Pakistan (PSP) who led this police organization.

The organization was awarded ISO 9001: 2008 certification on 23 June 2009 for introducing state of the art driver's license, the first police radio station, ITP FM 92.4 headed by Aisha Jamil, the new laws of prohibition on using mobile phone while driving and the wearing of seat-belt while driving, and client-oriented policing service in Pakistan. Hallmark of this traffic police department is that rule of law prevails on the roads of Islamabad, and driver's licenses are issued to only the qualified drivers after through testing of driving ability and medical fitness. The organization also has a Traffic Theme Park and Driving School for the education of school kids and driving training to the aspirants.

Ever since the ITP took over the control in Islamabad, the incidents of road accidents have decreased, and drivers are seen wearing seat belts and avoiding to use mobile phone while driving, indicators of rule of law hardly seen in many other cities of Pakistan and other developing countries of South Asia and world as a whole.

== Objectives ==
- Education/awareness in educational institution and other non-professional and non-professional organizations
- Mass awareness about road safety through a well decorated float established on 20 wheels trailer
- Radio program
- Distribution of hand bills and pamphlets at roads along with briefing
- Road safety awareness walks
- Speech competition
- Road safety seminar
- Road safety gala

== Equal implementation of law ==
On 20 July 2009, the Islamabad Traffic Police issued a ticket to the son of Prime Minister Yousaf Raza Gillani for violating traffic rules thus maintaining their commitment to ensure equal implementation of law in the capital city. Over the last many years, the ITP has fined hundred of VIPs, civil servants, Army and Police officers, Parliamentarians, Judges and Journalists and proved its slogan of equal application of law.

== Gallery ==
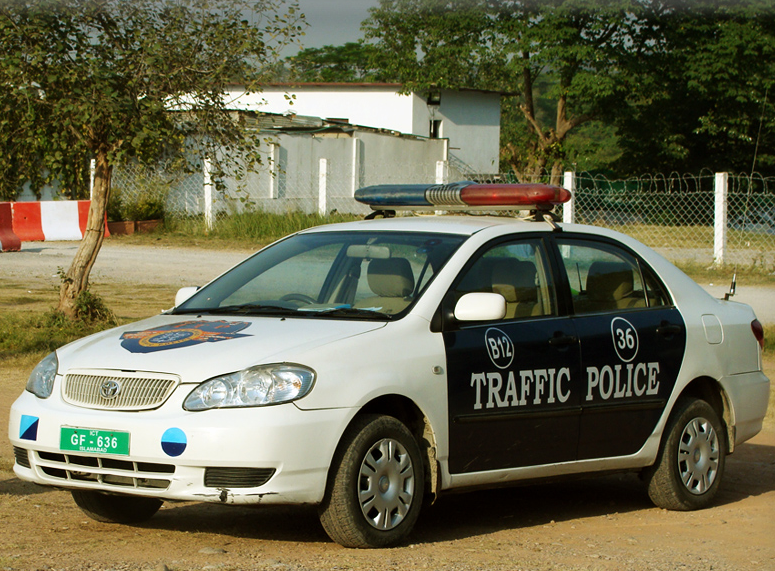
A 2007 Toyota Corolla of the Islamabad Traffic Police on Duty

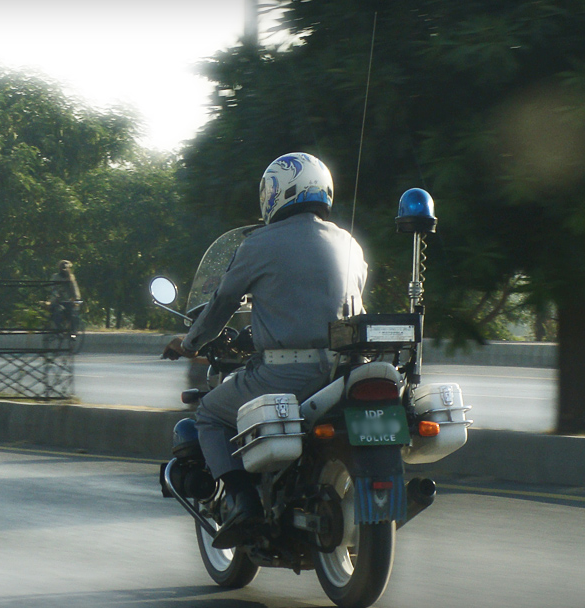
An Islamabad Traffic Police Suzuki motorbike patrolling

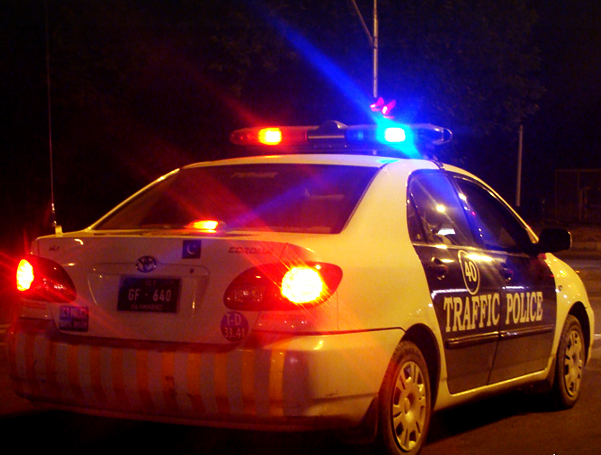
An Islamabad Traffic Police 2007 Toyota Corolla patrolling at night

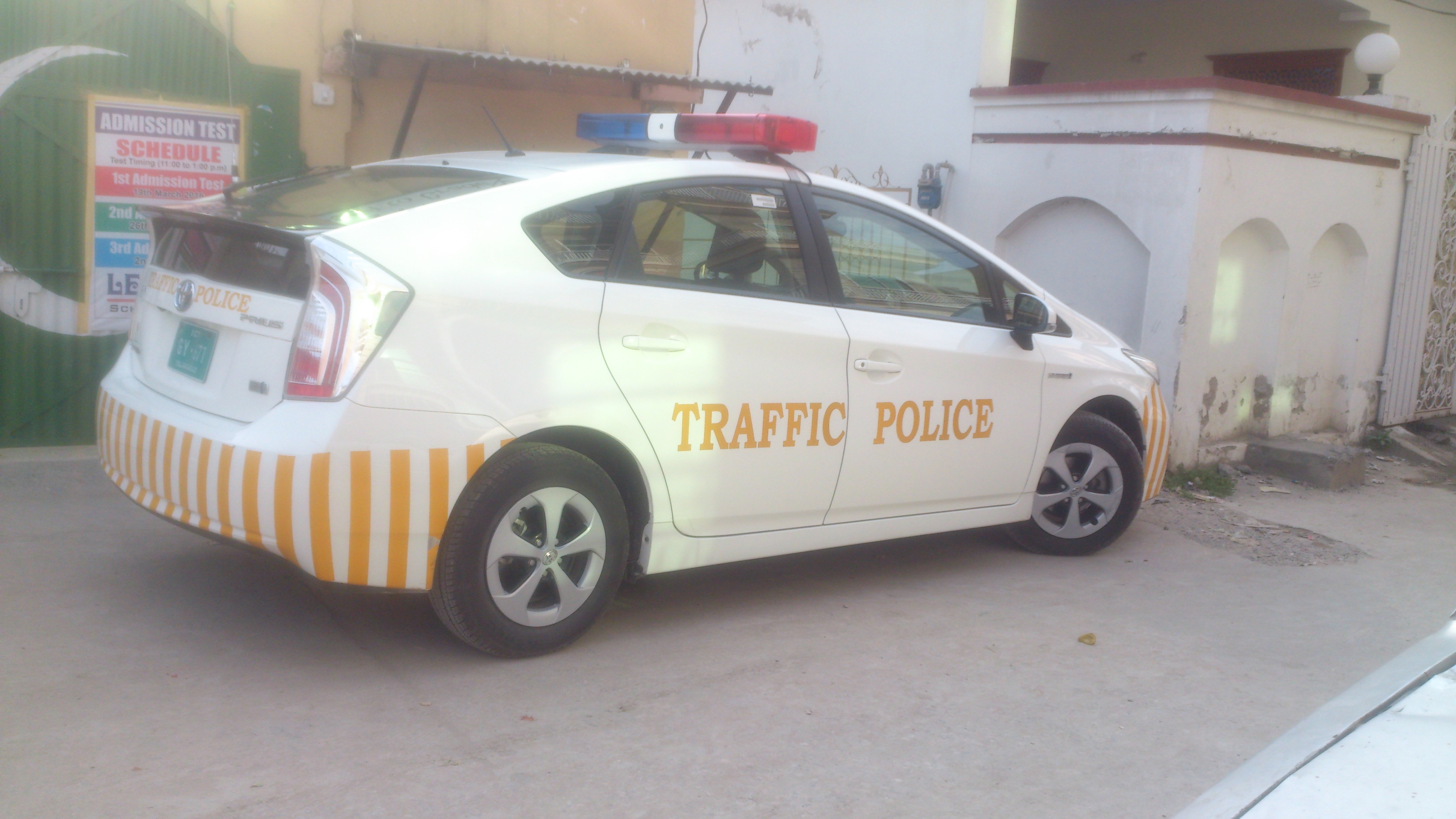
Islamabad Traffic Police 2016 Toyota Prius

== See also ==
- Capital Territory Police
- Law enforcement in Pakistan
- National Highways and Motorway Police
