= Muhammad Ahsan Younas =

Pakistani politician

Former Inspector General of Islamabad Police
- In office 7 December 2021 – 21 May 2022
- Preceded by: Qazi Jamil ur Rehman
- Succeeded by: Dr. Akbar Nasir Khan

Muhammad Ahsan Younas is a Pakistani police officer who served as Inspector General of Islamabad Police from December 2021 to May 2022.
