= Afzal Ali Shigri =

Pakistani columnist and former bureaucrat

- افضل علی شیگری
- Citizenship: Pakistani
- Occupations: Civil servant Diplomat
- Writing career
- Language: Balti, Urdu, English

Afzal Ali Shigri is a former civil servant and columnist in Pakistan from Shigar, Gilgit-Baltistan. He served in several key roles, including Inspector General Police Sindh, Commandant of the National Police Academy, Commandant of the Frontier Constabulary and Director General of the National Police Bureau.

Notably, he was the first Inspector General of the National Highways & Motorway Police. Shigri began his career in the Police Service of Pakistan in 1968, holding positions such as Assistant Superintendent, Superintendent, Deputy Inspector General, and Inspector General of Police before retiring in 2002. He remains active as a security analyst and regularly contributes columns to Dawn and other newspapers.
