= Amjad Javed Saleemi =

Inspector General of Punjab Police and Sindh Police

Amjad Javed Saleemi امجد جاوید سلیمی

Inspector General of Punjab Police
- In office Unknown – 15 April 2019
- Appointed by: Imran Khan
- Preceded by: Syed Kaleem Imam
- Succeeded by: Arif Nawaz

Inspector General of Sindh Police
- In office Unknown – 6 September 2018
- Succeeded by: Syed Kaleem Imam

Personal details
- Born: 1 February 1960 (age 66) Toba Tek Singh

Amjad Javed Saleemi (Urdu: امجد جاوید سلیمی) is a retired Pakistani police officer who served as Inspector General of Sindh Police (IGSP) and Inspector General of Punjab Police (IGPP). He joined the Police Service of Pakistan in 1986 and belongs to the 14th Common Training Programme of the Civil Service of Pakistan. He was born in Toba Tek Singh, Punjab, Pakistan and belongs to an Arain family of Punjab.

== Career ==
Saleemi served as IGSP until 6 September 2018 and was later appointed as IGPP and served on that post until 15 April 2019. He was a Grade 22 officer at the time. On 27 May 2019, he was appointed as Federal Secretary Narcotics Control, a post he held until his retirement on 1 February 2020.

== See also ==
- Central Superior Services
