= Sindh Safe Cities Authority =

Pakistani government entity

Agency overview
- Website: ssca.ssusindhpolice.gos.pk

The Sindh Safe Cities Authority (SSCA) is a government entity established under the Cities Ordinance 2020 to enhance public safety in major cities of Sindh province, Pakistan. Its primary function is to develop and maintain an integrated command, control, and communication system for the police, focusing on public safety through surveillance and response capabilities.
