= National Police Hospital (Pakistan) =

- Islamabad Capital Territory Police

Geography
- Location: Islamabad, Pakistan
- Coordinates: 33.648°N 73.014°E

Organisation
- Care system: Public
- Type: Specialist

Services
- Beds: 100 (planned)

History
- Constructed: 2023

Links
- Lists: Hospitals in Pakistan

The National Police Hospital is a hospital in Islamabad, Pakistan. It provides healthcare services to approximately 12,000 Pakistan police officers.

== History ==
Construction of Pakistan's first National Police Hospital began on 16 July 2023, after receiving approval from the Islamabad Capital Territory Police and the Planning Commission, Ministry of Planning Development & Special Initiatives. The establishment of this crucial healthcare facility was achieved through the concerted efforts of the Federal Minister for Planning, Ahsan Iqbal, and Interior Minister, Rana Sanaullah.

== Facilities ==
The hospital plans to have a capacity of 100 beds, serving the capital's police force. It will include sections with 12 beds for emergencies, 10 for orthopedics, 15 for cardiology, six beds each for surgical and cardiac intensive care units, 14 surgical beds, 15 for general medicine, eight for neurology, five for medical intensive care, four cardiac care units, and five beds dedicated to treating injuries from weapons and providing physiotherapy. Additionally, the hospital will offer modern amenities such as air ambulance services.

== Construction ==
The overall estimated cost for the extensive construction of the National Police Hospital is Rs. 6,479.879 million. For the fiscal year 2023-24, a budget allocation of Rs 1,197 million was secured to guarantee the project's timely completion. This impressive nine-story architectural structure will be situated in Police Lines.
