= Syed Kaleem Imam =

Pakistani police officer

Syed Kaleem Imam سید کلیم امام
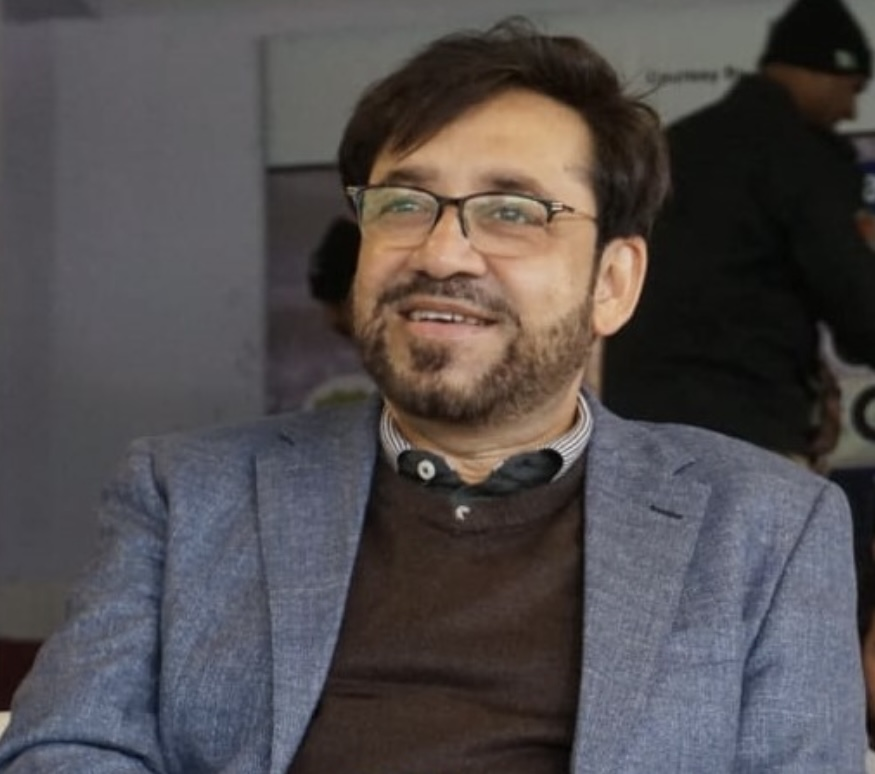
- Syed Kaleem Imam in 2020

Inspector General of National Highways & Motorway Police
- In office 4 March 2020 – April 2022

Inspector General of Sindh Police
- In office 7 September 2018 – 28 February 2020
- Appointed by: Imran Khan
- Preceded by: Amjad Javed Saleemi
- Succeeded by: Mushtaq Ahmad Mahar

Inspector General of Punjab Police
- In office June 2018 – 6 September 2018
- Appointed by: Nasirul Mulk
- Succeeded by: Amjad Javed Saleemi

Personal details
- Born: 18 April 1960 (age 66) Karachi
- Awards: 3 UN Peace Medals, Quaid-i-Azam Police Medal, President’s Police Medal, Sitara-i-Imtiaz, Tamgha-i-Imtiaz

Syed Kaleem Imam (Urdu: سید کلیم امام) is a retired Pakistani police officer who has served as Inspector General of National Highways & Motorway Police, IG Punjab and Federal Secretary of the Ministry of Narcotics Control.

== Early life ==
Imam was born in Karachi.

== Career ==
Imam became part of civil services of Pakistan on 1 November 1988. A Grade 22 officer, he previously served as Inspector General of Punjab Police from 13.06.2018 to 11.09.2018. He was transferred to Sindh Police as IGSP on 7 September 2018. He served as Inspector General of Sindh Police (IGSP) from 7 September 2018 to 28 February 2020. He retired with honour on 25 April 2022 after 33 years plus service.

== See also ==
- Central Superior Services
