= National Highways & Motorway Police =

Federal Law Enforcement Agency in Pakistan

National Highways & Motorway Police نیشنل ہائی ویز اینڈ موٹروے پولیس
- Abbreviation: NHMP

Agency overview
- Formed: 26 November 1997
- Preceding agency: Traffic Police

Jurisdictional structure
- Federal agency: Pakistan
- Operations jurisdiction: Pakistan
- General nature: Federal law enforcement; Civilian police

Operational structure
- Headquarters: Central Police Office, Mauve Area, G-11/1, Islamabad-44100; Pakistan
- Agency executive: Sultan Ahmad Chaudhry, PSP, Inspector General

Website
- nhmp.gov.pk

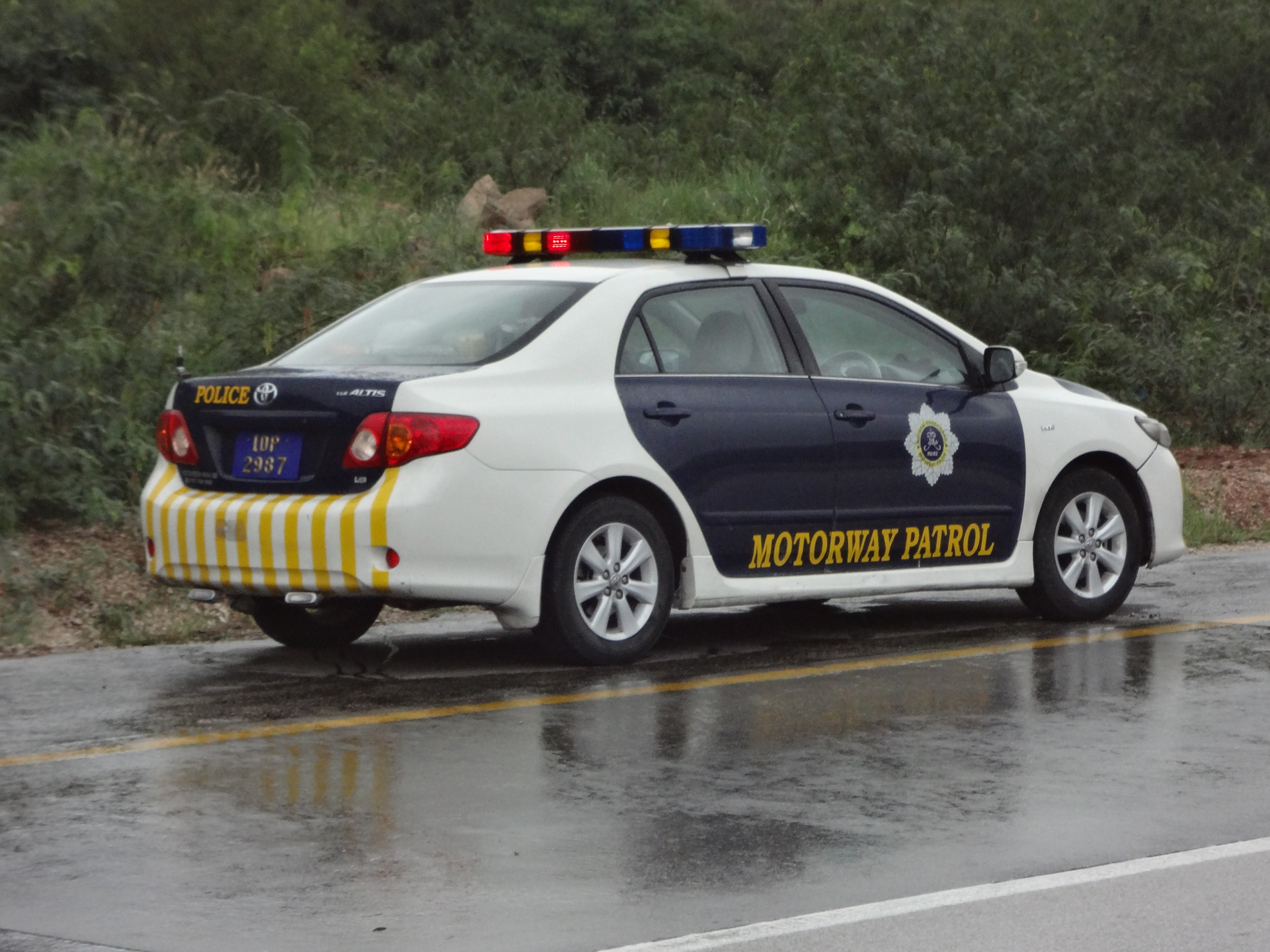
A Toyota Corolla patrol car of Pakistan's National Highways & Motorway Police on the M-2 motorway.

The National Highways & Motorway Police (Urdu: نیشنل ہائی ویز اینڈ موٹروے پولیس), abbreviated NHMP, is a police force in Pakistan that is responsible for enforcement of traffic and safety laws, security and recovery on Pakistan's National Highways and Motorway network. NHMP use SUVs, cars and heavy motorbikes for patrolling purposes and use speed cameras for enforcing speed limits.

== History ==
The Pakistan Motorways Police began in 1997 for policing Pakistan's newly constructed motorway network, starting with the M-2. Later, in June 2001, it was also assigned the additional task of patrolling Pakistan's National Highways starting with Pakistan's longest national highway, the N-5. Following this expansion, the force was renamed the "National Highways & Motorway Police" (NHMP). In February 2007, NHMP started policing the Makran Coastal Highway (N-10).

The Inspector General of Police (Enforcement), Afzal Ali Shigri, was tasked with preparing the plan for the new force. He was assisted by Shamim Ahmed, a junior officer from the National Transport Research Cell, who conceived, developed and prepared a proposal to establish a highway police force for the new motorway. With the change of government, the plan was shelved. It was later implemented, with slight modifications, by Iftikhar Rashid (Inspector General of Police).

== Organization ==
The NHMP is headquartered in Islamabad and is led by the Inspector-General of Police (IGP), who is assisted by four (4) Additional Inspectors General and eleven(11) Deputy Inspector-Generals (DIGs), each in charge of a separate branch. The rank structure is as follows:

- Inspector General of Police (IGP)
- Additional Inspector General of Police (Addl. IGP)
- Deputy Inspector General of Police (DIG)
- Assistant Inspector General of Police (AIG) / Senior Superintendent of Police (SSP)
- Superintendent of Police (SP)
- Deputy Superintendent of Police (DSP)
- Assistant Superintendent of Police (ASP)
- Inspector of Police (IP)
- Sub Inspector of Police (SIP)
- Assistant Sub Inspector of Police (ASIP)
- Head Constable of Police (HP)
- Constable of Police (CP)

== Area of Jurisdiction ==
For policing purposes, the national highways and motorway network is divided into Nine Zones, each headed by a DIG and supervised by three Addl. IGPs. Each Zone is divided into multiple "sectors" and led by a SSP/SP. Each sector is further divided into "beats", each led by an ASP/DSP.

- Currently Under Operations – 3,999 km roads
- Future Operations plan – 4659 km roads

=== Current Operations ===
Regions	Operational Roads	Length in km	Total Area in km	Executive
Additional IGP North, Islamabad				Additional Inspector General of Police Mr. Ashraf Zubair Siddiqui (PSP)
Motorway Zone (Islamabad)	M-1 (Peshawar – Islamabad); M-2 (Islamabad – Lahore); E-35 Hazara Motorway (Burhan – Mansehra)	155 km 367 km 182 km	704 km	Deputy Inspector General (DIG) of Motorway Police Motorway Zone, Mr. Salman Ali Khan (PSP)
N-5 North Zone (Islamabad)	N-5 (Peshawar – Lahore); N-75 IMDC (Islamabad - Murree)	393 km 43 km	436 km	Deputy Inspector General (DIG) of Motorway Police North Zone, Mr. Inaam Ur Rehman Malik (PSP)
SEW (Not a Zone)	Swat Expressway (Only Briefing - sunrise to sunset)	81 km	81 km	N/A
Additional IGP South, Karachi				Additional Inspector General of Police Mr. Javed Akbar Riaz (PSP) (Look After Charge)
N-5 South Zone (Karachi)	N-5 (Sadiqabad – Hyderabad); M-9 (Hyderabad – Karachi); N-55 (Jamshoro – Rattodero); Lyari Expressway	592 km 136 km 328 km 16 km	1072 km	Deputy Inspector General (DIG) of Motorway Police South Zone, Mr. Javed Akbar Riaz (PSP)
West Zone (Quetta)	N-10(Gwadar – Pasni – Makola); N-25 RCD (Hub to Uthal, Kalat-Quetta-Pishin); N-50 (Kuchlak Bypass to Killa Saifullah, Kuchlak-Khanozai-Killa Saifullah)	160 km 355 km 213 km	728 km	Deputy Inspector General (DIG) of Motorway Police West Zone, Dr. Quraish Khan (PSP), PhD, TI
Additional IGP Central, Lahore				Additional Inspector General of Police Mr. Ashraf Zubair Siddiqui (PSP) (Additional Charge)
Central Zone-I, (Lahore)	M-3 (Lahore – Abdul Hakeem) · M-2 (Bhera – Lahore) · M-11 (Sialkot –Lahore Motorway SLM) Lahore Eastern Bypass	230 km 206 km 103 km 18 km	557 km	Deputy Inspector General (DIG) of Motorway Police Mr. Imran Shahid (PSP)
Central Zone-II M-5 Zone(Multan)	M-5 (Multan – Sukkur) M-4 (Pindi Bhattian – Faisalabad – Multan)	392 km 294 km	686 km	Deputy Inspector General (DIG) of Motorway Police Mr. Dar Ali Khatak (PSP)
N-5 Central Zone (Lahore)	N-5 (Lahore – Sadiqabad)	588 km	588 km	Deputy Inspector General (DIG) of Motorway Police Mr. Shahid Javed (PSP)
Additional IGP HQ, Islamabad				N/A
Additional IGP (Planning, Development & Restructuring), Islamabad				N/A
Commandant National Highways & Motorway Police Training College, Sheikhupura				Deputy Inspector General (DIG) Mr. Masroor Alam Kolachi (PSP)
DIG Headquarters Islamabad				Deputy Inspector General (DIG) Mr. Afzal Ahmad Kausar (PSP)
DIG (Operations & Evaluation), Islamabad.				Deputy Inspector General (DIG) Mr. Asghar Ali Yousafzai (PSP)
DIG (HRM), Islamabad				Deputy Inspector General (DIG) Mr. Syed Fareed Ali (PSP)

=== Proposed Deployment ===
Future Roads	Area	Length in km
M-6	Sukkur - Hyderabad	306 km
M-8	Hoshab - Gwadar	193 km
M-10	Northern Bypass Karachi	57 km
	Hakla - D.I.Khan	285 km
SLM (Sialkot Lahore Motorway)	Lahore - Sialkot	91 km
SKR (Sialkot Kharian Motorway	Sialkot - Kharian	185 km
N-5 (A)	Khanewal - Lodran	98 km
N-10	Makola - Hub	493 km
N-25	Kalat - Uthal	433 km
N-30	Khuzdar - Basima	110 km
N-35	Hassanabdal - Khunjrab	806 km
N-50	Kuchlak - Zhob/D.I.Khan	531 km
N-55	Sarai Gambila - Kohat)	134 km
N-65	Sukkur - Quetta	385 km
N-70	Multan - Muzaffargarh/D.G.Khan	94 km
N-85	Hoshab - Surab	443 km
LKBR	Larkana Khairpur Bridge Road	56 km
LEB	Lahore Eastern Bypass	16 km
		4722 km

== Inspector Generals - NHMP ==
S. NO	Name	Tenure
01	Mr. Iftikhar Rashid	1 July 1997 - 16 April 2001
02	Mr. Asad Jehangir Khan	17 April 2001 - 18 January 2002
03	Mr. Zia ul Hassan Khan	19 January 2002 - 9 June 2005
04	Mr. Ahmed Nasim	20 July 2005 - 28 December 2006
05	Mr. Muhammad Raffat Pasha	8 January 2007 - 1 January 2009
06	Khawaja Khalid Farooq, QPM	1 January 2009 - 26 February 2009
07	Mr. Wasim Kausar, Ph.D.	27 February 2009 - 11 April 2011
08	Mr. Zafar ullah Khan, PPM BAR	11 April 2011 - 5 November 2011
09	Mr. Wajid Ali Khan, QPM, PPM	6 November 2011 - 25 May 2012
10	Mr. Zafar Abbas Lak	11 June 2012 - 17 June 2013
11	Mr. Zulfiqar Ahmed Cheema, TI	19 June 2013 - 31 December 2014
12	Mr. Muhammad Saleem Bhatti	5 January 2015 - 30 March 2016
13	Mr. Shaukat Hayat	30 March 2016 - 25 August 2017
14	Dr. Syed Kaleem Imam, TI, QPM, PPM, UNPM	25 August 2017 - 22 May 2018
15	Mr. Amjad Javed Saleemi	22 May 2018 - 14 June 2018
16	Mr. M. Aamir Zulfiqar Khan, QPM, PPM	27 June 2018 - 1 October 2018
17	Mr. Allah Dino Khawaja, PPM, BAR PSP	1 October 2018 - 24 February 2020
18	Dr. Syed Kaleem Imam, TI, QPM, PPM, UNPM	4 March 2020 - October 2021
19	Inam Ghani	October 2021-May 2022
20	Khalid Mehmood	10 May 2022- 15 March 2023
21	Sultan Ali Khawaja	15 March 2023- 13 January 2024
22	Mr. Salman Choudhry	16 January 2024 - 23 December 2024
23	Mr. Riffat Mukhtar Raja	23 December 2024 - 04 April 2025
24	Mr. B.A. Nasir, PSP	07 April 2025 - 30 November 2025
25	Mr. Sultan Ahmad Chaudhry, PSP	1 December 2025 – Present

== Recruitment and training ==
Before policing began on the M–2 (Islamabad – Lahore Motorway) in 1997, all officers were selected from existing police forces in the country, and an extensive training program was prepared to bring them up to international standards of motorway/expressway policing. Training was imparted by both local and foreign instructors. Local training was given at Police College Sihala. Experts from the UK and Nordic countries were invited to train officers, along with local experts, in advanced driving skills and the management of various types of incidents. A foreign training course was also conducted with South Wales Police, U.K. and the German Police in Kiel. In addition, the services of the armed forces were utilised for advanced driving training, particularly for motorcycles.

To impart customized training related to highways and motorways, NHMP has set up its own training college at Sheikhupura with the following mandate:

i) To train newly selected officers on the basic police course.

ii) To organize NHMP orientation training for already trained officers.

iii) To organize driving training for newly recruited officers.

iv) To organize advanced courses to train drivers as driving instructors.

v) To organize wireless training courses for wireless operators.

vi) To organize short courses on SOPs and the functioning of NHMP.

vii) To organize technical courses on the use of miscellaneous equipment (Provida, wireless sets, etc.).

viii) To organize courses on physical fitness.

ix) To organize a fire shooting course.

x) To organize a First Aid training course.

xi) To conduct promotional exams for different cadres.

xii) To conduct refresher courses for senior officers.

xiii) To act as a platform for the provision of training by foreign experts.

Since January 2006, the Training Institute has trained over 129 trainers in different categories. It has trained over 400 officers of Islamabad Model Traffic Police and 40 senior officers of Punjab Traffic Police as trainers for over 6000 newly recruited Traffic Wardens of Punjab Police. The institute has also conducted Lower Intermediate and Upper Class Promotion Courses, as well as short capacity-building courses such as orientation for deputationists, refresher courses for CPOs/Admin Officers, Moharrars, weapon handling and record keeping. It also conducted its 1st Commando Course on its own for about 27 officers, with 10 officers, including 4 women, taking paragliding courses.

Training strategy

Following a study of the current policing system and culture, a training strategy was devised to build a force that is honest, professional, dedicated and service- oriented. The main elements of the NHMP training strategy are:

• TNA to assess training needs • SWOT Analysis Training Techniques • Quality Instructors • Modern Techniques of Instruction 1.Syndicate/Participative System 2.Simulation Exercises 3.Case Studies 4.Driving Skills • Respectful Training Environment • Foreign Training

Selection criteria and requirements

SPO (Senior Patrolling Officer) 16 Graduation at least 2nd Division (Preferably Law) and LTV Driving Licence 20 Years to 27 Years 5' 8" for Male 5'4" for Female 33.5 to 35 with Expansion for Male only.

PO (Patrolling Officer) 14 Graduation at least 2nd Division and LTV Driving Licence 18 Years to 25 Years 5' 8" for Male 5'4" for Female 33.5 to 35 with Expansion for Male only.

APO (Assistant Patrolling Officer) 07 Intermediate, LTV Driving Licence, 03 Years driving experience 18 Years to 25 Years 5' 8" for Male 5'4" for Female 33.5 to 35 with Expansion for Male only.

JPO (Junior Patrolling Officer) 05 Matric, LTV Driving Licence, 03 Years driving experience 18 Years - 25 Years 5' 8" for Male 5'4" for Female 33.5 to 35 with Expansion for Male only.

Selection method

In all the above categories, candidates must go through a selection process. Candidates must:

• Submit a complete application.

• Pass the physical test, including running, height and chest measurements.

• Pass the written test.

• Pass the interview.

Selected candidates are examined for medical fitness. Physically and mentally fit candidates then proceed to National Highways & Motorway Police training.

== Equipment ==
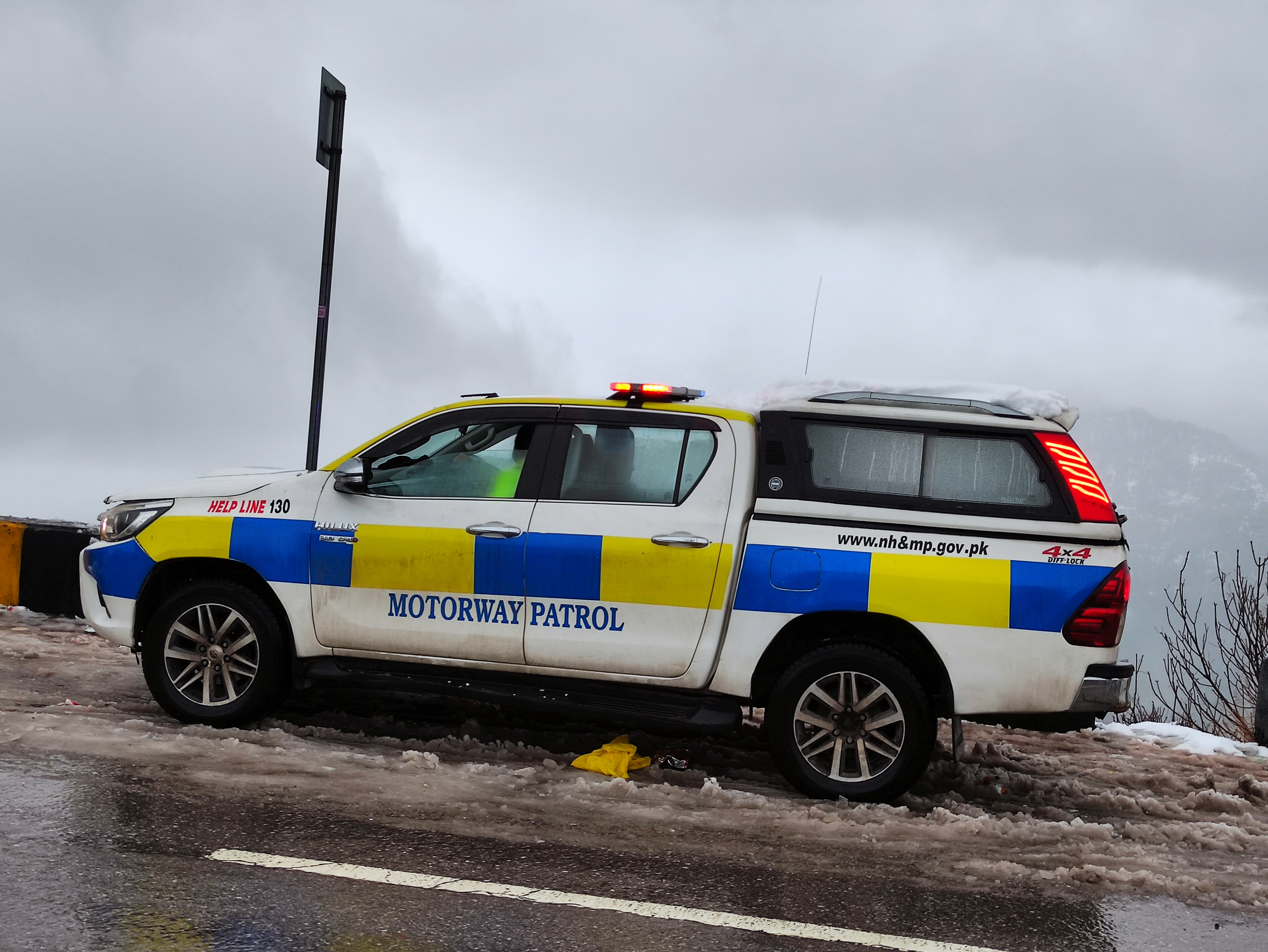
Toyota Hilux of Motorway Police in Murree

The NHMP patrolling and rescue vehicles include the Toyota Land Cruiser Prado, Toyota Corolla, Toyota Hilux, Toyota Fortuner, Toyota Hiace, Isuzu D-MAX, Mazda Trucks and Suzuki 500 and 750 CC motorcycles.

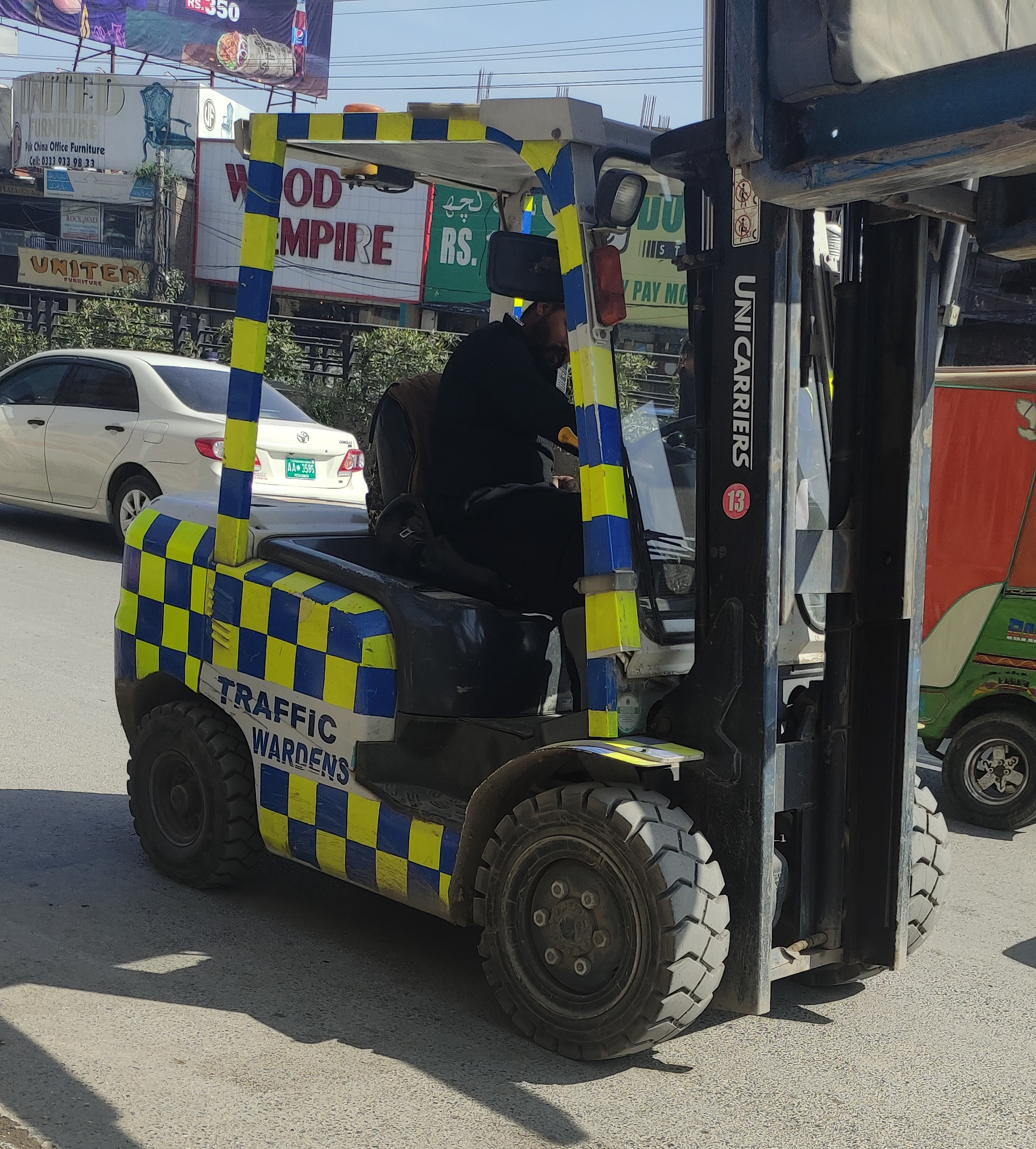
Fork Lifter of KPK Traffic Police

Equipment used by NHMP to curb traffic violations on National Highways & Motorways includes:

i) Provida 2000/Vascar: This radar is fitted with video and, in addition to detecting speed, has a printer that produces a picture of the vehicle along with details of the prescribed speed and the actual speed of the vehicle. This has helped NHMP prevent corruption and arguments between commuters and police officers.

ii) Hand Held Radar/Laser Gun: This gun- like radar is used to detect speed but cannot record it.

iii) Emergency/Accident: This includes emergency equipment and boards such as " Accident Ahead ", traffic diversion cones and cone lights, which are used to secure accident/incident areas both during the day and at night.

iv) Search Light: For surveillance at night, every vehicle is provided with a search light with a power of 400,000 C.P., which helps in detecting criminal activity and in responding to accidents and incidents at night.

v) Video/Still Camera: Each sector is provided with a video camera and a still camera in order to make video film and photographs of accident/incident areas.

vi) First Aid Boxes: NHMP is often the first to reach the site of an accident or incident. Its officers have been given specialised training to provide first aid to the injured on the spot.

vii) Communications System: NHMP uses wireless communication equipment operating through repeater- based/direct UHF and VHF.

viii) Weber Hydraulic Cutters: NHMP have procured 47 Weber hydraulic cutters as rescue equipment, used in accident management and the recovery of injured persons.

ix) Night Vision Speed Checking Devices: NHMP also use night vision speed checking devices.

== E Ticketing ==
The E- Ticketing project of the National Highways and Motorway Police was conceived and implemented by Syed Abbas Ahsan, DIG Police. The pilot project was initiated in collaboration with PITB in July 2015, and the first trials were conducted in August 2015. Following the trials, the system was expanded and implemented on all Motorways and National Highways on 25 January 2018. Ahsan received an appreciation letter from the Inspector General of Police, Dr. Syed Kaleem Imam, for the design and implementation of the system, and was nominated for a Civil Award.

E- Ticketing is a technology-based system in which patrol officers are equipped with a handheld device connected to a central data server. It enables officers to issue tickets to commuters on the spot, verify vehicle registration and licence information, and maintain a retrievable, geo-tagged record of rule violations. The system also documents road accidents, help provided to commuters and their feedback. In addition, it tracks and keeps a complete record of the performance of each officer, with timestamps and geo-tags. The capital and recurring costs of the system are lower than the cost of printing challan books under the paper- based ticketing system.

== See also ==
- Motorways of Pakistan
- National Highways of Pakistan
- Highway patrol
