= 92.4 FM =

FM radio frequency

The following radio stations broadcast on FM frequency 92.4 MHz:

== Bangladesh ==
- Radio Shadhin Music Radio Station in Dhaka.

== China ==
- CNR Music Radio in Yongzhou
- CNR The Voice of China in Kunming and Nanchong
- Radio Foshan Radio The South China Sea in Foshan

== Colombia ==
- Radio Policía Nacional in Bogotá

== Germany ==
- shared frequency of non-commercial radio stations in Munich, Bavaria

== Indonesia ==
- PAS FM in Jakarta (RDS: "PASFM_JKT")
- RRI Programa 2 Medan in Medan, North Sumatra

== Japan ==
- Radio Nippon at Yokohama

== Morocco ==
- Radio Plus Agadir at Agadir

== Singapore ==
- Symphony 924
