= National Police Bureau =

National Police Bureau (Urdu: قومی پولیس بیورو) is the premier police institution at the national level under Ministry of Interior, Pakistan. Police Order, 2002 further mandates the NPB to serve as a secretariat to the National Public Safety Commission (NPSC) and National Police Management Board (NPMB). In its later capacity, NPB acts as a national forum for all police organizations to provide policy inputs to the federal government on matters related to police, internal security, law & order and policing.

The Bureau was established in 1977 as Bureau of Police Research and Development (BPRD) until being renamed in 2001. It is headed by a Director General reporting to the Minister of Interior.

Main Functions of the Bureau:

- Police Reforms and Development
- Coordination regarding policing issues at national level
- Maintenance of National Crime Database
- Standardization among police organizations
- Research and analysis on policing, crime and law & order
- Promotion of Gender Responsive Policing
- Maintain Database of Trafficking in Persons (TIP)
- Selection of police officers for UN Peacekeeping missions
- Coordination with international organizations, foreign embassies on police related issues
- Processing cases of Police Awards (QPM/PPM)
- Authentication of Police Clearance Certificate for Spanish Embassy
- Processing of NOC for Procurement of Arms/Ammunition for LEAs

== See also ==
- Ministry of Interior, Pakistan
