= Islamabad Food Authority =

Government agency in Islamabad, Pakistan

- مقتدرہ خوراک اسلام آباد

Agency overview
- Formed: 2021
- Jurisdiction: Islamabad Capital Territory
- Headquarters: Islamabad, Pakistan

The Islamabad Food Authority (IFA) (Urdu: مقتدرہ خوراک اسلام آباد) is a government agency in Islamabad that is responsible for ensuring food safety and hygiene in the Islamabad Capital Territory (ICT). It was established under the Islamabad Food Safety Act 2021.

The IFA is in charge of overseeing and controlling various aspects of the food grain business in the Islamabad Capital Territory. This includes activities such as purchasing, storage, sales, transfer, milling, and quality control. The IFA ensures that these operations related to food grains are regulated and meet the required standards in terms of quality and safety.

== See also ==
- Punjab Food Authority
