= List of irredentist claims or disputes =

This is a list of irredentist claims or disputes. Irredentism is any political or popular movement that seeks to claim, reclaim and occupy a land that the movement's members consider to be a "lost" (or "unredeemed") territory from their nation's past. Not all territorial disputes are irredentist, although they are often couched in irredentist rhetoric to justify and legitimise such claims both internationally and within the country. What is and is not considered an irredentist claim is sometimes contentious.

== Current governmental irredentist claims ==
=== Argentina ===
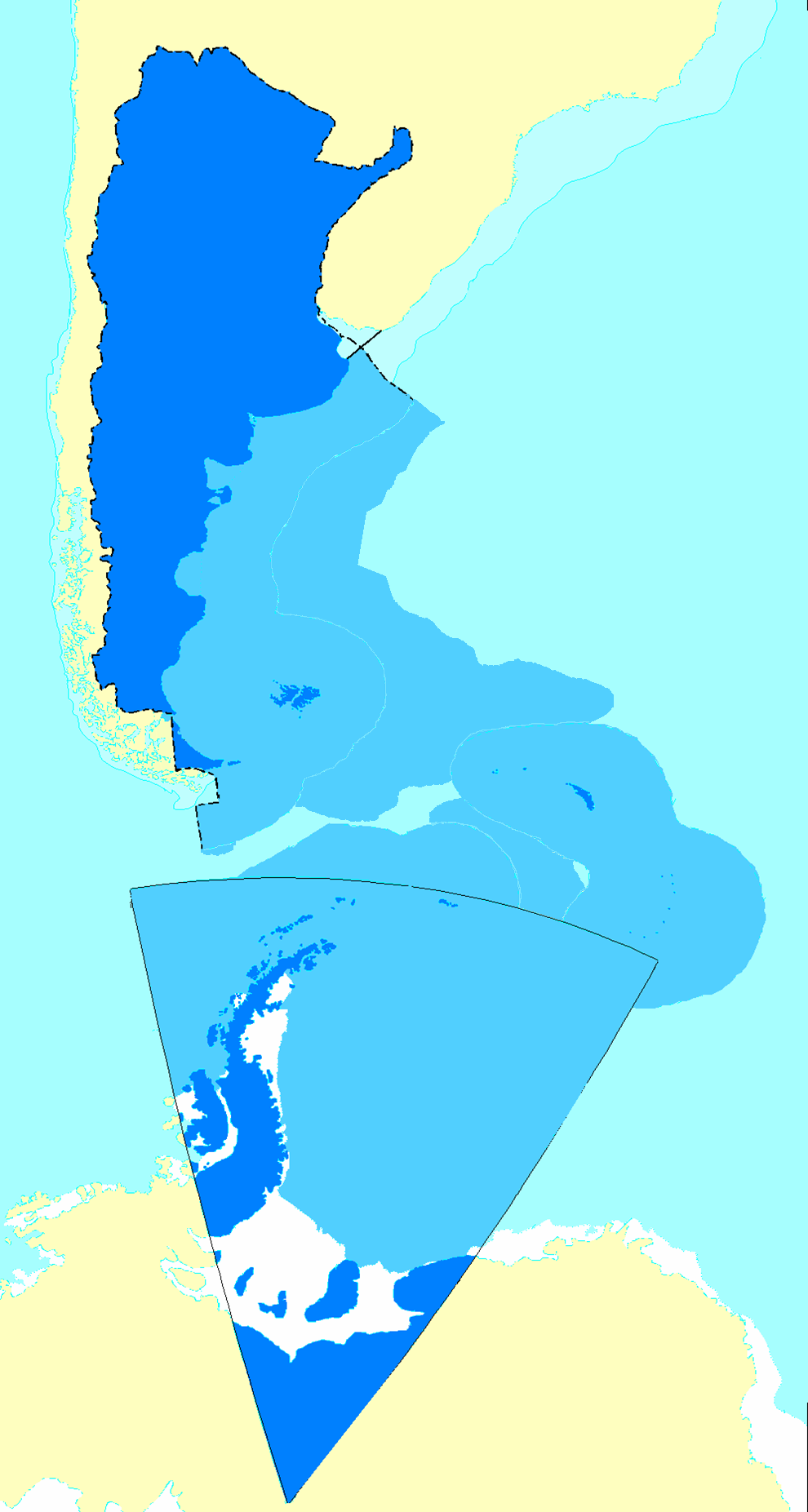
Argentina with all its territorial claims

Argentina has claimed land that used to be part of, or was associated with, the Spanish territory of the Viceroyalty of the Rio de la Plata. The viceroyalty began to dissolve into separate independent states in the early 19th century, one of which later became Argentina. The claims included, amongst other areas, parts of what in 2019 were Chile, Paraguay, Brazil, Uruguay, and Bolivia. Some of these claims have been settled, although others are still active. The active claims include part of the land border with Chile, a section of the Antarctic continent, and the British South Atlantic islands, including the Falklands.

Argentina renews these claims periodically. It considers the Falkland archipelago to be part of the Tierra del Fuego Province, along with South Georgia and the South Sandwich Islands. Its claim is included in the transitional provisions of the Constitution of Argentina as amended in 1994:

The Argentine Nation ratifies its legitimate and non-prescribing sovereignty over the Malvinas, Georgias del Sur and Sandwich del Sur Islands and over the corresponding maritime and insular zones, as they are an integral part of the National territory. The recovery of these territories and the full exercise of sovereignty, respecting the way of life for its inhabitants and according to the principles of international law, constitute a permanent and unwavering goal of the Argentine people.

=== Bolivia ===
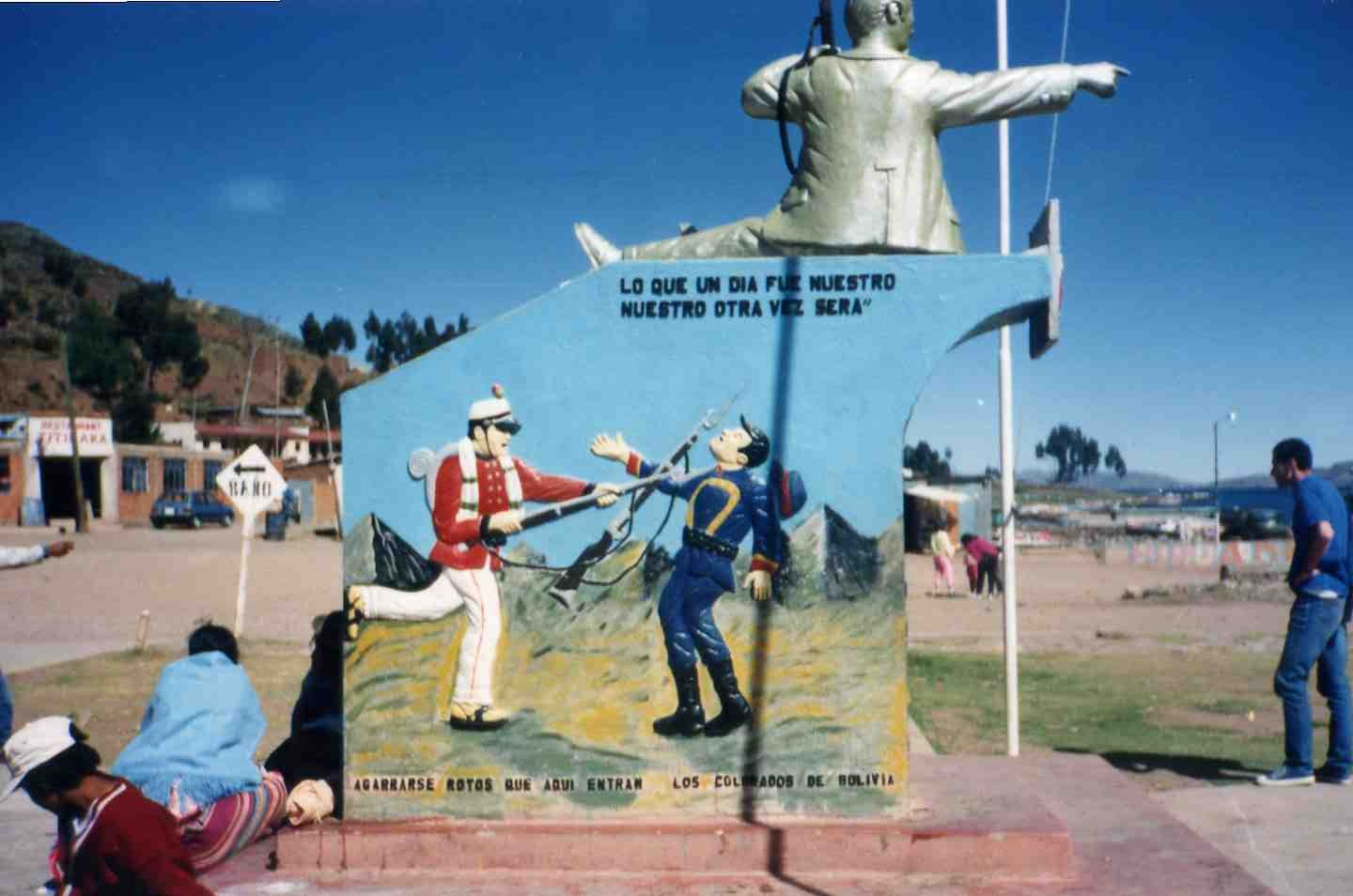
Bolivian irredentism over losses in the War of the Pacific (1879–1884): "What once was ours, will be ours once again", and "Hold on rotos (Chileans), because here come the Colorados of Bolivia"

The 2009 constitution of Bolivia states that the country has an "unrenounceable right over the territory that gives it access to the Pacific Ocean and its maritime space". Bolivia and Peru ceded land to Chile after the War of the Pacific, which left Bolivia as a landlocked country. The lost Atacama region is a source of conflict in the two countries' relations. Every year, Bolivians celebrate the Día del Mar (Day of the Sea) in observance of the lost territories.

=== China (PRC) ===
The preamble to the Constitution of China states, "Taiwan is part of the sacred territory of the People's Republic of China (PRC). It is the lofty duty of the entire Chinese people, including our compatriots in Taiwan, to accomplish the great task of reunifying the motherland." The PRC's claim to sovereignty over Taiwan is generally based on the theory of the succession of states, with the PRC claiming that it is the successor state to the Republic of China (ROC).

However, the People's Republic of China (PRC) has never controlled Taiwan. The ROC government formerly administered both mainland China and Taiwan but has been administering primarily Taiwan only, since the Chinese Civil War in which it fought the People's Liberation Army of the Chinese Communist Party. While the official name of the state remains the 'Republic of China', the country is commonly called 'Taiwan', as Taiwan makes up 99% of the controlled territory of the ROC.

=== China (ROC) ===
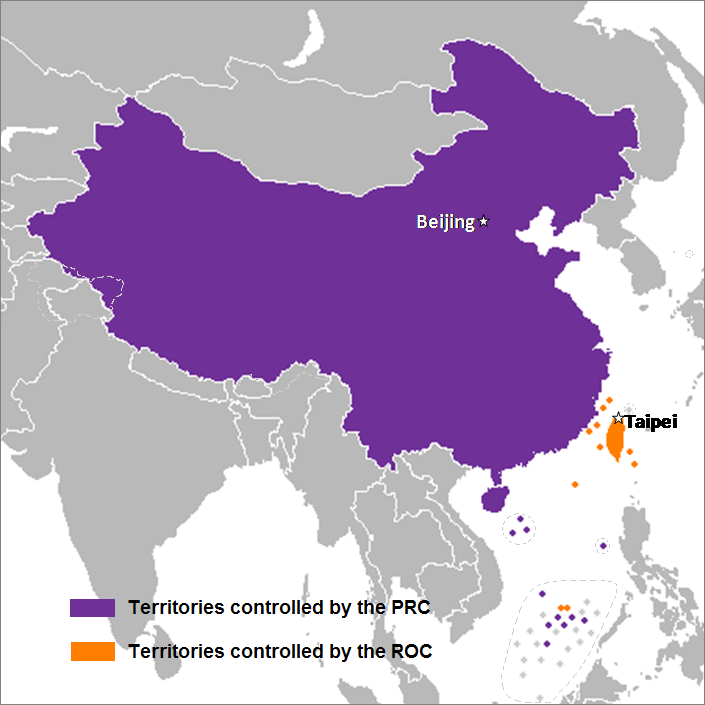
Territories controlled by the Republic of China (ROC) (orange) and the People's Republic of China (PRC) (purple).

The Qing dynasty of China ceded Taiwan and the Penghu Islands to the Empire of Japan in perpetuity in the Treaty of Shimonoseki in 1895, along with the Liaodong Peninsula. The Republic of Formosa was a short-lived republic that then existed on the island of Taiwan for about five months in 1895 in the period between the formal cession of Taiwan to the Empire of Japan and de facto Japanese occupation and control. Japan then established a colony on Taiwan that existed until control of Taiwan was ceded to the Nationalist Government of the Republic of China in 1945.

Article 4 of the Constitution of the Republic of China originally stated that "[t]he territory of the Republic of China within its existing national boundaries shall not be altered except by a resolution of the National Assembly". The National Assembly was de facto abolished in 2005, whose power was inherited by the Legislative Yuan. The Legislative Yuan holds the power to decide a referendum regarding changes to the ROC territory. Throughout the 1950s and 1960s, the Government of the Republic of China on Taiwan actively maintained itself to be the legitimate ruler of the entirety of China, including both mainland China, Taiwan, Tibet and Outer Mongolia. As part of its current policy of maintaining the 'status quo', the ROC has not renounced claims over the territories currently controlled by the PRC. According to ROC's Cross-Strait Act, Taiwan Area "refers to Taiwan, Penghu, Kinmen, Matsu, and any other area under the effective control of the Government" while mainland area "refers to the territory of the Republic of China outside the Taiwan Area". According to the Executive Yuan, mainland area specifically refers to "areas under control of the Chinese Communists", i.e., the PRC. However, the ROC does not actively pursue these claims in practice; the remaining claims that the ROC is actively seeking are of uninhabited islands: the Senkaku Islands, whose sovereignty is also asserted by Japan and is part of Ishigaki, Okinawa. As far as the Paracel Islands and Spratly Islands in the South China Sea are concerned, the Philippines, Malaysia, Brunei, and Vietnam have repeatedly claimed sovereignty over some or most of these islands, rejecting the Chinese claimed "Nine-dash line".

=== Comoros ===
Article 1 of the Constitution of the Union of the Comoros begins: "The Union of the Comoros is a republic, composed of the autonomous islands of Mohéli, Mayotte, Anjouan, and Grande Comore." Mayotte, geographically a part of the Comoro Islands, was the only island of the four to vote against independence from France (independence losing 37%–63%) in the referendum held 22 December 1974. Mayotte is currently a department of the French Republic.

=== Guatemala ===
Guatemala has claimed Belize in whole or in part since 1821.

=== Mauritius ===
Islands of the Republic of Mauritius labelled in black

In 1810, the British captured the Ile de France and renamed it Mauritius. By the Treaty of Paris of 30 May 1814, France ceded the Ile de France and all its dependencies (including the Chagos Archipelago) to the United Kingdom.

The Constitution of Mauritius states that the Outer islands of Mauritius includes the islands of Mauritius, Rodrigues, Agaléga, Cargados Carajos and the Chagos Archipelago, including Diego Garcia and any other island comprised in the State of Mauritius. The Government of the Republic of Mauritius has stated that it does not recognise the British Indian Ocean Territory (BIOT) which the United Kingdom created by excising the Chagos Archipelago from the territory of Mauritius prior to its independence, and claims that the Chagos Archipelago including Diego Garcia forms an integral part of the territory of Mauritius under both Mauritian law and international law.

Mauritius has claimed sovereignty over the Chagos Archipelago from Great Britain since 1968, but in 2025, Great Britain yielded to pressure from Mauritius, returning the Chagos Archipelago to the state of Mauritius.

=== India, Pakistan and China ===
Map showing disputed areas of India

Kashmir, a mountainous region spanning the northernmost tip of the Indian subcontinent, has been the subject of a territorial dispute between India and Pakistan since the partition of India in August 1947. In the face of a Pakistani invasion, the Kashmiri king Hari Singh signed the Instrument of Accession with India, bringing the country into a direct state of conflict with Pakistan in what would become the Indo-Pakistani War of 1947–1948. Since then, the two countries have fought multiple wars over the issue, but neither side has managed to capture and control the entire region. China became involved in the conflict in 1962, after consolidating control over what had been Indian-administered territory in Kashmir during the Sino-Indian War.

In practice, the zones of control in Kashmir remain divided into three disputed parts, with India and Pakistan separated by the Line of Control and India and China separated by the Line of Actual Control. India claims the entire region on the basis of the Instrument of Accession signed with Kashmir's king in 1947; Pakistan claims only the Indian-controlled parts of Kashmir, having signed the Sino-Pakistan Agreement in 1963; and China's claims are limited to parts of Indian-controlled territory, not including areas claimed by Pakistan. Official government maps of these countries generally reflect these territorial claims by including the disputed lands within their borders.

=== Israel and Palestine ===
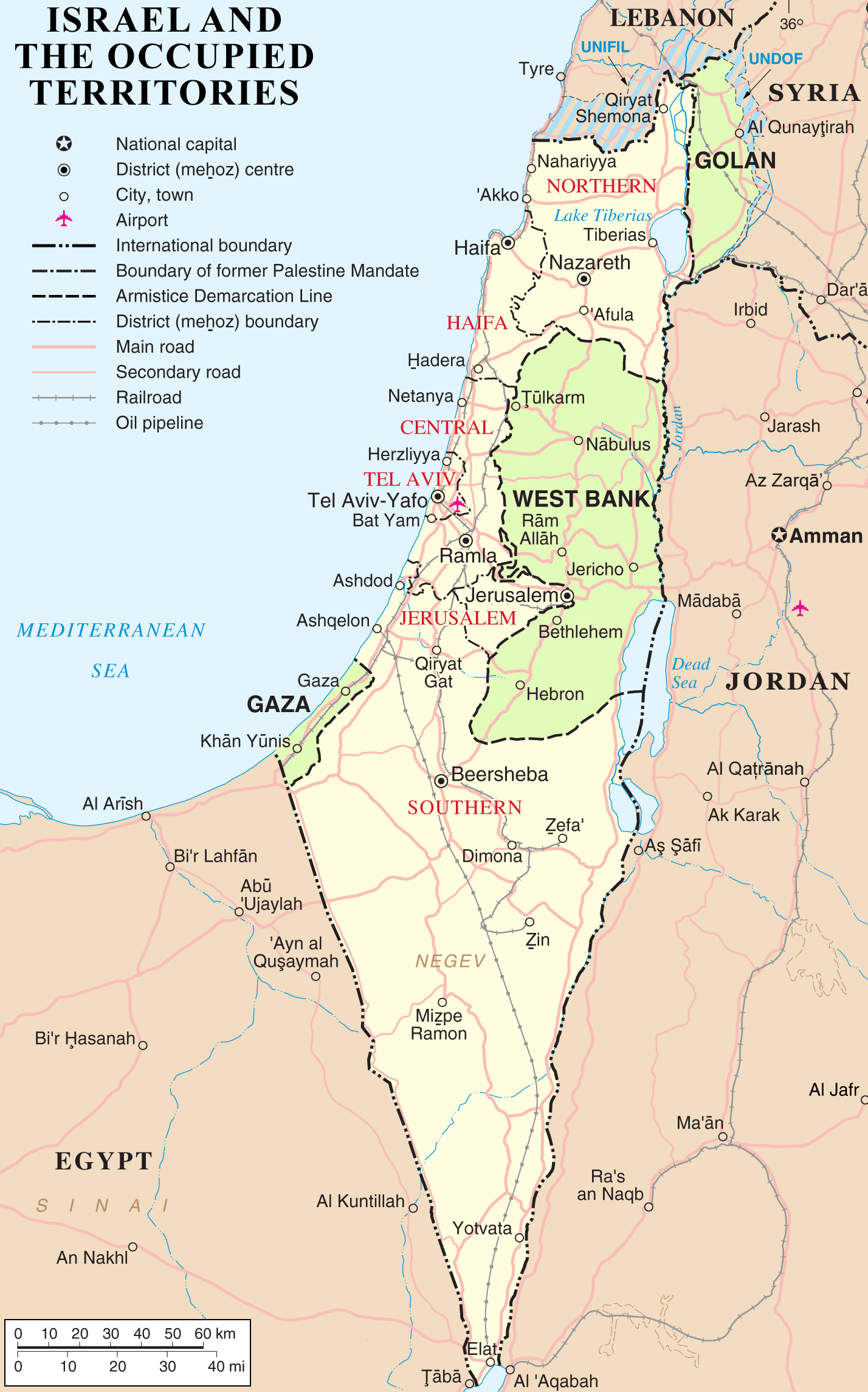
Israel and Israeli-occupied territories

In November 1947, the United Nations Partition Plan for Palestine was adopted with 72% in-favour votes, aiming to split the territory of the region into a Jewish state and an Arab state. However, this plan was never implemented—the Israeli Declaration of Independence had been rejected by the Arab League and ultimately led to the 1948 Palestine war. This war led to the emergence of three zones of control: Israel, an independent Jewish state; the West Bank, annexed by Jordan; and the Gaza Strip, occupied by Egypt. Israel's founding ideology, the Zionist movement, had claimed the territory as the Jewish homeland; these claims are based on the Jews' ancestral habitation and periodic sovereignty in the land as well as the cultural/religious significance of that region as expressed in the Hebrew Bible. The latter is particularly relevant to the Israeli claim to Jerusalem—Israel controlled only half of the city (West Jerusalem) after its independence, with the other half (East Jerusalem) coming under Jordanian control.

In a historical or religious context, many Jews commonly refer to the West Bank as Judea and Samaria (the biblical terms), which formed a large part of the ancient Kingdom of Israel. Following the outbreak of the Six-Day War in 1967, Israel captured the Jordanian-annexed West Bank and the Egyptian-occupied Gaza Strip, in addition to the Syrian Golan Heights and the Egyptian Sinai Peninsula. Since 1967, Israeli settlements have been established throughout these Israeli-occupied territories, which are regarded as having historical and religious significance to the Jewish people and strategic significance to the Israeli state. Israel withdrew from Gaza in 2005, but the Israeli occupation of the West Bank continues, though the Israeli government has never explicitly claimed sovereignty over any part of that territory apart from East Jerusalem, which it effectively annexed in 1967. The Israeli settlements in the West Bank and the Golan Heights, which were unilaterally annexed by Israel in 1981, are usually supported by the Israeli government and protected by the Israeli military, drawing condemnation from the international community as an obstacle to the Israeli–Palestinian peace process. Though the Gazan Israeli settlements were dismantled in 2005, Israel is still regarded as an occupying power over the Gaza Strip under international law and will remain accountable for the territory until the Egyptian–Israeli blockade of Gaza is lifted.

In 1980, Israel passed the Jerusalem Law, which declares "Jerusalem, complete and united" as the capital city of Israel, formalizing the 1967 effective annexation. Article 3 of the Basic Law of the Palestinian Authority, which was ratified in 2002 and which serves as an interim Palestinian constitution, declares that "Jerusalem is the capital of Palestine" despite the fact that the Palestinian Authority administers from Ramallah and specific "Areas" of the West Bank that were specified by the Oslo Accords. Since 2007, Hamas has administered the Gaza Strip, further isolating it from the West Bank and splitting the Palestinian territories between two separate governments. The Palestinian Authority claims the West Bank and the Gaza Strip (the "1967 borders") as the territory for an independent Palestinian state; Hamas, which does not recognize Israeli sovereignty, claims the entirety of the former British Mandate as the territory for an independent Palestinian state.

Since 1967, there has been support among right-wing Israelis for a potential Israeli annexation of the West Bank. The territory of Jordan has also been subject to irredentist claims by hardline Israelis seeing it as part of a "Greater Israel"; the country bordered the British Mandate as a British protectorate, known as the Emirate of Transjordan, until achieving independence in 1946. Jordan claimed sovereignty over the West Bank between 1950 and 1988, when this claim was renounced in light of the upcoming Israel–Jordan peace treaty.

=== Japan ===
Japan claims the four southernmost islands of the Russian-administered Kuril Islands, the island chain north of Hokkaido, annexed by the Soviet Union following World War II with the treaty of San Francisco. Japan also claims the South Korean-administered Liancourt Rocks, which are known as Dokdo in Korea and as Takeshima in Japan and have been claimed since the end of the Second World War.

=== Philippines ===
The Philippines claim portions of North Borneo as part of its territory, which is administered as part of Malaysia's Sabah state. The Philippines' irredentist claim is based on the disputed territory being formerly administered by the Sultanate of Sulu.

=== Russia ===
Russia promotes a claim on the territory of Ukraine, a place which Russian President Vladimir Putin describes as "essentially the same historical and spiritual space." This claim has also been explicitly described as "irredentist" by American commentators.

Russia also promotes claims to various post-Soviet states and militarily supports several breakaway polities in eastern Ukraine, eastern Moldova and northern Georgia.

- Ukraine (see 2014 pro-Russian unrest in Ukraine, All-Russian nation and 2022 Russian invasion of Ukraine)
  - Crimea (see Annexation of Crimea by the Russian Federation, Autonomous Republic of Crimea, 2003 Tuzla Island conflict)
  - Donbas (see 2022 Russian invasion of Ukraine)
    - Donetsk People's Republic (see 2022 Russian invasion of Ukraine, International recognition of the Donetsk People's Republic and the Luhansk People's Republic) – illegally annexed by Russia in October 2022
    - Luhansk People's Republic (see 2022 Russian invasion of Ukraine, International recognition of the Donetsk People's Republic and the Luhansk People's Republic) – illegally annexed by Russia in October 2022
- Belarus (see All-Russian nation)
- Moldova
  - Transnistria/Administrative-Territorial Units of the Left Bank of the Dniester (see Proposed Russian annexation of Transnistria)
- Georgia
  - Abkhazia
  - South Ossetia (see Proposed Russian annexation of South Ossetia)

=== Spain ===
Spain maintains a claim on Gibraltar, a British Overseas Territory near the southernmost tip of the Iberian Peninsula, which has been British since the 18th Century.

Gibraltar was captured in 1704, during the War of the Spanish Succession (1701–1714). The Kingdom of Spain formally ceded the territory in perpetuity to the British Crown in 1713, under Article X of the Treaty of Utrecht. Spain's territorial claim was formally reasserted by the Spanish dictator Francisco Franco in the 1960s and has been continued by successive Spanish governments. In 2002 an agreement in principle on joint sovereignty over Gibraltar between the governments of the United Kingdom and Spain was decisively rejected in a referendum. The British Government now refuses to discuss sovereignty without the consent of the Gibraltarians.

=== United States ===
Donald Trump, after becoming president of the United States in January 2025, has made various proposals regarding the enlargement of the United States. At various points in time, he has made suggestions to annex Canada, Mexico, Greenland, the Panama Canal and the Gaza Strip. In addition, key Trump ally Elon Musk suggested the United States could invade the United Kingdom, to "liberate the people of Britain from their tyrannical government".

On 7 January 2025, Canadian prime minister Justin Trudeau said there wasn't "a snowball's chance in hell" of Canada joining the United States. Polling of Canadians following the statements found 90% were against annexation. Mexican President Claudia Sheinbaum responded to the statements, saying "Mexico is a free, sovereign, and independent country, and we will always defend that." The Danish government repeatedly stated "Greenland is not for sale". Polling of Greenlanders suggested 85% were against annexation. Panamanian president José Raúl Mulino rejected Trump's claims about "retaking" the Panama Canal, stating "Every square meter of the Panama Canal and its adjacent area belong to Panama and will continue to be. The sovereignty and independence of our country are not negotiable." Trump's statements proposing to annex the Gaza Strip were widely condemned internationally, including by the UK, France, Saudi Arabia, Jordan, Egypt and Turkey, as well as by Palestinian leaders.

== Major non-governmental irredentist claims ==
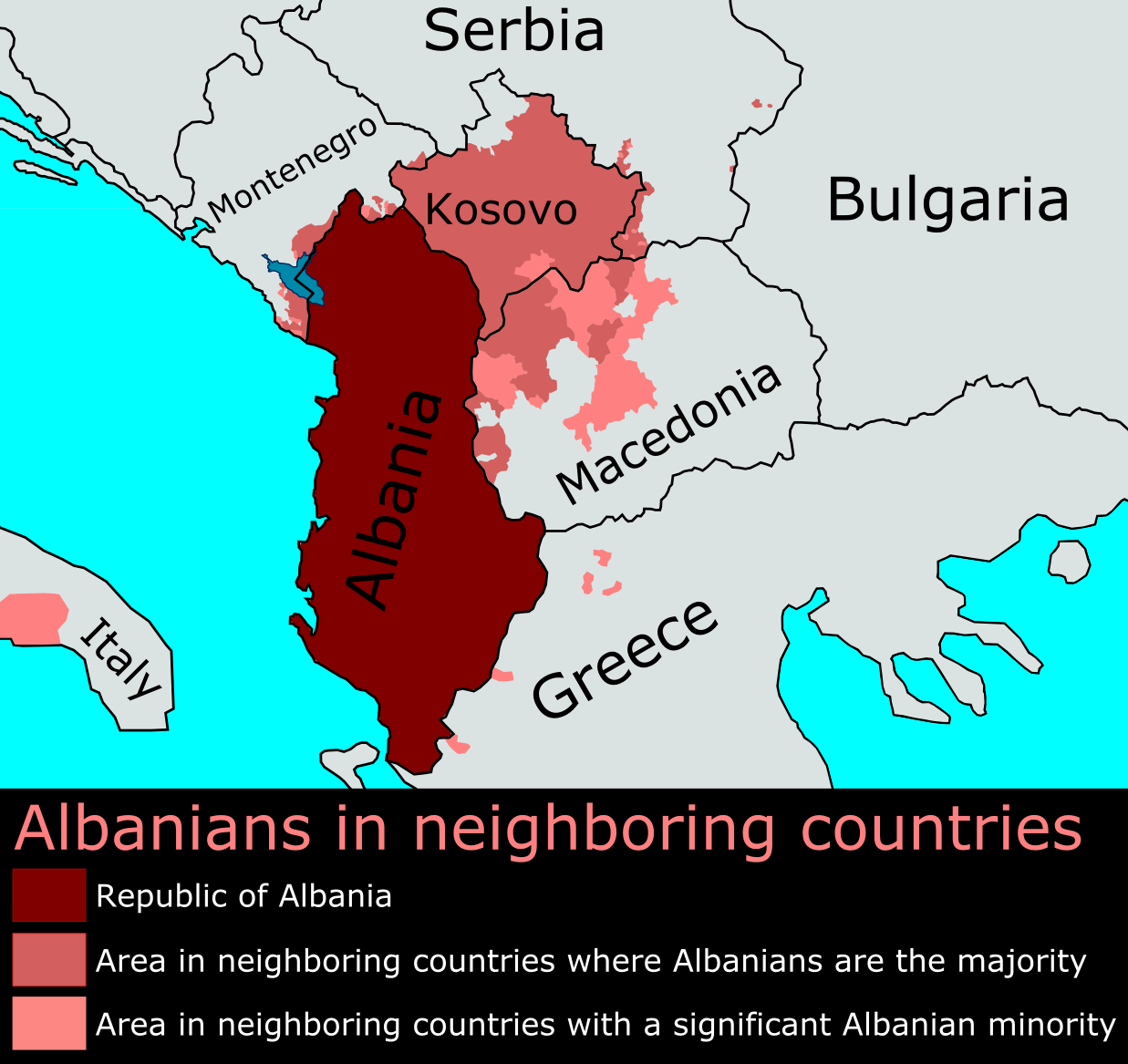
Distribution of Albanians in the Balkans

=== Albania ===
Greater Albania or Ethnic Albania as called by the Albanian nationalists themselves, is an irredentist concept of lands outside the borders of Albania which are considered part of a greater national homeland by most Albanians, based on claims on the present-day or historical presence of Albanian populations in those areas. The term incorporates claims to all of Kosovo, as well as territories in the neighbouring countries Montenegro, Greece, Serbia and North Macedonia. According to the Gallup Balkan Monitor 2010 report, the idea of a Greater Albania was supported by the majority of Albanians in Albania (63%), Kosovo (81%) and North Macedonia (53%).

In 2012, as part of the celebrations for the 100th Anniversary of the Independence of Albania, Prime Minister Sali Berisha spoke of "Albanian lands" stretching from Preveza in Greece to Preševo in Serbia, and from the Macedonian capital of Skopje to the Montenegrin capital of Podgorica, angering Albania's neighbours. The comments were also inscribed on a parchment that will be displayed at a museum in the city of Vlore, where the country's independence from the Ottoman Empire was declared in 1912.

=== Armenia ===
The situation in the Armenian-populated Nagorno-Karabakh region prior to the 2020 Nagorno-Karabakh war

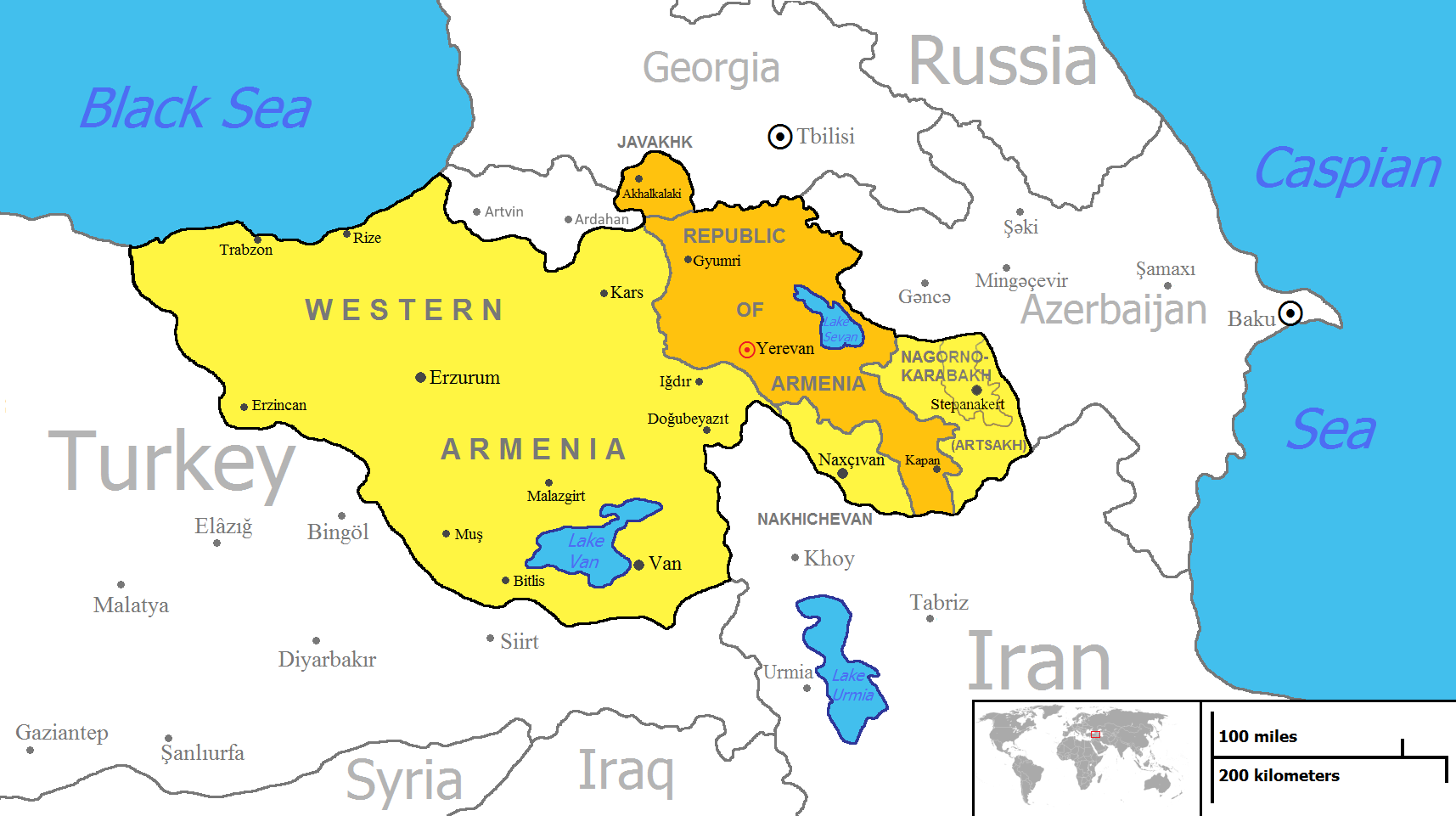
Borders of United Armenia

The concept of a United Armenia (classical Armenian: Միացեալ Հայաստան, reformed: Միացյալ Հայաստան, translit. Miatsyal Hayastan) refers to areas within the traditional Armenian homeland—the Armenian Highland—which are currently or have historically been mostly populated by Armenians. This incorporates claims to Western Armenia (eastern Turkey), Nagorno-Karabakh (Artsakh), the landlocked exclave Nakhchivan of Azerbaijan and the Javakheti region of Georgia. Nagorno-Karabakh and Javakheti are overwhelmingly inhabited by Armenians. Western Armenia and Nakhchivan had significant Armenian populations in the early 20th century, but no longer do. The Armenian population of eastern Turkey was almost completely exterminated during the genocide of 1915, when the millennia-long Armenian presence in the area largely ended and Armenian cultural heritage was largely destroyed by the Turkish government. The territorial claims to Turkey are often seen as the ultimate goal of the recognition of the Armenian genocide and the hypothetical reparations of the genocide.

=== Basque Country ===
Basque irredentism refers to the idea of uniting the Basque Country (greater region) into one single state. This movement claims the territories of Basque Country (autonomous community), Navarre and parts of Nouvelle-Aquitaine

=== Netherlands ===
Greater Netherlands is an irredentist concept which unites the Netherlands, Flanders, and sometimes Brussels.

Rattachism is a political ideology which calls for the French-speaking part of Belgium or Wallonia to secede from Belgium and become part of France.

=== Ireland ===
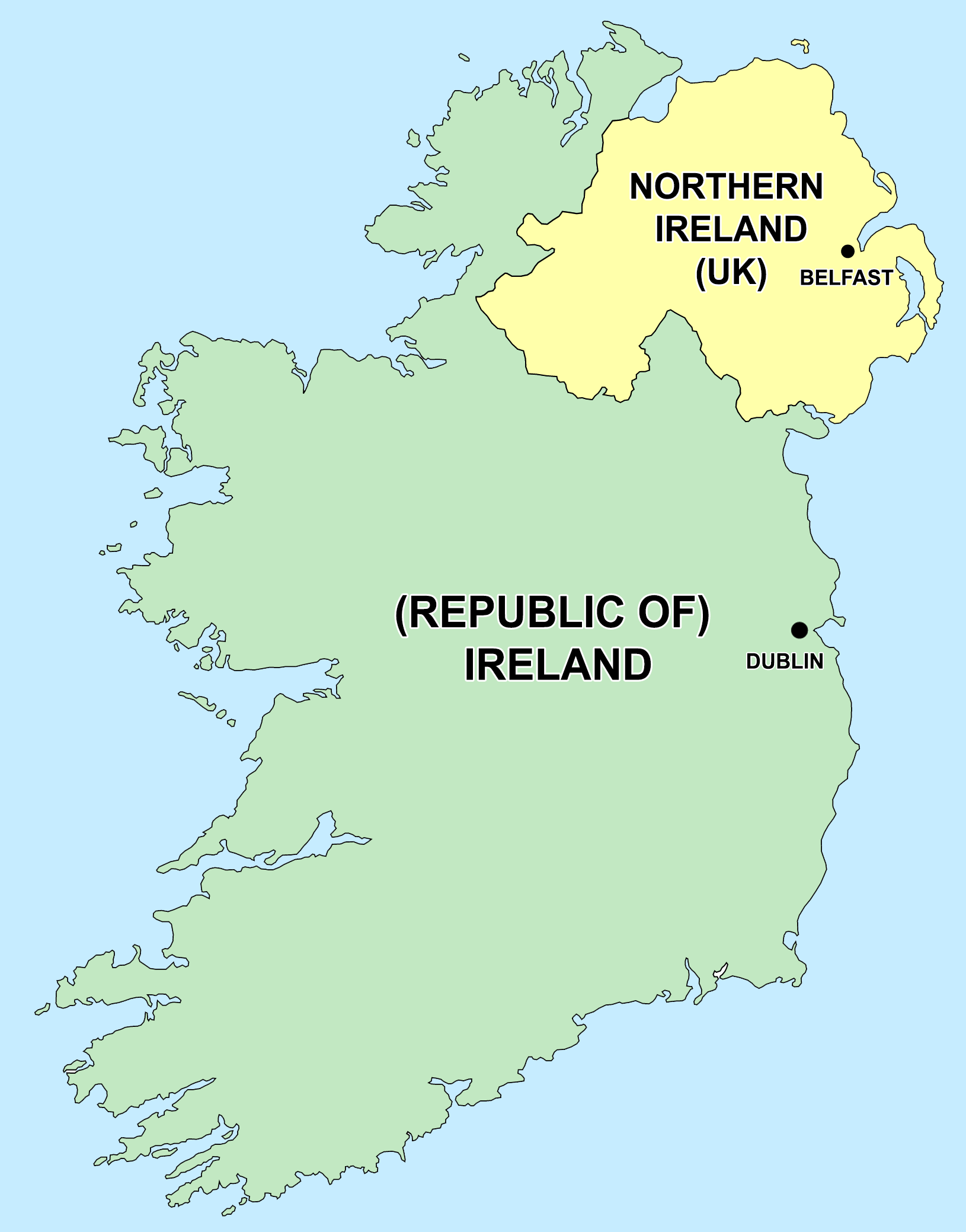
Political map of Ireland, showing the state of Ireland and Northern Ireland

The Irish Free State achieved partial independence with a dominion status under the British Empire in 1922. This state did not include Northern Ireland, which comprised six counties in the north-east of the island of Ireland which remained in the United Kingdom. When the Constitution of Ireland was adopted in 1937 it provided that the name of the state is Ireland; this is considered the time that the Republic of Ireland became a full-fledged independent nation. In the constitution Articles 2 and 3 provided that "[t]he national territory consists of the whole island of Ireland", while stipulating that "[p]ending the re-integration of the national territory", the powers of the state were restricted to legislate only for the area which had formed part of the Irish Free State. Arising from the Northern Ireland peace process, the matter was mutually resolved as part of the Good Friday Agreement in 1998. Ireland's constitution was altered by referendum and its territorial claim to Northern Ireland was removed.

The amended constitution asserts that while it is the entitlement of "every person born in the island of Ireland … to be part of the Irish Nation" and to hold Irish citizenship, "a united Ireland shall be brought about only by peaceful means with the consent of a majority of the people, democratically expressed, in both jurisdictions in the island". A North/South Ministerial Council was created between the two jurisdictions and given executive authority. The advisory and consultative role of the government of Ireland in the government of Northern Ireland granted by the United Kingdom, that had begun with the 1985 Anglo-Irish Agreement, was maintained, although that Agreement itself was ended. The two states also settled the long-running dispute concerning their respective names: Ireland and the United Kingdom of Great Britain and Northern Ireland, with both governments agreeing to use those names.

Under the Irish republican theory of legitimism, the Irish Republic declared in 1916 was in existence from then on, denying the legitimacy of either the state of Ireland or the position of Northern Ireland within the United Kingdom. Through much of its history, this was the position of Sinn Féin; however, it effectively abandoned this stance after accepting the Good Friday Agreement. Small groups which split from Sinn Féin continue to adopt this stance, including Republican Sinn Féin, linked with the Continuity IRA, and the 32 County Sovereignty Movement, linked with the Real IRA.

=== Switzerland ===
There have been many proposals for Switzerland to expand into neighboring countries.

A poll by ORF radio in October 2008 reported that about half of the population of Vorarlberg would be in favour of joining Switzerland.

In the Swiss parliament, a 2010 motion was submitted by Jurassian representative Dominique Baettig and co-signed by SVP party chairman Toni Brunner. The motion proposed to offer territories adjacent to Switzerland the "Swiss model of sovereignty" as an alternative to a "creeping accession" of Switzerland to the "centralist" European Union. As possible candidates for accession, the motion named Alsace (France), Aosta (Italy), South Tyrol (Italy), Jura (France), Vorarlberg (Austria), Ain (France), Savoy (France), Baden-Württemberg (Germany), Varese (Italy), Como (Italy) "and others". The motion was widely seen as anti-EU rhetoric rather than a serious proposal. In a statement of 19 May 2010, the Swiss Federal Council recommended its rejection, describing the motion as a "provocation". It argued that its adoption would be considered an unfriendly act by the countries surrounding Switzerland, and that it would also be at odds with international law, which in the government's view does not provide for a right to secession except in exceptional circumstances. The topic attracted the attention of the European media. The media went on to report a high level of apparent popular support for joining Switzerland in the territories in question

=== Idaho ===
In the United States, there is a movement both inside and outside the Idaho state for the counties in east Oregon, east Washington and north California to join the state of Idaho. The movement mostly stems from the election results in those parts of commonly Democratic Washington, Oregon and California, since those areas predominantly vote Republican.

=== Occitania ===
Nationalists have laid claim on territories that have a Occitans minority and those include:

Aran valley, Nouvelle-Aquitaine (except French Basque Country and former Poitou-Charentes), Occitania (except Pyrénées-Orientales), Provence-Alpes-Côte d'Azur and Occitan Valleys

=== Peru ===
Following from his rejection of Peruvian nationalism, Antauro Humala has condemned Peru's present borders as colonial impositions. A common slogan of his ethnic nationalism is that Peruvian nationalism wants to "reclaim the word ‘Peru’" while his ethnic nationalism wants to reclaim "the concept of tawantinsuyo" (the Quechua name for the Inca Empire), because "as an ethnic nationalist, I cannot respect criollo borders...my ancestral homeland encompasses Tucumán all the way to Pasto. We are a single people disseminated amongst various criollo states".

Antauro calls the Andeans countries and regions "the Inkan International" ("La Internacional Inkaica"). The territorial views of ethnocacerists would expand Peru's population from around 30 million to over 100 million people.

Ethnocacerists supported Evo Morales's 2019 re-election and condemned his subsequent resignation and replacement as "fascist" and "neocolonialist".

=== Eritrea ===
The Agazian Movement is a far-right nationalist movement that emerged within the Eritrean diaspora around 2016. It seeks to establish a Tigrinyan Orthodox-Christian state in what is currently Eritrea and parts of Ethiopia particularly the Tigray region. The movement is characterized by its anti-Muslim rhetoric, militant politics, and its impact on the already divided Eritrean opposition.

The movement's primary objective is the establishment of an Agazian state that would unite Tigrinya-speaking Orthodox Christians from both Eritrea and the Tigray region in Ethiopia. This vision includes rejecting the current Eritrean state, which the Agazian Movement views as a product of colonialism. The movement's leaders advocate for the expansion of the nations territorial boundaries, arguing that they were artificially demarcated by colonial powers.

=== Lesotho ===
The Basotho Covenant Movement (BCM) is a Basotho political party with a nationalist and irredentist stance. Led by Ts'epo Lipholo, the party advocates for the annexation of the South African province of Free State into Lesotho, as well as parts of the provinces of Northern Cape, Mpumalanga and KwaZulu-Natal.

=== Balochistan ===
The Balochistan region is administratively divided among three countries, Pakistan, Afghanistan, and Iran. The largest portion in area and population is in Pakistan, whose largest province (in land area) is Balochistan. An estimated 6.9 million of Pakistan's population is Baloch. In Iran there are about two million ethnic Baloch, and a majority of the population of the Sistan and Baluchestan province, southern Kerman province, southern South Khorasan province and eastern Hormozgan province is of Baloch ethnicity. The Afghan portion of Balochistan includes the Chahar Burjak District of Nimruz Province, and the Registan Desert in southern Helmand and Kandahar provinces. The governors of Nimruz province in Afghanistan belong to the Baloch ethnic group. President Pervez Musharraf ordered military action that killed a tribal head from the Pakistani province of Balochistan in 2006 which led to an increase in insurgency.

The Balochistan region has also experienced a number of insurgencies with separatist militants demanding independence of Baloch regions in the three countries to form "Greater Balochistan". In Pakistan, insurgencies by separatist militants in Balochistan province have been fought in 1948, 1958–1959, 1962–1963 and 1973–1977, with a new ongoing low-intensity insurgency beginning in 2003. Historically, drivers of the conflict are reported to include "tribal divisions", the Baloch-Pashtun ethnic divisions, "marginalization by Punjabi interests", and "economic oppression". However, over the years, insurgency waged by separatist militants declined as result of crackdown by Pakistani security forces, infighting among the separatist militants and assassinations of Baloch politicians willing to take part in Pakistan's democratic process by the separatist militants. Separatist militants in Pakistan demand more autonomy and a greater share in the region's natural resources. The Baloch population in Pakistan has endured grave violations of human rights, which include extrajudicial killings, enforced disappearances, and torture. These actions are purportedly perpetrated by state security forces and their associates. In 2019, United States declared Baloch Liberation Army, one of the separatist militants fighting the government of Pakistan, a global terrorist group.

In Iran, separatist fighting has reportedly not gained as much ground as the conflict in Pakistan, but has grown and become more sectarian since 2012, with the majority-Sunni Baloch showing a greater degree of Salafist and anti-Shia ideology in their fight against the Shia-Islamist Iranian government. Sistan-Baluchestan, one of Iran's poorest regions, has long been plagued by unrest involving drug-smuggling gangs, rebels from the Baluchi minority and Sunni extremists.

=== England ===
Ideologically committed to English nationalism, the party previously called for England to become an independent state, thus leaving the United Kingdom. Since 2016, it has instead called only for the creation of a devolved English Parliament within a federal UK. It has also called for a referendum on whether Monmouthshire, a county presently recognised as being in Wales, should instead be classified as part of England. The party is Eurosceptic and endorsed Brexit.

=== Brittany ===
The Reunification of Brittany or Breton Reunification is a political movement to reunite the Loire-Atlantique department with the administrative region of Brittany, to form the entire cultural and historical region of Brittany. This reunification is considered by many Breton regionalists as a prerequisite for further Breton autonomy.

== Historical irredentist claims ==
=== Africa ===
Some Ethiopian nationalist circles claim the former Ethiopian province of Eritrea (internationally recognized as the independent State of Eritrea in 1993 after a 30-year civil war).

==== Horn of Africa ====
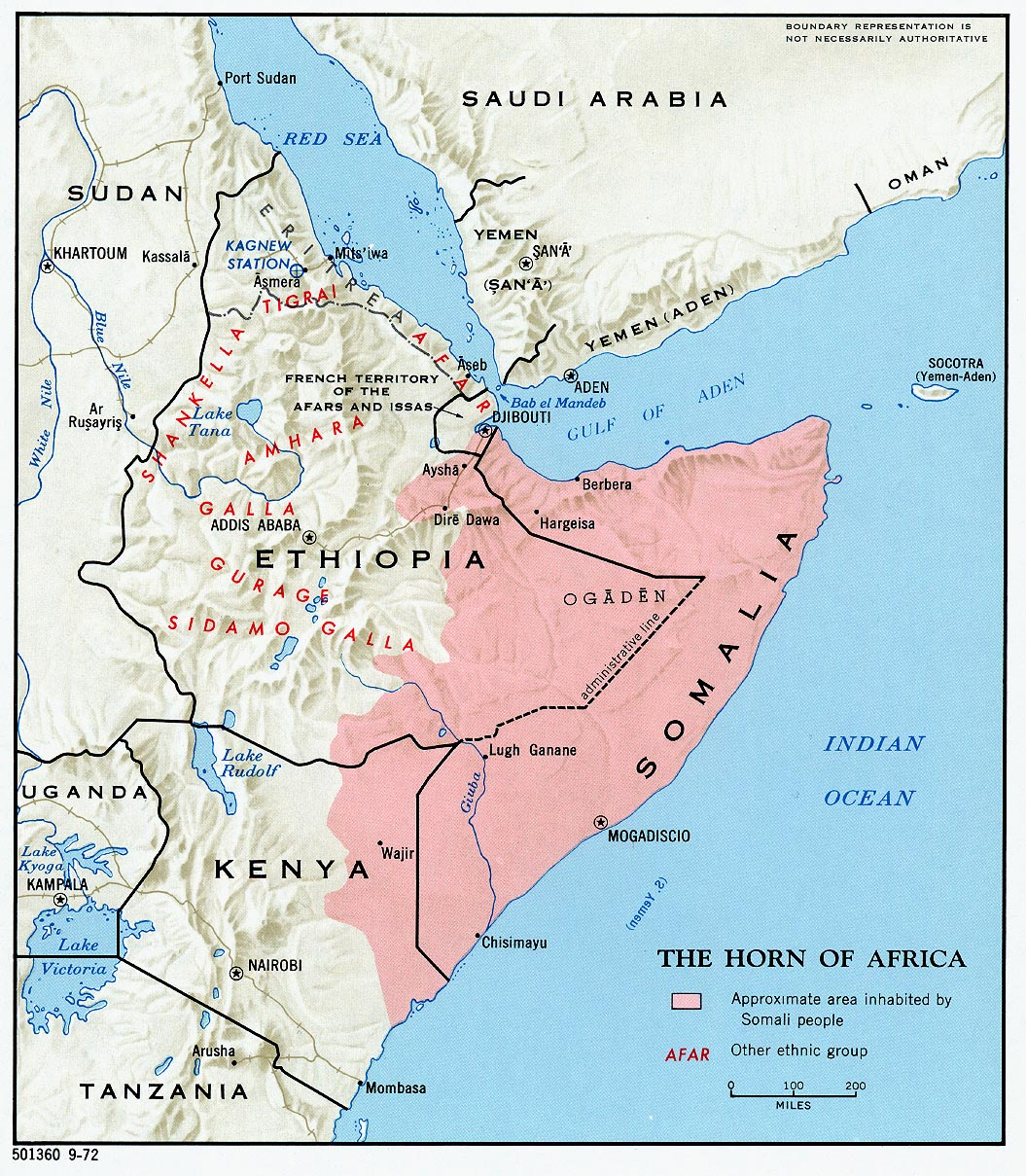
Estimated ethnic Somali territory in relation to neighbouring countries. The area is roughly coextensive with Greater Somalia.

Greater Somalia refers to the region in the Horn of Africa in which ethnic Somalis are and have historically represented the predominant population. The territory encompasses Somalia, Somaliland, the Somali region in Ethiopia, the North Eastern Province in Kenya and southern and eastern Djibouti. Ogaden in eastern Ethiopia has seen military and civic movements seeking to make it part of Somalia. This culminated in the 1977–78 Ogaden War between the two neighbours where the Somali military offensive between July 1977 and March 1978 over the disputed Ethiopian region Ogaden ended when the Somali Armed Forces retreated back across the border and a truce was declared. The Kenyan Northern Frontier District also saw conflict during the Shifta War (1963–1967) when a secessionist conflict in which ethnic Somalis in the Lamu, Garissa, Wajir and Mandera counties (all except Lamu formed part of the former North Eastern Province, abolished in 2013), attempted to join with their fellow Somalis in a "Greater Somalia". There has been no similar conflicts in Djibouti, which was previously known as the "French Somaliland" during colonisation. Here the apparent struggles for unification manifested itself in political strife that ended when in a referendum to join France as opposed to the Somali Republic succeeded among rumours of widespread vote rigging. and the subsequent death of Somali nationalist Mahmoud Harbi, Vice President of the Government Council, who was killed in a plane crash two years later under suspicious circumstances. Some sources say that Somalia has also laid a claim to the Socotra archipelago, which is currently recognized by the international community as part of Yemen, but occupied by the United Arab Emirates

Afar homeland refers to a creation of a homeland for the Afar people encompassing the Afar Region of Ethiopia, the Southern Red Sea Region of Eritrea and parts of Djibouti

==== North Africa ====
In North Africa, the prime examples of irredentism are the concepts of Greater Morocco and Greater Mauritania. While Mauritania has since relinquished any claims to territories outside its internationally recognized borders, Morocco continues to claim Western Sahara, which it refers to as its "Southern Provinces".

The “Unity of the Nile Valley” (Arabic: وحدة وادي النيل, romanized: wahda wadi al-nil), was a prominent anti-imperialist theme in Sudan and Egypt until the 1950s. Its ideologues did not postulate that Sudan and Egypt were one nation, but that they were two halves that had been unjustly separated but were destined to be reunited. For the Egyptians, sharing the river Nile made Sudan a natural appendix of Egypt, while for many Sudanese, Egypt was a “blood brother” with which they shared a set of fundamental national traits.

Despite the failure of earlier pro-unity attempts in the Sudan, the slogan gradually gained power until in 1953 the pro-unity political party won an overwhelming victory in the first self-government elections in the Sudan. Despite this, the Sudan soon declared its separate independence. Since then, union with Egypt has been discussed and proposed at various times, but has never regained its former relevance.

==== Southern Africa ====
Greater Eswatini includes much of the Mpumalanga Province of South Africa. King Mswati III of Eswatini set up the Border Restoration Committee in 2013 to negotiate restoration of the original borders.

Statesman Jan Smuts repeatedly had called for South African expansion since 1895, envisioning a future South African border along the river Zambesi or even the equator. German South-West Africa, Southern Rhodesia, and at least the southern parts of Portuguese Mozambique (especially the port of Lourenço Marques in the Delagoa Bay) along with the High Commission Territories (Basutoland, Bechuanaland and Eswatini, the last one having been a Transvaal protectorate from 1890–99) were to be included in this state, with Pretoria now being its geographical capital. Although the initial objective of Smuts' expansion plan was the Zambesi, he took great geopolitical interest in the East Africa Protectorate and Tanganyika. Smuts was impressed with the British colonists of the White Highlands and believed that the area could be transformed into a "great European state or system of states" in the near future, eventually leading to a "chain of white states which will in the end become one from the Union to Kenya". Smuts believed this expansion would finally lead South Africa to become "one of the greatest future Dominions of the Empire", the equal of Australia and Canada.

==== Central Africa ====
Bundu dia Kongo supports the creation of an ethnically-Kongo state with borders similar to the pre-colonial Kingdom of Kongo during the 15th century that would encompass parts of the modern-day Democratic Republic of the Congo, Angola, Gabon and the Republic of the Congo. Like the new religious movement Kimbanguism, BDK has mystical elements and claims independence leader Simon Kimbangu as their prophet, but Kimbanguist leaders have refused to recognize BDK as a religious movement.

==== Western Africa ====
The Ewe Unification Movement (French: Mouvement d'unification Ewe) was a series of west African ethno-nationalist efforts which sought the unification of the Ewe peoples spread across what are now modern Ghana and Togo. It emerged as a direct political goal around 1945 under the colonial mandate of French Togoland, however the ideal of unifying the group has been an identifiable sentiment present amongst the ethnicity's leadership and wider population ever since their initial colonial partitions by the British and German Empires from 1874 to 1884. While there have been many efforts to bring about unification, none have ultimately been successful due to both the platform itself often being a secondary concern for political leadership, or inter/intrastate conflicts overshadowing them.

=== Asia ===
==== Assyria ====
The Assyrian homeland is a geographic and cultural region situated in Northern Mesopotamia that has been traditionally inhabited by Assyrian people. The area with the greatest concentration of Assyrians on earth is located in the Assyrian homeland, or the Assyrian Triangle, a region which comprises the Nineveh Plains, southern Hakkari and the Barwari regions. This is where some Assyrian groups seek to create an independent nation state. The land roughly mirrors the boundaries of ancient Assyria proper, and the later Achaemenid, Seleucid, Parthian, Roman and Sassanid provinces of Assyria (Athura/Assuristan) that was extant between the 25th century BC and 7th century AD.

==== Caucasus ====
Irredentism is acute in the Caucasus region. The Nagorno-Karabakh movement's original slogan of miatsum ('union') was explicitly oriented towards re-unification with Armenia as to the pre-Soviet status, feeding an Azerbaijani understanding of the conflict as a bilateral one between itself and an irredentist Armenia. According to Prof. Thomas Ambrosio, "Armenia's successful irredentist project in the Nagorno-Karabakh region of Azerbaijan" and "From 1992 to the cease-fire in 1994, Armenia encountered a highly permissive or tolerant international environment that allowed its annexation of some 15 percent of Azerbaijani territory".

In the view of Nadia Milanova, Nagorno-Karabakh represents a combination of separatism and irredentism. However, the area has historically been Armenian, known as the Kingdom of Artsakh or Khachen. In July 1920, the 11th Soviet Red Army invaded and occupied the region and on 28 July, the decision to make Nakhchivan a part of modern-day Azerbaijan was cemented on 16 March 1921, in the Treaty of Moscow between Soviet Russia and the newly founded Republic of Turkey. Azerbaijan's irredentism, on the other hand, is quite explicit in official statements of the Azerbaijani officials by claiming the UN member-state Armenia as Azerbaijani territory despite the absence of historical evidence of Azerbaijan existing as a separate state up until 1918. On his official meeting in Gyanja on 21 January 2014, President Ilham Aliyev said, "The present-day Armenia is actually located on historical lands of Azerbaijan. Therefore, we will return to all our historical lands in the future. This should be known to young people and children. We must live, we live and we will continue to live with this idea."

===== Azerbaijan =====
Whole Azerbaijan is an irredentist concept of uniting presumed historically Azerbaijani-inhabited territories into Republic of Azerbaijan. Western Azerbaijan is an irredentist political concept that is used in Azerbaijan mostly to refer to Armenia. Azerbaijani statements claim that the territory of the modern Armenian republic were lands that once belonged to Azerbaijanis.

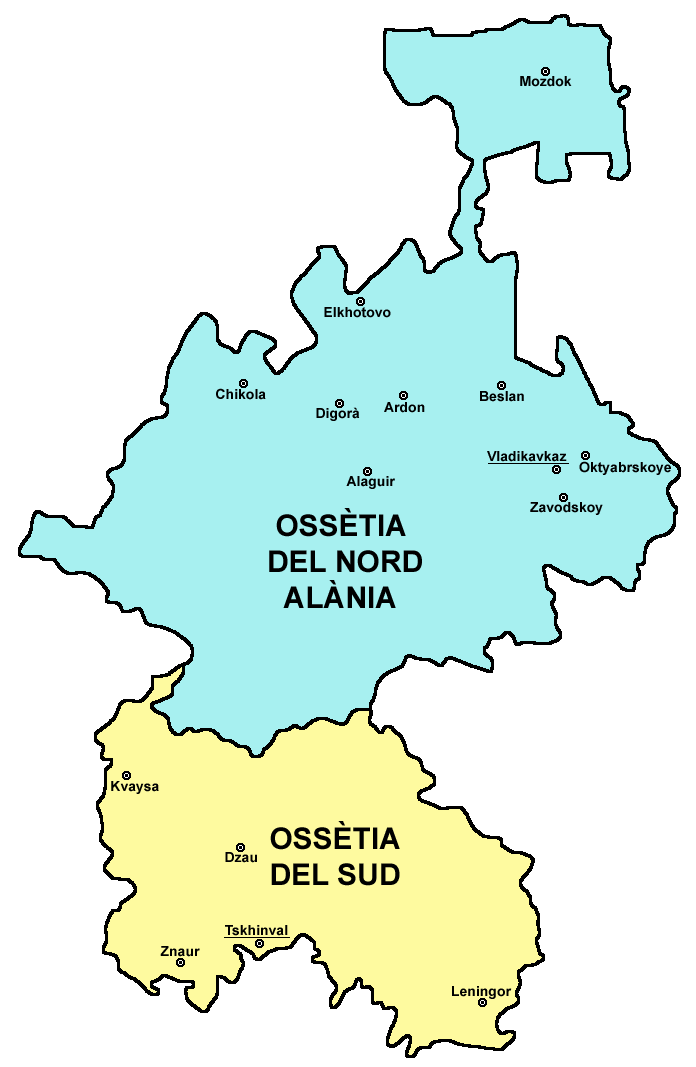
United Ossetia

===== Ossetia =====
The main Ossetian irredentist claim revolves around uniting the Russian Republic of North Ossetia and South Ossetia. Some Ossetian irredentists advocate for the republic to be part of the Russian federation, while others want Ossetia to be completely independent. Most noticeably, the South Ossetian president Alan Gagloev wanted to organize a referendum on joining Russian federation, which was cancelled in 2022. The claims of Ossetian nationalists often extend beyond the borders of two aforementioned republics, Trialeti and Kazbegi.

Ossetian irredentism has old roots and began in 1918 with the Georgian–Ossetian conflict of 1918–1920, which ended with the Georgian victory, and resurfaced in the South Ossetia war in early 1990-s, which led to the de facto independence of South Ossetia.

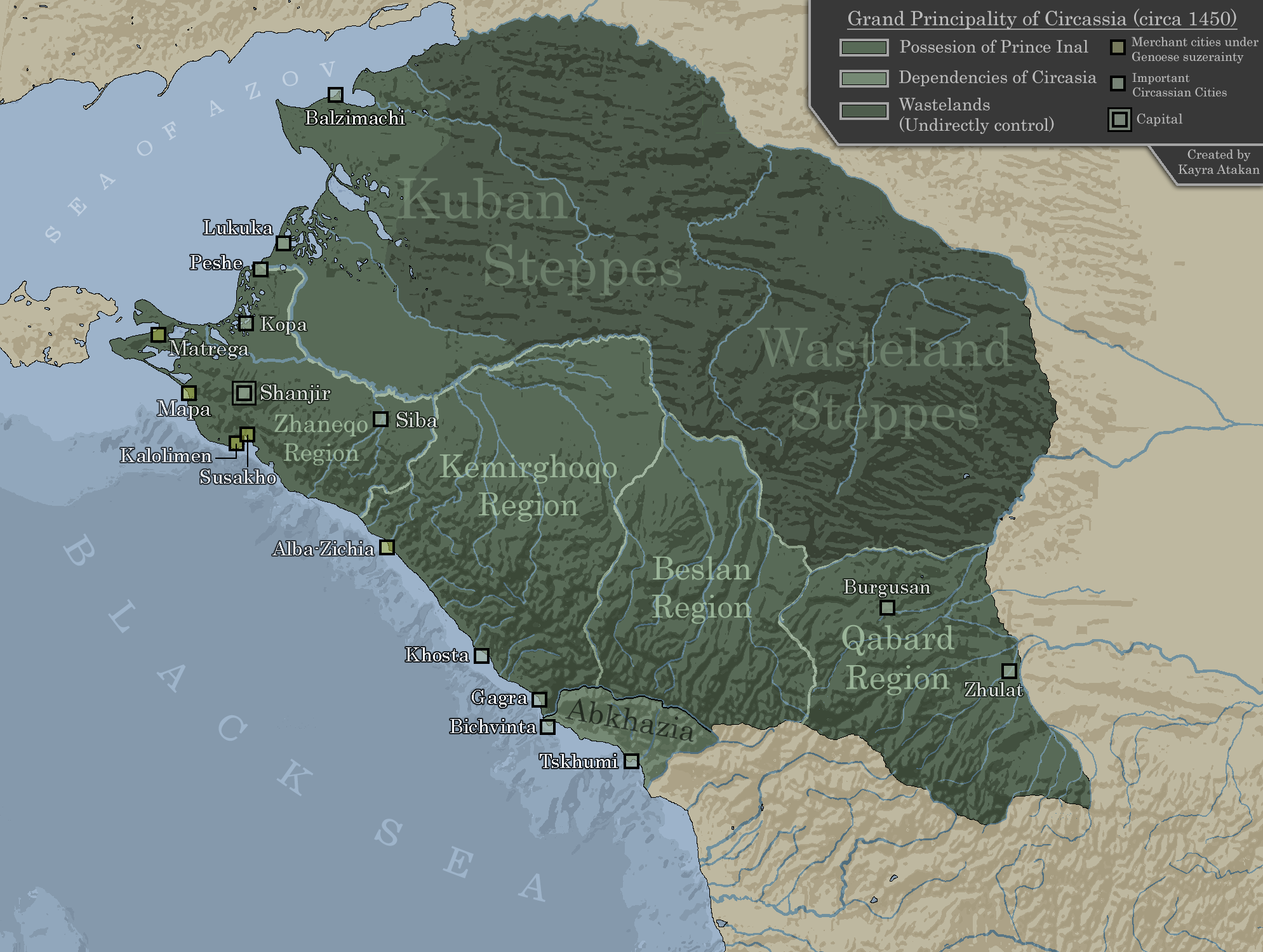
The map of Circassia during the Inal the Great, often used as a reference for the historical borders of Circassia.

===== Circassia =====
Due to the Circassian genocide, the majority of Circassians live outside of Circassia with only three semi-autonomous regions (Adyghea, Karachay-Cherkesia and Kabardino-Balkaria) in Russia, in only one of which Circassians constitute a majority (Kabardino-Balkaria). Circassian irredentism postulates the restoration of the whole Circassia either as a separate state or as a federal subject in Russia.

Circassian organisations differ on what result to achieve. Some Circassian organisations postulate the restoration of the borders of Circassia up to Don river, which will include entirety of Kuban, Stavropol Krai and all Circassian federal subjects, while some advocate only of the late border of Circassia ending on Kuban river.

==== Cambodia ====
The Cambodians hold a significant amount of hostility to Vietnam with regard to their loss of the Mekong Delta to the Vietnamese in history, and the subsequent enforced Vietnamization and conflicts which Vietnam repeatedly occupied the country, French favoritism to the Vietnamese, and the lack of cultural commonalities with Vietnam being part of the Sinosphere while Cambodia belongs to the Indosphere. This often drew Cambodian nationalist sentiments with the desire to reclaim territory from Vietnam. Both Lon Nol and Pol Pot utilized this grievance in order to spread Cambodian irredentism.

Currently, Cambodian irredentists still feel strongly attached to the region, and as a result, they believe it is a lost territory which should be returned to Cambodia. The expression of this sentiment has frequently ignited various protests, notably the 2013–2014 Cambodian protests, and Vietnam is frequently blamed for all of the turmoil and problems which occur within Cambodia, partly because Hun Sen is closely affiliated with Vietnam. This sentiment has sometimes driven Cambodia to forge close ties with China, a country which Vietnam has a strong feeling of enmity towards because it was ruled by China for over one thousand years.

In addition to the Mekong Delta, Cambodian nationalists seek to reclaim Phú Quốc, which Cambodians frequently call "Koh Trol", based on their belief that it was part of Cambodian territory before it was annexed by Vietnam, and it often attracts a number of Cambodian celebrities.

While tensions with Thailand are now receiving lesser attention, many Cambodians nonetheless have a long-standing hostility in regard to Thailand, because most of Thailand used to be under Khmer control until the rise of the Sukhothai Kingdom, and subsequent conflicts which started the demise of Cambodia as a regional power and repeated Thai occupations of Cambodia. Therefore, a strong anti-Thai sentiment developed in Cambodia fueled by a persistent historical misconception among educated Thais and the ruling class that distinguishes a so-called Khom ethnic group and Khmer as separate peoples—a distinct Thai narrative known only to Thais—perpetuated to mask the significant historical influence of the Khmer on Thai culture, thereby resulting in a form of historical negationism.

Cambodia and Thailand also engaged in border disputes from 2008 to 2011 with regard to Preah Vihear. Eventually, Cambodia acquired the temple following the dispute. There is also irredentism against Thailand with regard to Northern Khmer people, where Cambodians still see them part of Cambodian nation, and that lower part of northeastern Thailand should have been Cambodian.

Cambodian irredentism in Laos mainly focuses on the provinces of Champasak and Attapeu in Southern Laos. The unclear border delimitation between the two countries led to some sporadic tensions from 2017 to 2019. In 2019, Cambodia and Laos removed troops from the disputes area surrounding Stung Treng.

==== China ====
When Hong Kong and Macau were British and Portuguese territories, respectively, China considered these two territories to be Chinese territories under British and Portuguese administration. Therefore, Hong Kong people and Macau people descended from Chinese immigrants were entitled to Hong Kong Special Administrative Region passport or Macao Special Administrative Region passport after the two territories became special administrative regions. Similar claims are made by China on Arunachal Pradesh and Ladakh as part of Tibet, South China Sea, etc.

==== Georgia ====
Tao-Klarjeti was historically claimed by the Georgian Democratic Republic but is nowadays part of Turkey due to the Soviet-Turkish deal in 1921 From 1918 to 1920 both Democratic Republic of Georgia (DRG) and Azerbaijan Democratic Republic (ADR) claimed Saingilo as theirs, but the dispute never led to an armed confrontation

==== India ====
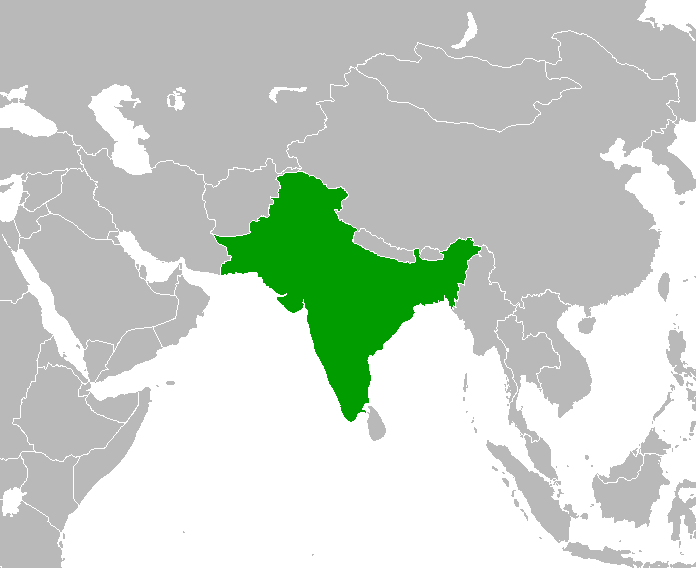
A map of India before the partition in 1947.

The call for creation of Akhand Bharat or Akhand Hindustan has on occasion been raised by some Indian right wing Hindutvadi cultural and political organisations, such as the Hindu Mahasabha, Rashtriya Swayamsevak Sangh (RSS), Vishwa Hindu Parishad, Bharatiya Janata Party (BJP). The name of one organisation sharing this goal, the Akhand Hindustan Morcha, bears the term in its name. Other major Indian non-sectarian political parties, such as the Indian National Congress, maintain a position against the partition of India.

There has been many armed irredentist movements in the region active for almost a century. Most prominent amongst them are the Naga fight for Greater Nagaland, the Chin struggle for a unified Chinland, the Sri Lankan Tamil struggle for a return of their state under Tamil Eelam and other self-determinist movements by the ethnic indigenous peoples of the erstwhile Assam both under the British and post-British Assam under India. Other such movements include the Beḻagāva border dispute on Maharashtra and Karnataka border with intentions to unite all Marathi speaking people under one state since the formation of the Karnataka state and dissolution of the bilingual Bombay state.

==== Indonesia ====
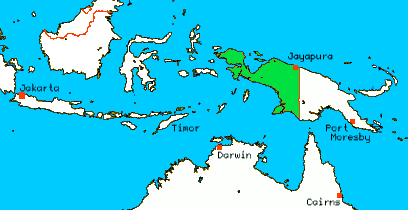
Western New Guinea was incorporated into Indonesia in 1969.

Indonesia claimed all territories of the former Dutch East Indies, and previously viewed British plans to group the British Malaya and Borneo into a new independent federation of Malaysia as a threat to its objective to create a united state called Greater Indonesia (Indonesian: Indonesia Raya). The Indonesian opposition of Malaysian formation has led to the Indonesia–Malaysia confrontation in the early 1960s. It also held Portuguese Timor (modern East Timor) from 1975 to 2002 based on irredentist claims.

The idea of uniting former British and Dutch colonial possessions in Southeast Asia actually has its roots in the early 20th century, as the concept of Greater Malay (Melayu Raya) was coined in British Malaya espoused by students and graduates of Sultan Idris Training College for Malay Teachers in the late 1920s. Some political figures in Indonesia including Mohammad Yamin and Sukarno revived the idea in the 1950s and named the political union concept as Greater Indonesia.

==== Iran ====
Pan-Iranism is an ideology that advocates solidarity and reunification of Iranian peoples living in the Iranian plateau and other regions that have significant Iranian cultural influence, including the Persians, Azerbaijanis, Ossetians, Kurds, Zazas, Tajiks of Tajikistan and Afghanistan, the Pashtuns and the Baloch of Pakistan. The first theoretician was Dr Mahmoud Afshar Yazdi.

The ideology of pan-Iranism is most often used in conjunction with the idea of forming a Greater Iran, which refers to the regions of the Caucasus, West Asia, Central Asia, and parts of South Asia that have significant Iranian cultural influence due to having been either long historically ruled by the various Iranian (Persian) empires (such as those of the Medes, Achaemenids, Parthians, Sassanians, Samanids, Timurids, Safavids, and Afsharids and the Qajar Empire), having considerable aspects of Persian culture in their own culture due to extensive contact with the various Empires based in Persia (e.g., those regions and peoples in the North Caucasus that were not under direct Iranian rule), or are simply nowadays still inhabited by a significant number of Iranic-speaking people who patronize their respective cultures (as it goes for the western parts of South Asia, Bahrain and China). It roughly corresponds to the territory on the Iranian plateau and its bordering plains. It is also referred to as Greater Persia, while the Encyclopædia Iranica uses the term Iranian Cultural Continent.

==== Iraq ====
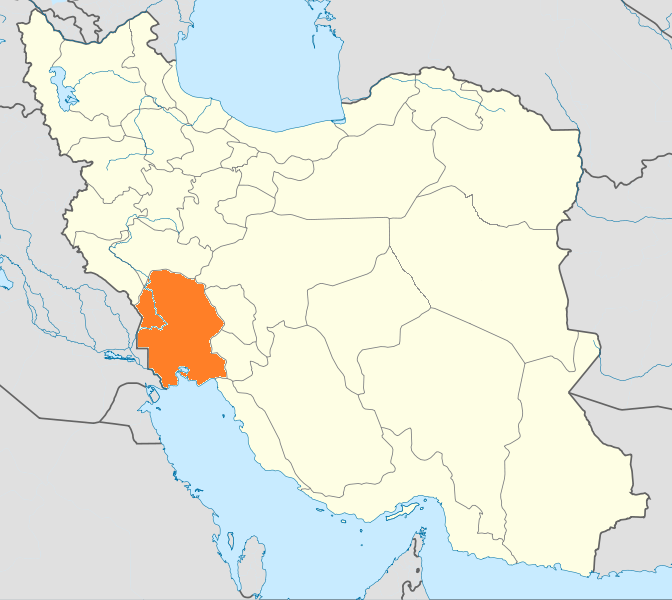
In the Iran–Iraq War (1980–1988), Saddam Hussein's Iraq claimed it had the right to hold sovereignty to the east bank of the Shatt al-Arab river held by Iran.

After gaining independence in 1932, the Kingdom of Iraq immediately declared that the Sheikhdom of Kuwait was rightfully a territory of Iraq, claiming it had been part of an Iraqi territory until being created by the British.

The Iraqi Republic under Abd al-Karim Qasim held an irredentist claim to Khuzestan. It also held irredentist claims to Kuwait.

Saddam Hussein's government sought to annex several territories. In the Iran–Iraq War, Ba'athist Iraq claimed it had the right to hold sovereignty to the east bank of the Shatt al-Arab river held by Iran. Iraq had officially agreed to a compromise to hold the border at the centre-line of the river in the 1975 Algiers Agreement in return for Pahlavi Iran to end its support for Kurdish rebels in Iraq. The overthrow of Mohammad Reza Pahlavi and the rise of Ruhollah Khomeini to power in the 1979 Iranian Revolution deteriorated Iran–Iraq relations and following ethnic clashes within Khuzestan and border clashes between Iranian and Iraqi forces, Iraq regarded the Algiers Agreement as nullified and abrogated it and a few days later the Iraqi Armed Forces launched a full-scale invasion of Iran that resulted in the Iran-Iraq War. In addition, Saddam supported the Iraq-based Ahwaz Liberation Movement and their goal of breaking their claimed territory of Ahwaz away from Iran, in the belief that the movement would rouse Khuzestan's Arabs to support the Iraqi invasion.

In the Gulf War, Iraq occupied and annexed Kuwait before being expelled by an international military coalition that supported the restoration of Kuwait's sovereignty. Saddam Hussein justified the Iraqi invasion of Kuwait in 1990 by claiming that Kuwait had always been an integral part of Iraq and only became an independent nation due to the interference of the British Empire. After annexing Kuwait, Iraqi forces amassed on the border with Saudi Arabia, with foreign intelligence services suspected that Saddam was preparing for an invasion of Saudi Arabia to capture or attack its oil fields that were a very short distance from the border. It has been suspected that Saddam Hussein intended to invade and annex a portion of Saudi Arabia's Eastern Province on the justification that the Saudi region of Al-Hasa had been part of the Ottoman province of Basra that the British had helped Saudi Arabia conquer in 1913. It is believed that Saddam intended to annex Kuwait and the Al-Hasa oil region, so that Iraq would be in control of the Persian Gulf region's vast oil production, that would make Iraq the dominant power in the Middle East. The Saudi Arabian government was alarmed by Iraq's mobilization of ten heavily armed and well-supplied Iraqi Army divisions along the border of Iraqi-annexed Kuwait and Saudi Arabia, and warned the United States government that they believed that Iraq was preparing for an immediate invasion of Saudi Arabia's Eastern Province. The Saudi Arabian government stated that without assistance from outside forces, Iraq could invade and seize control of the entire Eastern Province within six hours.

==== Israel ====
Greater Israel is an expression that has held several different biblical and political meanings over time. It is often used, in an irredentist fashion, to refer to the historic or desired borders of Israel. Currently, the most common definition of the land encompassed by the term is the territory of the State of Israel together with the Palestinian territories. An earlier definition, favored by Revisionist Zionism, included the territory of the former Emirate of Transjordan.

==== Kazakhstan ====
In Kazakhstan, nationalist circles often voice demands for the return of Orenburg (formerly the capital of the Kazakh (then Kyrgyz) ASSR in 1920) and the southern part of the Omsk Oblast and the Astrakhan Oblast.

==== Korea ====
The 1909 Gando Convention addressed a territory dispute between Qing China and Joseon Korea in China's favor. Because the convention was made by the occupying Empire of Japan, it was de jure nullified after the Surrender of Japan and North Korea started to control the area south of Paektu Mountain.

In 1961, the People's Republic of China published a map nominally claiming a boundary passing dozens of kilometers south of Paekdu Mountain. North Korea protested this by publishing a national map with claims on Gando. While neither of these claims was seriously enforced, the area between the Gando Convention line and Paektu Mountain were still in dispute. In 1963, North Korea signed a boundary treaty with the People's Republic of China, which settled the boundary between the two at the Yalu/Amnok (Chinese/Korean names) and Tumen Rivers; this agreement primarily stipulated that three-fifths of Heaven Lake at the peak of Mt. Baekdu would go to North Korea, and two-fifths to China.

In 1990, the Soviet Union and North Korea signed a border treaty recognizing Noktundo island, an island of historical significance in Joseon military history involving Admiral Yi Sun-sin, as a part of the Soviet Union and later Russia. South Korea does not recognize the treaty and maintains the nation's claim on the island administered by Russia.

While South Korea did not recognize this agreement, they made no serious attempts to gain Korean sovereignty on Gando. South Korea did not officially renounce their claim on Gando, but the Sino-Korean boundary on South Korean national map loosely follows the 1961 line except Mt. Baekdu, accepting the boundary on the map as the de facto boundary.

Some Koreans who maintain an irredentist claim on Gando regard Gando as Korean territory and the 1963 treaty as null and void. More ambitious claims include all parts of Manchuria that the Goguryeo kingdom controlled.

==== Lebanon ====
The Lebanese nationalism incorporates irredentist views seeking to unify all the lands of ancient Phoenicia around present day Lebanon. This comes from the fact that present day Lebanon, the Mediterranean coast of Syria, and northern Israel is the area that roughly corresponds to ancient Phoenicia and as a result the majority of the Lebanese people identify with the ancient Phoenician population of that region. The proposed Greater Lebanese country includes Lebanon, Mediterranean coast of Syria, and Northern Israel.

==== Malaysia ====
GAMPAR's platform was emphatically Malay-nationalist and Islamic. Its declared aim was the political liberation of the Pattani Malays from Thai rule, not on religious but on ethnic-national grounds. The 1948 letter of intent spoke of uniting “the four provinces of Pattani, Yala, Narathiwat and Satun as a Malay Islamic state”. It sought reincorporation of those provinces into British Malaya.

==== Mongolia ====
The irredentist idea that advocates cultural and political solidarity of Mongols. The proposed territory usually includes the independent state of Mongolia, the Chinese regions of Inner Mongolia (Southern Mongolia) and Dzungaria (in Xinjiang), and the Russian subjects of Buryatia. Sometimes Tuva and the Altai Republic are included as well.

==== Nepal ====
A irredentist concept in Nepal, which claims current Indian and Bangladeshi territories beyond Nepal's present-day boundaries. These claims typically include the areas controlled by Nepal between 1791 and 1816, a period that ended with the Anglo-Nepalese War and the signing of Sugauli Treaty. In addition, extensive territories in the present-day Indian states of Uttar Pradesh, Bihar, West Bengal and some parts of Bangladesh are also included in the claims of the activist organisation Greater Nepal Nationalist Front, which demands the "return" of these territories to Nepal.

==== Syria ====
The Syrian Social Nationalist Party, which operates in Lebanon and Syria, works for the unification of most modern states of the Levant and beyond in a single state referred to as Greater Syria. The proposed Syrian country includes Lebanon, Israel, Syria, Jordan, and parts of Turkey, and has at times been expanded to include Iraq, Cyprus, and the Sinai peninsula.

==== Tajikistan ====
several high-level Tajik politicians asserting the traditional claim to Bukhara and Samarkand, and Uzbek politicians asserting their right to protect Uzbeks living in Tajikistan.

==== Thailand ====
Thai irredentism in the 1940s.

Thailand allied with the axis powers in the 1940s in an attempt to "reclaim all of the former Thai lands." This was part of the Pan-Thai movement. The map depicts the occupation and annexation of the Cambodian territory (Nakhon Champassak, Phibunsongkhram, and Phra Tabong), Shan territory (Saharat Thai Doem), Laos territory (Lan Chang) and Malay territory (Si Rat Malai).

==== Turkey ====
Misak-ı Millî is the set of six important decisions made by the last term of the Ottoman Parliament. Parliament met on 28 January 1920 and published their decisions on 12 February 1920. These decisions worried the occupying Allies, resulting in the de jure Occupation of Constantinople by the British, French and Italian troops on 16 March 1920 and the establishment of a new Turkish nationalist parliament, the Grand National Assembly, in Ankara.

The Ottoman Minister of Internal Affairs, Damat Ferid Pasha, made the opening speech of parliament due to Mehmed VI's illness. A group of parliamentarians called Felâh-ı Vatan was established by Mustafa Kemal's friends to acknowledge the decisions taken at the Erzurum Congress and the Sivas Congress. Mustafa Kemal said "It is the nation's iron fist that writes the Nation's Oath which is the main principle of our independence to the annals of history." Decisions taken by this parliament were used as the basis for the new Turkish Republic's claims in the Treaty of Lausanne.

==== United Arab Emirates ====
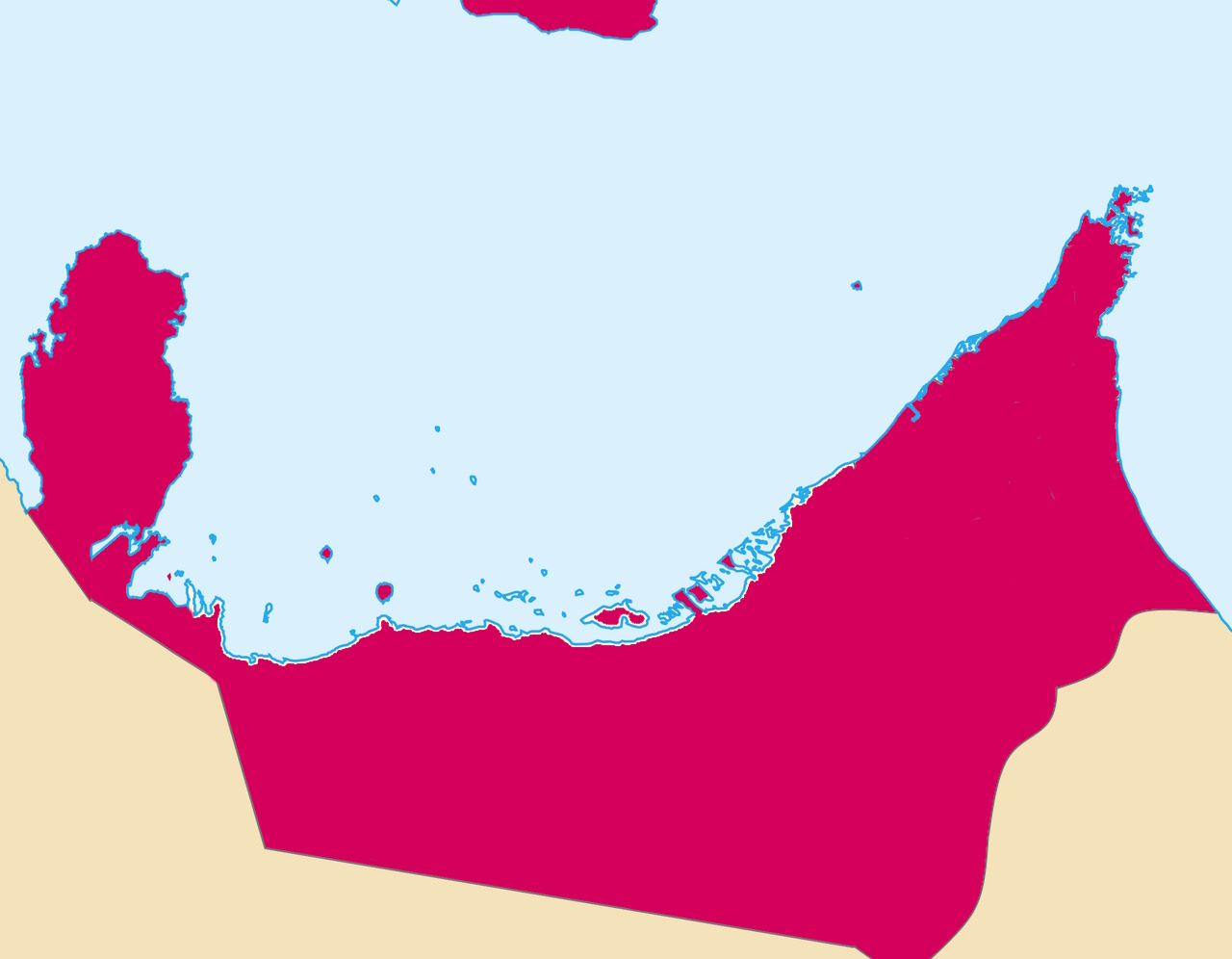
UAE historically claimed or occupied territories and land

The Greater and Lesser Tunbs as well as Abu Musa are disputed by the United Arab Emirates with Iran as well as the northern shores of Iran surrounding the heavily Arab south like place such as Bandar Lengeh and Bandar Abbas and as well as Qeshm Island and besides regions in Iran places like Musandam Peninsula were ruled by the maritime people of Al Qasimi until the war of 1819 when it was handed over to the Omani's as well as land in Oman's northern province and land along the Saudi border and places like Qatar first in 1867 and then in 1881 and more recently claims over Yemen regarding control of Socotra in 2018 also lead some to wonder if the UAE would continue on this path however they didn't.

==== Yemen ====
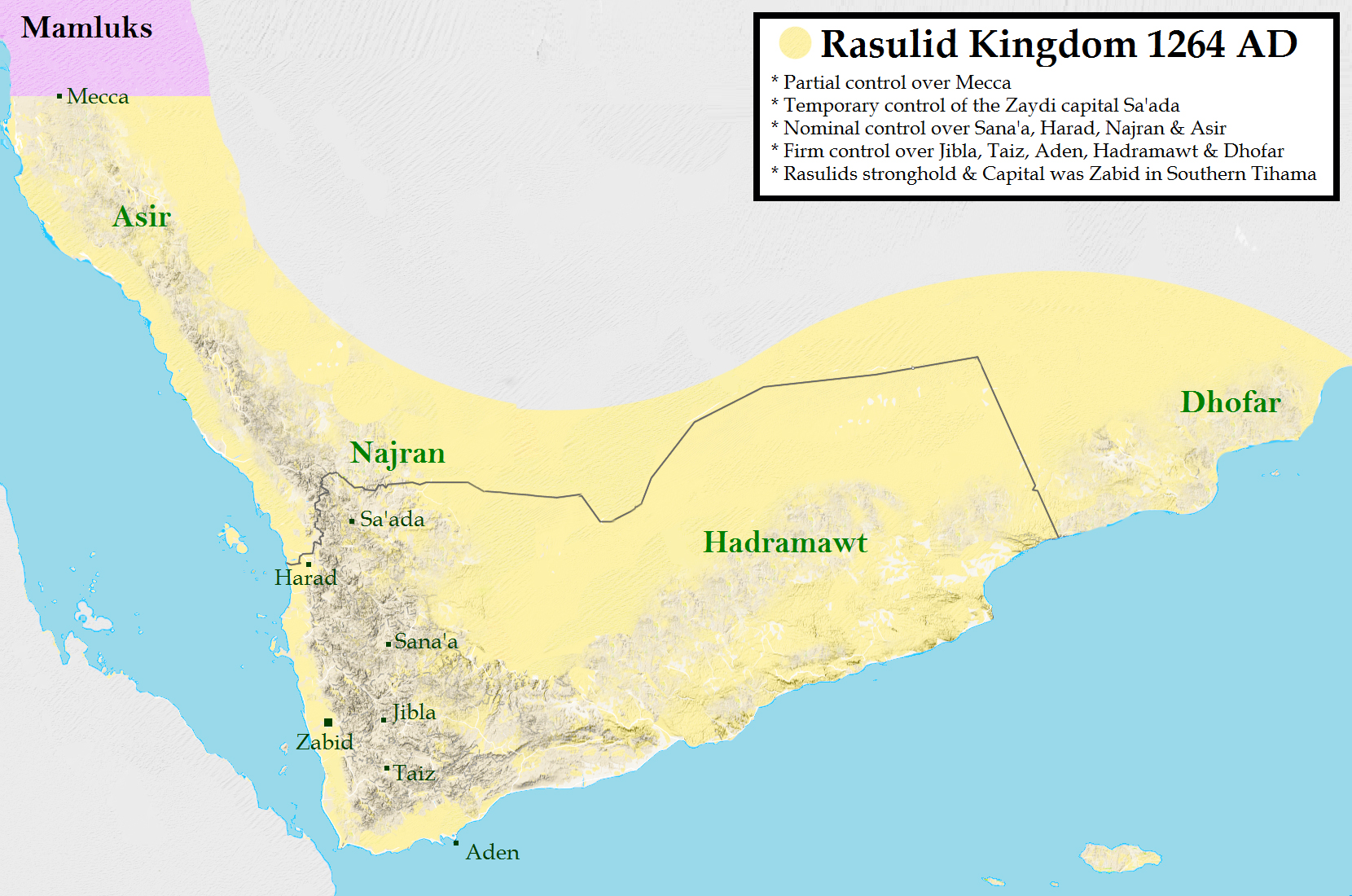
Rasulid Kingdom encompassing Greater Yemen around 1264 AD

Greater Yemen is a theory giving Yemen claim to former territories that were held by various predecessor states that existed between the Himyarite period and 18th century. The areas claimed include parts of modern Saudi Arabia and Oman.

=== Europe ===
==== Andalusia ====
LA was irredentist, advocating an expanded Andalusia comprising the current autonomous regions of Andalusia and Murcia, the Extremaduran province of Badajoz, the Sierra de Álcaraz in Castilla-La Mancha, the Portuguese Algarve and Gibraltar. LA was against the Capitulations of Granada and an alleged process of colonization of Andalusia by Spain.

==== Bavaria ====
Following the collapse of Austria-Hungary after World War I, proposals for Austria to join Bavaria were made. At this time the Bavarian government held particular interest in incorporating the regions of North Tyrol and Upper Austria into Bavaria.

==== Belarus ====
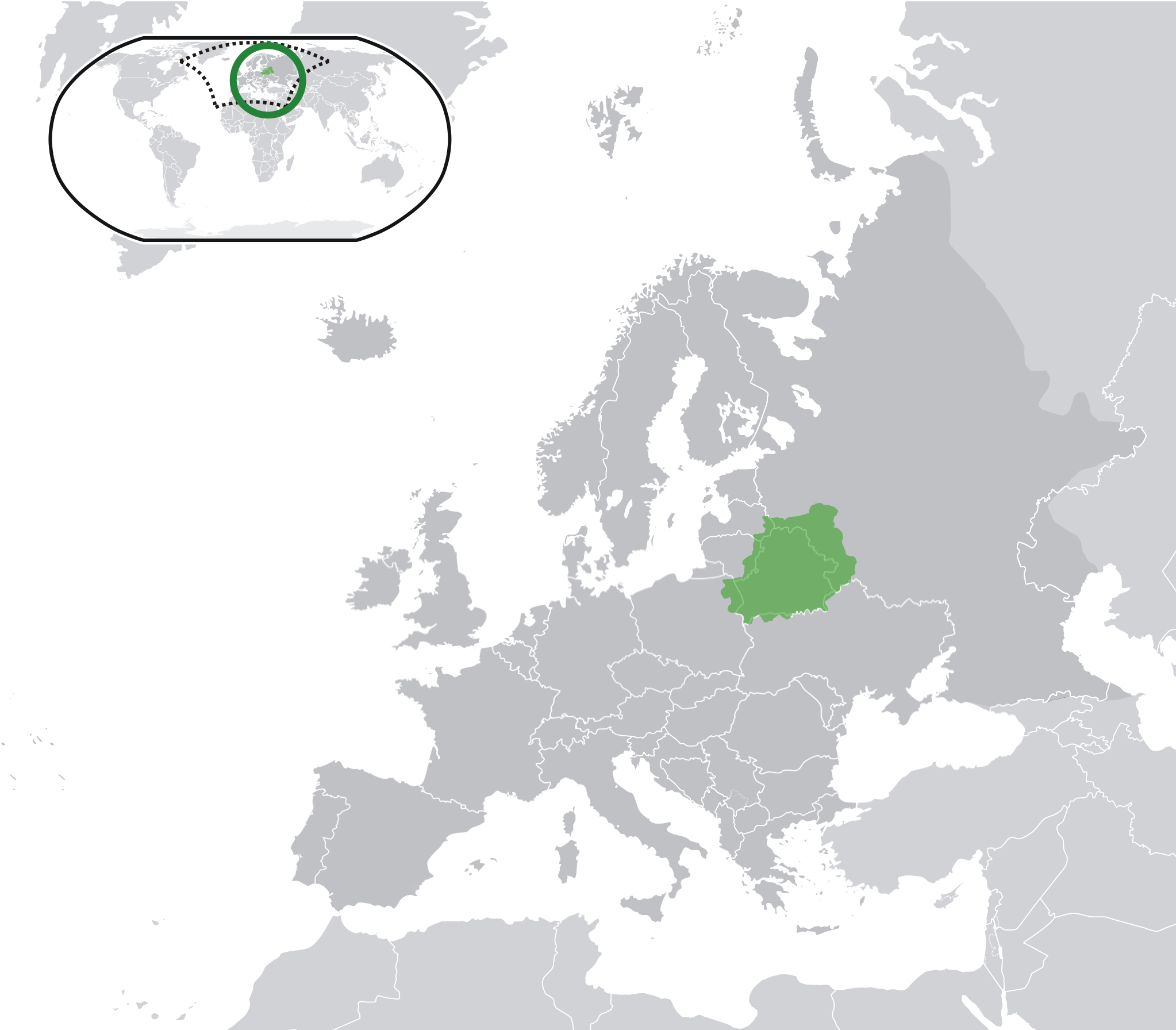
Claimed territories superimposed on modern borders

In its Third Constituent Charter, the following territories were claimed for BNR: Mogilev Governorate (province), as well as Belarusian parts of Minsk Governorate, Grodno Governorate (including Belastok), Vilna Governorate, Vitebsk Governorate, and Smolensk Governorate, and parts of bordering governorates populated by Belarusians.

==== Belgium ====
Greater Belgium is a Belgian irredentist concept which lays claim on territory nationalists deem as rightfully Belgian. It usually laid claim to: German territory historically belonging to the former Duchy of Limburg (Eupen-Malmedy), Dutch Limburg, Zeelandic Flanders, and the Grand Duchy of Luxembourg. To a lesser degree, they also claimed the Dutch province of North Brabant and the French Netherlands (Nord-Pas-de-Calais). Shortly after the Belgian Revolution, some groups even proposed a Belgo-Rhine federation.

==== Bosnia and Herzegovina ====
A irredentist concept seeking the enlargement of Bosnia and Herzegovina. It is more popular among ethnic Bosniaks, as Bosnian Croats more commonly support the creation of a separate Croat entity in Bosnia and Herzegovina or integration into Croatia while Bosnian Serbs prefer to side with a possible secession of Republika Srpska or its merger with Serbia. Bosniak irredentism often endorses the annexation of the region of Sandžak, where a Bosniak community lives.

==== Bulgaria ====
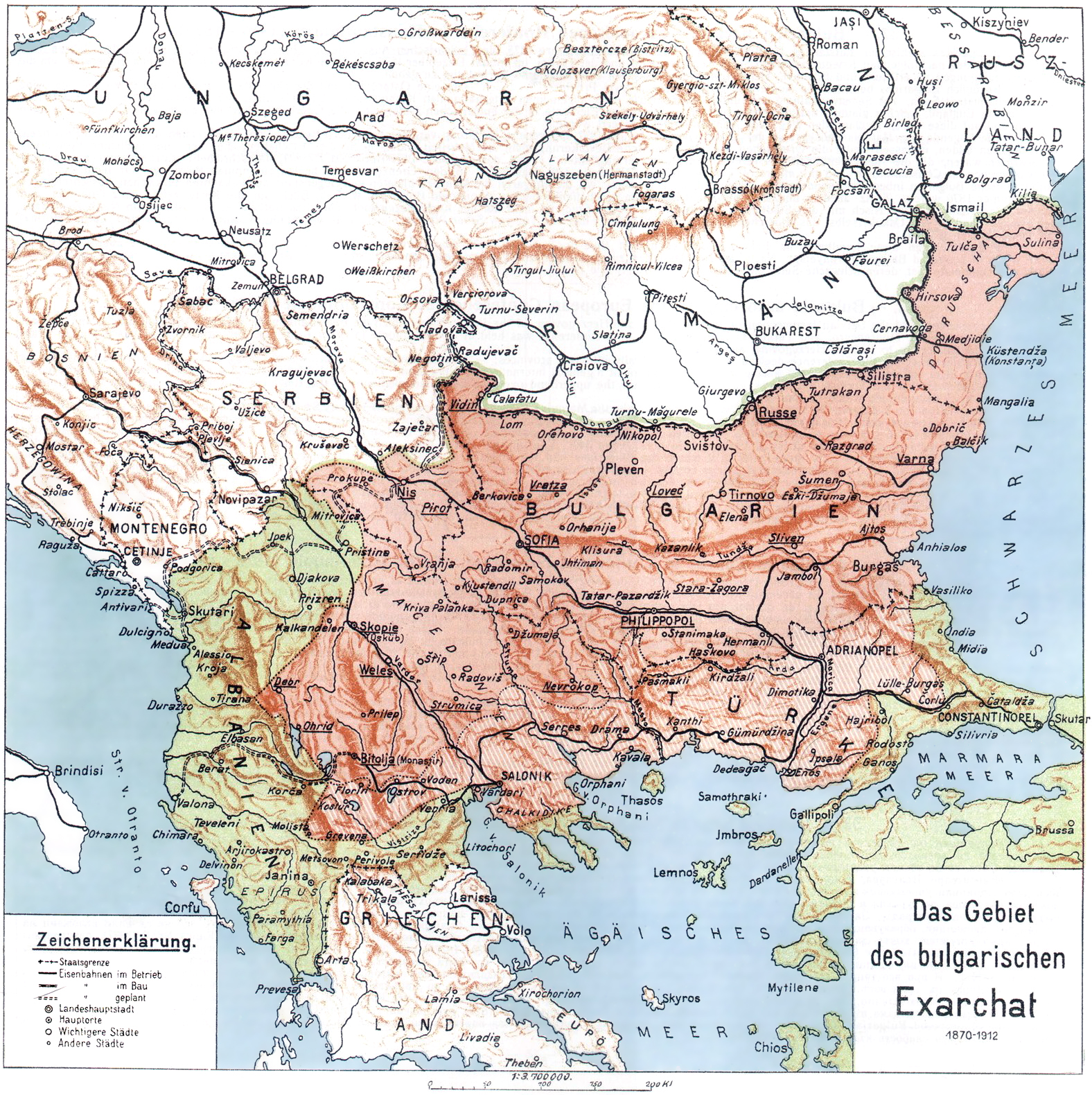
Map of the Bulgarian Exarchate (1870–1913)

Based on territorial definitions according Bulgarian ethnicity, also the territories of the historical Bulgarian national state – the Bulgarian Empire, a Greater Bulgaria nationalist movement has been active for more than a century, aiming to annex the rest of the three national core regions – Moesia, Thrace and Macedonia.

==== Catalonia ====
Catalan countries refers to the idea of creating an independent Catalan country encompassing Catalonia, Balearic Islands, Valencian Community, La Franja, Andorra, Carche, Alghero and Roussillon

==== Croatia ====
The concept of a Greater Croatian state has its modern origins with the Illyrian movement, a pan-South-Slavist cultural and political campaign with roots in the early modern period, and revived by a group of young Croatian intellectuals during the first half of the 19th century. Although this movement arose in the developing European nationalist context of the time, it particularly arose as a response to the more powerful nationalist stirrings in the then-Kingdom of Hungary, with whom Croatia was in a personal union.

The foundations of the concept of Greater Croatia are laid in late 17th and early 18th century works of Pavao Ritter Vitezović. He was the first ideologist of Croatian nation who proclaimed that all South Slavs are Croats. His works were used to legitimize expansionism of the Habsburg Empire to the east and south by asserting its historical rights to claim Illyria. "Illyria" as Slavic territory projected by Vitezović would eventually incorporate not only most of the Southeastern Europe but also parts of Central Europe such as Hungary. Vitezović defines territory of Croatia which, besides Illyria and all Slavic populated territory, includes all the territory between Adriatic, Black and Baltic seas.

==== Czechoslovakia ====
Czech claim to Lusatia, which had been part of the Bohemian Kingdom until the Thirty Years' War, was rejected.

==== Denmark ====
In the 19th century, fueled by nationalism, both Danes and Germans claimed Schleswig-Holstein. The Germans wanted both Schleswig and Holstein to separate from Denmark and join the German Confederation, invoking the Treaty of Ribe stating that the two duchies should stay "Forever Undivided". The Danes, on the other hand, furthered the Eider Policy (da:Ejderpolitikken), stating that the natural Danish border was the Eider (river) as first recognised in the Treaty of Heiligen. Therefore, the Danes sought to reintegrate Schleswig into the Kingdom of Denmark, reversing the separation created by King Abel, while also granting Holstein independence to join the German Confederation as a sovereign entity.

==== Finland ====
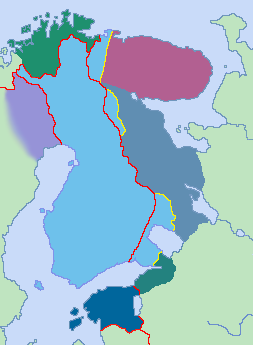
The image includes the borders of Finland according to the 1920 Treaty of Tartu and the 1947 Paris Peace Treaties. East Karelia Estonia Ingria Finland before 1940 Kola Torne Valley Ruija

Greater Finland was an irredentist and nationalist idea which emphasized the territorial expansion of Finland. The most common concept of Greater Finland saw the country as defined by natural borders encompassing the territories inhabited by Finns and Karelians, ranging from the White Sea to Lake Onega and along the Svir River and Neva River—or, more modestly, the Sestra River—to the Gulf of Finland. Some proponents also included the Torne Valley (in Sweden), Ingria, and Estonia.

===== Pan-Finnicism =====
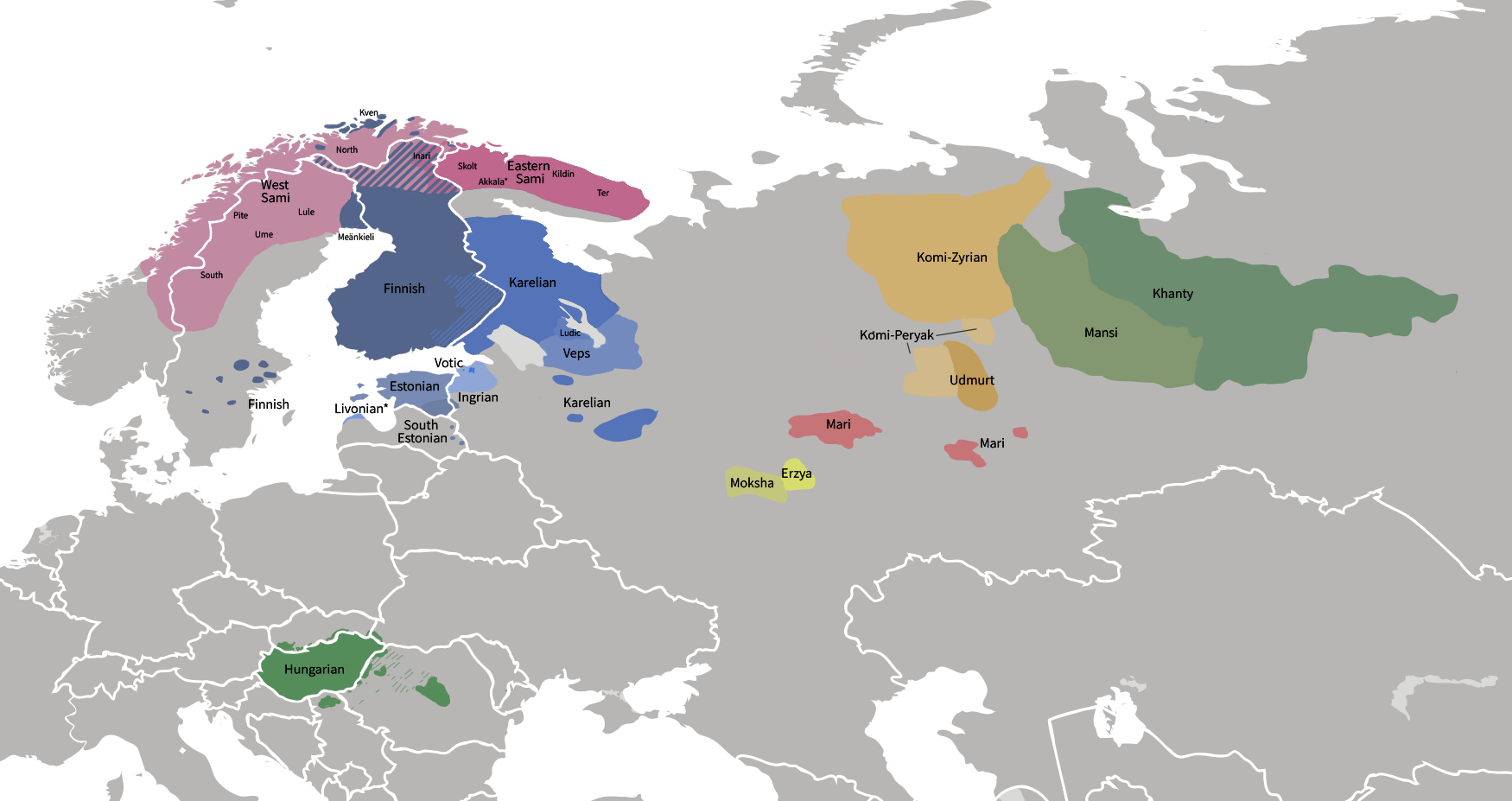
Approximate location of the Finno-Ugric peoples within scope of the ideology

Pan-Finnicism (Finnish: panfennismi), also known as Pan-Fennicism or sometimes even referred to as Finno-Ugrism or even heimoaate (transl. "Kinship Ideology/Thought") is a pan-nationalist idea which advocates for the political or economic unification of the Finno-Ugric peoples. The idea is broad in its meaning and oftentimes it simply refers to the Finno-Ugric peoples, however on rare occasion it can be limited to only the Baltic Finnic peoples or to the Finnic peoples.

==== Former Yugoslavia ====
Some of the most violent irredentist conflicts of recent times in Europe flared up as a consequence of the break-up of the former federal state of Yugoslavia in the early 1990s. One of the last conflicts erupted further south with the ethnic Albanian majority in Kosovo seeking to switch allegiance to the adjoining state of Albania.

==== France ====
The natural borders of France (French: Frontières naturelles de la France) were a nationalist theory developed in France, notably during the French Revolution. They correspond to the Rhine, the Atlantic Ocean and Mediterranean Sea, the Pyrenees and the Alps, according to the revolutionaries.

==== Galicia ====
Galicia irredenta is used to refer to the Galician-speaking parts of Asturias or Castile and León, in contrast to Galicia proper. These territories are sometimes divided into three subregions: El Bierzo (O Bierzo in Galician), Eo-Navia and As Portelas (Alta Seabra (Upper Sanabria) in Galician).

There have been several attempts from these territories to join Galicia. An example is Porto de Sanabria, a small village where, in 2018, a non-binding vote was organized on the village's annexation by Galicia due to a lack of response from the government of Castile and León to requests from locals to fix a road. In total, 202 people voted in favor, 19 against and 6 submitted blank votes.

Another example was El Bierzo, a comarca where more people prefer to join Galicia than stay in Castile and León. One proposal there was for a new province to be created as part of Galicia. The Galician Nationalist Bloc formally submitted the proposal to Galicia's parliament in 2021, but it was rejected by the governing People's Party and opposition Spanish Socialist Workers' Party.

==== Germany ====
The partition of Czechoslovakia from 1938 through 1939. German gains in purple (dark: Sudetenland, light: Protectorate of Bohemia and Moravia)

During the debate of what was then called the German Question (die deutsche Frage) in the 19th century prior to the unification of Germany (1871), the term Großdeutschland, "Greater Germany", referred to a possible German nation consisting of the states that later comprised the German Empire and Austria. The term Kleindeutschland "Lesser Germany" referred to a possible German state without Austria. The term was later used by Germans referring to Greater Germany, a state consisting of pre–World War I Germany, Austria and the Sudetenland.

Since the foundation of the German Reich in 1871, the only times during which German governments did not make some form of explicit or implicit irredentist demand or claim - including the demand for reunification during German partition - were prior to World War I and following German reunification.

The Weimar Republic contained significant irredentist elements which frequently formed part of the governing coalitions. The Treaty of Locarno settled Germany's western boundaries (accepting among others the definitive loss of Alsace-Lorraine) but regarding the eastern boundaries with Czechoslovakia and the Second Polish Republic it only contained a provision that any revision of borders would occur non-violently. There was never a renunciation on the part of the German government prior to World War II of any claim to territory to the east of its internationally recognized borders. The foreign ministers of Germany and France who are credited with the success of the treaty negotiations, Aristide Briand and Gustav Stresemann, were awarded the Nobel Peace Prize for their efforts. The Territory of the Saar Basin was put under a League of Nations mandate but was de facto a French protectorate. In 1935 (two years after Hitler had been appointed chancellor) a previously agreed to referendum was held, transferring sovereignty over the Saar Area to Germany. The reference to "1937 borders" (de:Deutsches Reich in den Grenzen vom 31. Dezember 1937) was used after the war to allow for the inclusion of the Saar Area into this concept of "Germany" while at the same time excluding the territorial developments of 1938 and early 1939 (see below), which were widely seen as the illegitimate result of German aggression and Anglo-French appeasement after the war.

A main point of Nazi ideology was to reunify all Germans either born or living outside of Germany to create an "all-German Reich". These beliefs ultimately resulted in the Munich Agreement, which ceded to Germany areas of Czechoslovakia that were mainly inhabited by Sudeten Germans, and the Anschluss, which ceded the entire country of Austria to Germany; both events occurred in 1938. Later (but still prior to the outbreak of general war in Europe) the Protectorate of Bohemia and Moravia was formed which included a Czech ethnic majority and a German speaking minority among other ethnic groups. Among the Origins of World War II in Europe was the German irredentist demand to the Polish corridor an ethnically diverse but predominantly Polish area that separated East Prussia from the rest of Germany and was the only access to the sea for the Second Polish Republic. Another point of contention in the interwar German-Polish relationship was the status of the Free City of Danzig which had an ethnic German majority population but had become a League of Nations backed City State following World War I due to its strategic importance.

West Germany and East Germany (1949–1990)

During German partition both states initially claimed their intention was an eventual German reunification, but East Germany eventually abandoned this claim. The German Basic Law contained both an exhortation towards reunification and a provision (Article 23) concerning the "joining of other German areas" to the area of validity of the Basic Law. Article 23 was struck from the Basic Law in the course of reunification and has since been replaced with an unrelated provision concerning the European Union. The German Democratic Republic was relatively quick to officially endorse the Oder Neisse line as its new eastern border, signing the Treaty of Zgorzelec in 1950. However, there remained irredentist sentiment regarding territory east of the new border among the populace of both German states. Most of the West German public and political class refused to accept the loss of the eastern territories in the early years of the postwar era as evidenced by a list of potential car license plates for cities in the GDR, in areas lost due to World War II and even in areas like the former Free City of Danzig. The government of Willy Brandt (governed 1969–1974) made efforts to de facto recognize the postwar status quo in exchange for political rapprochement in the course of Ostpolitik, accepting among other things the entry of both East and West Germany into the United Nations in 1973. Willy Brandt was awarded a Nobel Peace Prize for his reconciliation efforts. However, the slim majority his social-liberal coalition had won in the 1969 German federal election had dwindled by 1972 because several members of the Social Democratic Party and the Free Democratic Party had switched parties due to their disagreement with Ostpolitik. After surprisingly surviving the 1972 constructive vote of no confidence, the government was reelected in a landslide in the 1972 German federal election which was held a year early in light of events. While the CDU/CSU government of Helmut Kohl which came into office in 1982 did not reverse Ostpolitik, the treaties accepting the postwar borders had been carefully worded so as to preserve the option of some different "final settlement" in the course of a peace treaty or following a possible German reunification. Thus the question of German claims to territory outside the two German states became acute again in the course of the negotiations that ultimately led to the Treaty on the Final Settlement with Respect to Germany or "two plus four agreement" and the final official renunciation of all German claims to any territory beyond the borders it achieved on 3 October 1990. Since then irredentist claims have been limited to a tiny far right minority and have had no major influence on national politics. However, in the course of the Kaliningrad question there were negotiations between Germany and Russia as to whether sovereignty should be transferred to Germany.

==== Greece ====
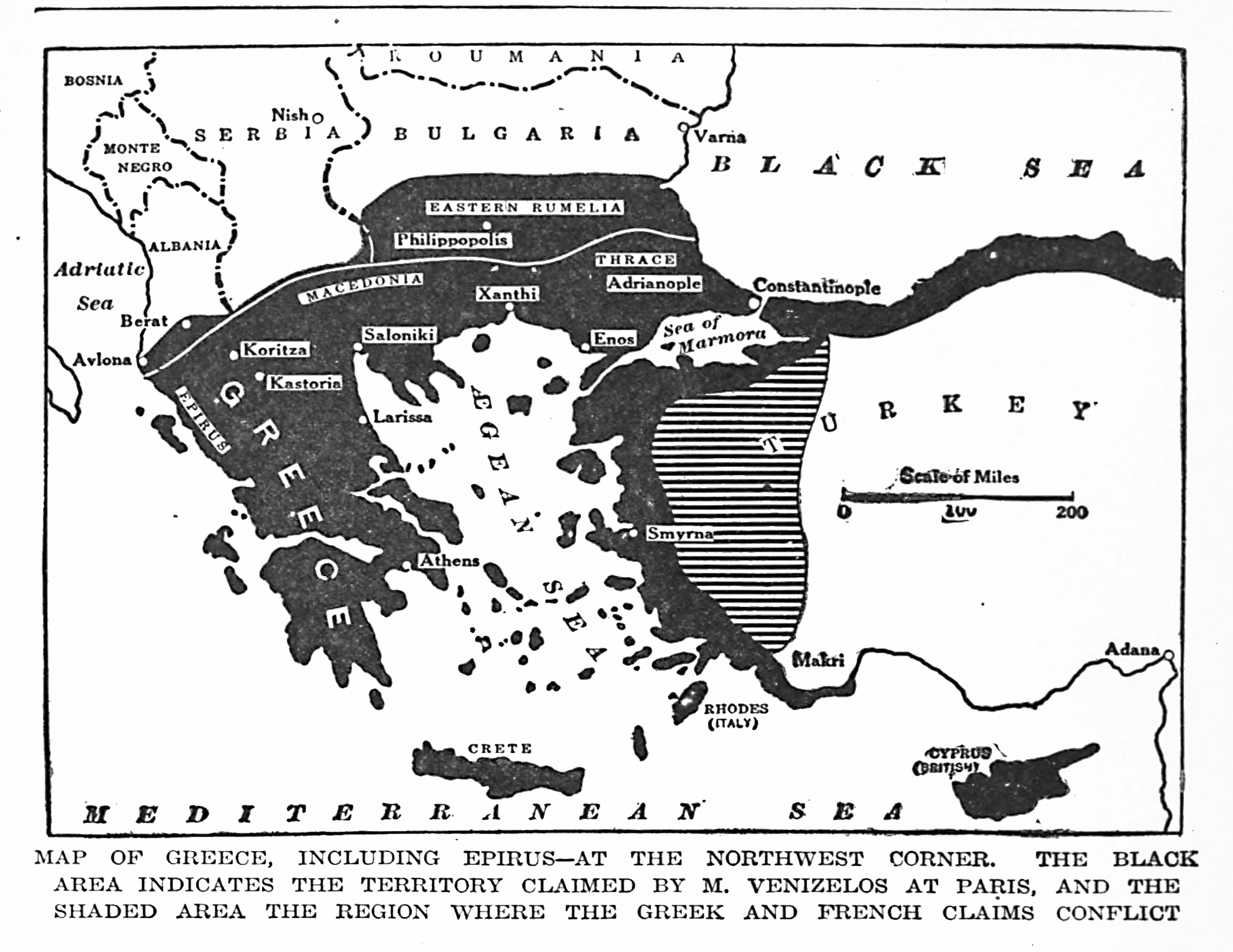
Claims presented by Greece at the Paris Peace Conference, 1919

Following the Greek War of Independence in 1821–1832, Greece began to contest areas inhabited by Greeks, primarily against the Ottoman Empire. The Megali Idea (Great Idea) envisioned Greek incorporation of Greek-inhabited lands, but also historical lands in Asia Minor corresponding with the predominantly Greek and Orthodox Byzantine Empire and the dominions of the ancient Greeks.

The Greek quest began with the acquisition of Thessaly through the Convention of Constantinople in 1881, a failed war against Turkey in 1897 and the Balkan Wars (Macedonia, Epirus, some Aegean Islands). After World War I, Greece acquired Western Thrace from Bulgaria as per the Treaty of Neuilly-sur-Seine, but also Ionia/Smyrna and Eastern Thrace (excluding Constantinople) from the Ottoman Empire as ordained in the Treaty of Sèvres. Subsequently, Greece launched an unsuccessful campaign to enforce their gains in Asia Minor, but were halted by the Turkish War of Independence. The events culminated into the Great Fire of Smyrna, Population exchange between Greece and Turkey, and Treaty of Lausanne which returned Eastern Thrace and Ionia to the newfound Republic of Turkey. The events are known as the "Asia Minor Catastrophe" to Greeks. The Ionian Islands were ceded by Britain in 1864, and the Dodecanese by Italy in 1947.

Another concern of the Greeks is the incorporation of Cyprus which was ceded by the Ottomans to the British. As a result of the Cyprus Emergency the island gained independence as the Republic of Cyprus in 1960. The failed incorporation by Greece through coup d'état and the Turkish invasion of Cyprus in 1974 led to the formation of the mostly unrecognized Northern Cyprus and has culminated into the present-day Cyprus issue.

==== Hungary ====
Map of the Austro-Hungarian Monarchy: Kingdom of Hungary (green) and the autonomous Kingdom of Croatia-Slavonia (red).These areas comprised the borders of the Kingdom of Hungary within the Habsburg monarchy.

The restoration of the borders of Hungary to their state prior to World War I, in order to unite all ethnic Hungarians within the same country once again.

Hungarian irredentism or Greater Hungary are irredentist and revisionist political ideas concerning redemption of territories of the historical Kingdom of Hungary. The idea is associated with Hungarian revisionism, targeting at least to regain control over Hungarian-populated areas in Hungary's neighbouring countries. Hungarian historians did not use the term Greater Hungary, because the "Historic Hungary" is the established term for the Kingdom of Hungary before 1920.

The Treaty of Trianon defined the borders of the new independent Hungary and, compared against the claims of the pre-war Kingdom, new Hungary had approximately 72% less land stake and about two-thirds fewer inhabitants, almost 5 million of these being of Hungarian ethnicity. However, only 54% of the inhabitants of the pre-war Kingdom of Hungary were Hungarians before World War I. Following the treaty's instatement, Hungarian leaders became inclined towards revoking some of its terms. This political aim gained greater attention and was a serious national concern up through the second World War.

Map of territories reassigned to Hungary in 1938–1941 by Nazi Germany including Northern Transylvania and Transcarpathia

Irredentism in the 1930s led Hungary to form an alliance with Nazi Germany. Eva S. Balogh states: "Hungary's participation in World War II resulted from a desire to revise the Treaty of Trianon so as to recover territories lost after World War I. This revisionism was the basis for Hungary's interwar foreign policy."

Between November 1938 and April 1941, Hungary took full advantage of German patronage and, in four different stages, approximately doubled her size. Ethnically, these acquisitions were a mixed bag, some were populated mostly by Hungarians, while others, such as the remainder of Carpathian Ruthenia, were almost wholly non-Hungarian in composition. However, regarding partitioned Transylvania, the population was mixed, near equal between Hungarians and non-Hungarians.

Hungary began with the First Vienna Award in 1938 (redeeming southern Slovakia from Czechoslovakia with mainly Hungarians) and the Second Vienna Award in 1940 (Northern Transylvania). Through military campaigns it gained the remainder of Carpathian Ruthenia in 1939. In 1941 it added the Yugoslav parts of Bačka, Baranja, Međimurje, and Prekmurje.

After defeat in 1945, the borders of Hungary as defined by the Treaty of Trianon were restored, except for three Hungarian villages that were transferred to Czechoslovakia. These villages are today administratively a part of Bratislava.

The 2022 Russian invasion of Ukraine revived interest among Hungarian nationalists for annexing parts of Ukraine.

On 27 January 2024 László Toroczkai said at a conference that his party Mi Hazánk Mozgalom would lay claim to a Hungarian-populated region in western Ukraine if the war led to Ukraine losing its statehood.

==== Italy ====
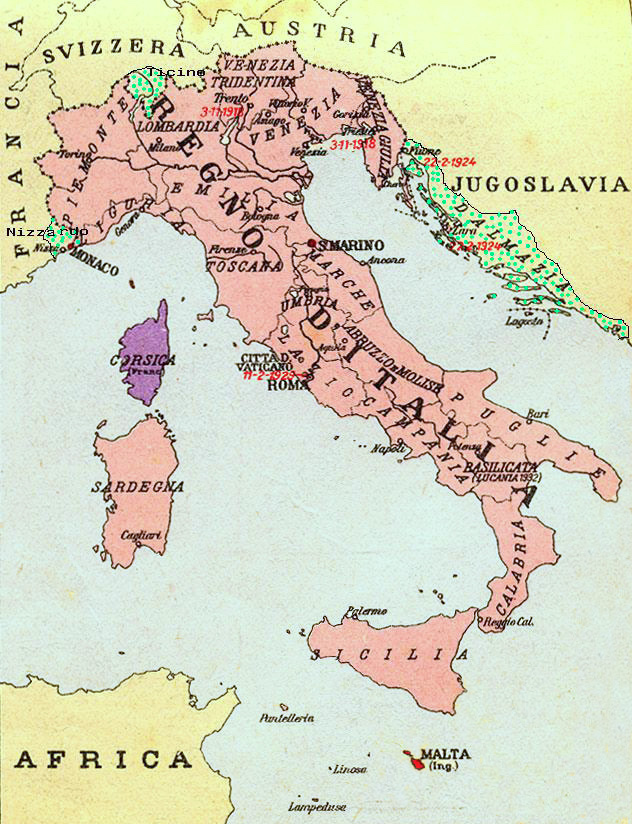
Italian ethnic regions claimed in the 1930s by the Italian irredentism: * Green: Nice, Ticino and Dalmatia * Red: Malta * Violet: Corsica * Savoy and Corfu were later claimed

Italian irredentism was a political movement during the late 19th and early 20th centuries in Italy with irredentist goals which promoted the unification of geographic areas in which indigenous peoples were ethnic Italians. At the beginning, the movement promoted the annexation to Italy of territories where Italians formed the absolute majority of the population, but retained by the Austrian Empire after the Third Italian War of Independence in 1866.

Even after the Capture of Rome (1871), the final event of the unification of Italy, many ethnic Italian speakers (Trentino-Alto Adigan Italians, Savoyard Italians, Corfiot Italians, Niçard Italians, Swiss Italians, Corsican Italians, Maltese Italians, Istrian Italians and Dalmatian Italians) remained outside the borders of the Kingdom of Italy and this situation created the Italian irredentism. During World War I the main "irredent lands" (terre irredente) were considered to be the provinces of Trento and Trieste and, in a narrow sense, irredentists referred to the Italian patriots living in these two areas.

Italian irredentism was not a formal organization but rather an opinion movement, advocated by several different groups, claiming that Italy had to reach its "natural borders" or unify territories inhabited by Italians. Similar nationalistic ideas were common in Europe in the late 19th century. This idea of Italia irredenta is not to be confused with the Risorgimento, the historical events that led to irredentism, nor with nationalism or Imperial Italy, the political philosophy that took the idea further under fascism.

The term was later expanded to also include multilingual and multiethnic areas, where Italians were a relative majority or a substantial minority, within the northern Italian region encompassed by the Alps, with German, Italian, Slovene, Croatian, Ladin and Istro-Romanian population, such as South Tyrol, Istria, Gorizia and Gradisca and part of Dalmatia. The claims were further extended also to the city of Fiume, Corsica, the island of Malta, the County of Nice and Italian Switzerland.

After the end of World War I, the Italian irredentist movement was hegemonised, manipulated and distorted by fascism, which made it an instrument of nationalist propaganda, placed at the center of a policy, conditioned by belated imperial ambitions, which took the form of "forced Italianizations", in the aspiration for the birth of a Great Italy and a vast Italian Empire. After World War II, Italian irredentism disappeared along with the defeated Fascists and the Monarchy of the House of Savoy. After the Treaty of Paris (1947) and the Treaty of Osimo (1975), all territorial claims were abandoned by the Italian Republic (see Foreign relations of Italy). The Italian irredentist movement thus vanished from Italian politics.

==== Lithuania ====
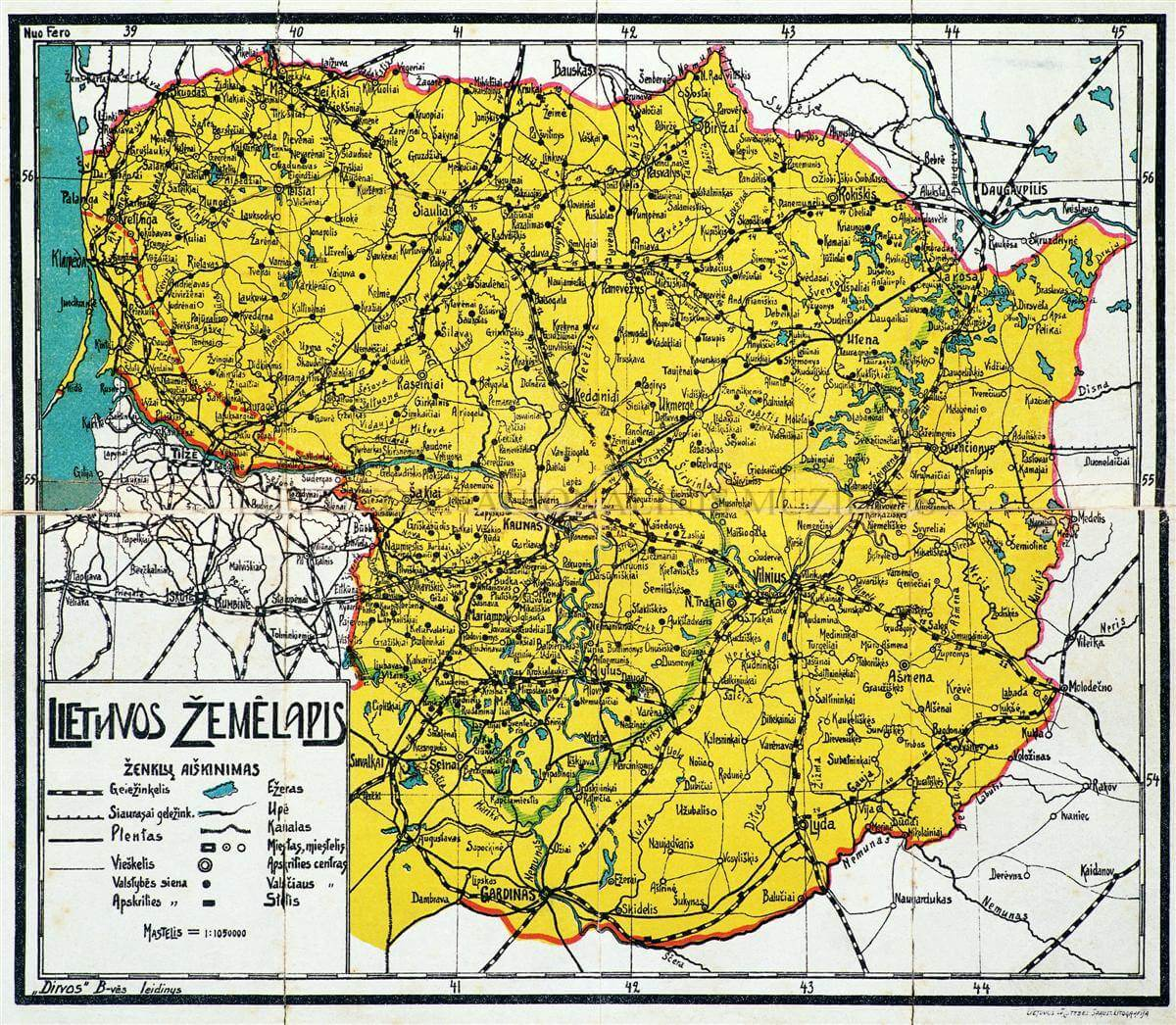
The map shows Lithuania's territorial claims that were recognised by the Soviet treaty. They were almost identical to the historical ethnic Lithuanian lands of the 13th to the 16th centuries.

Ethnographic Lithuania is a nationalist concept that defines Lithuanian territories as a significant part of the territories that belonged to the Grand Duchy of Lithuania and Lithuanians as all people living on them, regardless of whether those people contemporarily or currently speak the Lithuanian language and considered themselves Lithuanian. According to the supporters of the ethnographic Lithuania, Lithuanian Poles and Northwestern Belarusians were "slavicized Lithuanians" who needed to be re-Lithuanized. They argued that an individual cannot decide on his ethnicity and nationality, which are decided not by language but ancestry.

==== Luxembourg ====
The territorial demands of the ruling Luxembourg National Union Government were made known in late summer 1945. Luxembourg required Germany to relinquish German territory that had been separated from the former Duchy of Luxembourg under the terms of the 1815 Congress of Vienna, and the further extension of Luxembourg to the Saar River. Only a portion of the population of Luxembourg was in agreement with these concepts of a "Greater Luxembourg".

In support of this territorial claim, in November 1945 troops of the Grand Duchy of Luxembourg occupied a small zone of their own within the actual French occupation zone, installing two garrisons.

In a memorandum dated November 27, 1946, the Government of Luxembourg stated that the border be relocated between 5 and 10 kilometers (3.1 and 6.2 mi) into German territory. An area of 544 square kilometers (210 sq mi) was affected, including all or part of the German border districts of Bitburg, Our, Saarburg, and Prüm, the population of which was 31,188 people. The area constituted approximately 20% of the territory that Luxembourg had ceded to Prussia in 1815.

==== Moldova ====
Greater Moldova is an irredentist concept today used for the credence that the Republic of Moldova should be expanded with lands that used to belong to the Principality of Moldavia or were once inside its political orbit. Historically, it also meant the unification of the lands of the former principality under either Romania or the Soviet Union. Territories cited in such proposals always include Western Moldavia and the whole of Bessarabia, as well as Bukovina and the Hertsa region; some versions also feature parts of Transylvania, while still others include areas of Podolia, or Pokuttia in its entirety. In most of its post-Soviet iterations, "Greater Moldova" is associated with a belief that Moldovans are a distinct people from Romanians, and that they inhabit parts of Romania and Ukraine. It is a marginal position within the Moldovan identity disputes, corresponding to radical forms of an ideology polemically known as "Moldovenism".

==== Montenegro ====
During the breakup of Yugoslavia in the early 1990s, Montenegro's President Momir Bulatović supported unity and alliance with Serbia as well as supporting irredentist claims to Dubrovnik and territory in Herzegovina that he stated were historically part of Montenegro. The Serbian journal Epoha in 1991 declared that if Bosnia and Herzegovina's Bosniaks wanted to secede from Yugoslavia, that Eastern Herzegovina should be ceded to Montenegro. The International Criminal Tribunal for the former Yugoslavia declared that the Serbian and Montenegrin leadership during the siege of Dubrovnik sought to annex Dubrovnik along with the "coastal regions of Croatia between the town of Neum, Bosnia and Herzegovina, in the north-west and the Montenegrin border in the south-east" into Montenegro.

==== Netherlands ====
Greater Netherlands is a concept which unites the Netherlands, Flanders, and sometimes Brussels. Additionally, a Greater Netherlands state may include the annexation of the French Westhoek, Suriname, formerly Dutch-speaking areas of Germany and France, or even the ethnically Dutch and/or Afrikaans-speaking parts of South Africa. A related proposal is the Pan-Netherlands concept, which includes Wallonia and potentially also Luxembourg.

The Greater Netherlands concept was originally developed by Pieter Geyl, who argued that the "Dutch tribe", encompassing the Flemish and Dutch people, are only separated due to the Eighty Years' War against Spain in the 16th century. While Geyl—an outspoken anti-fascist—argued from a historical and cultural perspective, the fascist Verdinaso and Nazi movements built upon the idea of a Greater Netherlands during the 1930s and 1940s with a focus on ethnic nationalism, a concept still prominent among some on the far-right. Other 21st-century proponents of the Greater Netherlands concept include moderates in Belgium and the Netherlands who seek to elevate the Benelux ideal to a more centralized political union.

==== North Macedonia ====
Some Macedonian nationalists promoted the irredentist concept of a United Macedonia (Macedonian: Обединета Македонија, romanized: Obedineta Makedonija) among ethnic Macedonian nationalists, which involves territorial claims on the northern province of Macedonia in Greece, but also in Blagoevgrad Province ("Pirin Macedonia") in Bulgaria, Albania, and Serbia. The United Macedonia concept aims to unify the transnational region of Macedonia in the Balkans (which they claim as their homeland and which they assert was wrongfully divided under the Treaty of Bucharest in 1913), into a single state under their domination, with Thessaloniki (Solun in the Slavic languages) as its capital.

==== Norway ====
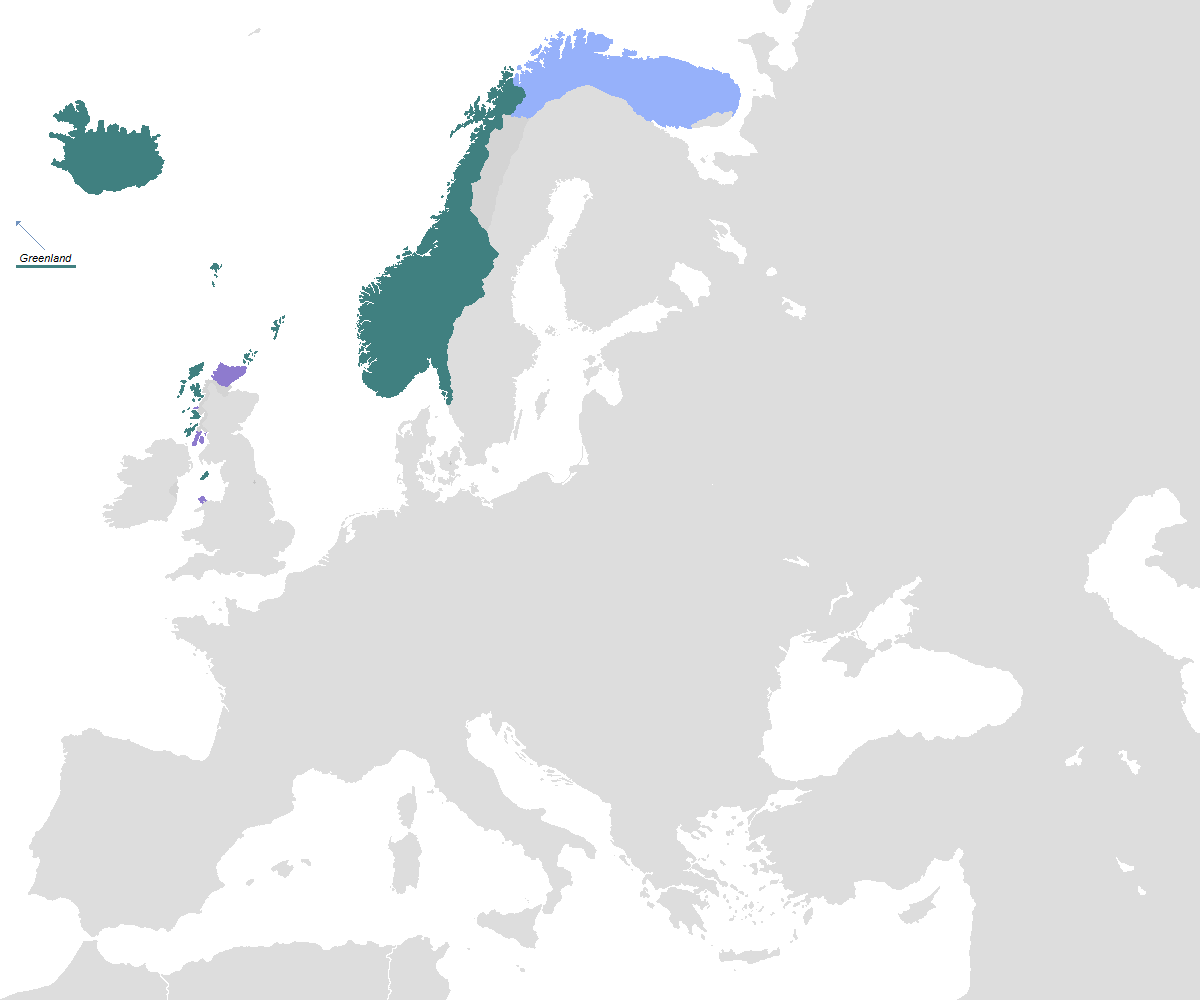
The Kingdom of Norway at its greatest extent

The Kingdom of Norway had several territorial disputes throughout its history, mainly regarding islands and sea boundaries in the Arctic Ocean. The Old Kingdom of Norway, which was the Norwegian territories at its maximum extent, included Iceland, the settleable areas of Greenland, the Faroe Islands, and the Northern Isles and Hebrides (today part of Scotland). Under Danish sovereignty since they established a hegemonic position in the Kalmar Union, the territories were considered as Norwegian colonies. When in the Treaty of Kiel in 1814, Norway's territories were transferred from Denmark to Sweden, the territories of Iceland, Greenland, and the Faroe Islands were maintained by Denmark.

In 1919, the foreign minister of Norway, Nils Claus Ihlen, declared that the Norwegians would not object to a claim of Denmark to the whole island of Greenland, which at the time was mostly occupied by Danish colonies, with a few Norwegian settlements in the eastern part of the island. The claim was formally declared in 1921, but the Norwegian government rejected Denmark's claim and later stated that parts of eastern Greenland belonged to Norway. A dispute between the two countries was not settled until 1933, by the Permanent Court of International Justice. The court concluded that Denmark had sovereignty of the whole island of Greenland, ending Norwegian control over Erik the Red's Land. Norway formerly included the provinces Jämtland, Härjedalen, Idre-Särna (lost since the Second Treaty of Brömsebro), and Bohuslän (lost since the Treaty of Roskilde), which were ceded to Sweden after Danish defeats in wars such as the Thirty Years' War and Second Northern War.

==== Poland ====
Post-World War II border changes of Poland. The respective Polish, German, and Ukrainian populations were expelled.

Kresy ("Borderlands") are the eastern lands that formerly belonged to Poland and held a sizable Polish population. In 1921, during the Polish-Soviet war, Polish troops crossed the Curzon Line that had been declared as the eastern polish border by an international commission, and in the Kiev offensive (1920) conquered territories, now today inside the borders of Ukraine and Belarus, which had been taken from Poland during the Partitions of Poland, and also seized 7 percent of Lithuania's territory. The new polish territories east of the Curzon line were taken back by the Soviet Union in 1939 under the Molotov–Ribbentrop Pact after the Soviet-German invasion of Poland, and include major cities, like Lviv (Lwów) (nowadays Ukraine), Vilnius (Wilno) (today the capital of Lithuania), and Hrodna (Grodno) (Belarus), which all had a majority Polish population. Even though Kresy, or the Eastern Borderlands, are no longer Polish territories, the area is still inhabited by a significant Polish minority, and the memory of the Polish Kresy is still cultivated. The attachment to the "myth of Kresy", the vision of the region as a peaceful, idyllic, rural land, has been criticized in Polish discourse.

In January, February and March 2012, the Centre for Public Opinion Research conducted a survey, asking Poles about their ties to the Kresy. It turned out that almost 15% of the population of Poland (4.3–4.6 million people) declared that they had either been born in the Kresy, or had a parent or a grandparent who came from that region. Numerous treasures of Polish culture remain and there are numerous Kresy-oriented organizations. There are Polish sports clubs (Pogoń Lwów, and formerly FK Polonia Vilnius), newspapers (Gazeta Lwowska, Kurier Wileński), radio stations (in Lviv and Vilnius), numerous theatres, schools, choirs and folk ensembles. Poles living in Kresy are helped by Fundacja Pomoc Polakom na Wschodzie, a Polish government-sponsored organization, as well as other organizations, such as The Association of Help of Poles in the East Kresy (see also Karta Polaka). Money is frequently collected to help those Poles who live in the Kresy, and there are several annual events, such as a Christmas Package for a Polish Veteran in Kresy, and Summer with Poland, sponsored by the Association "Polish Community", in which Polish children from Kresy are invited to visit Poland. Polish language handbooks and films, as well as medicines and clothes are collected and sent to Kresy. Books are most often sent to Polish schools which exist there—for example, in December 2010, The University of Wrocław organized an event called Become a Polish Santa Claus and Give a Book to a Polish Child in Kresy. Polish churches and cemeteries (such as Cemetery of the Defenders of Lwów) are renovated with money from Poland.

==== Portugal ====
Portugal does not recognize Spanish sovereignty over the territory of Olivença, which was taken by Spain during the Napoleonic Wars. Afterwards, a treaty was signed, in which Spain agreed to return the occupied territory, never ultimately doing so. They also have been known to claim Galicia.

==== Romania ====
Romanian nationalists lay claims to Greater Romania, but especially to Moldova, most of the territory which was part of the country between 1918 and 1940. Moldovan was the Soviet name for the Romanian language. There is some (but not universal) support by Moldovans for a peaceful and voluntary reunion with Romania, not least because (having joined the European Union), the economy has burgeoned and Romanian citizens have gained freedom of movement in Europe. Also, Russian irredentism over Transnistria has caused alarm and resentment.

==== Russia ====
Regions of Ukraine annexed by Russia in 2014 (Crimea) and 2022 (Donetsk, Kherson, Luhansk and Zaporizhzhia), with a red line marking the area of actual control by Russia on 30 September 2022.

The annexation of Crimea by the Russian Federation in 2014 was based on a claim of protecting ethnic Russians residing there. Crimea was part of the Russian Empire from 1783 to 1917, after which it enjoyed a few years of autonomy until it was made part of the Russian Soviet Federative Socialist Republic (which was a part of the Soviet Union) from 1921 to 1954 and then transferred to Soviet Ukraine (which also was a part of the Soviet Union) in 1954. After the dissolution of the Soviet Union, Crimea still remained part of Ukraine until February 2014. Russia declared Crimea to be part of the Russian Federation in March 2014, and effective administration commenced. The Russian regional status is not currently recognised by the UN General Assembly (Resolution 68/262) and by most countries.

Russian irredentism also includes southeastern and coastal Ukraine, known as Novorossiya, a term from the Russian Empire.

If 12 July 2021 essay On the Historical Unity of Russians and Ukrainians, published by President Vladimir Putin, is to be considered an official Russian position, then its irredentist claims now extend to the entire territory of historical Ukraine and Belarus, including some areas now part of Romania.

==== Serbia ====
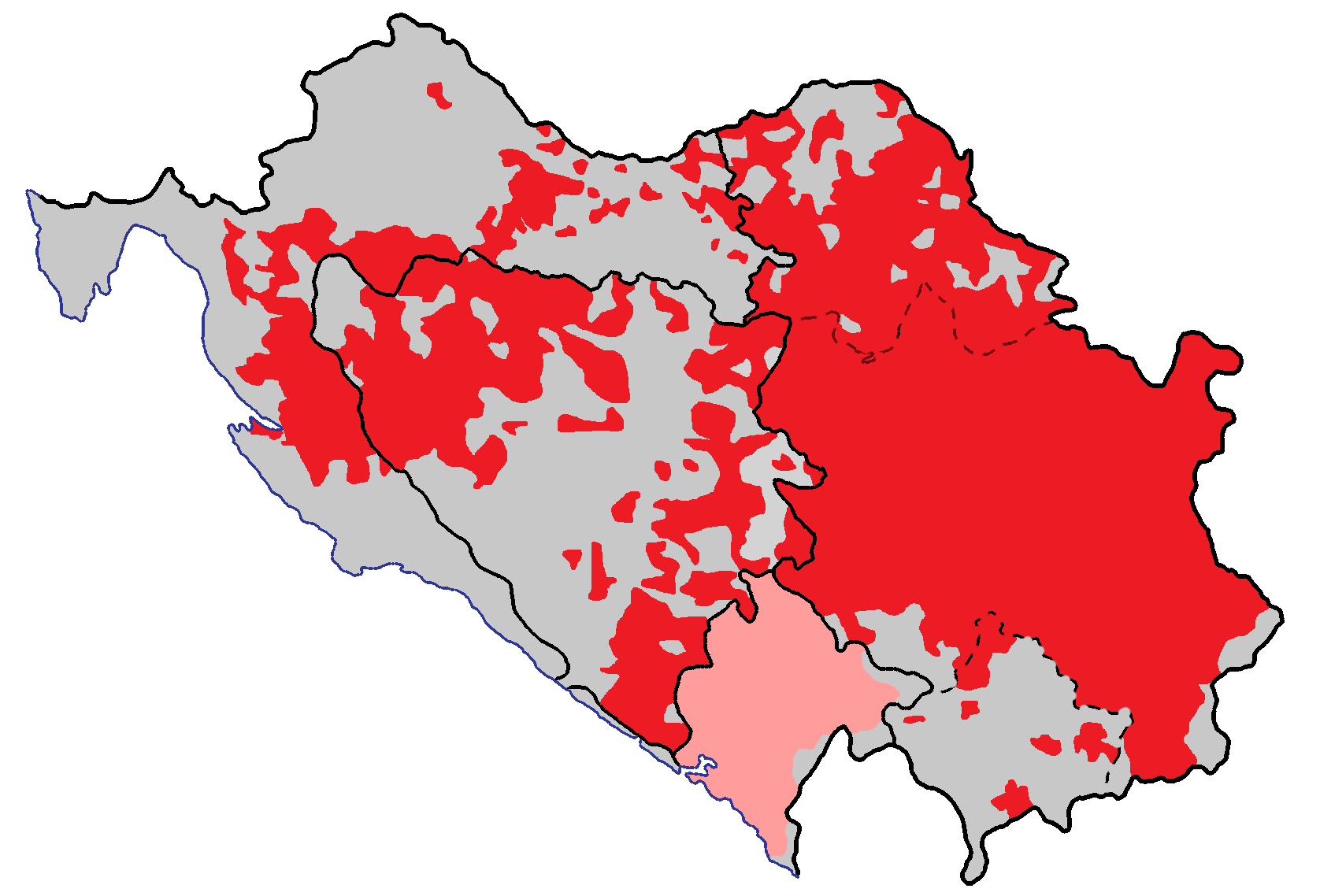
The distribution of Serbs and Montenegrins in Yugoslavia (except Macedonia and Slovenia) in 1981

Serbian irredentism is manifested in Greater Serbia, the Serbian nationalist ideology. Greater Serbia consists of Serbia, North Macedonia, Bosnia and Herzegovina, Montenegro and large parts of Croatia. Used in the context of the Yugoslav wars, however, the Serbian struggle for Serbs to remain united in one country does not quite fit the term "irredentism". In the 19th century, Pan-Serbism sought to unite all of the Serb people across the Balkans, under Ottoman and Habsburg rule. Some intellectuals sought to unite all South Slavs (regardless of religion) into a Serbian state. Serbia had gained independence from the Ottoman Empire in 1878. Bosnia and Herzegovina, annexed by the Austrians in 1908, was viewed of as a part of the Serbian homeland. Serbia directed its territorial aspirations to the south, as the north and west was held by Austria. Macedonia was divided between Serbia, Bulgaria and Greece after the Balkan Wars.

In 1914, aspirations were directed towards Austria-Hungary. A government policy sought to incorporate all Serb-inhabited areas, and other South Slavic areas, thereby laying the foundation of Yugoslavia. With the establishment of the Kingdom of Serbs, Croats and Slovenes (later Yugoslavia), the Serbs now lived united in one country. During the breakup of Yugoslavia, the Serb political leadership in break-away Croatia and Bosnia and Herzegovina declared their territories to be part of the Federal Republic of Yugoslavia (Serbia and Montenegro).

The project of unification of Serb-inhabited areas in Croatia and Bosnia and Herzegovina during the Yugoslav Wars (see United Serb Republic) ultimately failed. The Croatian Operation Storm ended large-scale combat and captured most of the Republic of Serbian Krajina, while the Dayton Agreement ended the Bosnian War. Bosnia and Herzegovina was established as a federal republic, made up by two separate entities, one being Serb-inhabited Republika Srpska. There has since been calls by Bosnian Serb politicians for the secession of Republika Srpska, and possible unification with Serbia.

After the Kosovo War (1998–99), Kosovo became a UN protectorate, still de jure part of Serbia. The Albanian-majority Kosovo assembly unilaterally declared the independence of Kosovo in 2008, and its status since is disputed.

==== Slovenia ====
United Slovenia (Slovene: Zedinjena Slovenija or Združena Slovenija) is the name originally given to an unrealized political programme of the Slovene national movement, formulated during the Spring of Nations in 1848. The programme demanded (a) unification of all the Slovene-inhabited areas into one single kingdom under the rule of the Austrian Empire, (b) equal rights of Slovene in public, and (c) strongly opposed the planned integration of the Habsburg monarchy with the German Confederation. The programme failed to meet its main objectives, but it remained the common political program of all currents within the Slovene national movement until World War I.

==== Sweden ====
The Åland islands were disputed at one point, due to it having a population that overwhelmingly speaks Swedish.

==== Switzerland ====
Alemannic separatism is a historical movement of separatism of the Alemannic-German-speaking areas of Austria, France, and Germany (viz., South Baden, Swabia (viz. most of Württemberg and Bavarian Swabia), Alsace and Vorarlberg), aiming at a unification with the Swiss Confederacy (later Switzerland).

==== Ukraine ====
Greater Ukraine refers to claims made by some Ukrainian nationalist groups to territory outside of Ukraine which they consider part of the Ukrainian national homeland.

=== North America ===
==== Central America ====
Attempts to restore the Federal Republic of Central America have existed since its dissolution. One of the best known cases was when the liberal Guatemalan President Justo Rufino Barrios, with the support of Honduras and the United States, tried to re-establish the Central American Federation in the so-called Intentona de Barrios, but that ended with his death in the Battle of Chalchuapa in 1885. Other short-lived attempts include the Greater Republic of Central America between 1896 and 1898 and the Federation of Central America between 1921 and 1922.

==== Mexico ====
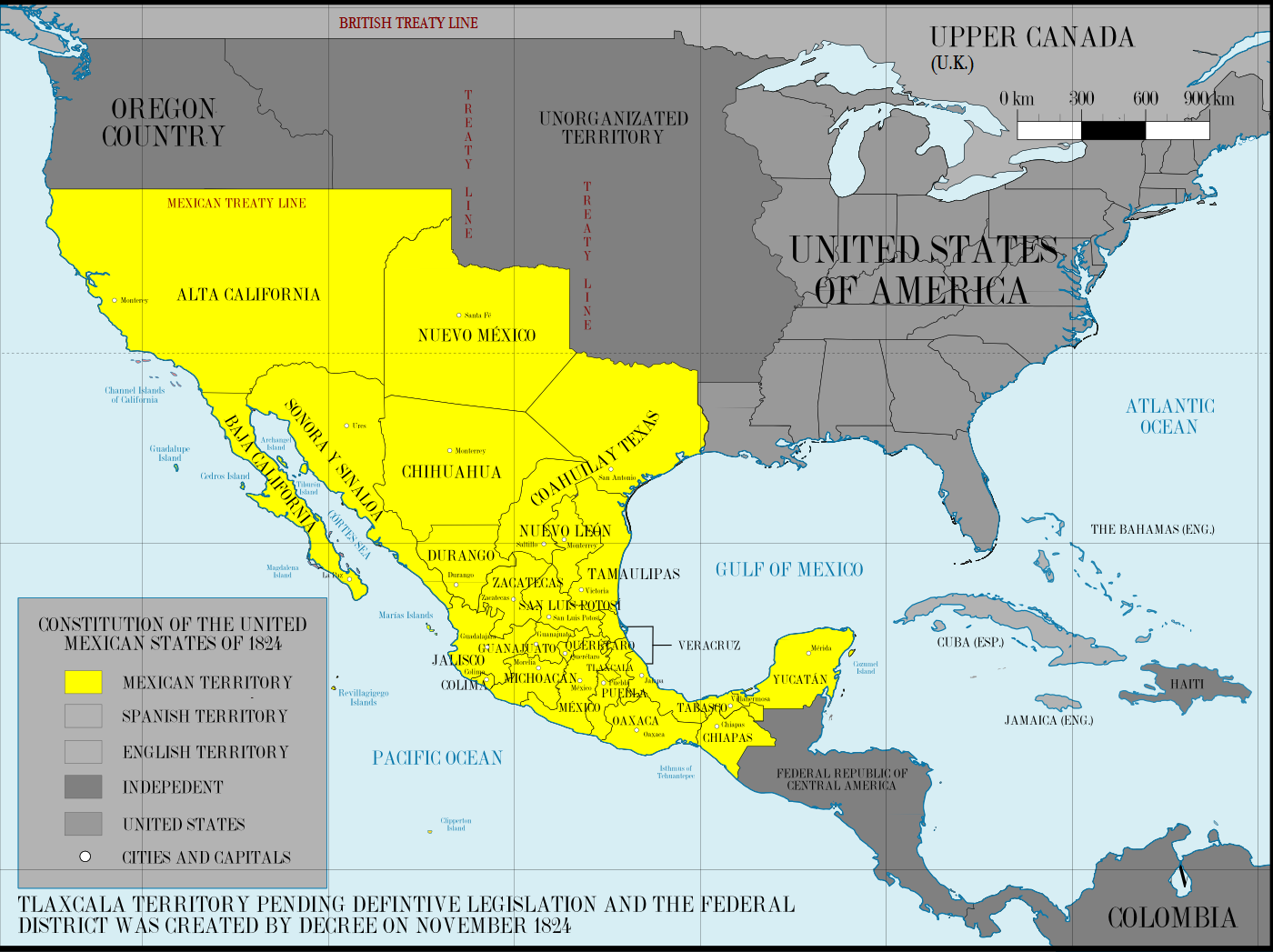
Mexico in 1824 with the boundary line with the U.S. from the 1818 Adams-Onís Treaty that Spain negotiated with the U.S.

In the Treaty of Guadalupe Hidalgo (1848) following the Mexican–American War (1845–48), Mexico ceded claims to what is now the Western and Southwestern United States to the United States (see Mexican Cession). The Cortina and Pizaña uprisings of 1859 and 1915 were influenced by irredentist ideas and the "proximity of the international boundary". The unsuccessful Pizaña uprising "was the last major armed protest on the part of Texas-Americans" (Tejanos). This 1915 uprising and the Plan of San Diego that preceded it marked the high point in Mexican irredentist sentiments.

In the early years of the Chicano Movement (El Movimiento) in the 1960s and 1970s, some movement figures "were political nationalists who advocated the secession of the Southwest from the Anglo republic of the United States of America, if not fully, at least locally with regard to Chicano self-determination in local governance, education and means of production". For example, in the 1970s, Reies Tijerina and his group La Alianza, espoused various separatist, secessionist, or irredentist beliefs. The Plan Espiritual de Aztlán, written during the First Chicano National Youth Conference in 1969, also stated "the fundamental Chicano nationalist goal of reclaiming Aztlán"—a reference to ancient Mexican myth—as "the rightful homeland of the Chicanos". However, "Most Chicano nationalists ... did not express the extreme desire for secession from the United States, and the nationalism they expressed weighed more heavily toward the broadly cultural than the explicitly political."

Today, there is virtually no Mexican American support for "separatist policies of self-determination". "Ethnonational irredentism by Mexicans in territories seized by the United States" following the Mexican–American War "declined after the failure of several attempted revolts at the end of the nineteenth century, in favor of internal ... struggles for immigrant and racial civil rights" in the United States. Neither the Mexican government nor any significant Mexican-American group "makes irredentist claims upon the United States". In the modern era, there "has been no evidence of irredentist sentiments among Mexican-Americans, even in such formerly Mexican territories as Southern California, ... nor of disloyalty to the United States, nor of active interest in the politics of Mexico".

=== South America ===
==== Colombia/Ecuador/Venezuela ====
Reunification of Gran Colombia refers to the hypothetical future reunification of Colombia, Venezuela, Ecuador, and Panama under a single government. Although Gran Colombia only existed for 12 years and dissolved in the 19th century, interest and efforts in reunification were expressed as early as 1903 when Panama separated from Colombia. People in favor of reunification are called "unionistas" or unionists. In 2008, President of Venezuela Hugo Chávez announced a proposal for the political restoration of Gran Colombia, under the Bolivarian Revolution.

== Border disputes related to irredentist claims ==
=== Afghanistan ===
The Afghan border with Pakistan, known as the Durand Line, was agreed to by Afghanistan and British India in 1893. The Pashtun tribes inhabiting the border areas were divided between what have become two nations; Afghanistan never accepted the still-porous border and clashes broke out in the 1950s and 1960s between Afghanistan and Pakistan over the issue. All Afghan governments of the past century have declared, with varying intensity, a long-term goal of reuniting all Pashtun-dominated areas under Afghan rule. No other country in the world accepts Afghanistan's unilateral claim that the Durand Line is in dispute. Afghan claims over Pakistani territory have detrimentally affected Afghanistan–Pakistan relations.

=== Estonia ===
Map of the Territorial changes of the Baltic states

After the Estonian War of Independence, the Republic of Estonia and Soviet Russia signed the Treaty of Tartu, giving Estonia ownership of Jaanilinn (modern-day Ivangorod) and Petseri (modern-day Pechory). However, in 1945, after the Soviet occupation of Estonia in 1940 took place, these areas were given to the Russian Soviet Federative Socialist Republic.

When Estonia regained independence in 1991, negotiations took place with Russia over these lost territories, Estonians argued that these territories should be returned to Estonia, as according to the Treaty of Tartu, which was the borders of the independent Estonia before the Soviet occupation. However, the Russians refused to return these territories, leading to a territorial dispute. In May 2005, the two countries signed a border treaty where Estonia agreed to concede these territories to Russia, and Estonia ratified the treaty, however also mentioned the Treaty of Tartu, which caused Russia to withdraw its signature, seeing it as an Estonian territorial claim. Negotiations continued in 2013, with an agreement on 18 February 2014 finally being signed. However, it is yet to be ratified by both parties, with ongoing political tensions.

However, there is significant sentiment in Estonia to reclaim these territories. The nationalist Conservative People's Party of Estonia has debated that the Treaty of Tartu must be included in the border treaty with Russia, being the treaty that legally established Estonia's independence and its borders, and that there is no political, economic or any other reasons for Estonia to ratify renouncing its claim over these territories. These territories are also claimed to avoid accepting the Soviet annexation of Estonia as legitimate, rather that Estonia was an occupied territory.

=== Korea ===
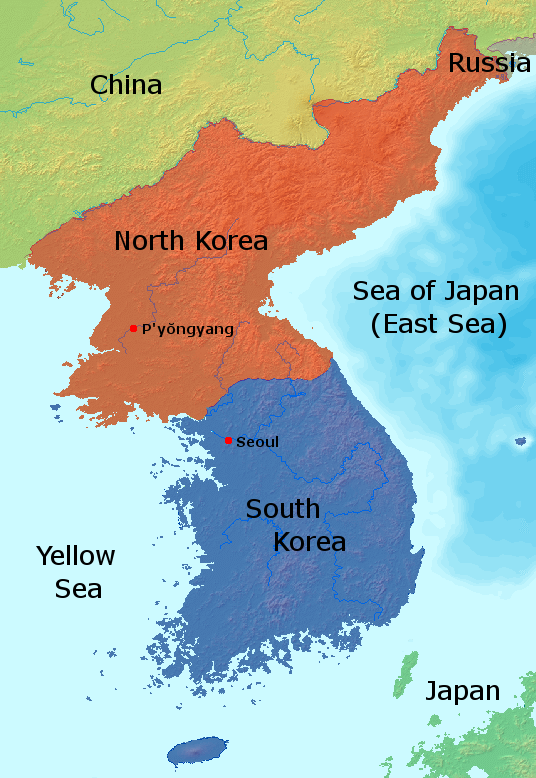
Map of the Korean Peninsula

Since their founding, both Korean states have disputed the legitimacy of the other. The Constitution of North Korea stresses the importance of reunification, but, while it makes no similar formal provision for administering the South, it effectively claims its territory as it does not diplomatically recognise the Republic of Korea, deeming it an "entity occupying the Korean territory".

South Korea's constitution also claims jurisdiction over the entire Korean peninsula. It acknowledges the division of Korea only indirectly by requiring the president to work for reunification. The Committee for the Five Northern Korean Provinces, established in 1949, is the South Korean authority charged with the administration of Korean territory north of the Military Demarcation Line (i.e., North Korea), and consists of the governors of the five provinces, who are appointed by the President. However the body is purely symbolic and largely tasked with dealing with Northern defectors; if reunification were to occur the committee would be dissolved and new administrators appointed by the Ministry of Unification.

=== Pakistan ===
Pakistan and India have from their independence sought to have the territory of Kashmir incorporated into them. Pakistan's and India's dispute over the territory of Kashmir stems from events leading up to independence from the British. Additionally, as of 2020, Pakistani maps lay claim to the territory of the former Princely State of Junagadh which acceded to Pakistan but was annexed into India following the Annexation of Junagadh.

== See also ==
- Ethnic nationalism
- Ethnic cleansing
- Identity politics
- Lebensraum
- Revanchism
- Status quo ante bellum
- Manifest destiny
- Historical powers

== Sources ==
- Fine, John V. A. (2010). When Ethnicity Did Not Matter in the Balkans: A Study of Identity in Pre-Nationalist Croatia, Dalmatia, and Slavonia in the Medieval and Early-Modern Periods. University of Michigan Press. ISBN 978-0-472-02560-2.
- Trencsényi, Balázs; Zászkaliczky, Márton (2010). Whose Love of Which Country?: Composite States, National Histories and Patriotic Discourses in Early Modern East Central Europe. BRILL. ISBN 978-90-04-18262-2.
