= Mujibnagar Memorial =

- মুজিবনগর স্মৃতিসৌধ
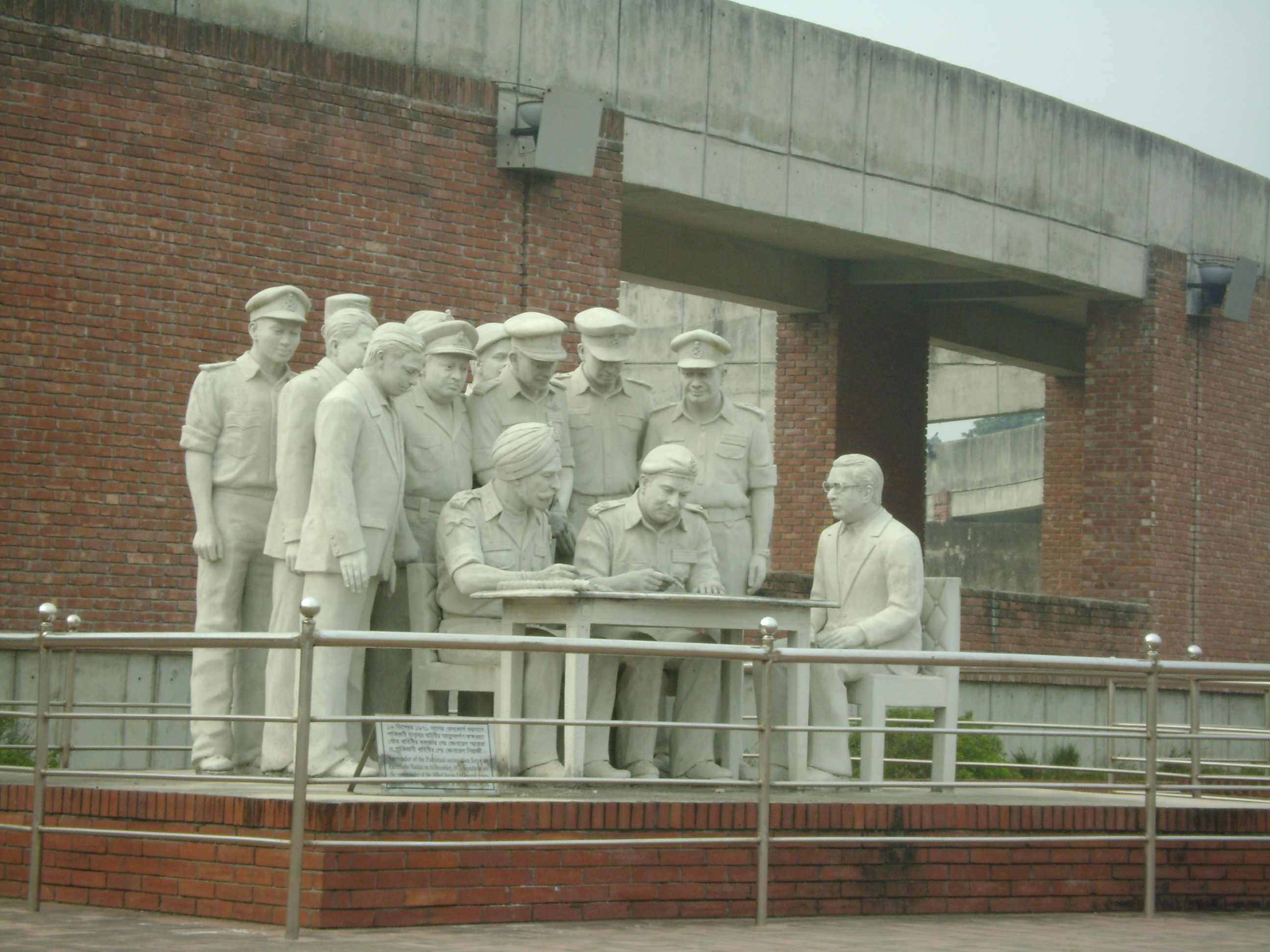
- Statue representing the signing of the Pakistani Instrument of Surrender at the Mujibnagar Memorial Monument and Complex
- Interactive map of the Mujibnagar Memorial area

General information
- Status: Completed
- Type: Public monument
- Location: Mujibnagar, Meherpur District, Bangladesh
- Coordinates: 23.647142°N 88.5935448°E
- Construction started: 1973
- Completed: 1987

Design and construction
- Architect: Tanveer Naquib
- Main contractor: M/s Everyday Engineering

Mujibnagar Memorial is located at Mujibnagar in Meherpur District. This memorial was built at the place where the Provisional Government of Bangladesh was formed during the Liberation War. Its architect is Tanveer Karim. Its construction work started in 1974 and completed in 1987. The Bangladesh government built a 23-level memorial to preserve the memory of independence. In 1996, first Hasina ministry started the construction of Mujibnagar Complex.

== Background ==
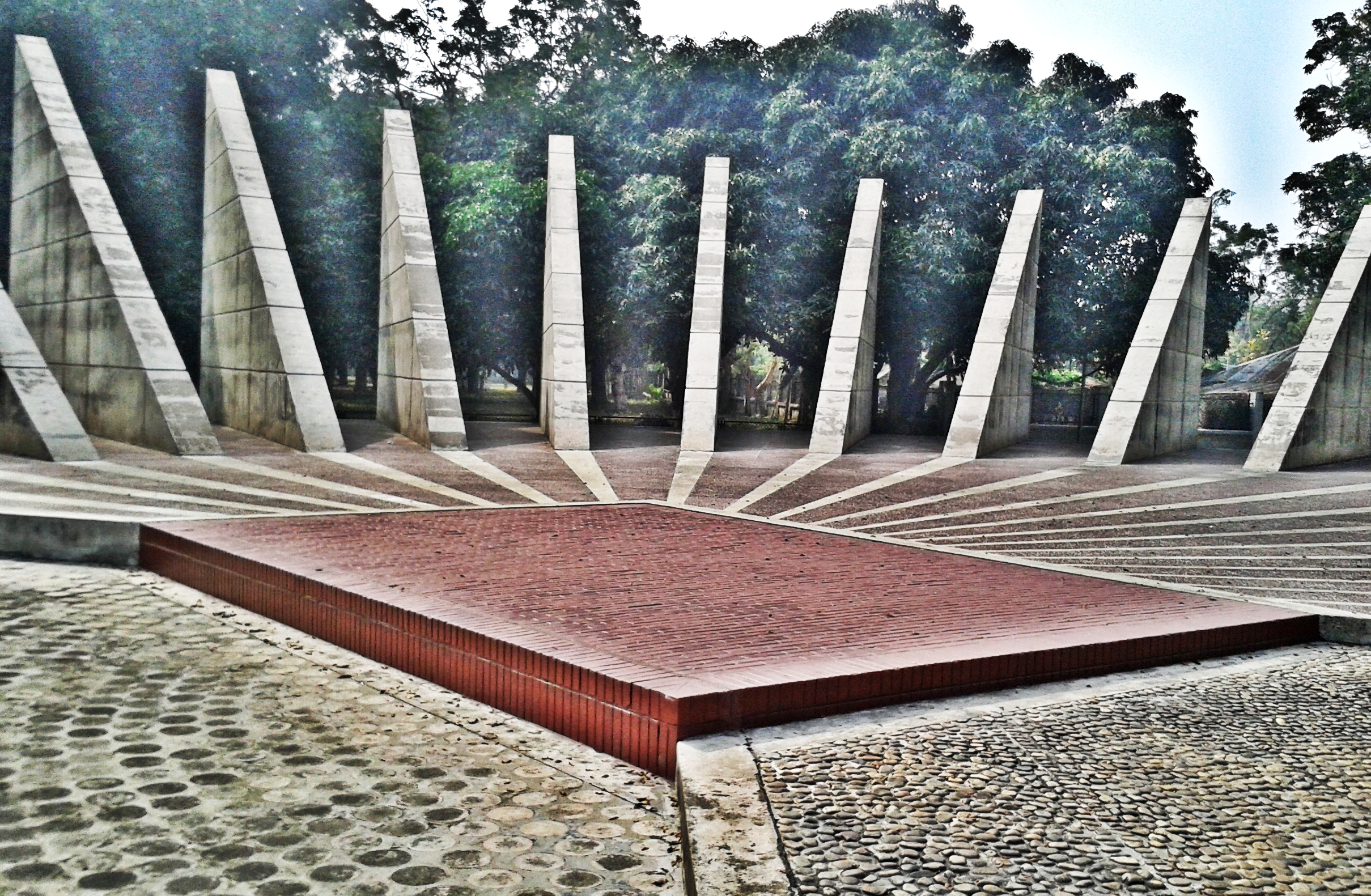
The Mujibnagar monument has 23 pillars, some of which are shown here, representing the 23 years of Pakistani rule over East Bengal before it became independent as Bangladesh. The red brick square marks the spot where the Mujibnagar government ministers took their oaths.

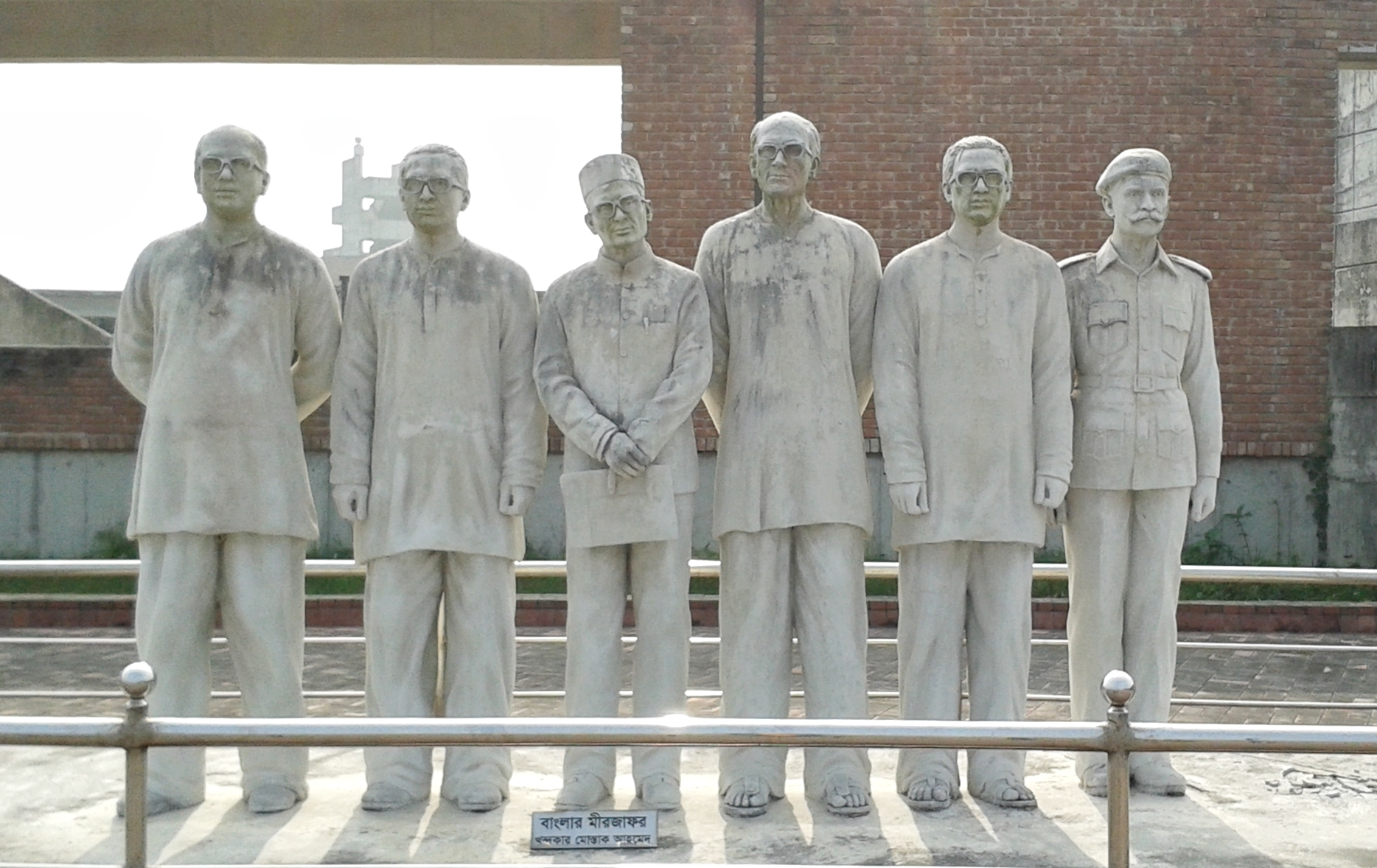
Sculpture of Cabinet members of the Provisional Government of Bangladesh; popularly known as Mujibnagar Government

Following the failure of last-ditch talks on the formation of a government, Pakistani president Yahya Khan ordered the Pakistani Army to launch Operation Searchlight to suppress the non-cooperation movement. On 25 March 1971, Sheikh Mujibur Rahman, the leader of the Awami League, signed an official declaration. and called upon the people to resist the occupation forces through a radio message.

In 10 April, Tajuddin Ahmed, M Amir-ul Islam, Sheikh Fazlul Haque Mani and others boarded an old Dakota plane borrowed from the government of India and set off in search of other cabinet members scattered around the borders. Flying at low altitudes, the plane stopped at various airstrips at the borders. After picking up cabinet members Muhammad Mansur Ali, Abdul Mannan, and Syed Nazrul Islam from various places on the way, in 11 April, the entourage arrived in Agartala, capital of the Indian state of Tripura, where many other Awami League leaders had taken refuge, including Khondaker Mostaq Ahmad and Colonel M. A. G. Osmani.

Reunited in Agartala, the Awami League leadership pondered the cabinet agenda and distributing cabinet offices. In the absence of president Sheikh Mujib, Syed Nazrul Islam served as acting president, Khondaker Mostaq Ahmad took the Ministry of Foreign Affairs, Abul Hasnat Muhammad Qamaruzzaman was given the State Minister's office, Mansur Ali the Finance Ministry, Abdul Mannan took his responsibility as the Minister-In-Charge of Information and Broadcasting Ministry, and M. A. G. Osmani, a retired veteran of the Pakistan army, was appointed commander-in-chief of the armed forces. The entire cabinet returned to Kolkata in 13 April, set to take oath at some yet unoccupied place in Bangladesh.

The oath taking ceremony took place in 17 April, at a village along the India–Bangladesh border, called Baidyanathtala, in Kushtia district (currently Meherpur district), on Bangladeshi soil. (Note: The exact site was a mango orchard, not far from the site of the Battle of Plassey, in which the British East India Company defeated the last independent Nawab of Bengal in 1757.) The ceremony was conducted by Abdul Mannan. Professor Muhammad Yusuf Ali read the proclamation of independence, drafted by Amir-ul Islam, an Awami League MNA-elect and barrister of the Dacca High Court, with the help of Subrata Roy Chowdhury, a barrister of the Calcutta High Court, retroactively in effect from 10 April. Answering a journalist during the ceremony, Tajuddin named the place Mujibnagar, after Sheikh Mujibur Rahman. Later the government-in-exile came to be popularly known as the Mujibnagar Government. Mujibnagar was abandoned quickly after the oath ceremony as participants feared a raid by Pakistani forces.

== Construction and development ==
After the independence of Bangladesh, on 31 August 1973, the third Mujib ministry decided to build a memorial at the place where the Mujibnagar government was sworn in. Its construction work was inaugurated on 17 April 1974, but the work was stopped due to the assassination of Sheikh Mujibur Rahman. In 1986, an allocation of ৳20 million was made to continue the construction work, which M/s Everyday Engineering was appointed to carry out. On 17 April 1987, the then president Hussain Muhammad Ershad inaugurated the memorial. Later, the first Hasina ministry built a library, mosque and guest house here to convert it into a memorial complex. It was designed by Tanveer Naquib. Total of ৳140 million have been spent on the implementation of the entire project.

== Layout and architecture ==
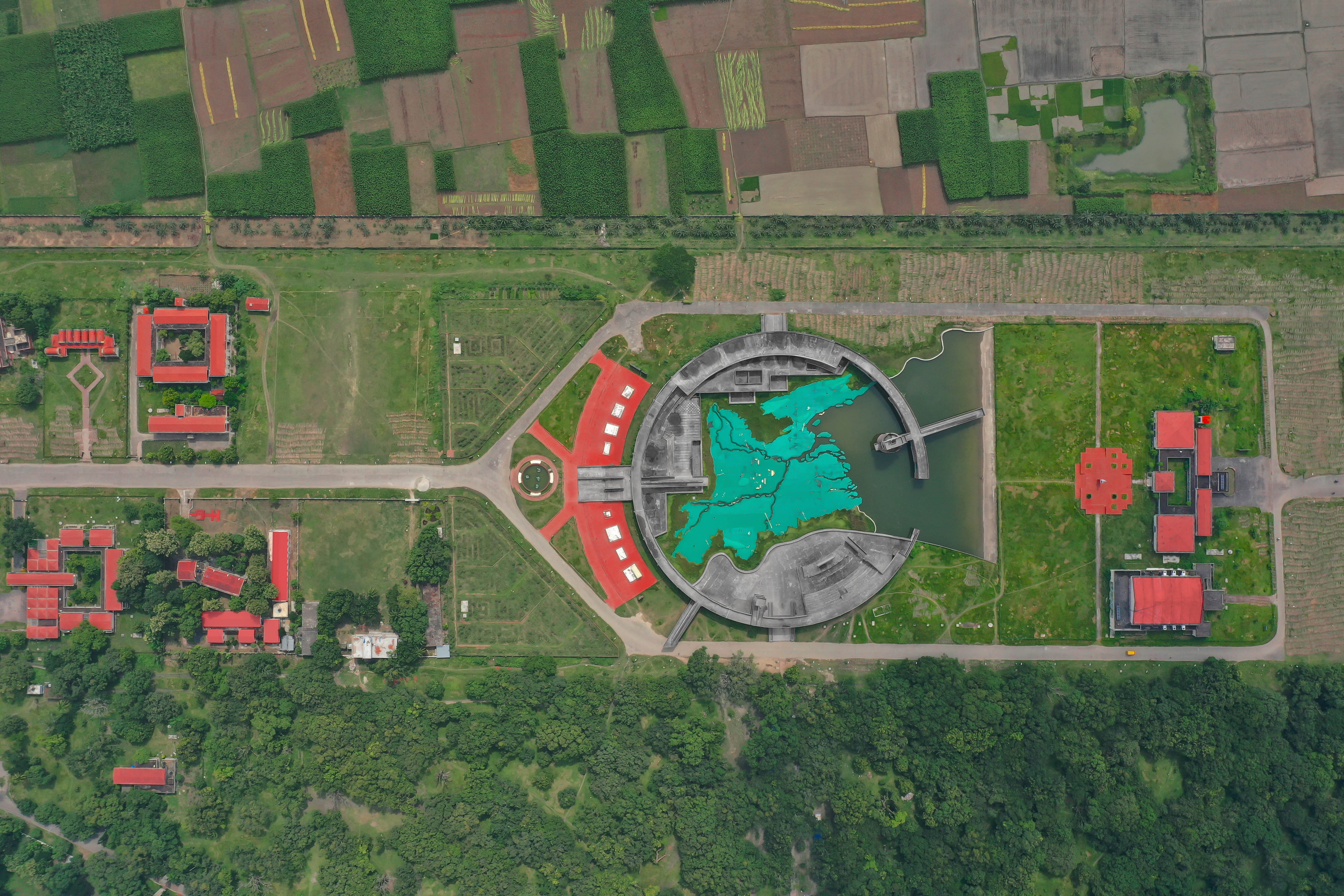
Aerial view of the memorial

The complex covers an area of 20.1 acres with a 106.68 cm high altar topped by a monument with 23 triangular pillars denoting the 23-year rule of the government of Pakistan in Bangladesh. Many circles are placed in a part of the altar to symbolize the people who died in the liberation war of Bangladesh and the pebbles placed on the altar indicate the freedom fighters who participated in the war. A red altar has been erected at the spot where the provisional government was sworn in. To get to the altar, one has to climb nine steps which represent the nine months of the war. Another high altar located here contains many round shapes that symbolize the skulls of the ten million people who died in the 1971 killing of Bengali intellectuals. The stone carvings on the platform and memorial represent the symbol of the unity of the people of East Pakistan at that time. There are six tiered flower gardens that symbolize the six point movement. The sculptures installed here depict various events during the war.

== Tourism ==
Located in Meherpur District, the memorial is a major tourist attraction of the district. Every year tourists from the country and abroad come to see it. Mujibnagar Day is celebrated here every year.

== Incidents ==
During the 2024 Bangladesh post-resignation violence, a group of miscreants attacked the complex, damaging 600 sculptures and looting the complex's property.

== See also ==
- List of national monuments of Bangladesh

== Sources ==
- Imam, H T (2010). বাংলাদেশ সরকার ১৯৭১ [Bangladesh Government 1971] (in Bengali) (3rd ed.). Dhaka: Agamee Prakashani. ISBN 9789844017832.
- Hasan, Muyeedul (1986). মূলধারা '৭১ [Mainstream '71] (in Bengali) (2nd ed.). Dhaka: The University Press Limited. ISBN 9789848815632.
- Rahman, Hasan Hafizur, ed. (1982). "প্রথম অধ্যায়: ১২: কলিকাতাস্থ পাকিস্তানী ডেপুটি হাই কমিশনারের বাংলাদেশের পক্ষাবলম্বন" [First Chapter: 12: Pakistani Deputy High Commissioner in Kolkata Switches Allegiance to Bangladesh]. বাংলাদেশের স্বাধীনতা যুদ্ধ: দলিলপত্র [History of Bangladesh War of Independence: Documents] (PDF). Vol. 3. Dhaka: Ministry of Information, Government of the People's Republic of Bangladesh. pp. 30–32. ISBN 9844330912.
- Islam, Barrister Amir-ul (1985). "৯: ব্যারিস্টার আমিরুল ইসলাম (সাক্ষাৎকার)" [9: Barrister Amir-ul Islam (Interview)]. In —— (ed.). বাংলাদেশের স্বাধীনতা যুদ্ধ: দলিলপত্র [History of Bangladesh War of Independence: Documents] (PDF) (in Bengali). Vol. 15. Dhaka: Ministry of Information, Government of the People's Republic of Bangladesh. pp. 51–110. ISBN 9844330912.
- Hossain, Doctor Kamal (1985). "১৮: ডক্টর কামাল হোসেন (সাক্ষাৎকার)" [18: Doctor Kamal Hossain (Interview)]. In —— (ed.). বাংলাদেশের স্বাধীনতা যুদ্ধ: দলিলপত্র [History of Bangladesh War of Independence: Documents] (PDF). Vol. 15. Dhaka: Ministry of Information, Government of the People's Republic of Bangladesh. pp. 143–193. ISBN 9844330912.
- Sobhan, Rehman (1985). "৩৬: রেহমান সোবহান (সাক্ষাৎকার)" [36: Rehman Sobhan (Interview)]. In —— (ed.). বাংলাদেশের স্বাধীনতা যুদ্ধ: দলিলপত্র [History of Bangladesh War of Independence: Documents] (PDF). Vol. 15. Dhaka: Ministry of Information, Government of the People's Republic of Bangladesh. pp. 263–293. ISBN 9844330912.
- Anisuzzaman (1997). আমার একাত্তর [My Seventy-One (Memoir)] (in Bengali). Dhaka: Sahitya Prakash. ISBN 9844651255.
- Khan, Faruq Aziz (2014). Spring 1971. Dhaka: Agamee Prakashani. ISBN 9789840416332.
- Karim, S. A. (2005). Sheikh Mujib: Triumph and Tragedy. Dhaka: The University Press Limited. ISBN 9789845061537.
- Ahmad, Mohiuddin (2014). জাসদের উত্থান পতন: অস্থির সময়ের রাজনীতি [Rise and Fall of JSD: Politics in the Time of Turmoil] (in Bengali) (10th ed.). Dhaka: Prothoma Prokashan. ISBN 9789849074755.
