= Mahbub Uddin Ahmed =

Mahbub Uddin Ahmed Bir Bikram
- Native name: মাহবুব উদ্দিন আহমেদ
- Allegiance: Bangladesh
- Branch: East Pakistan Police / Bangladesh Forces
- Service years: 1971
- Conflicts: Bangladesh Liberation War
- Awards: Bir Bikram

Mahbub Uddin Ahmed is a veteran of the Bangladesh Liberation War and a former police officer. He is known for leading the guard of honour at the swearing-in ceremony of the Mujbnagar government, the wartime government of Bangladesh. He was awarded the third-highest gallantry award of Bangladesh, Bir Bikrom.

== Career ==
At the start of the Bangladesh Liberation War in 1971, Ahmed served as the police chief of the Jhenaidah sub-division.

Ahmed joined the armed struggle after the war began and was crucial in assisting senior leaders, including Tajuddin Ahmad and Amir-ul Islam, in crossing into India for diplomatic support.

Ahmed is best known for presenting the guard of honour to acting president Syed Nazrul Islam at the historic Mujibnagar oath-taking ceremony on 17 April 1971. The day is commemorated as Mujibnagar Day.

A road in Chaklapara, Jhenaidah, was named after Ahmed. He unveiled the plaque on 29 November 2020, recalling memories of the war alongside family members, veterans, local Awami League leaders and public representatives.
