= Provisional Government of Bangladesh =

1st Government of Bangladesh (1971–1972)

Provisional Cabinet of Bangladesh
- 1st Council of Ministers of Bangladesh
- 10 April 1971 – 12 January 1972
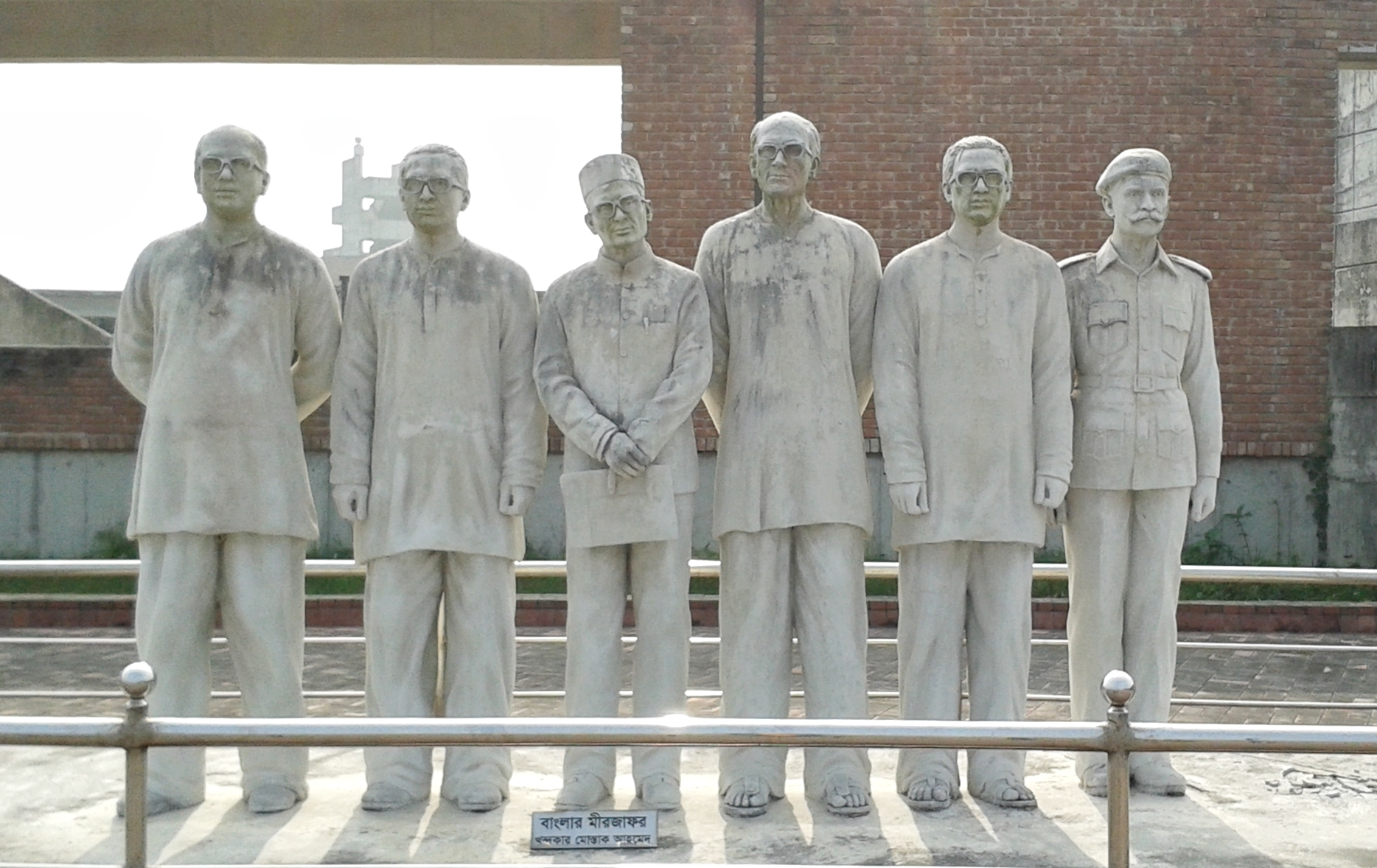
- Sculpture of the cabinet members of the Provisional Government of Bangladesh at Mujibnagar
- Date formed: 10 April 1971
- Date dissolved: 12 January 1972

People and organisations
- President: Sheikh Mujibur Rahman; Syed Nazrul Islam (Acting)
- Prime minister: Tajuddin Ahmad
- Member parties: Bangladesh Awami League

History
- Predecessor: Monem II
- Successor: Mujib I

The Provisional Government of Bangladesh, (Note: Bengali: অস্থায়ী বাংলাদেশ সরকার, romanized: Ôsthaẏi Baṅladeś Sôrkar) popularly known as the Mujibnagar Government (Note: মুজিবনগর সরকার, Mujibnôgôr Sôrkar), or the Bangladeshi government-in-exile, was the first and founding government of Bangladesh that was established following the proclamation of independence of East Pakistan as Bangladesh on 10 April 1971.

Headed by prime minister Tajuddin Ahmad, it was the supreme leadership of the liberation movement, comprising a cabinet, a diplomatic corps, an assembly, an armed force, and a radio service. It operated as a government-in-exile from Kolkata. The president was Sheikh Mujibur Rahman. Syed Nazrul Islam became the acting president in his absence.

After the 1970 general election, the military administration of Pakistan failed to hand over power to the elected legislators. When the Pakistan Army launched operations against separatists, the elected political leadership of East Pakistan declared independence and founded the provisional government with the support of the Government of India. Its cabinet took oath on 17 April 1971 in the town of Mujibnagar. It attracted many defectors from the Pakistani civil, diplomatic and military services and many leading intellectuals and cultural figures from East Pakistan.

The Mujibnagar government coordinated the war efforts of the Mukti Bahini and the nascent Bangladesh Armed Forces. It had its own postal service. Its public relations strategy featured a widely popular radio station known as Swadhin Bangla Betar Kendra. It coordinated with the Government of India in conducting the armed resistance against the Pakistan army and also addressing the refugee crisis. It also undertook an international campaign to garner support for Bangladesh's independence, calling for stopping the genocide and preventing a refugee crisis. It appointed special envoys and operated representative missions in New Delhi, Washington, D.C., and London among many other cities.

== Background ==
The 1970 general election, the first of its kind in Pakistan after years of military rule, was held on 7 December 1970. The Awami League, led by Sheikh Mujibur Rahman, secured 160 out of 300 seats, becoming the majority in the National Assembly. With the elections concluded, president Yahya Khan was to inaugurate the National Assembly, and the elected legislators were to draft a new constitution. With the Awami League being in the majority in the assembly, there remained no obstacle to writing a constitution that complied with the six points demand. As a result, anxiety among the West Pakistani opposition parties and the military junta was on the rise.

On 1 March 1971, Yahya Khan postponed the inaugural session of the National Assembly on 3 March, indefinitely. According to him, "it was imperative to give more time to the political leaders to arrive at a reasonable understanding on the issue of Constitution making". Sheikh Mujib immediately called for non-cooperation by his people, effectively taking control of East Pakistan. Mujib kept issuing regular directives to people and party workers. Non-cooperation was an immediate success; people spontaneously defied a curfew imposed by the Army. On 3 March, Yahya Khan announced a round table conference would be held in Dhaka on 10 March to settle the disputes over the constitution. On 7 March, however, in a speech in front of a massive gathering, Sheikh Mujib called for an indefinite general strike, asking his people to be prepared for any emergency and issued an ultimatum to the junta.

On 15 March, Yahya Khan arrived in Dhaka and met Mujib the next day. A series of meetings took place between them until late March. At Yahya's insistence, Zulfikar Ali Bhutto, leader of the West Pakistani opposition party (PPP), joined them from 21 March. Mujib assured Yahya that his party would not harm West Pakistan's interests. During those talks, news of war preparations in East Pakistan reached the Awami League leadership. Troops and arms were being concentrated from West Pakistan. Mujib urged Yahya to stop the reinforcements, warning him of the consequences. The Awami League leadership expected that on 24 March final negotiations would take place, however, that day passed with no meeting. On 25 March they learned that Yahya's delegation had secretly left Dhaka, leaving the discussions unfinished, killing any hope for a peaceful settlement.

Sheikh Mujib kept ordering his workers to escape to safety. Mujib refused to escape until 25 March, fearing it would be used as a pretext to massacre innocent Pakistanis. On 25 March, the night Yahya secretly left Dhaka and the Pakistan Army cracked down on the Bangladeshi population there, killing thousands of people. Like the entire nation, the Awami League's leadership was taken by surprise; they scattered, each busy finding their own path to safety, and losing contact with one another for a few days.

It was known days later that Sheikh Mujib had been arrested on the night of 25 March. Before his arrest, he broadcast the independence of Bangladesh in a radio message.

== Formation ==
Following the Pakistan Army crackdown on 25 March, Awami League leaders Tajuddin Ahmad, general secretary of the party, and M Amir-ul Islam escaped Dhaka and crossed the Indian border on 30 March. They were received at the border outpost by the regional head of the Indian Border Security Force (BSF), Golok Majumdar. Majumdar immediately transported them to Kolkata with him. There, on the night of 30 March and the next day, Tajuddin and Amir had discussions with BSF chief Khusro Faramurz Rustamji, who had come from Delhi after learning of their arrival. On 1 April, Tajuddin and Islam, accompanied by Majumdar, left for Delhi aboard a military cargo plane.

In Delhi, Tajuddin met with India's Prime Minister Indira Gandhi, on 4 April. At their second meeting the following day, Gandhi informed him that Sheikh Mujib had been arrested and transported to Pakistan though Pakistan had not made this official yet. Asked about the Bangladesh government, he replied, having consulted with Amir-ul Islam the day before, that a provisional government had been formed with Sheikh Mujib as its president with the senior Awami League leaders who had attended the Mujib-Yahya talks as cabinet members. Tajuddin presented himself as the prime minister. Except for Sheikh Mujib, the whereabouts of the other members was unknown. Two crucial resolutions were reached in that meeting: India opened its borders to Bangladeshi refugees saving millions of lives in the upcoming days when Pakistani aggression reached outside major cities, and India allowed the Bangladesh Government to operate within Indian territory. The Indian government also promised to help the Bangladeshi liberation war by any means possible.

While Tajuddin was in Delhi, part of the Awami League leadership congregated in Kolkata. Many of them, notably the youth and student leaders, viewed Tajuddin's meeting with the Indian prime minister as an outrageous act side-lining them. (Note: As a contingency plan, the Awami League leadership was supposed to meet at the house of a former Awami League worker settled in Kolkata named Chittaranjan Sutar. Before leaving for Delhi, Tajuddin asked his BSF hosts to find Sutar's address to no avail. Tajuddin had to leave without contacting him. This added to the youth leaders' suspicions.) On returning to Kolkata, on 8 April, Tajuddin found and met the group of leaders, including Abul Hasnat Muhammad Qamaruzzaman, and informed them of the Delhi meeting's outcomes, including the provisional government. Some of the leadership present there questioned Tajuddin's legitimacy as prime minister. The youth leader Sheikh Mani rejected the idea of the cabinet outright. Instead, he proposed setting up a revolutionary council dedicated to conducting armed resistance only. Amir-ul Islam explained the inadequacy of the revolutionary council and the necessity of a legal government. After this, and following Qamaruzzaman's mediation, most of the leadership at the meeting accepted Tajuddin's proposal.

On 10 April, Tajuddin, Amir-ul Islam, Sheikh Mani and others boarded an old Douglas C-47 Skytrain plane borrowed from the Indian government and set off in search of other cabinet members scattered around the borders. Flying at low altitudes, the plane stopped at various airstrips at the borders. After picking up cabinet members Muhammad Mansur Ali, Abdul Mannan, and Syed Nazrul Islam from various places on the way, on 11 April, the entourage arrived in Agartala, capital of the Indian state of Tripura, where many other Awami League leaders had taken refuge, including Khondaker Mostaq Ahmad and Colonel M. A. G. Osmani.

Reunited in Agartala, the Awami League leadership pondered the cabinet agenda and distributing cabinet offices. In the absence of President Sheikh Mujib, Syed Nazrul Islam served as acting president, Khondaker Mostaq took the Ministry of Foreign Affairs, Qamarauzzaman was given the State Minister's office, Mansur Ali the Finance Ministry, Abdul Mannan took his responsibility as the Minister-In-Charge of Information and Broadcasting Ministry, and Osmani, a retired veteran of the Pakistan army, was appointed commander-in-chief of the armed forces. The entire cabinet returned to Kolkata on 13 April, set to take oath at some yet unoccupied place in Bangladesh.

The oath taking ceremony took place on 17 April, at a village along the India-Bangladesh border, called Baidyanathtala, in Kushtia district (currently Meherpur district), on Bangladeshi soil. (Note: The exact site was a mango orchard, not far from the site of the Battle of Plassey, in which the British East India Company defeated the last independent Nawab of Bengal in 1757.) The ceremony was conducted by Abdul Mannan. Professor Muhammad Yusuf Ali read the proclamation of independence, drafted by Amir-ul Islam, an Awami League MNA-elect and barrister of the Dacca High Court, with the help of Subrata Roy Chowdhury, a barrister of the Calcutta High Court, retroactively in effect from 10 April. Answering a journalist during the ceremony, Tajuddin named the place Mujibnagar, after Sheikh Mujibur Rahman. Later the government-in-exile came to be popularly known as the Mujibnagar Government. Mujibnagar was abandoned quickly after the oath ceremony as participants feared a raid by Pakistani forces. The government settled in Kolkata, in exile, for the rest of the war—briefly at a house on Ballyganj Circular Road and then at 8 Theatre Road.

== Constitution ==
The proclamation of independence issued on 10 April served as the interim constitution of Bangladesh until 1972 and provided the legal basis of the provisional government. It declared that as Pakistan has failed to convene its elected legislators for framing a new constitution on 3 March and instead launched an "unjust and treacherous war", Sheikh Mujibur Rahman, had fulfilled aspirations for self-determination by declaring independence of Bangladesh on 26 March:

Whereas in the facts and circumstances of such treacherous conduct Bangabandhu Sheikh Mujibur Rahman, the undisputed leader of the 75 million people of Bangladesh, in due fulfilment of the legitimate right of self-determination of the people of Bangladesh, duly made a declaration of independence at Dacca on March 26, 1971, and urged the people of Bangladesh to defend the honour of and integrity of Bangladesh

The proclamation declared formation of a constituent assembly, consisting of the elected legislators, and Bangladesh as a people's republic with "equality, human dignity and social justice" as its fundamental principles:

We the elected representatives of the people of Bangladesh, as honour bound by the mandate given to us by the people of Bangladesh whose will is supreme duly constituted ourselves into a Constituent Assembly, and having held mutual consultations, and in order to ensure for the people of Bangladesh equality, human dignity and social justice declare and constitute Bangladesh to be sovereign Peoples' Republic and thereby confirm the declaration of independence already made by Bangabandhu Sheikh Mujibur Rahman.

== Government headquarters ==
According to prime minister Tajuddin's secretary Faruq Aziz Khan:

The prime minister had a small office room no bigger than 10'x10'. A small secretariat table and a few chairs were all the furniture the PM's office had. An iron chest and a steel cabinet occupied most of the space of this little room ... Behind this room there was a bigger room about 25'x20' in size which was the PM's bed room cum sitting and dining room, all combined in one.

The other wing of the building which had almost similar accommodation was occupied by the commander-in-chief of the army Col. M.A.G. Osmani while the upper floor was occupied by some M.N.As and M.Ps as a kind of a hostel. It also housed the offices of the acting president Syed Nazrul Islam, finance minister M. Mansoor Ali and home minister Mr. Qamruzzaman.

== Cabinet ==
The following lists is the president, the vice-president, the prime minister and the cabinet members of provisional government of Bangladesh.

Portfolio	Minister	Took office	Left office	
President	Sheikh Mujibur Rahman	10 April 1971 (Took oath on 10 January 1972)	12 January 1972	AL
Vice President and Acting President	Syed Nazrul Islam	10 April 1971	12 January 1972	AL
Prime Minister and also in-charge of꞉: Cabinet Division; Ministry of Defence; Information and Radio; Establishment Division; Planning and Economic affairs	Tajuddin Ahmad	10 April 1971	12 January 1972	AL
Chief of the Bangladesh Forces	General M. A. G. Osmani	12 April 1971	6 April 1972	Independent
Ministry of Finance, Commerce, Industries and Posts, Telecommunications and Information Technology and Labour, Business	Muhammad Mansur Ali	10 April 1971	12 January 1972	AL
Ministry of Foreign Affairs	Khondaker Mostaq Ahmad	10 April 1971	29 December 1971	AL
Ministry of Foreign Affairs	Abdus Samad Azad	29 December 1971	12 January 1972	AL
Ministry of Law, Justice and Parliamentary Affairs	Khondaker Mostaq Ahmad	10 April 1971	12 January 1972	AL
Ministry of Home Affairs and Relief and Rehabilitation	Abul Hasnat Muhammad Qamaruzzaman	10 April 1971	12 January 1972	AL
Ministry of Road Transport and Bridges	Sheikh Abdul Aziz	27 December 1971	12 January 1972	AL
Ministry of Food, Agriculture, Local Government, Rural Development and Co-operatives	Phani Bhushan Majumder	27 December 1971	12 January 1972	AL
Ministry of Health, Employment, Social Welfare and Family Planning	Zahur Ahmad Chowdhury	27 December 1971	12 January 1972	AL
Ministry of Education, Cultural Affairs, Housing, Public Works, Power, Petroleum and Irrigational Affairs	Muhammad Yusuf Ali	28 December 1971	12 January 1972	AL

Divisions/departments:

1. Cabinet Secretariat
2. General Administration Department
3. Relief and Rehabilitation Department
4. Parliamentary Affairs Division
5. Agriculture Department
6. Engineering Department
7. Chief Martial Law Administration Department

Autonomous bodies:

1. Planning Commission
2. Board of Trade and Commerce
3. Board of Control, Youth and Reception Camps
4. Relief and Rehabilitation Committee
5. Evacuee Welfare Board

=== Parliament ===
The interim constitution converted Bengali members of Pakistan's national and provincial assemblies elected in the 1970 general election into members of the Constituent Assembly of Bangladesh.

=== Administration ===
On 2 June, Bangladesh was divided into five administrative units, called Zonal Administrative Council, governed by elected legislators. On an order (GA/810/345) issued by the prime minister on 27 July the number of zonal councils was increased to 9 and their functions were formalized. On another order (GA/7366/500), issued on 18 September, the number was increased to eleven. The administrative zones were headquartered in Indian territories bordering the zones. The administrative zones were the following:

No.	Zone	Headquarter	Jurisdiction	Chairman
1	South-East Zone I	Sabroom	1. Chittagong; 2. Chittagong Hill Tracts; 3. Feni sub-division of Noakhali District	Nurul Islam Chowdhury
2	South-East Zone II	Agartala	1. Dacca; 2. Comilla; 3. Noakhali district except Feni sub-division	Zahur Ahmed Chowdhury
3	East Zone	Dharmanagar	1. Habiganj and Moulvibazar sub-divisions of Sylhet district	M. A. Rab
4	North-East Zone I	Dawki	1. Sadar and Sunamganj sub-divisions of Sylhet district	Dewan Farid Gazi
5	North-East Zone II	Tura	1. Mymensingh; 2. Tangail	Shamsur Rahman Khan Shahjahan
6	North Zone	Coochbehar	1. Rangpur	Matiur Rahman
7	West Zone I	Balurghat	1. Dinajpur; 2. Bogra	Abdur Rahim
8	West Zone II	Maldah	1. Rajshahi	Ashraful Islam
9	South-West Zone I	Krishnanagar	1. Pabna; 2. Kushtia	Abdur Rauf Chowdhury
10	South-West Zone II	Bangaon	1. Faridpur; 2. Jessore	Phani Bhushan Majumder
11	South Zone	Barasat	1. Barishal; 2. Patuakhali	M A Momen

The following officers were appointed to each zone by the government:

1. Zonal Health Officer
2. Zonal Education Officer
3. Zonal Relief Officer
4. Zonal Engineer
5. Zonal Police Officer
6. Zonal Information Officer
7. Zonal Accounts Officer

=== Armed forces ===
Since mid-March, during the Mujib-Yahya talks, East Bengal troops were being disarmed and senior East Bengal's armed forces officers were being transferred on various pretexts. As the war broke out, East Bengal soldiers serving in various Pakistan Army battalions had revolted and raised an armed resistance against Pakistan forces all over East Bangla immediately. Rebel commanders of these battalions, mostly junior officers, unaware of the establishment of a provisional government, met along with Colonel Osmani on 4 April. At that meeting, the Bangladesh Forces, was formed, with Colonel Osmani as its Commander-in-Chief. A provisional command structure and operation plan was adopted until a government could be formed. Prime Minister Tajuddin learned of the Bangladesh Forces while he was in New Delhi. In his 10 April radio speech he uniformly granted it official recognition. Subsequently, Lt. Colonel M. A. Rab took over as the Chief of Staff of Land Forces (Army). During August 1971 Group Captain A K Khandker took over as his Deputy. After November 21, 1971, Khandkar was entitled as Deputy Chief of Staff of Army (Liaison).

Office	Office Holder
Commander-in-Chief of Bangladesh Forces (Bangladesh Forces)	Colonel M.A.G Osmani
Principal Military Representative Provincial Government (Guerrilla Training)	Squadron Leader M. Hamidullah Khan, TJ, SH
Chief of Staff (Army)	Lieutenant Colonel M. A. Rab
Deputy Chief of Staff (Liaison)	Group Captain A K Khandker

Initially, the Bangladesh Forces consisted of the remnants of the five regular battalions of the East Bengal Regiment (EBR) of the Pakistan Army: 1, 3, and 8 (commanded by Major Ziaur Rahman HJ); 2 (commanded by Major K M Shafiullah); 4 (commanded by Major Khaled Mosharraf). In July, Osmani amalgamated the 3 battalions under Ziaur Rahman's command into a brigade, called 'Z-force'. Similarly, in August–September, two more brigades, 'S-force' and 'K-force', and 3 more battalions for them (9, 10, and 11 EBRs) were partially raised.

Able aged citizens from across the land throughout many locations also raised armed resistance. Unable to overcome the Pakistan forces' onslaught, owing mainly to lack of heavy arms and manpower, both resistances soon retreated into Indian territory. As Pakistan land forces spread around the country, thousands of men from many parts of occupied Bangladesh crossed the border into India, seeking arms and training to join the fight against the Pakistan occupation force.

In the mid-July (11 to 17) conference of the BDF sector commanders at the Bangladesh Government's headquarters on Theatre Road in Kolkata, the regular force, comprising the rebel Bengali soldiers from the Pakistan Army and the EPR, was named "Regular Force" (popularly called Mukti Fouj) and the irregular guerrilla warriors were named Gono Bahini (popularly called Muktijoddha or "Freedom Fighter"). The sectors were also reorganized.

The Bangladesh Independence war guerrillas were based in camps on the East Pakistan-India border. On 21 November, it joined Indian forces as part of a combined Bangladesh-Indian allied offensive against Pakistan, which resulted in victory.

=== Bureaucracy ===
Many Bengali members of the Civil Service of Pakistan defected to the government of Bangladesh. Kamal Uddin Siddiqui, Noorul Quader, S. A. Samad, Khandaker Asaduzzaman, Saadat Husain and Akbar Ali Khan were early leaders of the newly formed Bangladesh Civil Service. Moudud Ahmed served as Postmaster General. The provisional government established an elaborate structure of administrative departments. Muhammad Yusuf Ali and J. G. Bhowmik served as the chief Relief Commissioners for Bangladeshi refugees. The noted artist Quamrul Hassan served as Director of Art and Design. Kolkata and Agartala were the main centres of the government-in-exile.

=== Diplomacy ===
On 15 April, before the Mujibnagar Cabinet took oath, Prime Minister Tajuddin Ahmed secretly met Hossain Ali, the Deputy High Commissioner of Pakistan in Kolkata. Tajuddin persuaded Ali, along with his Bengali staff, to switch allegiance to the Bangladesh government the day after the cabinet took their oaths. As promised, Ali and 70 employees at the Deputy High Commission swore allegiance to the Bangladesh Government, turning the Pakistan High Commission on 9 Circus Avenue into the Bangladesh Mission in Kolkata for good. The mission came to house part of the government's offices, most importantly, the Ministry of Foreign Affairs.

In early April, Tajuddin commissioned economist Rehman Sobhan to stop the economic advisor to Yahya Khan, economist Mirza Muzaffar Ahmad, from acquiring fresh foreign aid for Pakistan and persuade Bangladeshi officials serving at Pakistani foreign missions to switch allegiance to Bangladesh. In late May, Tajuddin charged journalist Muyeedul Hasan with communicating with the Indian political groups and also establishing liaison with the USSR.

Name	Title	Mission
Humayun Rashid Choudhury	Ambassador-at-Large	New Delhi
Abul Maal Abdul Muhith	Ambassador-at-Large	Washington D.C.
Rehman Sobhan	Special Envoy	Washington D.C.
Justice Abu Sayeed Chowdhury	Chief Overseas Representative	London
Abul Fateh	Ambassador-at-Large	Calcutta

=== Cultural wing ===
In May, Swadhin Bangla Betar Kendra, the official radio service of the Government of Bangladesh, began operating with a transmitter allotted by the Indian government. It served as the cultural propaganda wing of the Bangladeshi provisional government.

== Advisory Council ==
During the Liberation War of 1971, the Mujibnagar Government formed an Advisory Council. This council mainly assisted the government in policy-making, international relations, and in formulating military and political strategies. The committee was composed of 8 members from 5 political parties.

Members of the Advisory Council
No.	Position	Name	Political Party
1	Chairman	Maulana Bhashani	National Awami Party (Bhashani)
2	Member	Tajuddin Ahmad	Awami League
3	Member	Moni Singh	Communist Party of Bangladesh
4	Member	Muzaffar Ahmed	National Awami Party (Muzaffar)
5	Member	Manoranjan Dhar	Bangladesh National Congress
6	Member	Khondaker Mostaq Ahmad	Awami League
7	Member	Awami League Representative	Awami League
8	Member	Awami League Representative	Awami League

== Conduct of war ==
Pakistan was diplomatically assisting its ally the United States in its rapprochement with Communist China. India as a non-aligned under the premiership of its first prime minister Jawaharlal Nehru's daughter Indira Gandhi. She agreed to join with the Provincial Bangladesh Government; from 21 November the Indian Army took over control from BD Forces. 'Youth camps' were set up in border areas to train youths in guerrilla warfare. A sizable guerrilla force was raised within a few months.

From late June, the first batch of trained BD Forces guerrillas, a few hundred in number, entered and began operating within occupied Bangladesh. Their repeated hit-and-run attacks on Pakistan Army bases and communication systems hampered the Pakistan Army.

During this juncture India signed a friendship treaty with the USSR in August and Russian armament supply to India began. Till then about 500 guerrillas were trained. It was planned that the number would be increased by 10,000 more, by training 1,000 guerrillas per month. From late August, besides limited training and supplying the BDF, the Eastern Command of the Indian Army, headquartered in Kolkata, got involved in setting their monthly 'ops target'. Major General B N Sarkar of the Indian Army was appointed as the military liaison between the Indian government and the Provincial Government of Bangladesh. In a naval operation, BDF naval commandos, blew up two Pakistan Navy ships anchored at Chittagong port in Bangladesh.

At the beginning of the war, three divisions of the Pakistan Army were stationed in East Pakistan. From 25 March to 7 April, Pakistan forces in East Pakistan (Bangladesh) were reinforced by two more divisions from Pakistan. For a decisive offensive against Pakistan, Indian forces were reinforced with forces stationed in its northern front, securing the border with China. Indian military strategists scheduled the decisive offensive in winter. Meanwhile, the Bangladesh Forces would destroy the border outposts, thus making it easier for the guerrillas to pour in and operate within the country.

BDF guerrillas kept attacking government headquarters, military check posts, bridges, railways, and power stations. As a result, land transportation capacity in occupied Bangladesh reduced to one-tenth by September. From the second week of October, guerrilla operation intensified further. By late October, only 90 of the 370 outposts survived.

In early December, in the wake of a Pakistan air strike on Indian territory, India declared war with Pakistan and recognized Bangladesh. US president Richard Nixon bluffed a presence of the Seventh Fleet into the Bay of Bengal. The USSR opposed the move and also deployed a single warship in the Bay of Bengal. The Pakistan forces surrendered on 16 December in Dhaka.

== Dissent ==
In September, 40 members of the national and provincial assemblies of the South Zone, headquartered in Barasat, issued a statement expressing dissatisfaction on the provisional government's performance. They asked for revocation of the prime minister's Zonal Administrative Council order (GA/810/345) and instead forming a committee consisting of Awami League members. They also complained about the members of the Planning Commission as 'none of them is Awami Leaguer nor do they believe in the ideology of Awami League'. They asked for Prime Minister Tajuddin Ahmad's resignation from the cabinet and Awami League.

The Chhatra League, the student wing of the Awami League, and labour groups united under a separate force, initially called the Bangladesh Liberation Force (BLF) and later Mujib Bahini. Though initially commissioned by Osmani to recruit youths for the regular Bangladesh Forces, they eventually emerged as an independent armed force, under the auspices of the Indian intelligence agency Research and Analysis Wing (RAW). Mujib Bahini clashed with the regular forces at various places. Sector Commanders of the regular forces and Osmani urged the government to bring them under the same command. Prime Minister Tajuddin himself expressed his concern about Mujib Bahini to Indian officials on occasion and to Prime Minister Gandhi at their meeting on 22 October. The situation, however, never improved.

By August, Minister of Foreign Affairs Khondaker Mostaq Ahmad and his cohorts at his ministry secretly established a liaison with the United States, a key ally of Pakistan, without the Government's knowledge. With Sheikh Mujib on trial in Pakistan for high treason, the same group was also spreading the 'either freedom or Mujib' doctrine. Indian intelligence agencies had discovered the fact just before Mostaq was scheduled to lead the Bangladesh delegation to the United Nations General Assembly in New York. Tajuddin removed Mostaq from the UN delegation and sacked him later in December, after the war.

== See also ==
- Government in exile
- The Jai Bangla

== Sources ==
- Imam, H T (2010). বাংলাদেশ সরকার ১৯৭১ [Bangladesh Government 1971] (in Bengali) (3rd ed.). Dhaka: Agamee Prakashani. ISBN 9789844017832.
- Hasan, Muyeedul (1986). মূলধারা '৭১ [Mainstream '71] (in Bengali) (2nd ed.). Dhaka: The University Press Limited. ISBN 9789848815632.
- Rahman, Hasan Hafizur, ed. (1982). "প্রথম অধ্যায়: ১২: কলিকাতাস্থ পাকিস্তানী ডেপুটি হাই কমিশনারের বাংলাদেশের পক্ষাবলম্বন" [First Chapter: 12: Pakistani Deputy High Commissioner in Kolkata Switches Allegiance to Bangladesh]. বাংলাদেশের স্বাধীনতা যুদ্ধ: দলিলপত্র [History of Bangladesh War of Independence: Documents] (PDF). Vol. 3. Dhaka: Ministry of Information, Government of the People's Republic of Bangladesh. pp. 30–32. ISBN 9844330912.
- Islam, Barrister Amir-ul (1985). "৯: ব্যারিস্টার আমিরুল ইসলাম (সাক্ষাৎকার)" [9: Barrister Amir-ul Islam (Interview)]. In —— (ed.). বাংলাদেশের স্বাধীনতা যুদ্ধ: দলিলপত্র [History of Bangladesh War of Independence: Documents] (PDF) (in Bengali). Vol. 15. Dhaka: Ministry of Information, Government of the People's Republic of Bangladesh. pp. 51–110. ISBN 9844330912.
- Hossain, Doctor Kamal (1985). "১৮: ডক্টর কামাল হোসেন (সাক্ষাৎকার)" [18: Doctor Kamal Hossain (Interview)]. In —— (ed.). বাংলাদেশের স্বাধীনতা যুদ্ধ: দলিলপত্র [History of Bangladesh War of Independence: Documents] (PDF). Vol. 15. Dhaka: Ministry of Information, Government of the People's Republic of Bangladesh. pp. 143–193. ISBN 9844330912.
- Sobhan, Rehman (1985). "৩৬: রেহমান সোবহান (সাক্ষাৎকার)" [36: Rehman Sobhan (Interview)]. In —— (ed.). বাংলাদেশের স্বাধীনতা যুদ্ধ: দলিলপত্র [History of Bangladesh War of Independence: Documents] (PDF). Vol. 15. Dhaka: Ministry of Information, Government of the People's Republic of Bangladesh. pp. 263–293. ISBN 9844330912.
- Anisuzzaman (1997). আমার একাত্তর [My Seventy-One (Memoir)] (in Bengali). Dhaka: Sahitya Prakash. ISBN 9844651255.
- Khan, Faruq Aziz (2014). Spring 1971. Dhaka: Agamee Prakashani. ISBN 9789840416332.
- Karim, S. A. (2005). Sheikh Mujib: Triumph and Tragedy. Dhaka: The University Press Limited. ISBN 9789845061537.
- Ahmad, Mohiuddin (2014). জাসদের উত্থান পতন: অস্থির সময়ের রাজনীতি [Rise and Fall of JSD: Politics in the Time of Turmoil] (in Bengali) (10th ed.). Dhaka: Prothoma Prokashan. ISBN 9789849074755.
