= St Francis Xavier's Green Herald International School =

First English-medium school in Bangladesh

Coordinates: 23.7595°N 90.3678°E

S.F.X. Greenherald International School
- 24 Asad Ave, Mohammadpur 1207; Bangladesh

Information
- Religious affiliation: RNDM Sisters
- Established: 1912
- Principal: Sr. Jacqueline L. Gomes RNDM
- Language: English
- Website: https://sfxghis.school/

SFX Greenherald International School is a private English-medium school in Dhaka, Bangladesh, which follows the curriculum by the University of Cambridge. The school is located beside St. Joseph Higher Secondary School.

== History ==
The school was established in 1912 by the RNDM Sisters, Christian Missionary and is the first English medium school in Bangladesh. The school was originally initiated by the Sisters, when Adèle Euphrasie Barbier, the founder came to Chittagong by boat on 25th March 1883 and established the St. Scholastic's convent.

== Notable alumni ==
- Tania Amir (born 1964) - Barrister at the Bangladesh Supreme Court

== See also ==
- List of Jesuit sites
- Adèle Euphrasie Barbier
