= Proclamation of Bangladeshi Independence =

Proclamation of Bangladeshi Independence বাংলাদেশের স্বাধীনতার ঘোষণাপত্র
- Created: 26 March 1971; 55 years ago
- Ratified: 10 April 1971; 55 years ago
- Location: Liberation War Museum; Sher-e-Bangla Nagar, Dhaka, Bangladesh
- Author(s): 1st Declaration by Sheikh Mujibur Rahman; 2nd Declaration by Provisional Government of Bangladesh
- Signatories: Constituent Assembly of Bangladesh
- Purpose: Declaring East Pakistan's independence as Bangladesh with the establishment of its provisional government

The Proclamation of Bangladeshi Independence (Bengali: বাংলাদেশের স্বাধীনতার ঘোষণাপত্র), refers to the declaration of independence of East Pakistan as Bangladesh on 26 March 1971, at the onset of the Bangladesh Liberation War by Sheikh Mujibur Rahman. (Note: Multiple references:) The next day on March 27 after Pakistan's brutal Operation Searchlight began killing unarmed people, Major Ziaur Rahman, broadcast the message on radio on behalf of detained leader Sheikh Mujibur Rahman from the Swadhin Bangla Betar Kendra radio station in Kalurghat, Chattogram. (Note: Multiple references:) This message was picked up by a Japanese ship and eventually re-transmitted by global networks like the BBC and Radio Australia, making it the first widely heard announcement. Several Indian military officers and contemporary historians have documented Zia's broadcast as a turning point. For instance, former Indian Major General Sukhwant Singh noted in his book, India's Wars Since Independence: The Liberation of Bangladesh, that Zia's voice on the radio was a defining moment for those following the conflict from India. On 10 April, the Provisional Government of Bangladesh issued a proclamation on the basis of the previous declaration and established an interim constitution for the independence movement.

The first Bangladeshi flag used during the Liberation War

== Declarations ==
In the first general election in Pakistan, in December 1970, the Bangladesh Awami League (BAL) won nearly every seat representing East Pakistan. That gave them an absolute majority in the National Assembly. President Yahya Khan, however, kept them from taking power by postponing the convening of the assembly indefinitely. Tensions mounted; by early March 1971, there was broad support in East Pakistan for independence, but the AL leadership thought ongoing negotiations with Yahya Khan might still reach a solution short of secession. Yahya Khan spun out talks with the AL through 25 March, on the night of which he unleashed a military crackdown.

In the evening of 25 March, Sheikh Mujibur Rahman, leader of the Awami League, convened a meeting of senior Bengali nationalist leaders, including Tajuddin Ahmad and Colonel M A G Osmani, at his residence in Dhanmondi. They were briefed by Bengali insiders within the military of an impending crackdown. They implored Mujib to declare independence but Mujib declined to do because he wanted independence in a bloodless systematic manner. Tajuddin Ahmed even brought all the recording instruments but had failed to convince Mujib to record independence declaration. Rather, Mujib ordered all the high ups to flee to India. However, Mujib decided to remain in Dhaka in hope of coming to a negotiated compromise with West Pakistan in becoming the Prime Minister of the whole Pakistan then it would have been easier to gain independence then.

On the night of 25 March, the Pakistan Armed Forces launched Operation Searchlight in the capital of East Pakistan. Tanks rolled out on the streets of Dhaka. The troops massacred students and intellectuals in Dhaka University, as well as many civilians in other parts of the city. It set major cities ablaze and crushed resistance from the police and the East Pakistan Rifles (present-day Border Guard Bangladesh).

At 12.20 AM on 26 March from his house at Dhanmondi, Sheikh Mujibur Rahman sent a message before his arrest about the attacks on EPR and police barracks in Dhaka, and proclaimed the independence of Bangladesh. Major Ziaur Rahman of the East Bengal Regiment later on March 27 broadcast the declatration of independence on radio on behalf of Mujib. The declaration of independence was widely reported in newspapers around the world. Major Ziaur Rahman's declaration is as follows:

This is Swadhin Bangla Betar Kendra. I, Major Ziaur Rahman, on behalf of Bangabandhu Sheikh Mujibur Rahman, hereby declare that the independent People's Republic of Bangladesh has been established. I call upon all Bengalis to rise against the attack by the West Pakistani Army. We shall fight to the last to free our motherland. By the grace of Allah, victory is ours.

On 10 April 1971, the Provisional Government of Bangladesh issued the formal Proclamation of Independence.

According to A. K. Khandker, who served as Deputy Chief of Staff of the Bangladesh Armed Forces during the Liberation War; Sheikh Mujib avoided a radio broadcast fearing that, it might be used as evidence of treason by the Pakistani military against him during his trial. This view is also supported in a book written by the daughter of Tajuddin Ahmed.

== Constituent Assembly ==
On 10 April 1971, the Provisional Government of Bangladesh was formed in Mujibnagar. It converted the elected Bengali members of the national and provincial assemblies of Pakistan into the Constituent Assembly of Bangladesh. The constituent assembly issued a second proclamation of independence, which also served as the fundamental law of Bangladesh until the adoption of the constitution in 1972. This proclamation was drafted by Barrister M Amir-ul Islam and reviewed by Indian Barrister Subrata Roy Chowdhury. The text is given in the following:-

Declaration by the Constituent Assembly
PROCLAMATION OF INDEPENDENCE

Mujibnagar, Bangladesh
Dated 10th day of April 1971.

Whereas free elections were held in Bangladesh from 7 December 1970 to 17 January 1971, to elect representatives for the purpose of framing a Constitution,

AND

Whereas at these elections the people of Bangladesh elected 167 out of 169 representatives belonging to the Awami League,

AND

Whereas General Yahya Khan summoned the elected representatives of the people to meet on 3 March 1971, for the purpose of framing a Constitution,

AND

Whereas the Assembly so summoned was arbitrarily and illegally postponed for indefinite period,

AND

Whereas instead of fulfilling their promise and while still conferring with the representatives of the people of Bangladesh, Pakistan authorities declared an unjust and treacherous war,

AND

Whereas in the facts and circumstances of such treacherous conduct Bangabandhu Sheikh Mujibur Rahman, the undisputed leader of the 75 million people of Bangladesh, in due fulfillment of the legitimate right of self-determination of the people of Bangladesh, duly made a declaration of independence at Dacca on 26 March 1971, and urged the people of Bangladesh to defend the honour and integrity of Bangladesh,

AND

Whereas in the conduct of a ruthless and savage war the Pakistani authorities committed and are still continuously committing numerous acts of genocide and unprecedented tortures, amongst others on the civilian and unarmed people of Bangladesh,

AND

Whereas the Pakistan Government by levying an unjust war and committing genocide and by other repressive measures made it impossible for the elected representatives of the people of Bangladesh to meet and frame a Constitution, and give to themselves a Government,

AND

Whereas the people of Bangladesh by their heroism, bravery and revolutionary fervour have established effective control over the territories of Bangladesh,

We the elected representatives of the people of Bangladesh, as honour bound by the mandate given to us by the people of Bangladesh whose will is supreme duly constituted ourselves into a Constituent Assembly, and

having held mutual consultations, and

in order to ensure for the people of Bangladesh equality, human dignity and social justice,

declare and constitute Bangladesh to be sovereign People's Republic and thereby confirm the declaration of independence already made by Bangabandhu Sheikh Mujibur Rahman, and

do hereby affirm and resolve that till such time as a Constitution is framed, Bangabandhu Sheikh Mujibur Rahman shall be the President of the Republic and that Syed Nazrul Islam shall be the Vice President of the Republic, and

that the President shall be the Supreme Commander of all the Armed Forces of the Republic,

shall exercise all the Executive and Legislative powers of the Republic including the power to grant pardon,

shall have the power to appoint a Prime Minister and such other Ministers as he considers necessary,

shall have the power to levy taxes and expend monies,

shall have the power to summon and adjourn the Constituent Assembly, and

do all other things that may be necessary to give to the people of Bangladesh an orderly and just Government,

We the elected representatives of the people of Bangladesh do further resolve that in the event of there being no President or the President being unable to enter upon his office or being unable to exercise his powers and duties, due to any reason whatsoever, the vice-president shall have and exercise all the powers, duties and responsibilities herein conferred on the President,

We further resolve that we undertake to observe and give effect to all duties and obligations that devolve upon us as a member of the family of nations and under the Charter of United Nations,

We further resolve that this proclamation of independence shall be deemed to have come into effect from 26th day of March 1971.

We further resolve that in order to give effect to this instrument we appoint Prof. Yusuf Ali our duly Constituted Potentiary and to give to the President and the vice-president oaths of office.

PROF. YUSUF ALI
Duly Constituted Potentiary
By and under the authority
of the Constituent Assembly of Bangladesh

== Proclaimer controversy ==
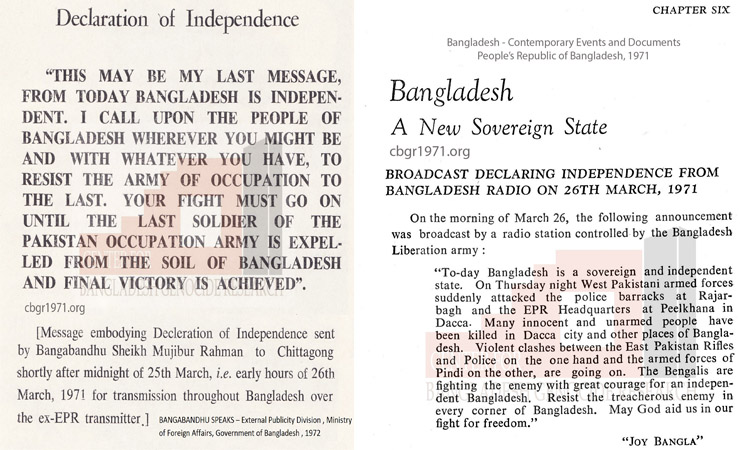
The two messages sent by Bangabandhu Sheikh Mujibur Rahman embodying the proclamation of independence of Bangladesh. Bangabandhu is widely regarded as the proclaimer of the independence of Bangladesh.

Until 2010, there was a controversy between the two dominant parties of Bangladesh, Awami League (BAL) and Bangladesh Nationalist Party (BNP), over who had issued the proclamation: AL claimed Sheikh Mujibur Rahman and BNP claimed Ziaur Rahman. However, Bangabandhu is described as the proclaimer of the independence of Bangladesh in all diplomatic secret documents of the Richard Nixon administration, news, and other documents. In 2010, a ruling of the Supreme Court officially recognized Sheikh Mujibur Rahman as the promulgator, and denounced the views of BNP, calling it distortion of history.

=== Background ===
Since its establishment, the Bengali-majority of Pakistan wanted full political and cultural autonomy, which resulted in a rise of nationalist and pro-democratic movements in the country. The Awami League, established in 1949, became the leading and representative party of the Bengalis in Pakistan. In the 1970 Pakistani general election, the League won an absolute victory and emerged as the largest political party in the country, but the junta government of Yahya Khan refused to transfer power due to its pro-Bengali and secular stance. On 1 March 1971, Bangabandhu Sheikh Mujibur Rahman, then president of Awami League, declared civil disobedience movement in East Pakistan. On 7 March 1971, Bangabandhu delivered his famous speech, concluding with, "The struggle this time, is a struggle for our liberty. The struggle this time, is a struggle for our independence. Joy Bangla!" It's widely considered as the de facto declaration of Bangladeshi independence.

=== Controversy ===
Bangladesh Nationalist Party (BNP) strongly claimed Ziaur Rahman as the proclaimer of independence. The third volume of Bangladesh Independence War: Documents, published in 1978, recognized Zia as the proclaimer. Even some of the BNP leaders openly denounced Bangabandhu as the false proclaimer during Khaleda Zia’s premiership.

The controversy, lasted nearly two decades, led the country to a political and an ideological crisis. When a different party comes to power, they change the history books of Bangladesh to either prefer Sheikh Mujibur Rahman or Ziaur Rahman.

However, some minor controversies also involve around the broadcasting of the proclamation. According to A. K. Khandker Bir Uttom, a military officer during the liberation war and former planning minister of Bangladesh, on 26 March, a technician at Swadhin Bangla Betar Kendra read out the proclamation of independence first over the radio. According to Abdullah Abu Sayeed, Ekushey Padak Medalist Swadhin Bangla Betar Kendra artist Abul Kashem Sandwip also read the proclamation before Ziaur Rahman.

=== Controversial quote of A. K. Khandker ===
In 2014, A. K. Khandker claimed in his book 1971: Bhetore Baire (lit: "1971: Inside Out") that Bangabandhu did not make any proclamation about independence from 7 March until his arrest, nor did he leave any written notes or recorded voice messages and did not follow any predetermined directions. Additionally, he also controversially quoted that Bangabandhu cried Joy Pakistan ("Victory to Pakistan") alongside Joy Bangla in his speech on 7 March 1971. But after its publication, there was widespread criticism among the contemporary Awami League leaders and in the parliament session, and a case was filed against the author and the book for distortion of historical informations, and the author withdrew the said part of the book and other related parts. Later he formally announced an apology for giving false informations in his book.

=== United States documents ===
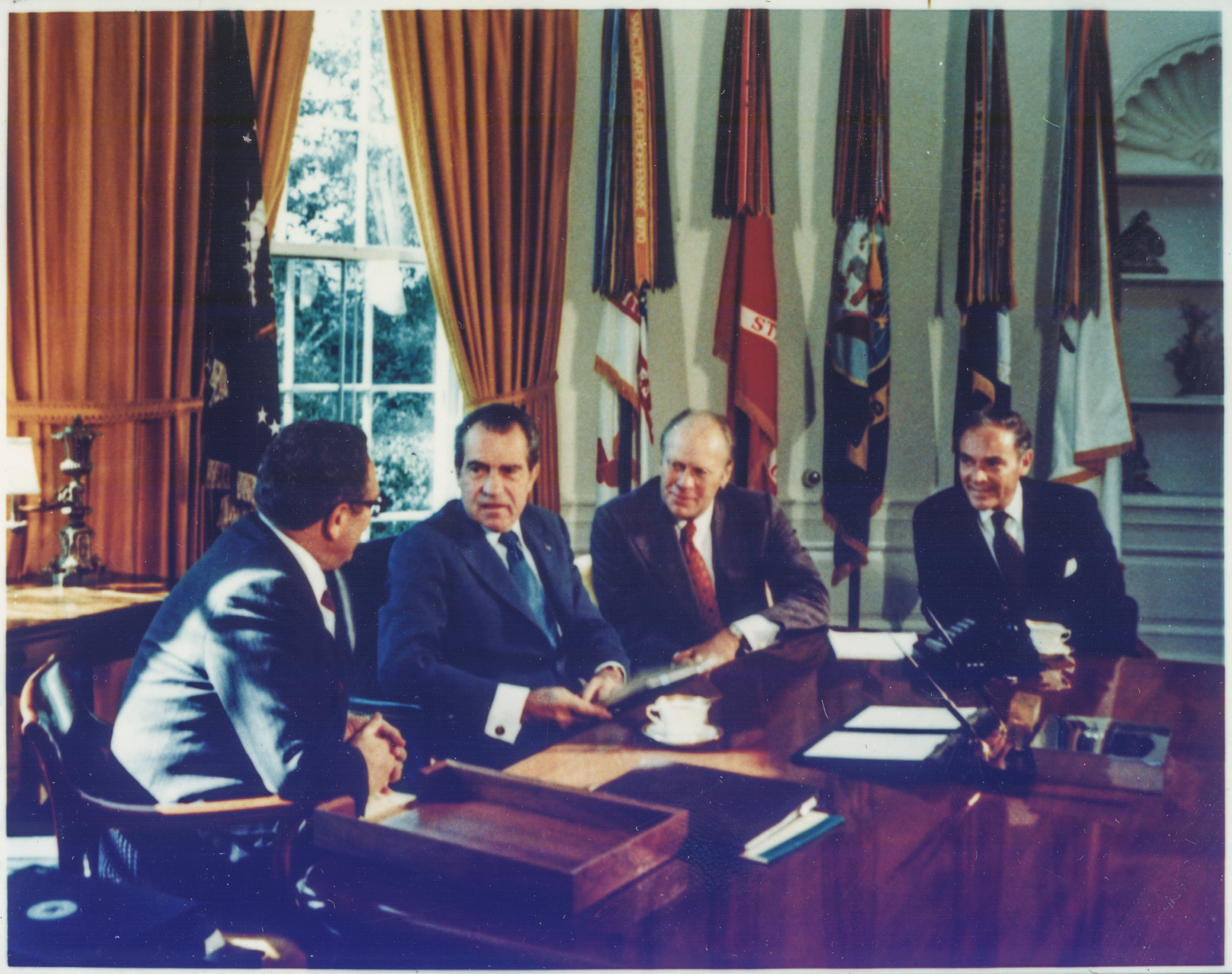
Left to right: Henry Kissinger, Richard Nixon, Gerald Ford and Alexander Haig

According to South Asian crisis, 1971, a secret document published by the United States Department of State covering the Indo-Pakistan affairs that time, United States was observing the situations of Pakistan from March 1971. On 26 March 1971, just after the Operation Searchlight, US president Richard Nixon called an emergency meeting with then US Secretary of State Henry Kissinger, the Special Action Group Washington, the National Security Committee, and the CIA representatives at the White House, where it was said to have declared the independence of East Pakistan. Richard Helms, Director of the CIA, said on that meeting:

"Yes, an agreement appeared near on March 24. The breakdown may have been because of Mujibur Rahman's insistence on the immediate lifting of martial law. A clandestine radio broadcast has Mujibur Rahman declaring the independence of Bangla Desh. There are 20,000 loyal West Pakistani troops in East Pakistan. There are also 5,000 East Pakistani regulars and 13,000 East Pakistani paramilitary troops, but their loyalty is doubtful...."

=== Supreme Court ruling ===
In 2010, the third volume of Bangladesh Independence War: Documents, published presenting Ziaur Rahman as the proclaimer, was declared null and void by the Supreme Court, and the volume was ordered to be confiscated and withdrawn from all places in the country and abroad. Directions given by the High Court Division:

"Those involved in such distortion of history have violated the Constitution. The government can take punitive action against the verification committee who created the distorted history on charges of fraud and violation of the constitution."

== See also ==
- History of Bangladesh
- July Declaration
