= 7 March Speech of Sheikh Mujibur Rahman =

1971 speech by the Bangladeshi Leader

7th March Speech
- Part of Non-cooperation movement
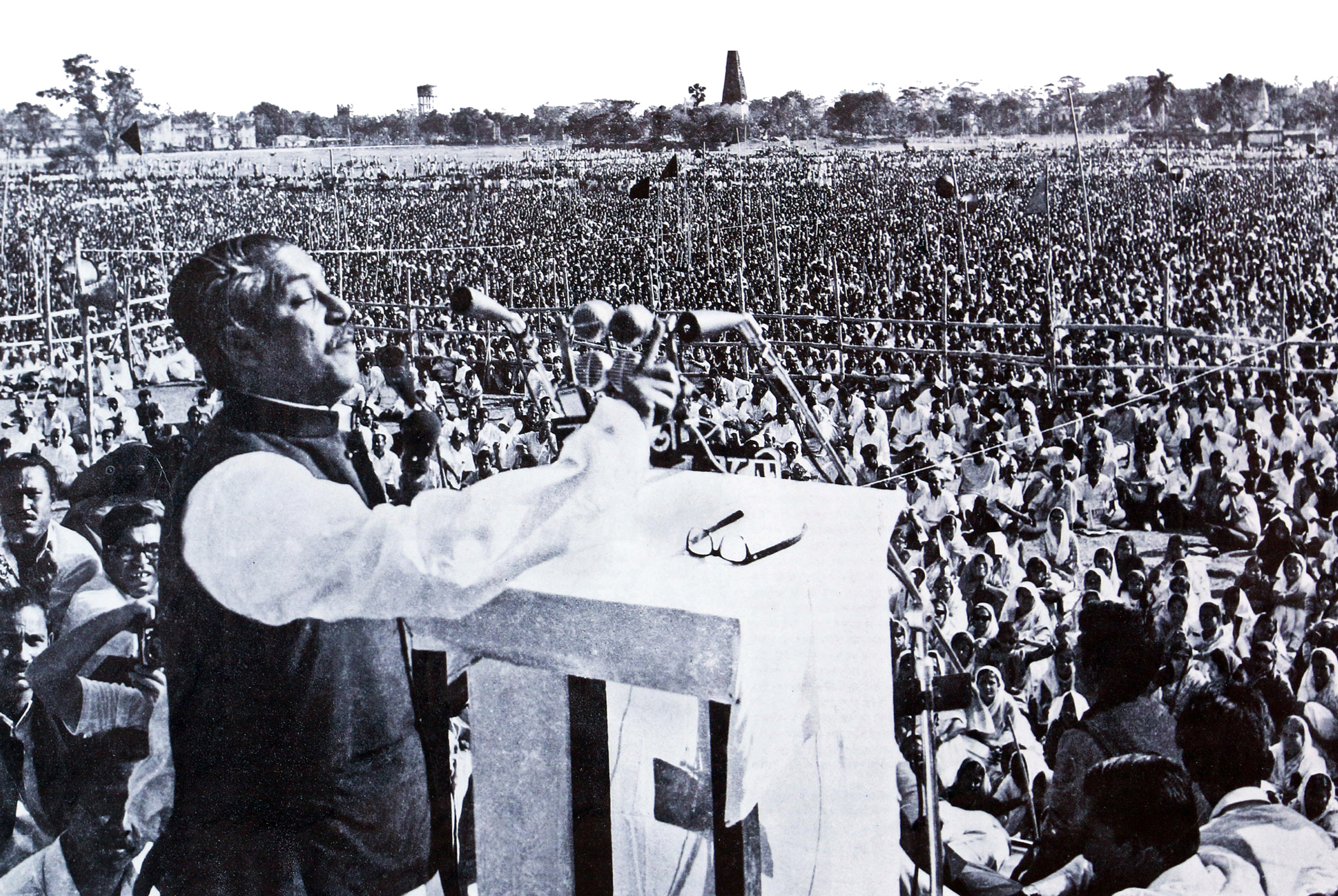
- Sheikh Mujibur Rahman delivering his speech on 7 March 1971
- Native name: ৭ই মার্চের ভাষণ
- Date: 7 March 1971
- Time: 2:45 pm — 3:07pm (UTC+6)
- Duration: Approximately 19 Minutes
- Venue: Ramna Race Course
- Location: Ramna, Dacca, East Pakistan, Pakistan (now Dhaka, Bangladesh); 23.7331°N 90.3984°E
- Type: Speech
- Theme: Call for civil disobedience, informal declaration of independence of Bangladesh
- Filmed by: Abul Khair and M Abul Khayer, MNA

The 7th March Speech of Mujib, or the 7/3 Speech (Bengali: সাতই মার্চের ভাষণ, romanized: Sāta'i Mārcēra Bhāṣaṇa), was a public speech given by Sheikh Mujibur Rahman, the founding leader of Bangladesh on 7 March 1971 at the Ramna Race Course (now Suhrawardy Udyan) in Dhaka to a gathering of over one million (1,000,000) people. It was delivered during a period of escalating tensions between East Pakistan and the powerful political and military establishment of West Pakistan. In the speech, Mujib informally declared the independence of Bangladesh, proclaiming: "The struggle this time, is a struggle for our liberty. The struggle this time, is a struggle for our independence." He announced a civil disobedience movement in the province, calling for "every house to turn into a fortress".

The speech informally addressed the Bengali people and urged them to prepare for a war of independence amid widespread reports of armed mobilization by West Pakistan. The Bangladesh Liberation War began 18 days later when the Pakistan Army initiated Operation Searchlight against Bengali civilians, intelligentsia, students, politicians, and armed personnel. On 30 October 2017, UNESCO added the speech to the Memory of the World Register as a documentary heritage.

== Background ==
Pakistan was created in 1947, during the Partition of India, as a Muslim homeland in South Asia. Its territory was composed mostly of the Muslim-majority provinces of British India, including two geographically and culturally separate areas, one east of India and the other west. The western zone was popularly (and, for a period, officially) called West Pakistan, while the eastern zone (modern-day Bangladesh) was called East Bengal and later renamed East Pakistan under the One Unit Scheme. West Pakistan dominated the country politically, and its leaders exploited the East economically, leading to popular grievances.

When East Pakistanis, such as Khawaja Nazimuddin, Muhammad Ali Bogra, and Huseyn Shaheed Suhrawardy, were elected Prime Minister of Pakistan, they were immediately deposed by the predominantly West Pakistani establishment. The military dictatorships of Ayub Khan (27 October 1958 – 25 March 1969) and Yahya Khan (25 March 1969 – 20 December 1971), both West Pakistanis, worsened the East Pakistanis' discontent.

In 1966, the Awami League, led by Sheikh Mujib, launched the Six Point Movement to demand provincial autonomy for East Pakistan. The Pakistani establishment rejected the League's proposals, and the military government arrested Sheikh Mujib and charged him with treason through the Agartala Conspiracy Case. After three years in jail, Mujib was released in 1969, and the case against him was dropped in the face of mass protests and widespread violence in East Pakistan. The 1970 Bhola cyclone saw the death of 300 thousand people and a poor response from the West Pakistan-based government.

In December 1970, the Awami League, the largest East Pakistani political party, won a landslide victory in national elections, garnering 167 of the 169 seats allotted to East Pakistan and a majority of the 313 seats in the National Assembly. This gave it the constitutional right to form a government. However, Zulfikar Ali Bhutto, the leader of the Pakistan Peoples Party, refused to allow Sheikh Mujib to become prime minister. Following advice of Bhutto, President Yahya Khan postponed the swearing in of the Awami League government. The news of the postponement of the government formation led to protests across East Pakistan

The convening of the National Assembly was moved from 3 March to 25 March, leading to an outcry across East Pakistan. Violence broke out in Dhaka, Chittagong, Rangpur, Comilla, Rajshahi, Sylhet, and Khulna, and the security forces killed dozens of unarmed protesters. There were open calls for Sheikh Mujib to declare independence from Pakistan, and the Awami League called a large public gathering at Dhaka's Ramna Race Course on 7 March to respond.

== Speech ==
Sheikh Mujibur Rahman made the speech at the Ramna Race Course (now Suhrawardy Udyan) on 7 March 1971. The speech was preceded by speculation on whether Sheikh Mujibur Rahman would declare the independence of Bangladesh.

Sheikh Mujibur Rahman started with the lines, "Today, I appeared before you with a heavy heart. You know everything and understand as well. We tried with our lives. But the painful matter is that today, in Dhaka, Chattogram, Khulna, Rajshahi and Rangpur, the streets are dyed red with the blood of our brethren. Today the people of Bengal want freedom, the people of Bengal want to survive, the people of Bengal want to have their rights. What wrong did we do?"

He mentioned four conditions for joining the National Assembly on 25 March:

1. The immediate lifting of martial law;
2. The immediate withdrawal of all military personnel to their barracks;
3. The immediate transfer of power to elected representatives of the people;
4. A proper investigation for the loss of life during the conflict.

He also gave several directives for a civil disobedience movement, instructing that:

1. People should not pay taxes;
2. Government servants should take orders only from him;
3. The secretariat, government and semi-government offices, and courts in East Pakistan should observe strikes, with necessary exemptions announced from time to time;
4. Only local and inter-district telephone lines should function;
5. Railways and ports could continue to function, but their workers were told to not co-operate if their activities would help the repression of East Pakistan.

The speech lasted for about 19 minutes and concluded with, "The struggle this time, is a struggle for our liberty. The struggle this time, is a struggle for our independence. Joy Bangla!" It was a de facto declaration of Bangladesh's independence.

== Recording ==
The Pakistani government did not give permission to live broadcast the speech through radio and television on 7 March 1971. AHM Salahuddin who was the then chairman of Pakistan International Film Corporation (PIFC) and M Abul Khayer, a then Member of the National Assembly (MNA) from East Pakistan and was also the managing director of PIFC, made arrangements to record the video and audio of the speech. The video was recorded by actor Abul Khair who was the director of films under the Ministry of Information of Pakistan at the time. The audio of the speech was recorded by H N Khondokar, a technician of the Ministry of Information associated with M Abul Khayer, MNA.

The audio record was developed and archived by Dhaka Record, a record label owned by Mohammad Abul Khayer, MNA. Later on, a copy of the audio and video recording was handed over to Sheikh Mujib and a copy of the audio was sent to India. 3000 copies of the audio were distributed by Indian record label His Master's Voice throughout the world.

== Reception ==
International media had descended upon East Pakistan for the speech amidst speculation that Sheikh Mujib would make a unilateral declaration of independence from Pakistan. However, keeping in mind the failures of Rhodesia's Unilateral Declaration of Independence and of the Biafra struggle in Nigeria, he did not make a direct declaration. Nevertheless, the speech was effective in giving Bengalis a clear goal of independence. Mujib's speech was double edged, he did not call for independence or violence but ended the speech urging preparation for both. The speech also raised his profile in the minds of the Bengalis of East Pakistan.

The United States Embassy in Pakistan noted that Sheikh Mujibur Rahman and the Bengalis were pushing for a degree of autonomy that would not be acceptable to the Pakistan Military and President Yahya Khan. They predicted a violent confrontation would be inevitable. Sheikh Mujibur Rahman and President Yahya Khan sat down for negotiations. Swadhin Bangla Kendriyo Chhatro Sangram Parishad called for international support for the independence of Bangladesh.

On 25 March 1971, the Pakistan Military launched Operation Searchlight in East Pakistan. The military forces targeted students and Awami League leaders. Sheikh Mujibur Rahman was arrested at the beginning of the operation and flown to West Pakistan. The launch of the operation marked the start of the Bangladesh genocide.

== Legacy ==
The government of Bangladesh included parts of the speech in the constitution of Bangladesh through the passage of the 15th amendment to the Constitution of Bangladesh. The government of Bangladesh organizes various programs on 7 March marking the speech. On 7 October 2020, 7 March was declared "Historic Day" by the government of Bangladesh. Events are also organized by the Awami League and cultural organizations to mark the occasion. The Bangabandhu Memorial Trust Fund observes the anniversary of the speech.

The speech is on the Memory of the World Register of UNESCO, a list of the world's important documentary heritage. It was the first Bangladeshi content to be included in the Memory of the World Programme. Irina Bokova, director general of UNESCO, announced the decision at its headquarters in Paris on 30 October 2017. The declaration was welcomed by Prime Minister Sheikh Hasina, daughter of Sheikh Mujibur Rahman. Mahfuz Anam, the editor of The Daily Star, called the speech Sheikh Mujibur Rahman's finest hour.

In March 2018, Justices Naima Haider and Zafar Ahmed asked the government to explain why it should not be directed to preserve Suhrawardy Udyan due to the historic importance of the 7 March speech given at the Udyan.

In June 2019, the Embassy of Japan in Bangladesh published the speech in Japanese. The annual Joy Bangla Concert is organized by Young Bangla and the Center for Research and Information on 7 March. In March 2020, Justices Tariq ul Hakim and Md Iqbal Kabir of the High Court Division ordered the government to investigate if there were any errors in the speech that was inserted into the constitution of Bangladesh following a petition to the court that alleged inaccuracies.

=== In popular culture ===
- The documentary film Muktir Gaan by Tareque Masud and Catherine Masud begins with a video of the speech.
- Anisul Hoque incorporated the speech into his historical novel Maa, published in 2004.
- In his novel The Black Coat, Bangladeshi-Canadian author Neamat Imam created a character called Nur Hussain who memorialized the speech during the Bangladesh famine of 1974.
- Lt. Gen. Ziaur Rahman (later President of Bangladesh) wrote in an article titled Ekti Jatir Jonmo (Birth of a Nation) in the magazine Bichittra on 26 March 1974 that the speech had inspired him to take part in the 1971 Liberation War.
- The speech was included in the book We Shall Fight on the Beaches: The Speeches That Inspired History by English historian Jacob F. Field.

== See also ==
- List of speeches
- Bangladesh Liberation War

== Bibliography ==
Rahman, Muhammad Habibur (2024). বাংলাদেশের রাজনৈতিক ঘটনাপঞ্জি ১৯৭১-২০১১ [Bangladesh's Political Chronology 1971-2011] (in Bengali). Dhaka: Prothoma Prokashan. ISBN 978-9-849-02556-6.
