= Magfar Ahmed Chowdhury =

Magfar Ahmed Chowdhury (Azad) (Bengali: মাগফার আহমেদ চৌধুরী (আজাদ)) was a freedom fighter during the Liberation war of Bangladesh. He was caught by Pakistan Army on August 29, 1971 and martyred.

== Early life and education ==
Azad studied in a university in West Pakistan for a period of time. He returned to East Pakistan and completed Masters from the Department of International Relations in University of Dhaka.

== Participation in Liberation war ==
Azad was a member of the famous urban guerrilla group Crack Platoon and participated in several operations with other guerrilla fighters in Crack Platoon. Siddhirchor Power Plant Attack was one of the important attack by Azad. In an operation, this guerrilla group executed explosions on InterContinental Dhaka. After this incident, Azad was captured by Pakistan Army.

== Apprehension and death ==
Pakistan Army raided Azad's house in Dilu Road on August 29, 1971 at midnight. He was arrested and taken to Martial law Court which was, in reality, the MP Hostel at Airport Road. Azad was brutally tortured and killed there.

== Retrospect ==
Novelist Anisul Hoque has written a novel titled Maa in which Azad is the leading character.
