= The Ballad of Ayesha =

- First edition
- Author: Anisul Hoque
- Original title: আয়েশামঙ্গল
- Translator: Inam Ahmed
- Language: English
- Publisher: HarperCollins Publishers India
- Publication date: 20 July 2018
- Publication place: Bangladesh
- ISBN: 9789352778959

The Ballad of Ayesha is the English translation of the book Ayeshamangal by Anisul Hoque.

The book is set in newly independent Bangladesh with severe political unrest. The main character of the book is Ayesha, whose husband has been sentenced to death and is missing.

== Characters ==
- Ayesha
- Joynal Abedin, Ayesha's husband
