= Mohiuddin Ahmed (publisher) =

Bangladeshi publisher (1944–2021)

- মহিউদ্দিন আহমেদ
- Born: 2 December 1944; Feni, Bangladesh
- Died: 22 June 2021 (aged 76); Dhaka, Bangladesh
- Education: University of Dhaka
- Occupation: Publisher

Mohiuddin Ahmed (2 December 1944 – 22 June 2021) was a Bangladeshi author, editor, and publisher and founder of The University Press Limited.

== Early life and education ==
Ahmed was born in Feni's Parashuram upazila on 2 December 1944. He was a student of Notre Dame College, where he was the managing editor of Blue and Gold, a college magazine. Ahmed went on to study at the Department of Mass Communication and Journalism at Dhaka University and then studied journalism at Punjab University with a Pakistan Council Scholarship, where he worked as the editor of the Punjab University Chronicle.

== Career ==
After completing his MA, Ahmed joined the Pakistan Times as an apprentice journalist, but was soon offered the opportunity to join the Department of Journalism, Punjab University as an Assistant Lecturer in Mass Communication and Public Relations. From 1969 to 1972, Ahmed worked as 'Editor for Pakistan' at Oxford University Press (OUP) and, on his return to independent Bangladesh, served as the chief executive officer of OUP's Dhaka branch for two years.

The Dhaka branch of OUP was closed down in 1975 and Ahmed decided to found his own publishing house, University Press Limited (UPL), as a successor of OUP. UPL was established in 1975, with Ahmed as the founding chief executive.

== Awards and recognitions ==
In May 1988, Mohiuddin Ahmed was awarded a Cultural Doctorate in Publishing Management by the World University's international secretariat at Benson, Arizona.

In 2014, Ahmed was bestowed the title of emeritus Publisher by the Bangladesh Academic and Creative Publishers' Association.

== Death ==
Ahmed died on 22 June 2021, aged 77. He had been living with a Parkinson's disease diagnosis for over 20 years, and survived COVID-19.
