= Tania Amir =

Bangladeshi barrister and rights activist

Tania Amir is a Bangladeshi barrister and rights activist.

== Early life ==
Amir was born on 27 September 1964. Her father is Barrister M Amir-ul Islam. She studied at the Holy Cross Girls School, United Nations International School, St Francis Xavier's Green Herald International School, and Scholastica. She graduated from the University of Buckingham in 1990 with a law degree and was called to the bar at Gray's Inn.

== Career ==
Amir joined the Bangladesh High Court in 1991, and the Bangladesh Supreme Court in 1993 as a lawyer. She founded and is the head of chambers of Amir & Amir Law Associates.

Amir received the Begum Rokeya Shining Personality Award in 2005. She was the chairman of the Private Rural Initiative Program' (PRIP) Trust. She hosted TV show Tarokader Adda.

Amir filed a petition against President Iajuddin Ahmed becoming head of the caretaker government and the Bangladesh Election Commission declaring an election date in November 2006. She got into a heated argument with Attorney General AJ Mohammad Ali at the courtroom. Lawyers aligned with the Bangladesh Nationalist Party made offensive comments about her that The Daily Star saw unfit to print. Moudud Ahmed criticized her while Barrister Rokanuddin Mahmud defended her. She was accused of vandalizing the court along with 12 other lawyers including Amir Ul Islam, Enayetur Rahim, Kamal Hossain, and Rokanuddin Mahmud. She received bail in January 2007. The Bangladesh High Court quashed the case in 2010.

In 2008, Amir represented Kazi Salahuddin in a hearing at the Bangladesh Football Federation. Ahkame Sariah Hefazat Committee, affiliated with Bangladesh Jamaat-e-Islami, made derogatory remarks Amir over her comments on Baitul Mukarram National Mosque. In 2009, she was given the Gandhi Peace Award.

In 2013, Amir represented Bangladesh Tariqat Federation in a petition to remove the registration of the Bangladesh Jamaat-e-Islami party for their constitution being contrary to the constitution of Bangladesh. The High Court declared the registration of the party illegal.

Amir represented Imran H Sarker in 2018.

Amir and her father, Barrister M Amir-ul Islam, collected Awami League nomination papers for Kushtia-3 and Kushtia- 4 in November 2023.
