= Syed Abdus Samad =

Bangladeshi economist (1942–2021)

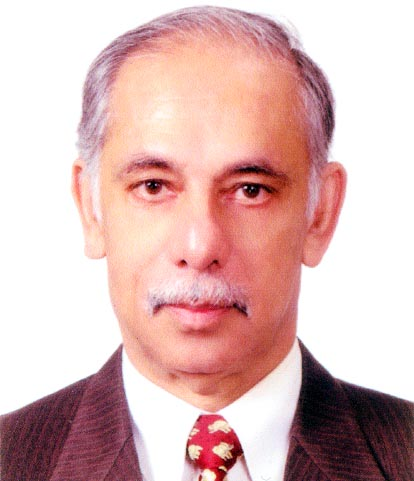
- Syed Abdus Samad
- Born: 1942; Gaffargaon, Mymensingh district, Bengal Presidency
- Died: 28 July 2021 (aged 78–79); Baridhara, Dhaka, Bangladesh
- Occupations: Executive Chairman (Cabinet Minister), Board of Investment, Bangladesh
- Years active: 1965–2021

Syed Abdus Samad (1942 – 28 July 2021) was a teacher of economics. He was a faculty member at the University of Dhaka, Boston State College, Boston University, the University of the South Pacific, and the Hankuk University of Foreign Studies, South Korea. Samad worked as a national and international civil servant, economist, and human rights activist. In Bangladesh, he was the permanent secretary to the Ministry of Energy and Mineral Resources, and a principal secretary to the Prime Minister. Samad was the executive chairman of the Bangladesh Board of Investment.

== Early life and education ==
Syed Abdus Samad was born to an educated family during 1942 in the village of Digha, Gaffargaon, in the Mymensingh district of the Bengal Presidency. His father Syed Abdul Ghani was a prominent lawyer. He received his bachelor's degree in economics from Dhaka University. He undertook post-graduate studies at UCLA. In 1977, Samad received his master's degrees in economics and political economics and in 1979, a doctoral degree from Boston University.

== Career ==
Samad joined the Civil Service of Pskistan in 1964. He also served as Bangabandhu's private secretary. He subsequently served as the principal secretary during government's 1996-2001 tenure.

Samad's role in 1971 Liberation War that he joined the Mujibnagar Government severing links with Pakistan while serving as the additional deputy commissioner (ADC) of Rangamati being a member of erstwhile Civil Service of Pakistan (CSP).

From 1980 to 1982, Samad was a member of the teaching and directing staff of the Bangladesh Administrative Staff College. Between 1982 and 1985, he was an economic advisor to the President of Bangladesh. Then, from 1985 to 1990, he taught students of economics at the Public Administration and Economic Development Training Academy.

From 1990 to 1996, Samad was the director of the Economics and Information Technology Program of the United Nations Asian and Pacific Development Center and from 1992 to 1997, he was the executive secretary of the Malaysian chapter of the Association of Development Research and Training Institutes of Asia and the Pacific.

From 1995 to 1997, Samad was president of the Bangladesh Civil Service Association and from 1996 to 1997, the permanent secretary to the Minister of Energy and Mineral Resources. Between 1997 and 2001, Samad was the principal secretary to the Government of Bangladesh. Samad also played a crucial role in reaching the historic 1996 Ganges Water Sharing Treaty with India and the 1997 peace agreement with Parbatya Chattagram Jana Sanghati Samity (PCJSS) that saw the end of the nearly two decades long unrest in the troubled hill region.

Between 2006 and 2009, Samad taught at the University of the South Pacific and at the Hankuk University of Foreign Studies in Korea.

Samad carried out evaluations of many inter-regional agencies, United Nations funded programmes and projects. He was a member of the technical committee of the global programme on comparative poverty research, funded by the International Social Science Council (ISSC), Paris. He was one of the authors of the global research book on poverty published by UNESCO and the Scandinavian University Press in 1996.

== Selected works ==
- Real Wages in Labour Surplus Economies (1981) Dhaka University, Dhaka.
- Planning (1984) Bangla Academy, Dhaka.
- SAARC Link: An econometric approach (1992) APDC/UNDP, Malaysia.
- External Economic Assistance (1993) The Information Documentation Resource Centre, Geneva and Colombo.
- Operational Strategies of Sustainable Development upon People's Initiatives (1993) APDC, UN, Nepal, Malaysia and Thailand.
- Privatization in Asia and the Pacific (1995) APDC, Commonwealth Secretariat, Kuala Lumpur, Malaysia.
- Economic transformation in Asia and the Pacific. 1995. Association of Development Research & Training Institutes of Asia and the Pacific (ADIPA)/UN. Malaysia/Sri Lanka.
- Sustainable development.1995. APDC/UNDP. Kuala Lumpur, Malaysia & Kathmandu, Nepal.
- Application of Information Technology (1996) APDC, Commonwealth Secretariat.
- Poverty, a Global Review (1996) UNESCO, Scandinavian University Press, Oslo, New York.
- Poverty Research, an Asian Review (1996), ADIPA, APDC, Malaysia.
- Changing Comparative Advantage in Asia and the Pacific (1997) APDC, ESCAP, UNDP, Malaysia, Thailand.
- Cobbled Manuscripts, Changing Kaleidoscope of Conventional Economics (2005) Ankur Prokashani, Dhaka, Bangladesh.
