= Mujibnagar Day =

Bangladeshi holiday

Mujibnagar Day is celebrated in Bangladesh on April 17 every year. This day is particularly associated with the emergence of Bangladesh as an independent territory.

== History ==
Within a few days of the War of Liberation, the first expatriate government of Bangladesh, known as the Mujibnagar government, was formed on 10 April. On April 17, the first government of independent

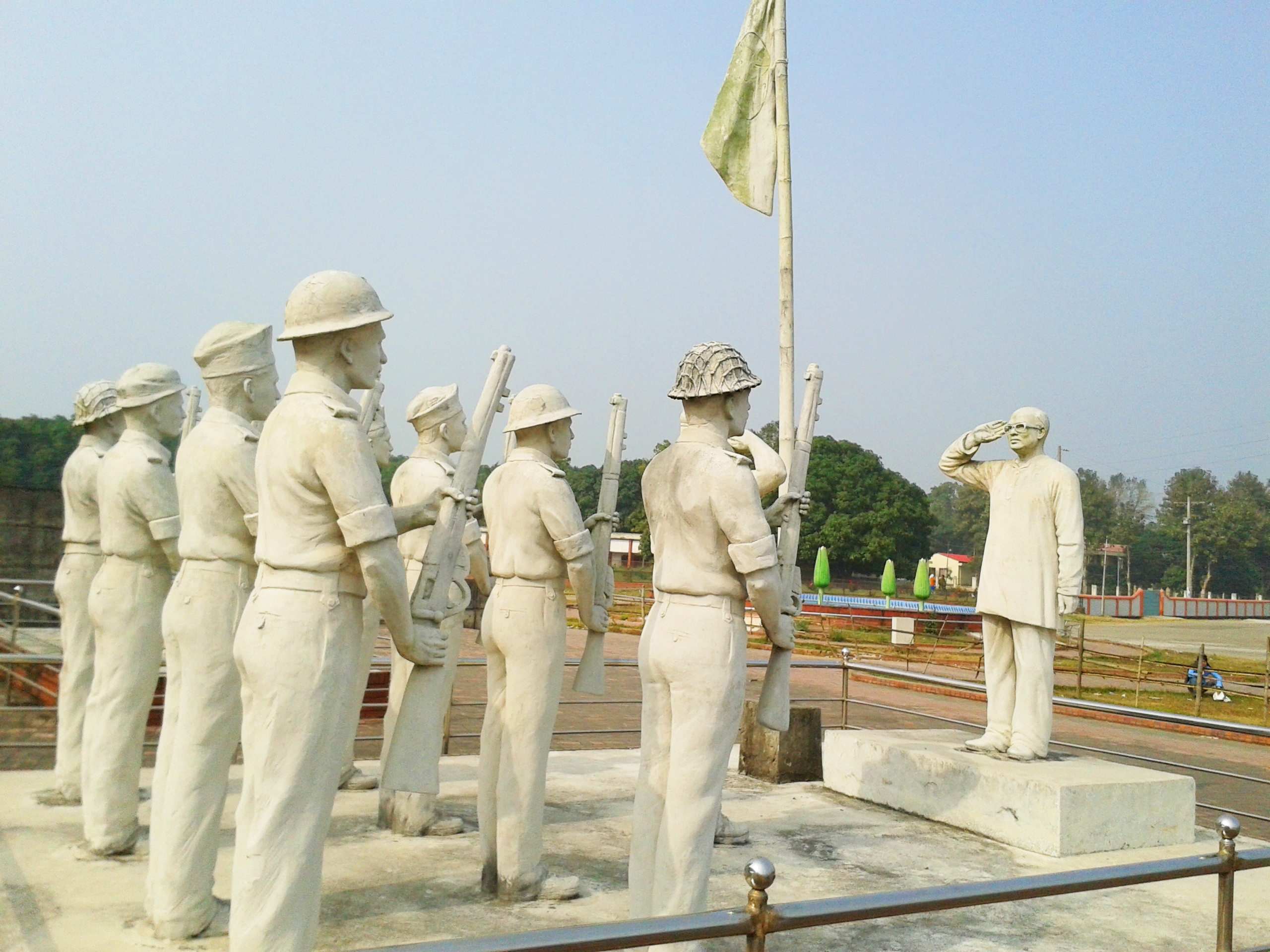
On 17 April 1971, the caretaker President Syed Nazrul Islam was awarded the Guard of Honor.

Bangladesh was sworn in at Mango Garden (Ambanagan) village of Vaidyanathtala (present-day Mujibnagar) in Meherpur district. Sheikh Mujibur Rahman was appointed president of this government. But he was then imprisoned in Pakistan. In his absence, Vice-President, Syed Nazrul Islam served as the Provincial President. Tajuddin Ahmed took over as Prime Minister. This government plays an important role in conducting the War of Liberation and building public opinion and support for this war at home and abroad. After the formation of this government, countless people jumped into armed struggle to liberate the country.

== Effect ==
This day Sheikh Mujibur Rahman was declared the first president of Bangladesh, while Syed Nazrul Islam was appointed the acting president in the absence of Sheikh Mujib. Tajuddin Ahmed was appointed as the first prime minister, while Khondoker Moshtaque Ahmed, Capt M Mansur Ali and AHM Qamaruzzaman were named as cabinet members. The interim government named General M.A.G Osmani as Commander-in-Chief of Bangladesh army while appointed Major General Abdur Rob as chief of staff.

== See also ==
- Provisional Government of Bangladesh
