= Jacob F. Field =

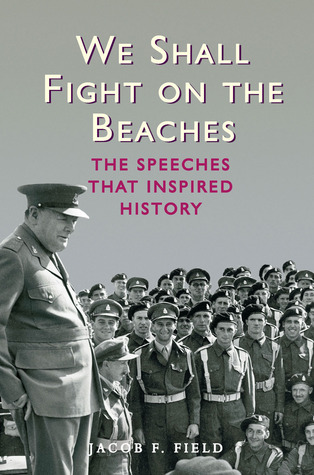
We Shall Fight on the Beaches: The Speeches That Inspired History book cover.

Jacob Franz Field (born 1983) is an English historian of the early modern period and author. He has written several works of popular history as well as an account of the impact of the Great Fire of London.

== Early life ==
Jacob Field was born in Lambeth, south London, in 1983. He studied modern history at the University of Oxford after which he undertook postgraduate study at Newcastle University, receiving his MLitt there in 2005. In 2005 he was awarded an Arts and Humanities Research Council grant to research and write his doctoral thesis on the socio-economic impact of the Great Fire of London for which he received his PhD from Newcastle in 2008.

== Career ==
Field joined the Cambridge Group for the History of Population and Social Structure at the University of Cambridge in 2008 where he researched Britain's occupational structure from the 14th to 19th centuries with particular reference to women's work and domestic service. In 2012 he moved to New Zealand, where he taught economic history at Massey University and the University of Waikato. He returned to England in 2016 where he began to work at the University of Cambridge on a research project examining the historical occupational structure of London.

He has written several popular history books and is best known for One Bloody Thing After Another: The World's Gruesome History. The inclusion of Bangabandhu Sheikh Mujibur Rahman's 1971 rallying-call for Bangladeshi independence in We Shall Fight on the Beaches: The Speeches That Inspired History attracted attention as it was the first time the speech had been published in book form. His PhD dissertation has also been adapted into book form as London, Londoners and the Great Fire of 1666: Disaster and Recovery (2017).

== Selected publications ==
- One Bloody Thing After Another: The World's Gruesome History. Michael O'Mara Books, London, 2012.
- We Shall Fight on the Beaches: The Speeches That Inspired History. Michael O'Mara Books, London, 2013.
- D-Day in Numbers: The facts behind Operation Overlord. Michael O'Mara Books, London, 2014.
- London, Londoners and the Great Fire of 1666: Disaster and Recovery. Routledge, London, 2017. (Routledge Research in Early Modern History)
