= Adèle Euphrasie Barbier =

New Zealand Roman Catholic nun

Servant of God Adèle Euphrasie Barbier RNDM
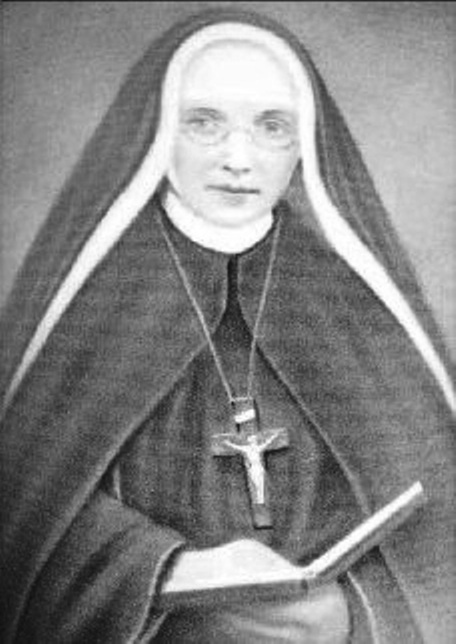
- Born: Adèle Euphrasie Barbier; 4 January 1829; Caen, Calvados, France
- Died: 18 January 1893 (aged 64); Sturry, Kent, England, United Kingdom

Adèle Euphrasie Barbier, religious name Mary of the Heart of Jesus, (4 January 1829 – 18 January 1893) was a New Zealand Roman Catholic religious sister, teacher and founder of a congregation of religious sisters.

Adèle was born in Caen, France, on 4 January 1829. Adèle Euphrasie Barbier was the founder of Congregation of Our Lady of the Missions. She worked in a laundry when she was 13 and opened her own laundry at home when she was 17.

Ever since she was a little girl Barbier had wanted to be a missionary. At 19 years of age she set off to Paris to join the congregation of the Sisters of Calvary which was just founded in 1840 by Fr Nicolas Chantome. On 6 August 1849 she got the religious habit and the name Marie of the Heart of Jesus.

In 1851, she travelled to London to learn English, in preparation for her missionary work. In 1860, she took over the Catherine Boys orphanage in Rectory Road, Deal, Kent, founding a convent which later ran St Ethelburga's and St. Mary's schools.

From 1872-1886, Barbier lived and worked in New Zealand, founding convents, schools and orphanages across the country. With three other sisters, she founded St Mary's Cathedral School in 1884 in Hamilton, which became Marian Catholic School on merging with Marist Intermediate in 1989. Barbier died at St Ann's Convent in Westbere, Kent, England on 18 January 1893.
