= Congregation of Our Lady of the Missions =

The Congregation of Our Lady of the Missions, also known as Sisters of Our Lady of the Missions (and as RNDM from the French name Religieuses de Notre Dame des Missions), is a Roman Catholic religious congregation of women. They were founded in Lyon, France, in 1861 by Adèle Euphrasie Barbier (1829 – 1893). The congregation has missions in Italy, Australia, Bangladesh, British Isles, Canada, France, India, Kenya, countries in Latin America, Myanmar, New Zealand, Papua New Guinea, Philippines, Samoa, Senegal and Vietnam.

Sisters of the Congregation were involved in the running of the Canadian residential schools including the Marieval Indian Residential School. The school was founded by four sisters of the Congregation of Our Lady of the Missions and was subsequently run by the Sisters of Saint Joseph of Saint-Hyacinthe.

== Sources ==
- Coulomb, Aimé (1902). Vie de la très révérende mère Marie du Cœur de Jésus, née Euphrasie Barbier (in French). Paris: Édition Vic et Amat.
- Couturier, Charles (1966). Droit est mon chemin. Toulouse: Éditions Prière et Vie, S.E.D.A.P.
