= M Amir-ul Islam =

Bangladeshi politician

- এম আমীর-উল ইসলাম
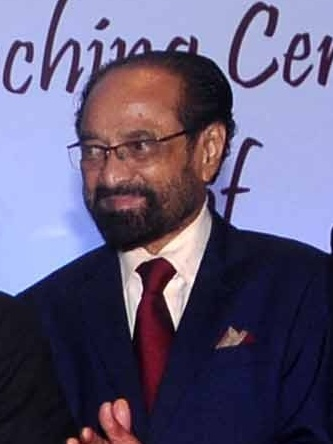
- M Amir-ul Islam in 2018.
- Born: 2 February 1936 (age 90); Kushtia, Bengal Province, British India
- Education: University of Dhaka
- Spouse: Jahanara Amir
- Children: Tania Amir
- Website: www.aalabd.com

M Amir-ul Islam (born 2 February 1936) is a Bangladeshi lawyer and politician. He drafted the proclamation of independence of Bangladesh in 1971 and was a member of the drafting committee of Bangladesh Constitution in 1972. He served as the State Minister of Food of the Government of Bangladesh during 1973–74.

== Education and career ==
Islam passed his matriculation in 1952 from Kushtia Muslim High School and intermediate exam in 1954 from Jagannath College, Dhaka. Islam completed his bachelor's degree in political science, economics and general history from the University of Dhaka in 1956. He was called to the bar at Lincoln's Inn, London in 1961.

== Bangladesh Liberation War ==
The 1970 general election, the first of its kind in Pakistan after years of military rule, was held on 7 December 1970. The Awami League, led by Sheikh Mujibur Rahman, secured 160 out of 300 seats, becoming the majority in the National Assembly. On 1 March, Yahya Khan postponed the inaugural session of the National Assembly on 3 March, indefinitely. According to him, "it was imperative to give more time to the political leaders to arrive at a reasonable understanding on the issue of Constitution making". Awami League president Sheikh Mujib immediately called for non-cooperation by his people, effectively taking control of East Pakistan. Mujib kept issuing regular directives to people and party workers. Amir-ul Islam, along with Tajuddin Ahmad, the general secretary of Awami League, and Kamal Hossain, were put in charge of drafting the directives.

On the night of 25 March, Islam and Tajuddin Ahmad left their homes and families and went into hiding. They secretly left Dhaka on 27 March for neighbouring India. After a perilous journey, mostly on foot through Kushtia and Chuadanga, they crossed the Indian border on 30 March. At the border outpost the regional head of the Indian border security force (BSF), Golok Majumdar received them. Majudmar immediately transported them to Kolkata with him. There, on the night of 30 March and the next day, Islam and Tajuddin had discussions with BSF chief Rustamji, who had come from Delhi after learning of their arrival. On 1 April, Islam and Tajuddin, accompanied by Majumdar, left for Delhi aboard a military cargo plane.

In Delhi, Tajuddin met with India's Prime Minister Indira Gandhi, on 4 April. At their second meeting the following day, Gandhi informed him that Sheikh Mujib had been arrested and transported to Pakistan though Pakistan had not made this official yet. Asked about the Bangladesh government, he replied, as Amir-ul Islam advised the day before, that a provisional government had been formed with Sheikh Mujib as its president with the senior Awami League leaders who had attended the Mujib-Yahya talks as cabinet members.

Islam drafted the proclamation of independence. Islam described the proclamation as the “birth certificate” of Bangladesh. The proclamation was read out at the oath-taking ceremony of the Mujibnagar Government on 17 April 1971. After the ceremony, Barrister Amir-ul-Islam showed the document to Subrata Roy Chowdhury, an Indian jurist of international law. Chowdhury found the document to be perfect and flawless, commenting that not a single word, comma or semi-colon needs to be changed and that the content of the proclamation was consistent with the recognized principles of international law. Inspired by the liberation of Bangladesh, Chowdhury later wrote the book ‘The genesis of Bangladesh’ in which he talked about Amir-ul-Islam's flawless drafting of the document.

== Personal life ==
Islam is married to Jahanara Amir, daughter of M Osman Ali. They have three children - one daughter, Barrister Tania Amir (b. 1964) and two sons, Adil Islam, a banker, and Zaid Islam, a photojournalist.

== Sources ==
- Islam, Barrister Amir-ul (1985). "৯: ব্যারিস্টার আমিরুল ইসলাম (সাক্ষাৎকার)" [9: Barrister Amir-ul Islam (Interview)]. In Rahman, Hasan Hafizur (ed.). বাংলাদেশের স্বাধীনতা যুদ্ধ: দলিলপত্র [History of Bangladesh War of Independence: Documents] (PDF) (in Bengali). Vol. 15. Dhaka: Ministry of Information, Government of the People's Republic of Bangladesh. pp. 51–110. ISBN 9844330912.
- Hossain, Doctor Kamal (1985). "১৮: ডক্টর কামাল হোসেন (সাক্ষাৎকার)" [18: Doctor Kamal Hossain (Interview)]. In —— (ed.). বাংলাদেশের স্বাধীনতা যুদ্ধ: দলিলপত্র [History of Bangladesh War of Independence: Documents] (PDF). Vol. 15. Dhaka: Ministry of Information, Government of the People's Republic of Bangladesh. pp. 143–193. ISBN 9844330912.
- Sobhan, Rehman (1985). "৩৬: রেহমান সোবহান (সাক্ষাৎকার)" [36: Rehman Sobhan (Interview)]. In —— (ed.). বাংলাদেশের স্বাধীনতা যুদ্ধ: দলিলপত্র [History of Bangladesh War of Independence: Documents] (PDF). Vol. 15. Dhaka: Ministry of Information, Government of the People's Republic of Bangladesh. pp. 263–293. ISBN 9844330912.
