= University Press Limited =

Bangladeshi publishing house

- Status: Active
- Founded: 1975; 51 years ago
- Founder: Mohiuddin Ahmed
- Country of origin: Bangladesh
- Headquarters location: Farmgate, Dhaka
- Key people: Mahrukh Mohiuddin (managing director)
- Publication types: Books, journals
- Nonfiction topics: Academic, history, biography
- Fiction genres: Poetry, juvenile fiction
- Official website: www.uplbooks.com

University Press Limited, commonly abbreviated as UPL, is an academic publishing house based in Dhaka, Bangladesh. UPL was established in 1975 as a successor to Oxford University Press' Dhaka branch where Mohiuddin Ahmed was chief executive. Its success in the publishing industry led to winning the National Book Centre Award 16 times since 1981. UPL is also the first publisher in Bangladesh to export books. As of 2018, UPL has published around 1,500 books.

== History ==
Mohiuddin Ahmed was initially posted at the Karachi office of Oxford University Press. After the Bangladesh liberation war, he returned to independent Bangladesh in 1972. He then became the Chief Executive of OUP Bangladesh and a roving editor coordinating the editorial activities in the branches of OUP in Dhaka, Delhi, Karachi and the East Asian branch in Malaysia.

When the OUP Bangladesh office in Dhaka was closed down in 1975, UPL took over the office and its publishing programme as the successor. Due to a lack of advanced command in Bengali literature, Ahmed focused on English language academic and research books. UPL signed a contract with OUP and Orient Longman to adapt school text books, initially starting with six books of OUP. As the successor of OUP, UPL also retained the local employees of the former.

In 2018, a function was arranged to celebrate the 40th founding anniversary of UPL at the Bangla Academy auditorium. For the first time, UPL Excellence Award was accorded to 41 different authors, institutions and patrons. The function was attended by Bangladesh's finance minister Abul Maal Abdul Muhith, Kamal Hossain, Rehman Sobhan, Mahfuz Anam, Rubana Huq, Moudud Ahmed, and Anisuzzaman, among others.

== Initiatives ==
=== Road to Bangladesh series ===
UPL's best known initiative is the Road to Bangladesh series, initiated in the early 1990s, which is an ongoing book series on Bangladesh Liberation War to portray different perspectives on the event. The level of accuracy and expertise of the books in this series have made them highly valued among scholars.

=== Adopt-a-Library ===
In 2017, UPL initiated the Adopt-a-Library program which is aimed at improving the reading habit of the youth in Bangladesh. In cooperation with Lift Up Asia and Asialoka Trust, the program is designed to increase the accessibility of books to the readers around the country. The program also lends support to the institution-based libraries of different "primary and secondary schools, colleges, young learners’ centers, private and government universities, and madrassas". The scheme offers three bundles of books to the libraries to choose from, comprising 30 books each with a plan to increase the numbers in the future. The institutions would apply to the program website to receive one of the bundles and to get onto the waiting list while the donors would select an institution from the list and the number of bundles to sponsor. A confirmation of donation would result in the bundles reaching the institution. As of 2019, at least 1,200 institutions have responded to the program.
