= Mujibnagar =

Town in Bangladesh; capital of the Provisional Government of Bangladesh

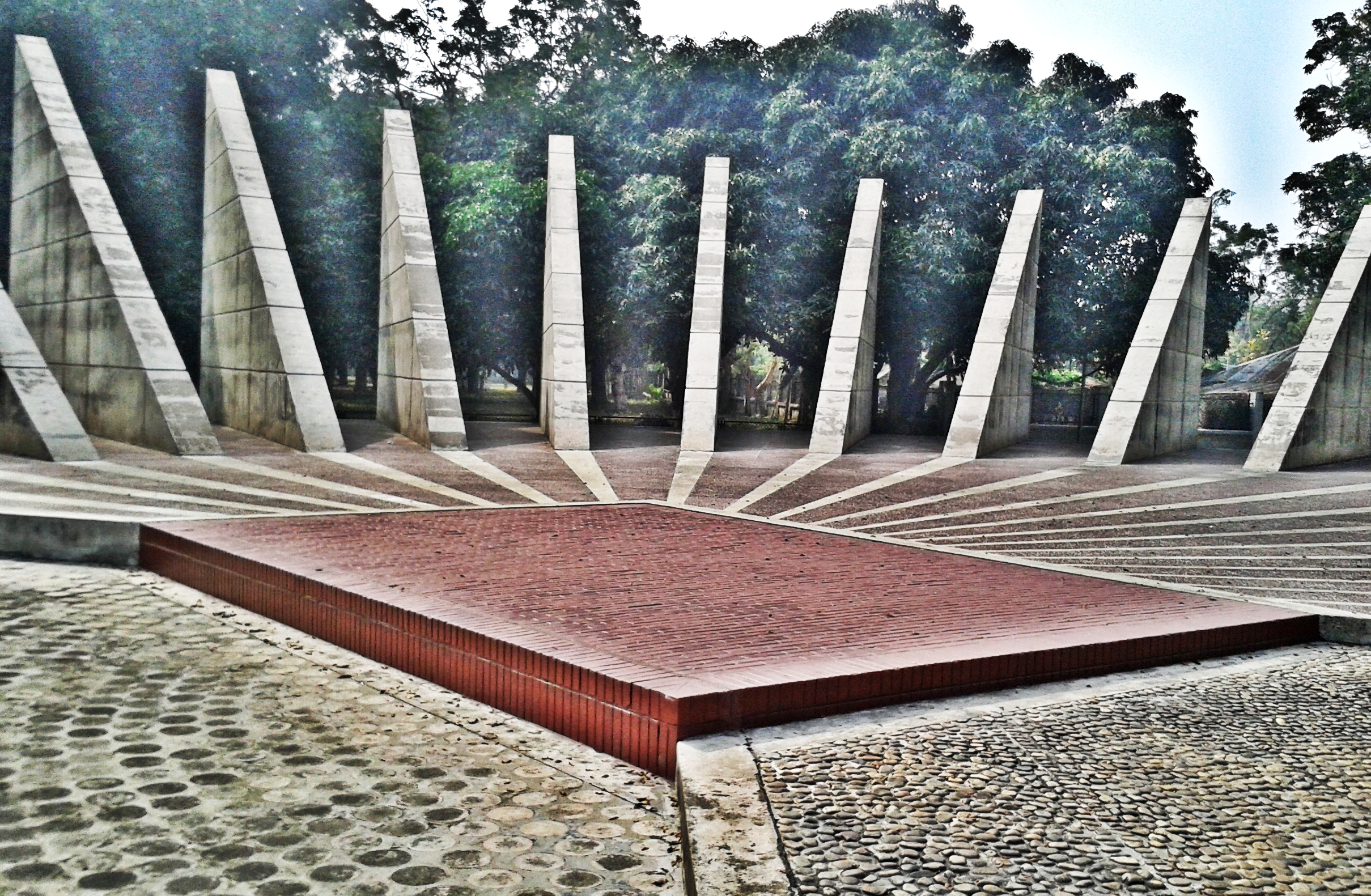
- The Mujibnagar monument has 23 pillars, some of which are shown here, representing the 23 years of Pakistani rule over East Bengal before it became independent as Bangladesh. The red brick square marks the spot where the Mujibnagar government ministers took their oaths.
- Interactive map of Mujibnagar
- Coordinates: 23.647142°N 88.5935448°E

Mujibnagar (Bengali: মুজিবনগর), formerly known as Baidyanathtala (Boiddonathtola) and Bhoborpara, is a town in the Mujibnagar Upazila of Meherpur District in Khulna, Bangladesh. The Provisional Government of Bangladesh was formed on 10 April 1971, however, sworn in on 17 April 1971 in this place by the elected representatives of the Bengalees (mostly belongling to Awami League), that led the Bangladesh Liberation War, who were leading the guerrilla war for the independence of Bangladesh (then East Pakistan) from Pakistan in 1971. The place was renamed Mujibnagar by the proclamation of independence, in honour of then imprisoned Bangabandhu Sheikh Mujibur Rahman, who had declared Bangladesh independent. The actual capital of the government while in exile was Calcutta. A memorial complex covering 20.10 acres (8.13 ha) has been built at the site where the ministers of that first government took their oaths.

== Formation ==
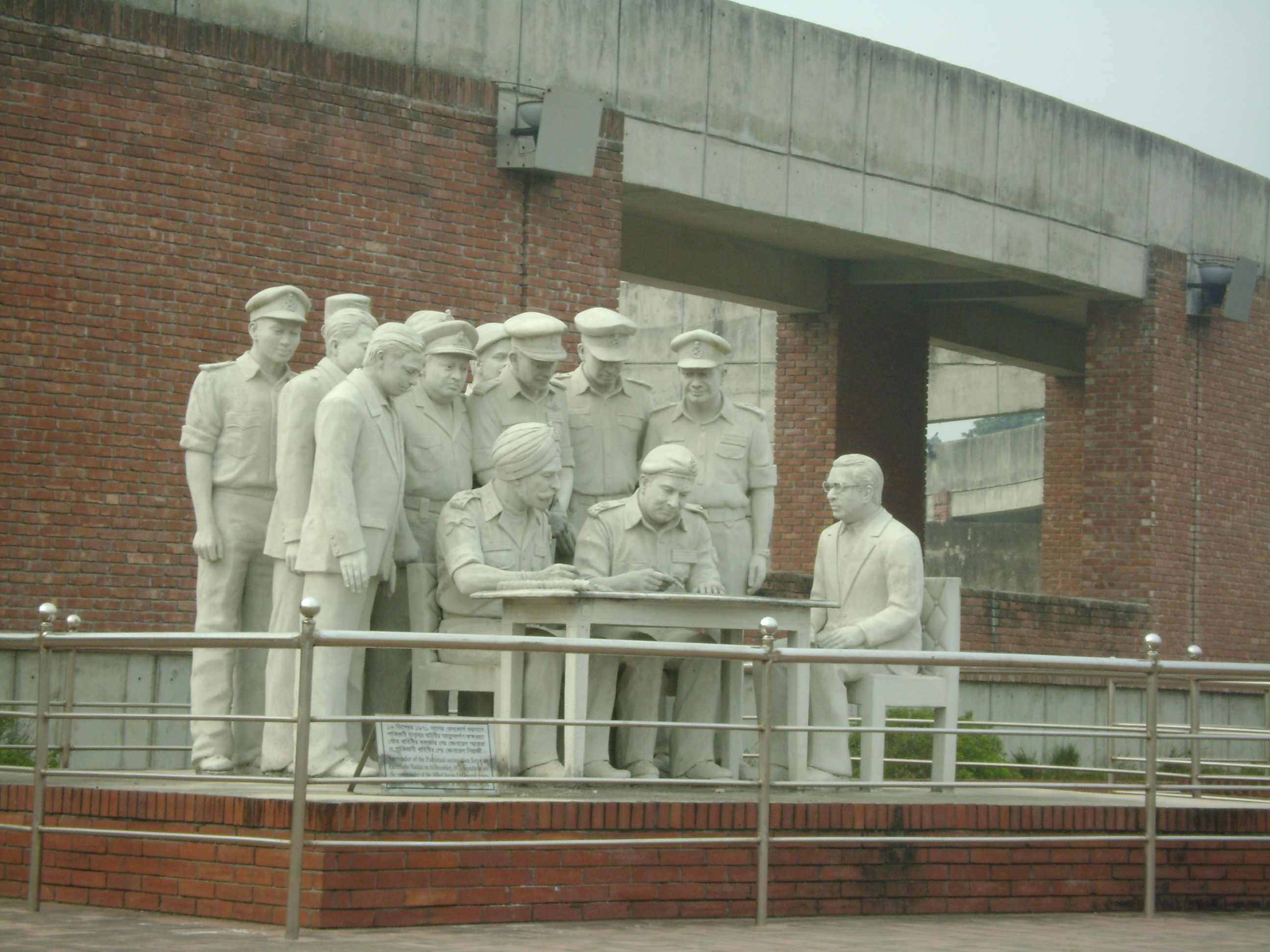
Statue representing the signing of the Pakistani Instrument of Surrender at the Mujibnagar Memorial Monument and Complex

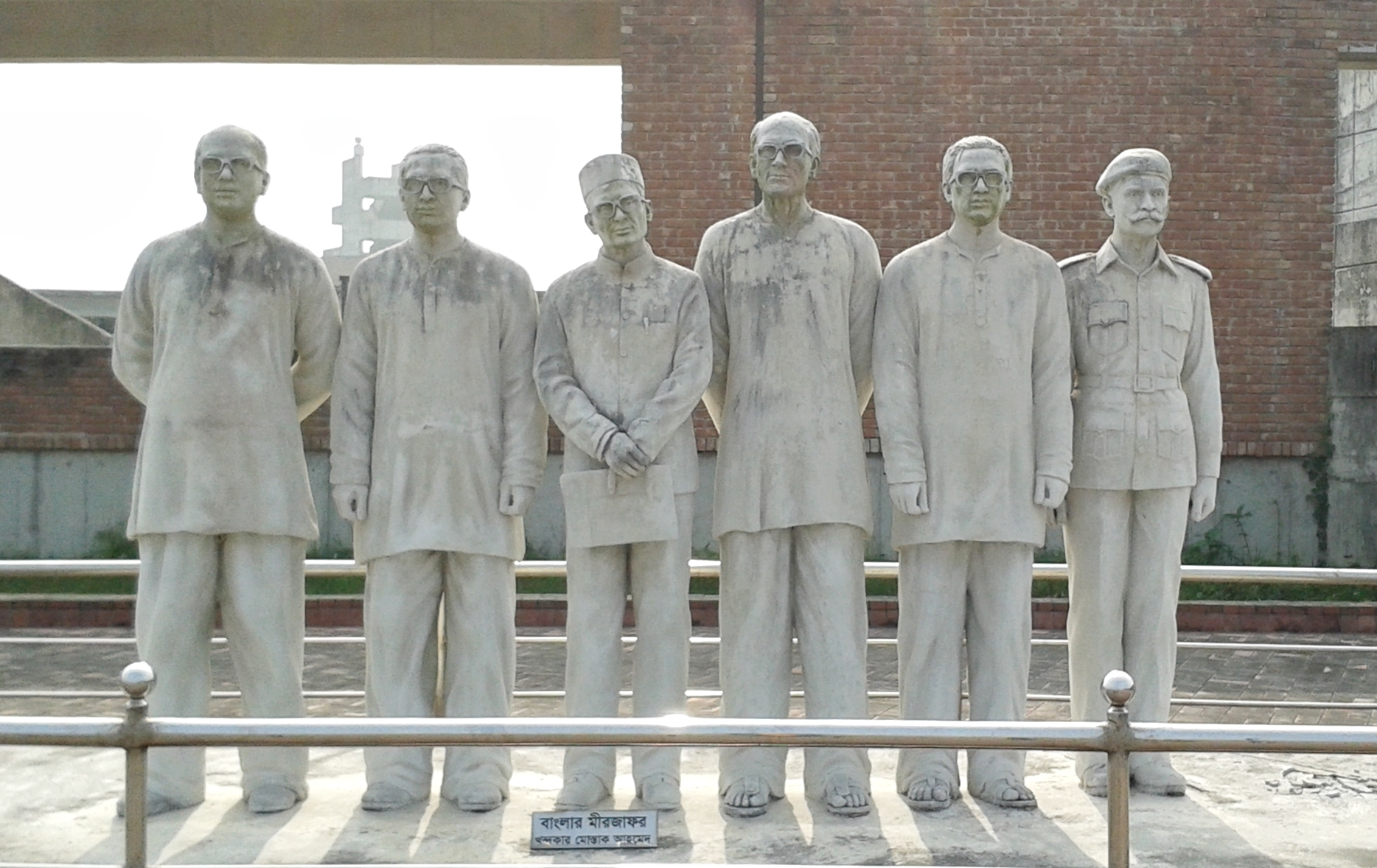
Sculpture of Cabinet members of the Provisional Government of Bangladesh; popularly known as Mujibnagar Government

Following the failure of last-ditch talks on the formation of a government, Pakistani president Yahya Khan ordered the Pakistani Army to launch Operation Searchlight to suppress the nationalist movement. On March 25, 1971 the leader of the Awami League Sheikh Mujibur Rahman signed an official declaration and called upon the people to resist the occupation forces through a radio message. After he was arrested by Pakistan Army and moved to a jail in West Pakistan, M A Hannan, Ziaur Rahman broadcast the announcement of the declaration of independence on behalf of Sheikh Mujibur on 26 March and 27 March respectively and exhorted the Bengali people to resist the Pakistani state forces.

The senior political leaders of the Awami League congregated at the town of Baidyanathtala, which was mainly a mango grove located in Meherpur, when it was a subdivision of Kushtia. The area was still one of the few remaining liberated zones along the borders of East Pakistan. The venue was selected by a 10-man high powered scouting team of the Indian Air Force, Indian Army Artillery, BSF Scouts, and RAW, and East Pakistan Rifles officers, authorised personally by Indira Gandhi. The venue was guarded by a 200 strong detachment of the District Police including District Armed Police, led by the SDPO, and the Ansars/VDP. Perimeter security was established by three Platoons of the EPR and a 100-strong straggling force of local Mukti Bahini volunteers and retired/on leave Army regular soldiers, commanded by Major Abu Osman Chowdhury. The Indians had brought 2 Battalions of BSF armed with 3-inch mortars and Heavy Machine Guns and an Army Artillery battery (eight 25 Pounder Guns and counter battery radars) to ringfence the area from any Pakistani intrusion and provide fire support to the EPR and Mukti forces. Outside the Indian perimeter, at Chapra, waited two Commando Platoons of the Indian Para SF with 4 Chetak helicopters, and a standing Air Patrol of the Indian Air Force consisting of six Hawker Hunters. Inaugurating the government of the People's Republic of Bangladesh on April 17, the national anthem Amar Sonar Bangla was sung in chorus. Although Sheikh Mujib was declared the first President, Syed Nazrul Islam was appointed acting president and hoisted the flag of Bangladesh. Tajuddin Ahmad was appointed the first prime minister.

== See also ==
- Mujibnagar Memorial
