= Anisul Hoque =

Bangladeshi writer

- আনিসুল হক
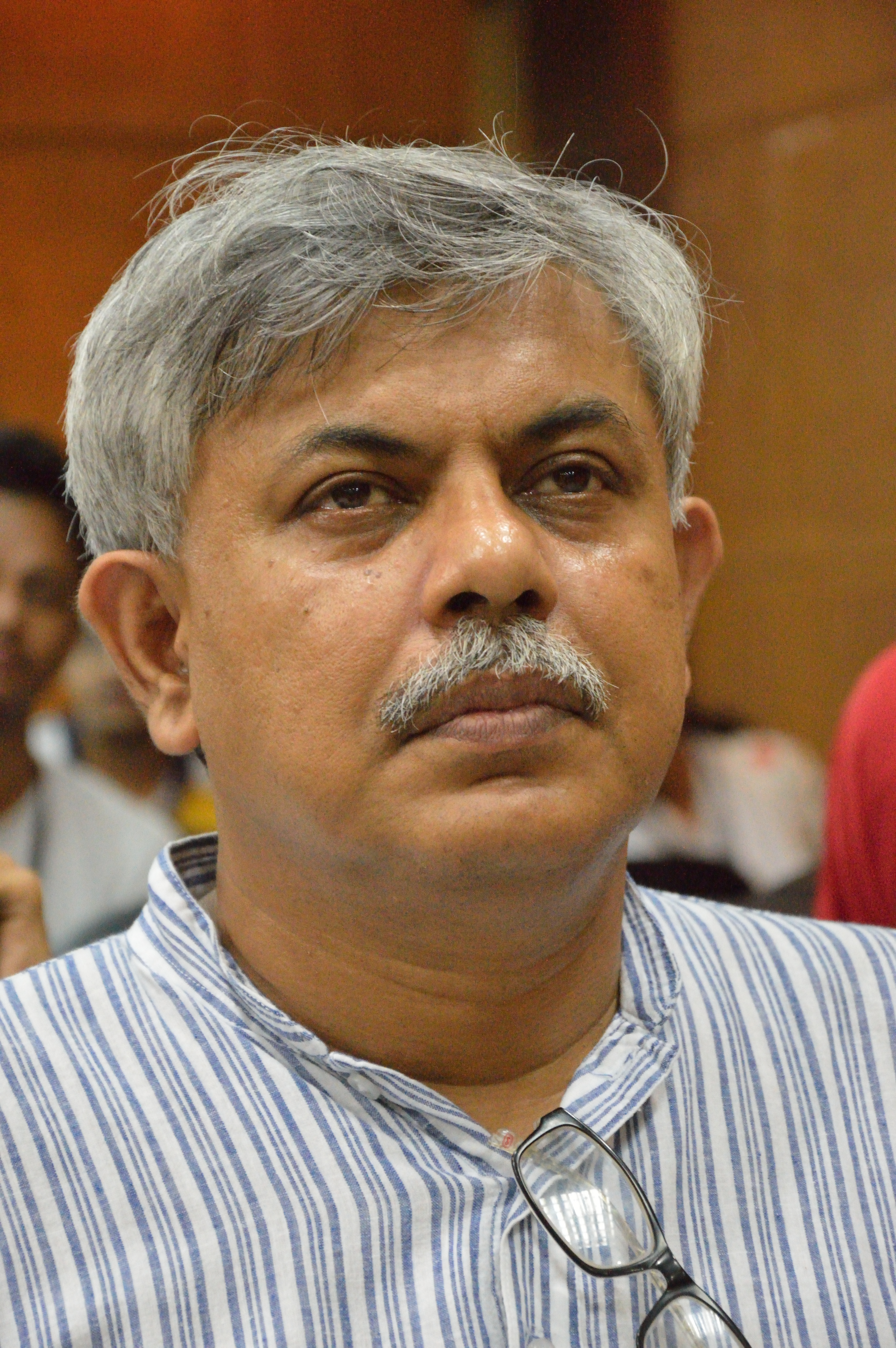
- Anisul Hoque in 2015
- Born: 4 March 1965 (age 61); Nilphamari District, Bangladesh
- Education: B.Sc. in Civil Engineering
- Alma mater: Rangpur Zilla School, Bangladesh University of Engineering and Technology
- Occupations: Journalist, writer, editor
- Writing career
- Language: Bengali
- Notable work: Maa (Mother)
- Notable awards: full list

Anisul Hoque (born 4 March 1965) is a Bangladeshi author, screenwriter, novelist, dramatist and journalist from Rangpur. He won the Bangla Academy Literary Award in 2011. His most popular work is his non-fiction novel Maa (mother). He is also the editor of Kishore Alo. In addition, he is one of the two writers of the film Television (2012 film).

== Early life and education ==
Anisul Hoque was born in Nilphamari in 1965 to Mofazzal Hoque and Mst Anwara Begum. He was the student of Rangpur PTI primary school. He passed SSC exam from Rangpur Zilla School in 1981 and HSC exam from Rangpur Carmichael College in 1983. He graduated from Bangladesh University of Engineering and Technology (BUET), trained as a civil engineer.

== Career ==
Anisul Hoque's inspiration in journalism and writing started during his student life. After his graduation, he joined to serve as a government employee but resigned only after 15 days. Instead, he started working as a journalist. He attended the International Writing Program at the University of Iowa in 2010. Currently, Anisul Hoque is working as an associate editor of a Bengali-language daily Prothom Alo and the editor of monthly youth magazine Kishor Alo.

== Personal life ==
Anisul Hoque is married to Marina Yasmin. They have a daughter, Padya Paramita.

== Criticism ==
Matiur Rahman, Anisul Hoque and Mahfuz Anam helped Simin Rahman, mother of Faraaz Ayaaz Hossain, who donated 73 crore Taka for the film Faraaz, giving advice to donate on making film with a false narrative to hide the information about his son Faraz being a militant in 2016 Dhaka Holey Artisan attack, instead showing him as a saviour hero.

Hoque has expressed caution regarding the immediate documentation and evaluation of contemporary political movements, such as the July 2024 uprising in Bangladesh. He believes that such historical events require a safe temporal distance—such as 10, 20, or 100 years—to be assessed objectively, noting that immediate accounts often lack the perspective needed for accurate historical analysis. He opined that, now it is time to work on liberation war because it is in safe zone because of far distance of time. In support of this view, he has drawn comparisons to the immediate writings following the 2013 Shahbag protests, suggesting that those initial evaluations are subject to later revision as time passes.

== Literary works ==
=== Poetry ===
- Khola Chithi Sundarer Kachhe
- Ami Achhi Amar Anale
- Jalrang Padya
- Asale Ayur Cheye Baro Shaadh Tar Akash Dekhar
- Tomake Bhabna Kori
- Tomake Na Paoar Kabita (2013) by Prothoma

=== Novels ===
- Ondhokarer Eksho Bochhor (1995)
- Kheya (The Ferryboat) (1996)
- Fand (Trap) (1997)
- Bristibondhu (The Rain Friend) (1997)
- Amar Ekta Dukhkho Achhe (I have a Sorrow) (1999)
- Se (The Person) (2002)
- Maa (Mother) (2003)
- Abar Tora Kipte Ho
- Dushwapner Jatri (2006) ISBN 984-458-532-5
- Khuda o Bhalobashar Galpo
- Nandini (2006) ISBN 984-437-341-7
- Alo Andhokare Jai (2007)
- Dhukhpari Shukhpari (Fairy of Sadness Fairy of Happiness)
- Trap (translated from Bengali to English by Inam Ahmed, published by Indian Age, ISBN 819-069-563-0)
- Ayeshamangal (translated into English as The Ballad of Ayesha)

=== Television drama ===
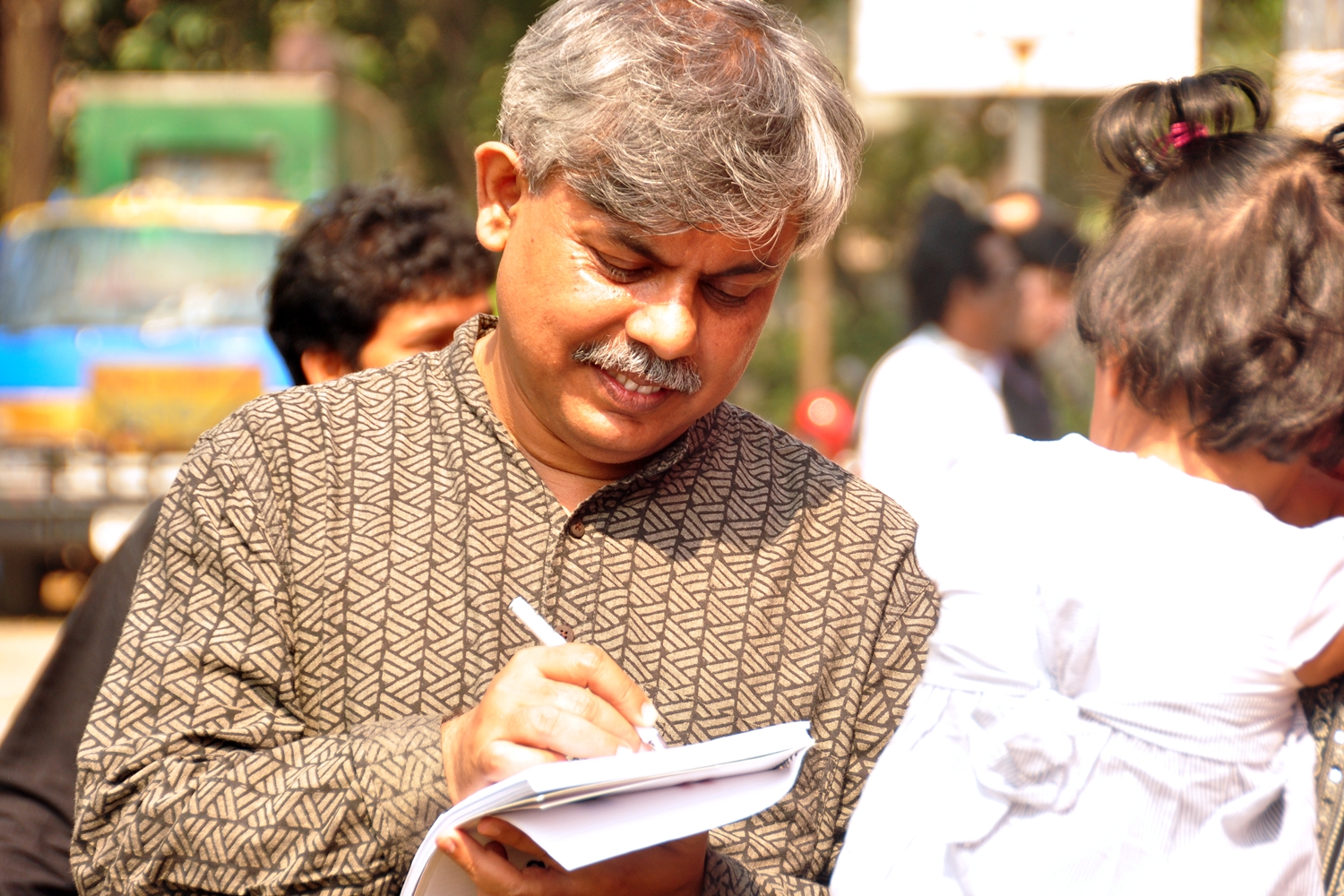
Anisul Hoque at "Borno Mela" at Sultana Kamal Mohila Krira Complex, Dhanmondi (2013)

- Ekannoborti
- Choruibhati
- Naal Piran (Red Shirt)
- Korimon Bewa
- Ghure Daranor Swapno
- 69
- No Man's Land
- Doinik Tolpar
- Nikhoj Shongbad
- Radio Chocolate 69.0 FM

=== Film script writer ===
- Bachelor, 2004
- Made in Bangladesh (directed by Mostofa Sarwar Farooki)
- Third Person Singular Number
- Swapnodanay (On the Wings of Dreams) (2007)
- Television (film) (2013) with director Mostofa Sarwar Farooki

== Awards ==
- Bangla Academy Literary Award (2011)
- CitiBank Ananda Alo Award for Best Novel (2009)
- Khalekdad Chowdhury Literature Award 1415
- Television, a film script jointly written by Mostofa Sarwar Farooki and Anisul Hoque, has received Asian Cinema Fund (script development), provided by South Korea's Pusan Film Festival
- Euro Shishu Shahitya Award (2006)
- BACHSAS Award for Best Screenplay
- TENASINAS Award for Best Screenplay
