= Subrata Roy Chowdhury =

Indian lawyer

Subrata Roy Chowdhury is an Indian lawyer in the Supreme Court of India and in the Calcutta High Court. He is known for his works on international human rights law. He reviewed the proclamation of independence of Bangladesh written by M Amir-ul Islam in 1971.

== Career ==
Chowdhury is an activist in the area of international human rights law. In 1972 he published a book studying the legal aspects of 9 months war in the then East Pakistan (present day Bangladesh).

According to Professor Richard Lillich, the Paris Minimum Standards of Human Rights Norms in a State of Emergency adopted by the International Law Association in 1984 were originally Chowdhury's idea. Chowdhury chaired the ILA sub-committee for drafting and revising the Paris Minimum Standards. As chairman of the sub-committee, Chowdhury expands on the Paris Minimum Standards by detailed analysis of state practice and the work of international monitoring bodies.

The Paris Minimum Standards are based on norms derived from international human rights covenants. They are intended to ensure that the rule of law is upheld even after a bona fide declaration of a state of emergency. It follows the format of the ILA report on the Paris Minimum Standards and is divided into three sections. The first section of the book sets forth and analyzes the minimum standards that should be observed with respect to the declaration, duration and control of a national state of emergency. The second section deals with the general principles to be observed with respect to the suspension or limitation of the rights of the individual and the role of the legislature and the judiciary in ensuring the protection of such rights. The third section sets forth and describes the non-derogable rights and freedoms that may not be suspended or limited even during a state of emergency.

== Works ==
- Roy Chowdhury, S. (1989). Rule of law in a state of emergency : the Paris minimum standards of human rights norms in a state of emergency. New York, St. Martin's Press.
- Roy Chowdhury, S. (1972). The genesis of Bangladesh; a study in international legal norms and permissive conscience. Bombay; New York, Asia Pub. House
