= Hasan Hafizur Rahman =

Bangladeshi journalist (1932–1983)

Hasan Hafizur Rahman (Bengali: হাসান হাফিজুর রহমান; 1932–1983) became the editor of the daily Bengali newspaper Danik Bangla right after the Bangladesh Liberation War in 1971. He also worked for the government as a high official and edited an account of the independence struggle called The Liberation War of Bangladesh, which was published in sixteen volumes. He was the author of thirteen books including eight collections of poetry and Adhunik Kobi O Kobita (Modern Poets and Poetry), a book of critical essays.

== Awards ==
- Adamjee Literary Award (1967)
- Bangla Academy Literary Award (1971)
- Ekushey Padak (1984)
