= Outline of Pakistan military history =

The following is an outline of English language Wikipedia articles related to the military history of Pakistan from the Pakistan Movement in 1947.

== Overview articles ==
- History of Pakistan
- Timeline of Pakistani history
- History of Pakistan (1947–present)
- Pakistan Armed Forces

- Pakistan Army
- Pakistan Navy
- Pakistan Air Force
- National Guard (Pakistan)
- Civil Armed Forces

== Military operations history ==
=== Indo-Pakistani war of 1947–1948 ===
A war fought between India and Pakistan (Note: The Indo-Pakistani war of 1947–1948 is also known as the First Kashmir War) over the territory of Jammu and Kashmir from 1947 to 1948.

- Battle of Pandu
- 1947 Poonch rebellion
- Battle of Badgam
- Military operations in Ladakh (1948)
- Military operations in Poonch (1948)
- Battle of Muzaffarabad
- Operation Bison (Jammu & Kashmir 1948)
- Operation Datta Khel
- Siege of Skardu
- Stand Down Order (1947)

=== Insurgency in Balochistan 1948–Present ===
An insurgency by Baloch nationalists and Islamist militants against the governments of Pakistan and Iran in the Balochistan region, including Balochistan, Pakistan with occurring large scale-conflicts throughout the insurgency.

- First Balochistan conflict
- Second Balochistan conflict
- Third Balochistan conflict
- Sistan and Baluchestan insurgency
- 1973 raid on the Iraqi embassy in Pakistan
- 2006 Pakistan landmine blast
- 2021 Machh attack
- 2023 Barkhan bombing
- 2023 Zhob suicide attack
- 1970s operation in Balochistan
- Human rights abuses in Balochistan
- List of journalists killed during the Balochistan conflict (1947–present)
- 2023 Kandahari Bazar bombing
- 2022 Kech District attack
- 2022 Lahore bombing
- 2023 Muslim Bagh attack
- January 2013 Pakistan bombings
- Pakistan International Airlines Flight 544
- Turbat killings

=== Bajaur Campaign 1960 ===
Bajaur Campaign: a series of armed conflicts between Afghanistan and Pakistan that occurred between September 1960 and September 1961 in Bajaur, Pakistan.

=== Ran of Kutch Conflict ===
An armed conflict which occurred in the Ran of Kutch conflict prior to the Indo-Pakistani war of 1965, also a preludge to the later the Indo-Pakistani war of 1965. (Note: The ran of kutch conflict, also known as Ran of Kutch war or Operation Desert Hawk)

=== Indo-Pakistani war of 1965 ===
An armed conflict between Pakistan and India (Note: The Indo-Pakistani war of 1965 is also known as the Second India–Pakistan War) that took place from August 1965 to September 1965.

- Battle of Asal Uttar
- Battle of Chawinda
- Battle of Dograi
- Battle of Haji Pir Pass (1965)
- Battle of Burki
- Operation Gibraltar
- Operation Grand Slam
- Gujarat Beechcraft incident
- Battle of Ichogil Bund
- The India-Pakistan Air War of 1965
- Indo-Pakistani air war of 1965
- Operation Dwarka
- Battle of Phillora

=== Bangladesh Liberation War ===
Overview

- Bangladesh genocide
- Evolution of Pakistan Eastern Command plan
- Gopalpur massacre
- Independence of Bangladesh
- Jinjira massacre
- Military plans of the Bangladesh Liberation War
- Operation Barisal
- Operation Hotel Intercontinental
- Operation Jackpot
- Operation Omega
- Operation Searchlight
- Prisoners of war in the Indo-Pakistani war of 1971
- Proclamation of Bangladeshi Independence
- Provisional Government of Bangladesh
- Rape during the Bangladesh Liberation War

Events

- 1971 Dhaka University massacre
- 1971 killing of Bengali intellectuals
- Bakhrabad massacre
- Bangla College killing field
- Barguna massacre
- Battle of Boyra
- Burunga massacre
- East Pakistan Air Operations (1971)
- Gopalpur massacre
- Jinjira massacre
- Operation Barisal
- Operation Hotel Intercontinental
- Operation Jackpot
- Operation Omega
- Operation Searchlight
- Pakistan International Airlines Flight 712

Units and organizations

- Al-Badr (East Pakistan)
- Al-Shams (East Pakistan)
- Baten Bahini
- Border Guard Bangladesh
- Crack Platoon
- East Pakistan Central Peace Committee
- Hemayet Bahini
- K Force (Bangladesh)
- Kader Bahini
- Ministry of Liberation War Affairs (Bangladesh)
- Mukti Bahini
- NAP-Communist Party-Students Union Special Guerrilla Forces
- National Freedom Fighter Council
- PNS Mangro (S133)
- Razakars (Pakistan)
- S Force (Bangladesh)
- Z Force (Bangladesh)

Locations

- Bharat-Bangladesh Maitri Udyan
- Kalurghat
- Melaghar Camp
- Mujibnagar
- Suhrawardy Udyan

Other

- Bangladesh Field Hospital
- Chorompotro
- Durgapur Free Day
- Joy Bangla
- List of sectors in the Bangladesh Liberation War
- Mass Uprising Day
- Mirpur Mukto Dibos
- Mujibnagar Day
- Pakistan Army order of battle, December 1971
- Pakistani Instrument of Surrender
- Pakistani order of battle for Operation Searchlight in 1971
- Swadhin Bangla Betar Kendra

=== Soviet-Afghan War ===
The Soviet–Afghan War was a protracted armed conflict fought in the Soviet-controlled Democratic Republic of Afghanistan (DRA) from 1979 to 1989. The war was a major conflict of the Cold War as it saw extensive fighting between the DRA, the Soviet Union and allied paramilitary groups against the Afghan mujahedeen and their allied foreign fighters. While the mujahedeen were backed by various countries and organizations, the majority of their support came from Pakistan, the United States (as part of Operation Cyclone), the United Kingdom, China, Iran, and the Arab states of the Persian Gulf.

- Raids inside Soviet Union during Soviet Afghan War
- Battle of Arghandab (1987)
- Operation Arrow
- Operation Curtain
- Battle of Jaji
- Siege of Khost
- Operation Magistral
- Battle of Maravar Pass
- Battles of Zhawar
- First Battle of Zhawar
- Second Battle of Zhawar
- Siege of Urgun
- Operation Typhoon (1989)
- Operation Trap
- Tajbeg Palace assault
- Panjshir Front
- Panjshir offensives (Soviet–Afghan War)
- Marmoul offensives
- Afghan-Soviet SCUD attacks in Pakistan

=== War in North-West Pakistan 2004–Present ===
The insurgency in Khyber Pakhtunkhwa, also known as the War in North-West Pakistan or Pakistan's war on terror, is an ongoing armed conflict involving Pakistan and Islamist militant groups, and elements of organized crime.

Beginning of war Order of Battle

First Phase:- (2004 – 2017)

- Order of Battle
- Battle of Wanna
- Operation al-Mizan
- Battle of Mirali
- Waziristan Accord (short-lived peace agreement in North Waziristan)
- Operation Sunrise
- First Battle of Swat
- Operation Zalzala
- Battle of Bajaur
- Operation Sirat-e-Mustaqeem
- Second Battle of Swat
- Operation Rah-e-Nijat
- 2009 Khyber Pass offensive
- Operation Janbaz
- Nizam-e-Adl Regulation 2009 (failed peace agreement)
- Mohmand Offensive
- Operation Black Thunderstorm
- Orakzai and Kurram offensive
- Killing of Osama bin Laden
- Operation Koh-e-Sufaid
- Operation Rah-e-Shahadat
- Operation Khyber
- Operation Zarb-e-Azb

Beginning of nationwide large scale operations against insurgency Second phase:- (2017 – present)

- Operation Radd-ul-Fasaad
- Afghanistan-Pakistan border barrier
- Federally Administered Tribal Areas
- Newly Merged Tribal Districts
- Tribal law Regulation
- Written constitution of Pakistan
- Drone strikes in Pakistan
- 2022 Pakistani airstrikes in Afghanistan
- Pakistan and Tehrik-i-Taliban Pakistan peace talks
- Deportation of undocumented Afghans from Pakistan
- Jundallah
- Jamaat-ul-Ahrar
- Islamic Movement of Uzbekistan
- ISIL
- Tehreek-e-Nafaz-e-Shariat-e-Mohammadi
- Pakistani Taliban
- Taliban
- Lashkar-e-Taiba
- Lashkar-e-Jhangvi
- Lashkar-e-Islam
- Islamic Movement of Uzbekistan
- Al-Qaeda
- Turkistan Islamic Party
- Islamic State-Khorasan Province
- Jaish ul-Adl
- Sipah-e-Sahaba
- BLA
- UBA
- BRA
- BNA
- BLF

== Units and formations ==
- 11th Cavalry (Frontier Force)
- Furqan Force
- Ladakh Scouts
- Nubra Guards
- 5th Battalion, 4 Gorkha Rifles
- PNS Ghazi

== Geography ==
- Kharian
- Khemkaran
- Sialkot

== Agreements and statements ==
- Tashkent Declaration
- United Nations Security Council Resolution 209
- United Nations Security Council Resolution 210
- United Nations Security Council Resolution 211
- United Nations Security Council Resolution 214
- United Nations Security Council Resolution 215

== Military history related lists ==
- List of Pakistan Air Force bases
- Pakistan Air Force ranks and insignia
- List of Pakistan Air Force squadrons
- List of retired Pakistan Air Force aircraft
- List of drone strikes in Pakistan
- List of forts in Pakistan
- List of missiles of Pakistan
- Pakistan Navy ranks and insignia
- List of wars involving Pakistan

== Other military history related articles ==
- Afghanistan–Pakistan border skirmishes
- Indo-Pakistani wars and conflicts
- Afghan conflict
- British Indian Army
- Military history of Pakistan
- List of wars involving Pakistan
- United States-Pakistan skirmishes
