= Daudi =

- Iliyas Daudi (born 1967) is a former Soviet and Russian military serviceman, Hero of Russian Federation.
- Zamir Daudi (born 1987) is an Afghan footballer.
- Hiyya al-Daudi (born 1154) was a prominent rabbi, composer, and poet of Andalusia.

== See also ==
- Daoudi, a surname
- Dawoodi Bohra, Ismaili Shia sect from Gujarat, India
- Daudi Cwa II of Buganda, Kabaka of the Kingdom of Buganda from 1897 until 1939
