= Independence of Bangladesh =

Detachment of East Pakistan from Pakistan

Independence of Bangladesh বাংলাদেশের স্বাধীনতা
- Flag of Bangladesh during the Liberation War

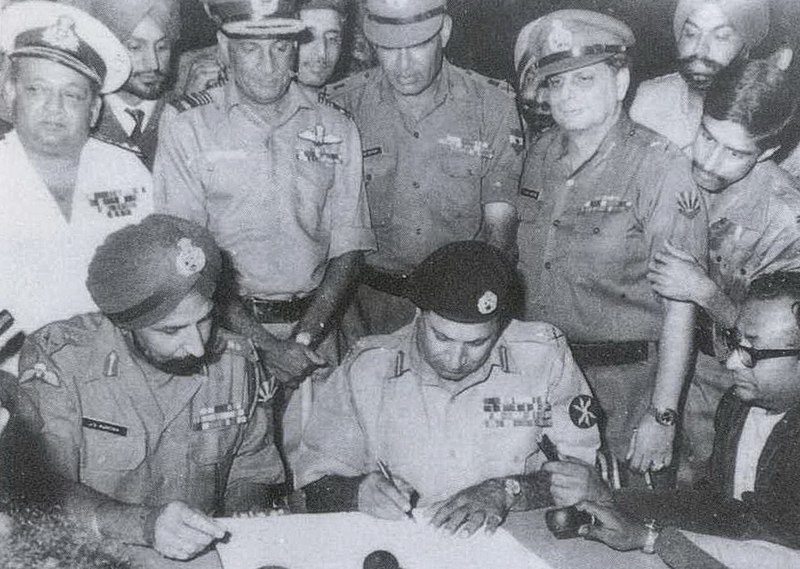
- The signing of the Pakistani Instrument of Surrender on 16 December 1971 at the Ramna Race Course, Dacca, which is now known as the Suhrawardy Udyan
- Date: 26 March 1971 (declared); 16 December 1971 (attained)
- Duration: c. 1948 – 16 December 1971 (23 years, 11 months and 15 days)
- Location: East Pakistan (today Bangladesh)
- Outcome: Independence of Bangladesh; secession of East Pakistan from Pakistan
- Casualties: ~40,000 military personnel killed (including Bangladesh, Indian and Pakistani forces); 300,000 – 3,000,000 civilian deaths
- Injuries: ~14,000 wounded
- Arrests: 90,000 – 93,000 captured
- Convicted: 11 (including 9 leaders of Jamaat-e-Islami)
- Trial: International Crimes Tribunal, Bangladesh
- Awards: Bir Sreshtho; Bir Uttom; Bir Bikrom; Bir Protik; Bangladesh Freedom Honour

Independence of Bangladesh
- 1948–1971
| Pakistan period | Post-independence period |
- Leader(s): A. K. Fazlul Huq, Hussain Shaheed Suhrawardy, Abdul Hamid Khan Bhashani, Sheikh Mujibur Rahman, Tajuddin Ahmad, M. A. G. Osmani, Ziaur Rahman, Serajul Alam Khan
- Key events: Bengali language movement; 1954 Provincial election; Six Point Movement; 1969 Mass uprising; 1970 General election; Non-cooperation movement; Operation Searchlight; Arrest of Sheikh Mujibur Rahman; Provisional Government; Bangladesh Liberation War; Genocide; Surrender of Pakistani Forces

The independence of Bangladesh was declared from Pakistan on 26 March 1971, which is now celebrated as Independence Day. The Bangladesh Liberation War started on 26 March and lasted till 16 December 1971 which is celebrated as Victory Day in Bangladesh.

== History ==
=== Background ===
In 1905, the British Raj partitioned the Bengal Presidency into East Bengal and West Bengal. The British introduced the Morley-Minto Reforms in 1909 which made the electorate system based on religion and East Bengal was largely Muslim. The Bengal Provincial Muslim League was created to represent Bengali Muslims. The two Bengals were reunited in 1912 in a decision by the British which was unpopular among the Muslims which feared it would harm the interests of their community. The 1946 Cabinet Mission to India decided to partition Bengal and in 1947 Bengal was partitioned again. West Bengal went to India and East Bengal went to Pakistan becoming East Pakistan. The Partition of India took place along religious lines with Muslim majority areas going to Pakistan.

=== Path to independence ===
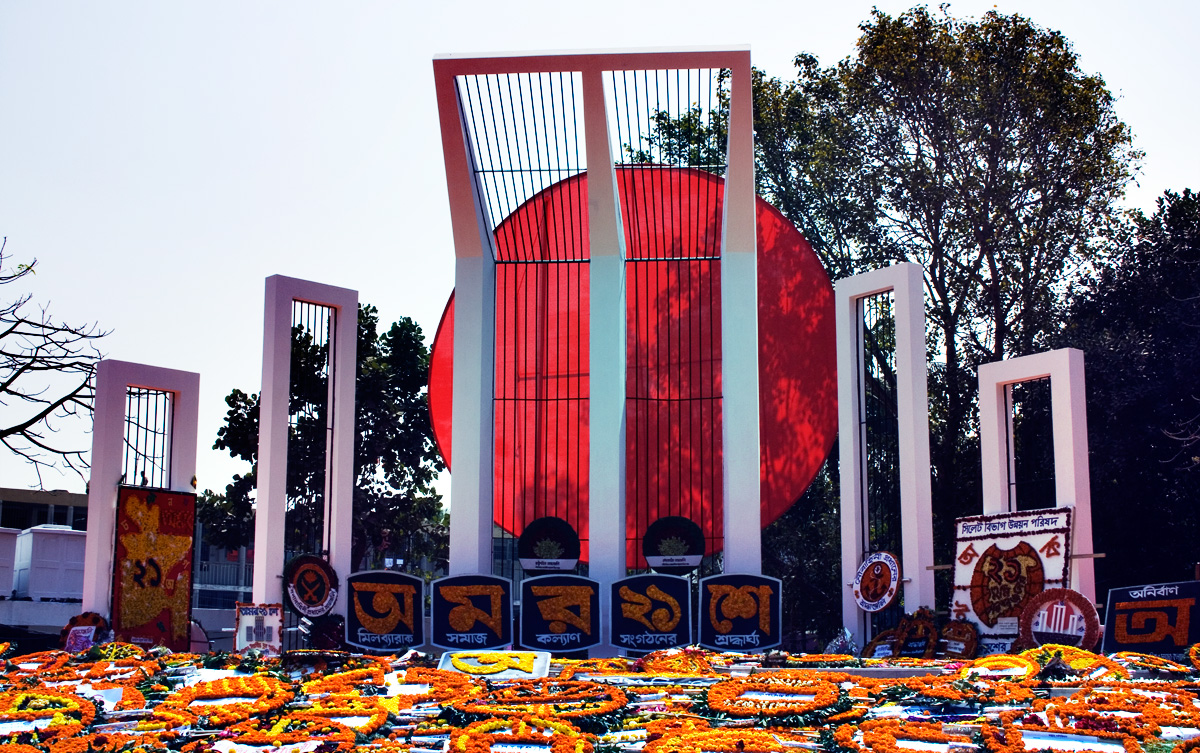
Shaheed Minar, Dhaka commemorates the language movement.

An organization called "Inner Group" was formed in 1947 before the independence of Pakistan. It was active in the 1950s with Indian help to separate East Bengal from Pakistan and form a new state. Members of the organisations from Bengal Provincial Muslim League following the ideals of Netaji Subhas Chandra Bose were close to Sheikh Mujibur Rahman. This organization based in Dhaka wanted to engage in armed struggle with the help of Great Britain under the leadership of Sheikh Mujibur Rahman. East Pakistan, where Bengali was the language spoken by the majority, opposed the move by the founder of Pakistan, Mohammed Ali Jinnah, to make Urdu the national language. The people of East Pakistan demanded Bengali be made a national language in the Bengali Language movement. Krishak Sramik Party demanded autonomy for East Bengal in 1953 and won the provincial election against the Pakistan Muslim League in 1954. A. K. Fazlul Huq, leader of the Krishak Sramik Party, becomes the chief minister of East Pakistan. On 31 May 1954, the Krishak Sramik Party was removed from power. Chief Minister A. K. Fazlul Huq and party general secretary Sheikh Mujibur Rahman were placed under house arrest on charges of separatism.

After Ayub Khan imposed military rule in Pakistan in 1958, some members of Awami League formed a separatist organization called "East Bengal Liberation Front" in Jamalpur, they asked Indian prime minister Jawaharlal Nehru for help in the war of independence, but he refused because of the Nehru–Liaquat Pact. Later, when the government arrested the leaders of the organization, it became inactive. In 1961, Sheikh Mujibur Rahman called upon the leaders of the East Pakistan Communist Party to jointly agitate with the Awami League for the independence of East Pakistan. When a group of Communist Party leaders led by Moni Singh sought permission from the Soviet Union to join the freedom movement, the party was reluctant to join as they did not receive a positive response. In 1962, a separatist organization called the "Provisional East Bengal Government" was formed which proposed the independence of East Pakistan. In 1963, Sheikh Mujibur Rahman wrote to prime minister Nehru to discuss the declaration of independence of East Pakistan and the formation of a government-in-exile in London. But Nehru did not want to talk to Mujib as the Sino-Indian war was going on. From 1963 to 1965, East Pakistan presented a case of economic deprivation with resources from the province benefitting West Pakistan at the cost of development in East Pakistan. Sheikh Mujibur Rahman, now leader of the Awami League, was arrested in 1966 and charged in the Agartala conspiracy case, which accused prominent East Pakistanis of trying to separate the country with help from India, in 1968. The 1969 East Pakistan mass uprising saw the charges in the Agartala conspiracy case being dropped. In a party meeting on 5 December 1969, Sheikh Mujibur Rahman proposed to name East Pakistan "Bangladesh" if it became independent. Sarbadalia Chhatra Sangram Parishad was created to press the government of Pakistan for the independence of East Pakistan. Sheikh Mujibur Rahman is released from prison on 22 February 1970 by President Ayub Khan. On 10 March 1970, Sheikh Mujibur Rahman demanded autonomy for East Pakistan based on the Six Point program of the Awami League. Moulana Abdul Hamid Khan Bhashani ends a public event with the slogan East Pakistan Zindabad on 23 November. 1970 Bhola cyclone killed 300 to 500 thousand people in East Pakistan. The people of East Pakistan found relief efforts by Pakistan government inadequate and felt neglected.

Flag of the Bangladeshi Independence movement

Awami League, led by Sheikh Mujibur Rahman, won 288 seats out of 300 seats in the provincial assembly. It won 167 of 300 seats in the National Assembly of Pakistan. Despite the overwhelming victory, the Awami League was not allowed to form a government by the military administration of Pakistan led by General Yahya Khan. On 7 March 1971, Sheikh Mujibur Rahman gave a historic speech to resist the West Pakistan administration, through refusing to follow their orders and paying taxes. The crowd at the event chanted Jai Bangla (victory to Bengal). On 19 March, soldiers of Pakistan Army from East Pakistan and West Pakistan had a small skirmish at the Gazipur Ordnance Factory after the East Bengal Regiment refused to fire at crowds of protesting Bengalis. On 24 March, soldiers of East Pakistan Rifles raised the flag of independent Bangladesh in Jessore District.

=== Proclamation ===
On 26 March 1971, Pakistan launched a crackdown on East Pakistan called Operation Searchlight and declared martial law, which was heard by only a limited number of people due to the broadcasting system used. Sheikh Mujibur Rahman was detained by Pakistan Army soon after. On the same day, through the radio station in Kalurghat, M. A. Hannan of the AL and Abul Kashem Sandwip, the initiator of the Swadhin Bangla Betar Kendra, broadcast the Proclamation of Bangladeshi Independence on behalf of Shekh Mujibur Rahman. On 27 March, Major Ziaur Rahman, officer of the East Bengal Regiment, proclaimed the independence of Bangladesh from Swadhin Bangla Betar Kendra. However, he later revised the proclamation under pressure on 30 March, announcing it in the name of Mujib. On 10 April, Bengals members of provincial and national assembly gathered in Kolkata and created a government in exile. It created the Proclamation of Independence based on 26 March's proclamation which was read from Baidyanathtala in Meherpur District.

==== Recognition ====
Bhutan recognized Bangladesh on 6 December and was followed by India a few hours later on the same day. They were the first two countries to recognize independent Bangladesh. East Germany recognized Bangladesh on 11 January 1972, becoming the third country to do so. On 7 February, Israel recognized Bangladesh following a request by the foreign minister of Bangladesh, Mostaq Ahmad.

=== Independence Day ===
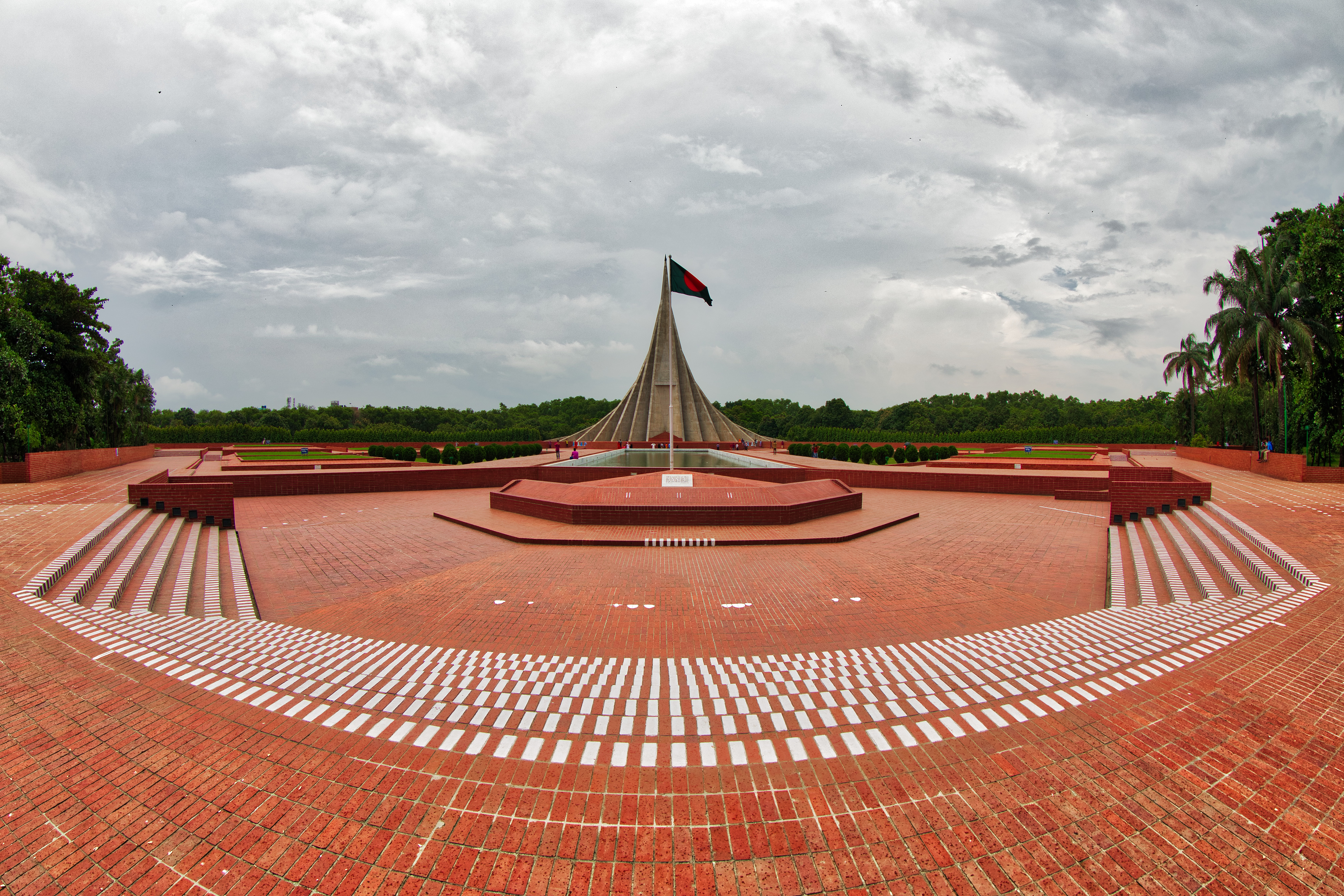
The national monument to the Liberation War.

The Independence Day of Bangladesh is celebrated on 26 March, the day Sheikh Mujibur Rahman declared the Independence of Bangladesh. Various programs are organised in the country to mark the occasion. The National Flag of Bangladesh is flown on all government buildings. The Independence Day Award was introduced by the Government of Bangladesh in 1977. The award is given on the Independence Day of Bangladesh on 26 March. The first Independence Day was celebrated on 26 March 1972, in which Prime Minister Sheikh Mujibur Rahman addressed the nation through a broadcast of the government reforms planned, such as the improvement in social rights.

== Liberation War ==
The launch of Operation Searchlight and declaration of Independence marked the start of Bangladesh Liberation War on 26 March 1971. The war lasted nine months and ended on 16 December 1971. The Pakistan Army targeted religious minorities and political supporters of the Independence of Bangladesh. The actions culminated in what is known as the Bangladesh Genocide. During the war, 15 million refugees from East Pakistan moved to India.

=== Casualties ===
- 300 thousands to 3 millions Bangladeshi were killed by Pakistani Army.
- two hundred thousand women were raped and tortured by the Pakistani Military in their base camps.

=== Victory day ===
Victory Day is on 16 December and it commemorates the surrender of Pakistan to Bangladesh India joint forces at the end of Bangladesh Liberation War. It is celebrated as Vijay Diwas in India.

== Causes ==
=== Cable 1971 ===
Cable 1971, otherwise known as Priority Signal or File 1971 was a high profile and secret military signal communicated in December 1952 between the two main inter-services branches of Pakistan–the Pakistan Army and the Pakistan Navy. It is notable for the fact that it essentially predicted the separation of Pakistan and Bangladesh and by coincidence its title contained the year in which the separation actually happened, almost 20 years later.

The cable discussed the implication of One Unit and one culture policy, religious fanaticism, and the economic parity between the West and East Pakistan that will ultimately result in the division of Pakistan into two different groups.

The cable's message read as:

- The creation of Committee of Ulema to veto the decisions taken in the House of People on religious matters, gives excess of powers to Ulema over the rights of elected representatives of the people. This gives an impression of Pakistan as being a theocratic state.
- To recommend that the head of the state should be a Muslim will unnecessarily create suspicions in minds of the minorities in Pakistan. The choice to select the head of the state should be left entirely to the people, to select without prejudice to caste, colour and creed.
- It is maintained by same officers that a single House elected on population basis should have been envisaged, and we should cease to think in terms of Bengalis, Pathans, Balochis, Sindhis, Punjabis etc. The parity between West & East Pakistan will ultimately result in the division of Pakistan into two different groups, therefore, it is the very negation of one people, one country and one culture.

The cable is notable for its highlighted title and many historians found strange that the cable was coincidentally numbered: Cable/File 1971.

=== Bengali language as national identity ===
Language played a key role in the independence movement of Bangladesh and became a key feature in nation-building after the Liberation War against Pakistan. Since the foundation and independence of Pakistan in 1947, language was a key dividing issue in the newly established state. The new Pakistani elite faced a difficult task of uniting all its citizens into a united Pakistani nation, and one immediate question that arose with the new state was about the language that would be used to conduct Pakistan's state business. The Pakistan Educational Conference of November 1947 proposed Urdu as the national language even though it was spoken by only 3% of Pakistanis, compared to 56% who spoke Bengali. The first population census revealed that Pakistan had 78 million inhabitants, of whom 44 million (55%) lived in East Pakistan. However, the country's rulers were concentrated in West Pakistan and used Islam to dismiss Bengali's protests as un-Islamic or anti-Islamic. Students in East Pakistan held meetings and demonstrations and formed the Language Action Committee in December 1947 when they learned about the plans to make Urdu the national language.

The Bengali language movement, was started by students at schools, colleges and universities. The success of this movement forced Pakistan to change its policies and fueled the emergence of Bengali ethno-nationalism, which led to the creation of Bangladesh as an independent state and the breakup of Pakistan in 1971. When the movement began to challenge West Pakistani domination in East Pakistan, the citizens and the press in West Pakistan thought that it was orchestrated by Hindus, communists and anti-state elements trying to destabilize the state. Thousands of young Bengali boys and girls from schools and universities in Dhaka assembled on the campus of Dhaka University marching and shouting slogans like "Bengali as a national language!" (rastrabhdsa bamla cai!). As soon as the students passed the campus gates, armed policemen baton-charged them; the students retaliated by throwing bricks before policemen fired tear gas into the crowd as a response. Many were injured while five people died; demonstrations, killings, and arrests would continue for a few more days. A memorial was then erected on the spot where the first killings had taken place. A 1984 textbook introduces the language movement with the following, "February 21 of 1952 was the first united expression of Bangladesh's collective consciousness and a first bold step toward the independence movement". The language movement became a symbol for Bengali nationalism; the claim by Bengali textbooks is that 'Bengali' became the primary marker of Bangladesh's identity.

Sufia Kamal, a Bangladeshi poet, wrote the poem "Our Language: The Language of Bengal" in 1952, during the time of the language movement; the poem shows how strongly language played a role in the national identity of the new state.

For our language many have died,

drawn from the arms of our mother

but down the road, smeared with their blood

I hope freedom will come to this land:

the simple language of a simple people

Will meet the demands of this our land.

— Sufia Kamal

The independence of Bangladesh in December 1971 regarded the national identity as a regional one, rather than a religious one like Pakistan's foundation. The new Bengali elite envisioned the society that was taking place in the delta as distinctly Bengali, where Bangladesh stood as a nation-state, a homeland to the Bengali community that had been unjustly treated in Pakistan. The main pillars of the new nation were language, a regional style, and a search for modernity.

The Bangla Academy was an institution established in the 1950s as a result of the language movement; after independence, it became a major publisher of textbooks, dictionaries, folk literature, etc. The written and the spoken language were two distinct languages, whose differences were greater than that of other languages. The language of books was distinct, and without a trace of the popular, based on Sanskrit. This fact took a turn with Tekchand Thakur's "Alarer Ghorer Dulal", which was written in the language that everyone understood. From that moment on, books began to be written in the learned and popular languages in Bangladesh.

== Controversy ==
There is some dispute between the Awami League and the Bangladesh Nationalist party, founded by Ziaur Rahman, on who declared the Independence of Bangladesh. When a different party comes to power, they change the history books of Bangladesh to either prefer Sheikh Mujibur Rahman or Ziaur Rahman.
