= Belal Muhammad (activist) =

Bangladeshi independence activist (1936–2013)

- বেলাল মোহাম্মদ
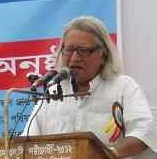
- Belal Muhammad at a conference in Sandwip, Chittagong.
- Born: 20 February 1936; Musapur, Sandwip, Chittagong, Bangladesh
- Died: 30 July 2013 (aged 77); Dhaka, Bangladesh
- Notable work: Founder of Swadhin Bangla Betar Kendra in 1971.
- Movement: Liberation war of Bangladesh
- Parent(s): Mahmuda Khanom; Moulavi Muhammad Yaqub
- Awards: Independence Day Award (2010); Bangla Academy Literary Award (2011)

Belal Mohammad (20 February 1936 – 30 July 2013) was one of the founders of the Swadhin Bangla Betar Kendra.

== Early life ==
Muhammad was born at Musapur Union in Sandwip, Chittagong. His mother was Mahmuda Khanom and father was Moulavi Muhammad Yaqub. He was an active member of Student Union of Chittagong committee in his student life. He started working as the sub-editor of Dainik Azadi in 1964 and also joined in Radio Pakistan in that year. Muhammad's wife died in 1973 and only son, Ananda, died in 1998 at the age of 32.

== Liberation war in 1971 ==
On 7 March 1971, when the non-cooperation movement began with the speech from Sheikh Mujibur Rahman, Mohammad was then a government officer and worked as a scriptwriter and artiste for the Radio Pakistan. He believed that the radio was a strong backbone for a nation. That is when the idea of Swadhin Bangla Betar Kendra came to his head. Since he was a radio officer, he had some experience on the subject. In those days, the Chittagong Radio station had a 10 KW transmitter, which had a radius of 50 miles listening area. Belal, along with two of his friends and co-organizers, Abdullah-Al-Faruque, Abul Kashem Sandwip, and two other unwilling engineers, who they somehow managed to convince, set out for the transmitter station at Kalurghat and founded Swadhin Bangla Betar Kendra. He was the arranger and organizer of the declaration of Independence of Bangladesh from Kalurghat betar kendra after Sheikh Mujibur Rahman had declared it and announced by Major Ziaur Rahman on behalf of Sheikh Mujib on March 27, 1971. Belal was appointed as the assistant director of the radio station on June 1, 1971.

== Awards ==
Mohammad was awarded Independence Day Award in 2010 for his contributions to the independence and Bangladesh Liberation War. He also received Bangla Academy Literary Award for literature on liberation war affairs in 2011.

== Death ==
Mohammad died on July 30, 2013, at the age of 77 at the Intensive Care Unit in Apollo Hospital Dhaka. He donated his body which was received by Sher-e-Bangla Medical College for the use of the medical students.
