= Wars and battles involving Pakistan =

Wars and battles involving Pakistan may refer to:

- List of wars involving Pakistan
- Military history of Pakistan
- Outline of Pakistan military history
- Pakistan and the War on Terror
