= Bulbul Mahalanobish =

Bangladeshi singer (1953–2023)

- বুলবুল মহলানবীশ
- Born: 10 March 1953; Munshiganj, East Bengal, Dominion of Pakistan
- Died: 14 July 2023 (aged 70); Dhaka, Bangladesh
- Education: University of Dhaka

Bulbul Mahalanobish (10 March 1953 – 14 July 2023) was a Bangladeshi Nazrul Geeti singer, poet, author, musician, and stage performer. She was a singer at Swadhin Bangla Betar Kendra, the radio broadcasting centre of Bengali nationalist forces during the Bangladesh Liberation War in 1971.

== Early life and career ==
Bulbul Mahalanobish was born in Bikrampur on 10 March 1953. She graduated from the University of Dhaka.

Beside her songs, Mahalanobish also played the lead female character, the role of Yahya Khan' s wife, at Jallader Darbar, a radio play written by Kalyan Mitra for Swadhin Bangla Betar Kendra. On 16 December 1971, the victory day of Bangladesh, Mahalanobish sang the song "Bijoy Nishan Urchhe Oi" on the radio station.

Mahalanobish published two studio albums and authored 12 books during her career. She served as the vice president of Nazrul Sangeet Shilpi Parishad and general secretary of Rabindra Academy. She also served as the finance secretary of Jatiya Kabita Parishad, member of Member of Bangladesh Rabindra Sangeet Shilpi Sangshad, Kochikachar Mela, Bangladesh Udichi Shilpigoshthi, Sector Commanders' Forum, Swadhin Bangla Betar Kendra Shilpi Parishad and publication secretary of Bangladesh-India Friendship Society.

Mahalanobish died at her residence in Gulshan neighborhood in Dhaka on 14 July 2023, at the age of 70. Her funeral was held at Borderswari Kalimata Temple in Sabujbagh. Prime Minister of Bangladesh, Sheikh Hasina, mourned her death, saying "Bulbul Mahalanobis was simultaneously a poet, author, singer, recitalist, actor and presenter of art-literary-cultural programmes at the television and radio. She was one of the important personalities in the cultural arena."

Mahalanobish's niece Joita Mahalanobish is an actress.

== Awards ==
- Chayan Gold Medal
- Dewan Azraf Foundation Award
- Nazrul Academy Award from West Bengal
- Ambassador's Award for playing an integral role in the cultural practice of Bangladeshis in the United Arab Emirates.
