= Operation Hotel Intercontinental =

1971 Bangladesh Liberation War engagement in Ramna, Dhaka

- Part of Bangladesh Liberation War
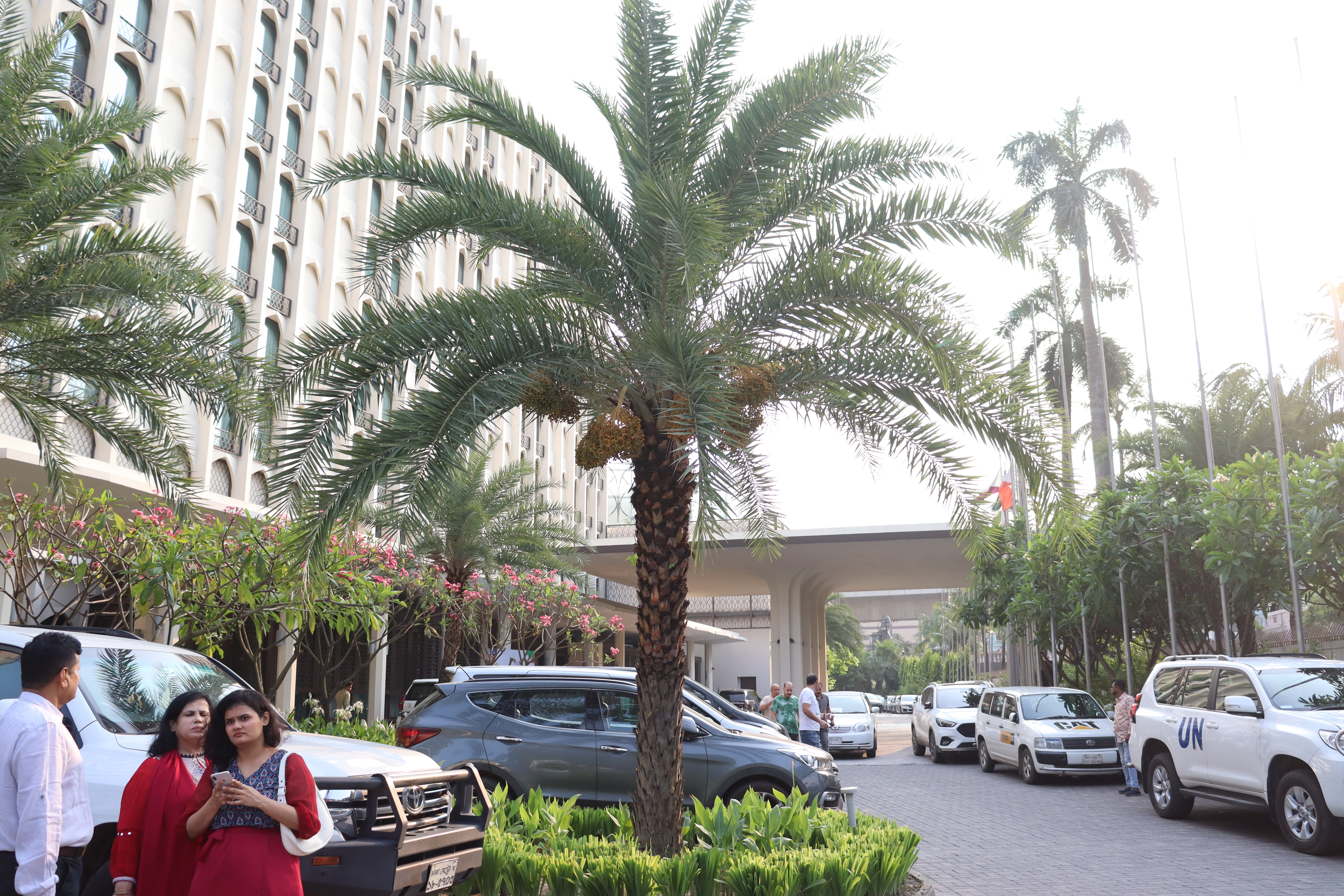
- Attackers threw grenades at a car under the portico of the Minto Rd. entrance to the Hotel Intercontinental.
Location	Dhaka, East Pakistan 23.7415°N 90.3970°E

Belligerents
Bangladesh	Pakistan

Commanders and leaders
Khaled Mosharraf ATM Haider	Lt. Gen. A. A. K. Niazi

Strength
Mukti Bahini; Commandos of Crack Platoon	Pakistan Army: 14th Infantry Division; 9th Infantry Division; 16th Infantry Division; 39th Ad hoc Infantry Division; 36th Ad Hoc Infantry Division; 97th Independent Infantry Brigade; 40th Army Logistic Brigade; 4th Army Aviation Squadron; Special Service Group; Pakistan Navy; Pakistan Marine Corps; Pakistan Air Force Paramilitary Forces: East Pakistan Civil Armed Force HQ wings

Operation Hotel Intercontinental was an attack on the Hotel Intercontinental on 9 June 1971, in Dhaka, then part of East Pakistan, in the Bangladesh Liberation War. The attack was carried out by members of the commando unit of Mukti Bahini.

== Formation and deployment of Crack Platoon ==
In June 1971, the World Bank sent a mission to observe the situation in East Pakistan. The media cell of Pakistan government maintained that the situation in East Pakistan was stable. Major Khaled Mosharraf, a sector commander of Mukti Bahini, planned to deploy a special commando team. The task assigned to the team was to carry out commando operations and to terrorise Dhaka. The main objective of this team was to prove that the situation was not stable. Moreover, Pakistan at that time was expecting economic aid. The plan was to stop the World Bank mission, and to make the UNHCR understand the true situation of East Pakistan, and therefore not provide financial aid. Khaled, along with Major ATM Haider (a former SSG Commando), another sector commander, formed the Crack Platoon, initially of 17 members. They received commando training in Melaghar Camp. From Melaghar, commandos of the Crack Platoon headed for Dhaka on 4 June 1971 and launched the guerrilla operation on 5 June. Later, the number of commandos was increased, and the platoon was split and deployed in different areas surrounding Dhaka city.

== Operation Hotel Intercontinental ==
On 9 June 1971, the guerrillas launched the first attack in central Dhaka, at the Hotel Intercontinental. They stopped in a car in front of the hotel, armed with hand grenades, bayonets, and a pistol. They threw five grenades in the attack. The operation was reported by the BBC News.
