= Ishtiaq Aziz Ulfat =

Bangladeshi freedom fighter and political organiser

- ইশতিয়াক আজিজ উলফাত
- Known for: Dhaka-based urban guerrilla activities during the Bangladesh Liberation War; Jatiyatabadi Muktijoddha Dal
- Political party: Bangladesh Nationalist Party

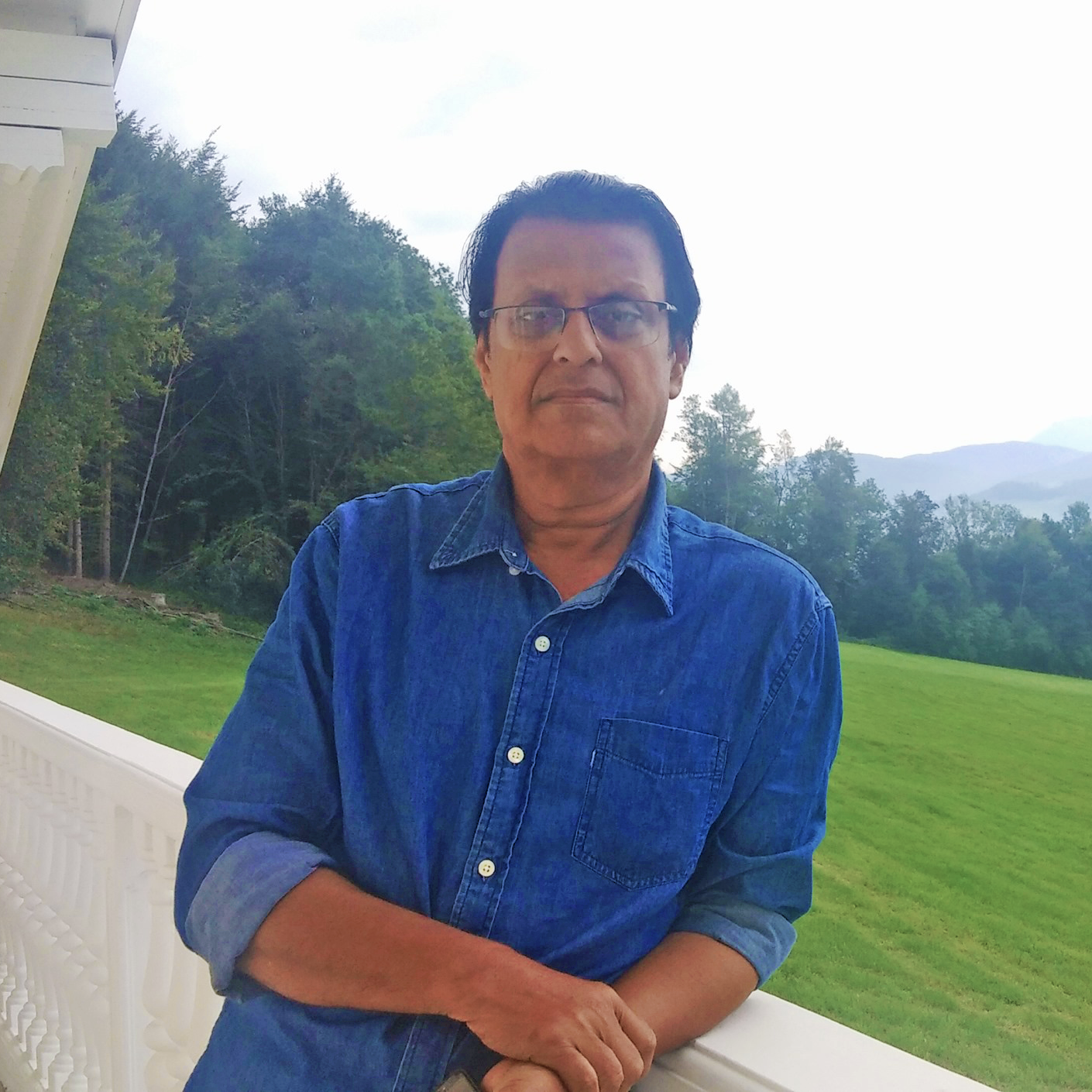
Freedom Fighter Ishtiaq Aziz Ulfat

Ishtiaq Aziz Ulfat (Bengali: ইশতিয়াক আজিজ উলফাত) is recognized as a Bangladeshi freedom fighter and political organiser. During the Bangladesh Liberation War, Ulfat participated in urban guerrilla operations and served in the unit popularly known as the Crack Platoon. This group operated under the leadership of Major Haider and the coordinator, Shahidullah Khan Badol, with strategic direction from Sector Commander Khaled Musharraf.

He currently serves as the president of the Jatiyatabadi Muktijoddha Dal, a wing of the Bangladesh Nationalist Party (BNP).

== Early life and family ==
Ulfat has frequently described the impact of the Liberation War on his family, particularly the death of his elder brother, Abu Mayeen Ashfakus Samad, during the conflict. Ashfakus Samad, recognized as a martyr of the War of Liberation, was posthumously awarded the Bir Uttam gallantry award.

== Bangladesh Liberation War ==
At the beginning of the war, Ulfat, like many other freedom fighters, traveled to India for military training. Upon returning to Dhaka, he engaged in urban guerrilla operations in 1971, which included acts of sabotage and clandestine activities intended to demonstrate resistance within the capital.

== Political Activities ==
Ulfat became disillusioned with the former autocratic government, and in recent decades, joined the opposition Bangladesh Nationalist Party (BNP). He has since served as president of the Jatiyatabadi Muktijoddha Dal.

Ulfat previously served as a member of the National Freedom Fighters Council, also known as the Jatiya Muktijoddha Council or Jamuka. Later he was released from that position after publicly expressing his views, which stemmed from disagreements over the council's performance and its procedures for verifying and certifying freedom fighters.

== Public Activities ==
Ulfat has worked closely with Dr. Zafarullah Chowdhury, founder and trustee of Gonoshasthaya Kendra, and has frequently solicited and distributed donations to support disadvantaged communities.

== See also ==
- Crack Platoon
- Bangladesh Nationalist Party
- Bangladesh Jatiotabadi Muktijoddha Dal
- Abu Mayeen Ashfakus Samad
