= InterContinental Dhaka =

Coordinates: 23.7410°N 90.3965°E

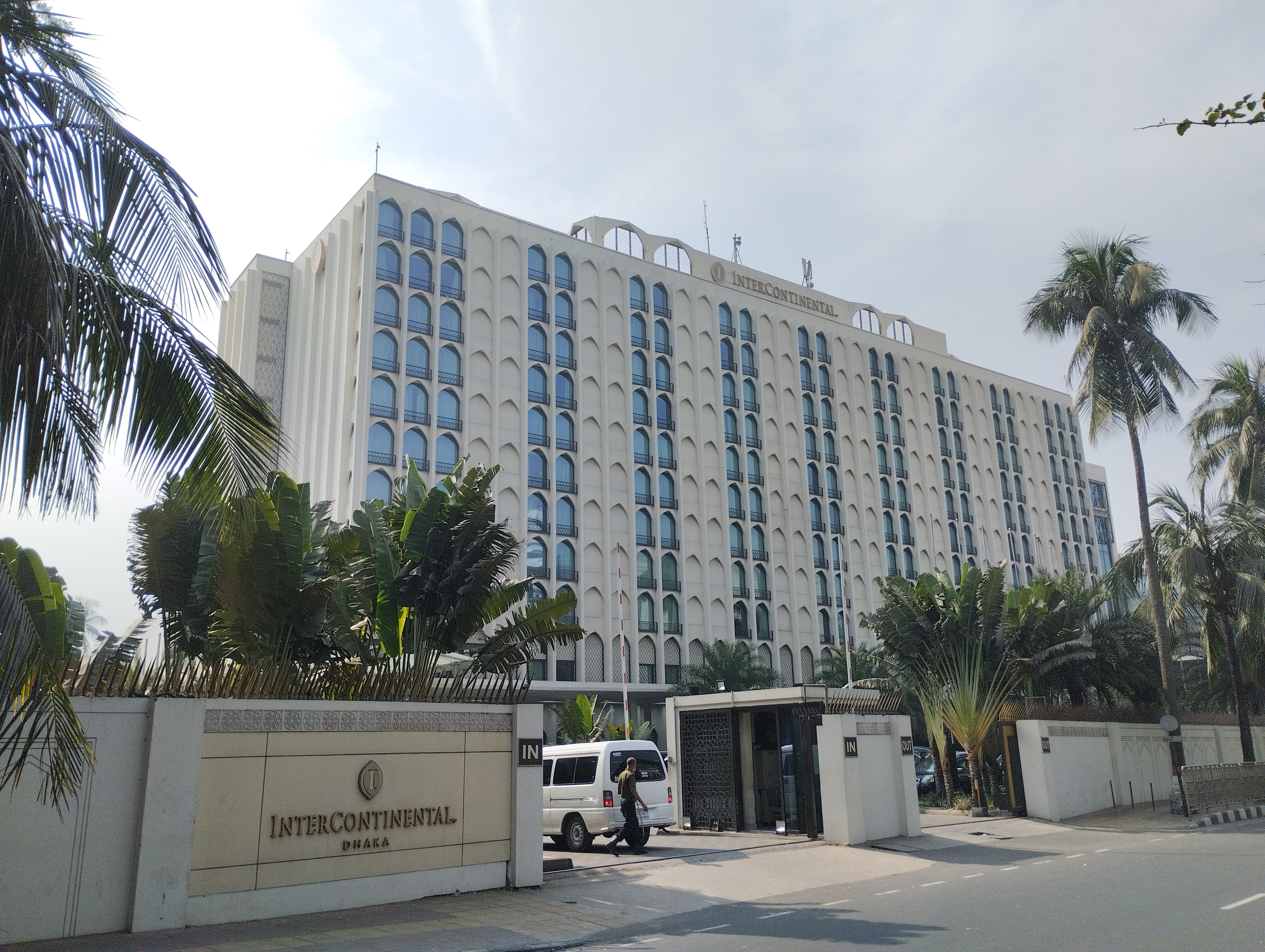

- Location within Bangladesh
- Former names: Hotel Inter-Continental Dacca; Sheraton Dhaka Hotel; Ruposhi Bangla Hotel

General information
- Type: Hotel
- Location: 1 Minto Road, Ramna, Dhaka, Bangladesh
- Opening: 1966
- Owner: Bangladesh Services Limited
- Operator: InterContinental Hotels

Other information
- Public transit: MRT Line 6 Shahbagh

The InterContinental Dhaka is a prominent luxury hotel in Ramna in central Dhaka, the capital of Bangladesh. It was opened in 1966.

== Location ==
The vicinity of the hotel includes the Shahbag roundabout, the Suhrawardy Udyan, Ramna Park, the Dhaka Club, the University of Dhaka, BSMMU, BIRDEM Hospital, the Bangladesh National Museum and official state guest houses.

== History ==
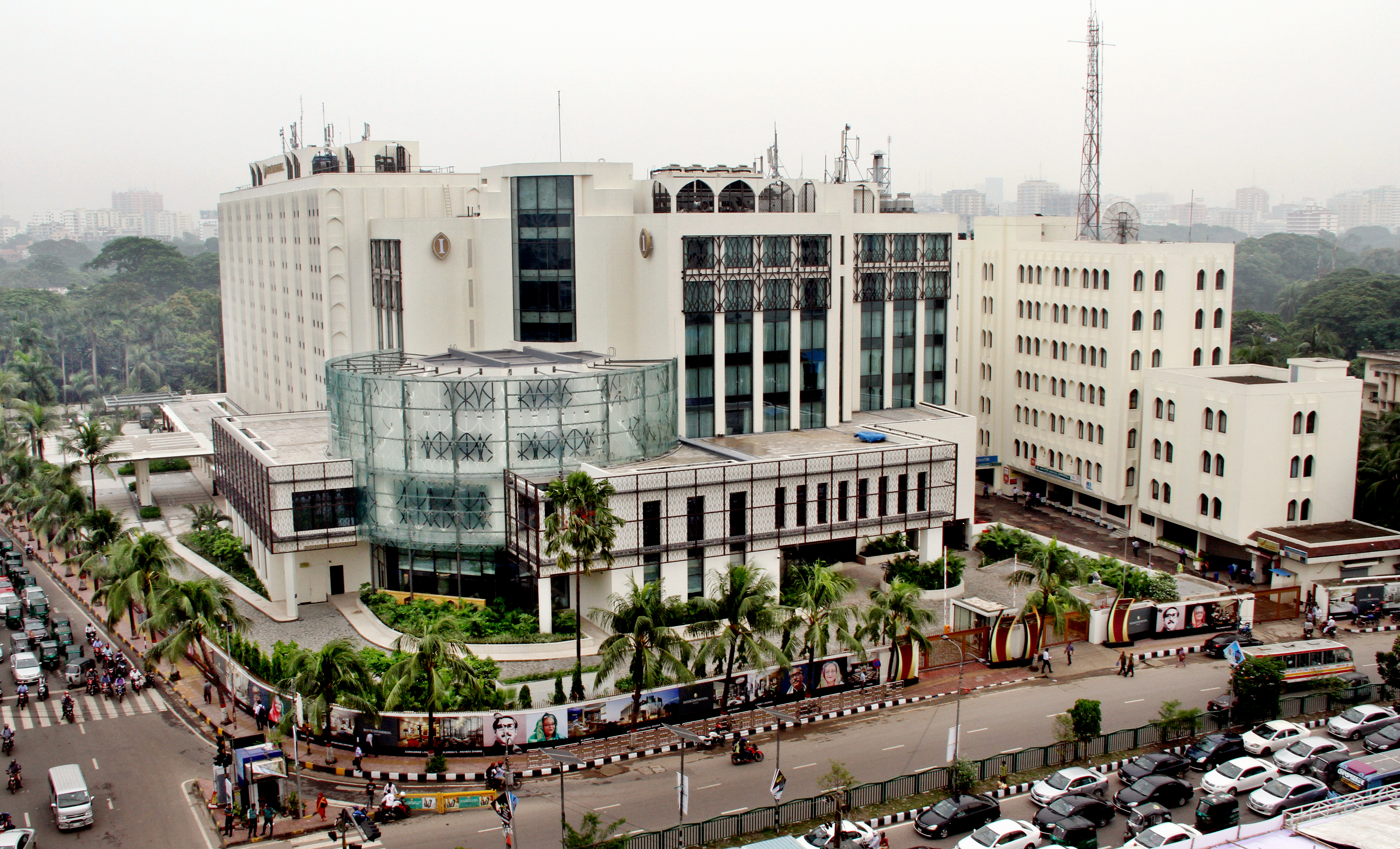
The hotel after renovations, 2018

The Inter-Continental Dacca opened in 1966, when the city, then known as Dacca, was the capital of East Pakistan. The hotel was the first international five-star hotel in what would soon become the nation of Bangladesh. It was designed by architect William B. Tabler.

The hotel played host to many important political events in the run up to the independence of Bangladesh, including negotiations on the transfer of power after the 1970 elections. During the Bangladesh Liberation War in 1971, it was declared a neutral zone by the International Red Cross. Many buildings in its surrounding neighborhoods were targeted by the Pakistani military, including newspaper offices and university halls. It was attacked during Operation Hotel Intercontinental which caused deaths of many Pakistani soldiers.

InterContinental Hotels operated the hotel until 1983, when it was taken over by Sheraton, becoming the Sheraton Dhaka Hotel. In 2011, Sheraton announced that it would end its contract with the Bangladeshi government to manage the hotel, which was renamed the Ruposhi Bangla Hotel. In 2013, it was announced that InterContinental Hotels would re-assume management of the state-owned property, following a major renovation. The hotel closed on September 1, 2014, and reopened as the InterContinental Dhaka on December 19, 2018.
