= M. R. Akhtar Mukul =

- এম. আর. আখতার মুকুল
- Born: 1929; Bogura
- Died: 26 June 2004 (aged 74–75)
- Occupations: Writer, journalist

M. R. Akhtar Mukul (1929–2004) was a Bengali writer and journalist from Bangladesh; earned fame for Chorompotro, a radio program from Shwadhin Bangla Betar Kendra.

== Chorompotro ==
Mukul started the program from the clandestine Shwadhin Bangla Betar Kendra, the radio station run by the Bangladesh Government in Exile in India during the liberation war in 1971 (25 March-16 December) against Pakistani armed forces.

Chorompotro, meaning 'the ultimate mail' or an 'ultimatum,' was the radio program. Between 25 May and 16 December 1971, Mukul broadcast the feature in 117 episodes in 206 days. In Chorompotro, Mukul used a dramatically funny voice and caricatured the positions of the military, President of Pakistan Yahya Khan, the members of his government, his civilian allies like Zulfiqar Ali Bhutto, his governors in occupied Bangladesh, army generals, and soldiers, as well as Pakistan's international allies including the US and China. His language was full of verbal insults. In his offensive language, he used various Bengali dialects of Bangladesh as well as songs and proverbs, folk stories, and jokes, and the program found popularity amongst all Bengalis, including the freedom fighters the Bengali refugees in India, as well as the general population in both occupied Bangladesh and West Bengal in India. The broadcasts remained anonymous until the final episode and the final words, when he disclosed his name.

Chorompotro turned out not to be popular with the authorities in Bangladesh after the liberation and its tapes and scripts stored in the vault of the state radio station were burnt after a change of government in 1975. It was only in 2000 that Chorompotro was printed and published as a collection by Mukul himself.

Between 1960 and 2000, Mukul authored thirty more books on subjects like the liberation war and the Bengali language movement of 1952.

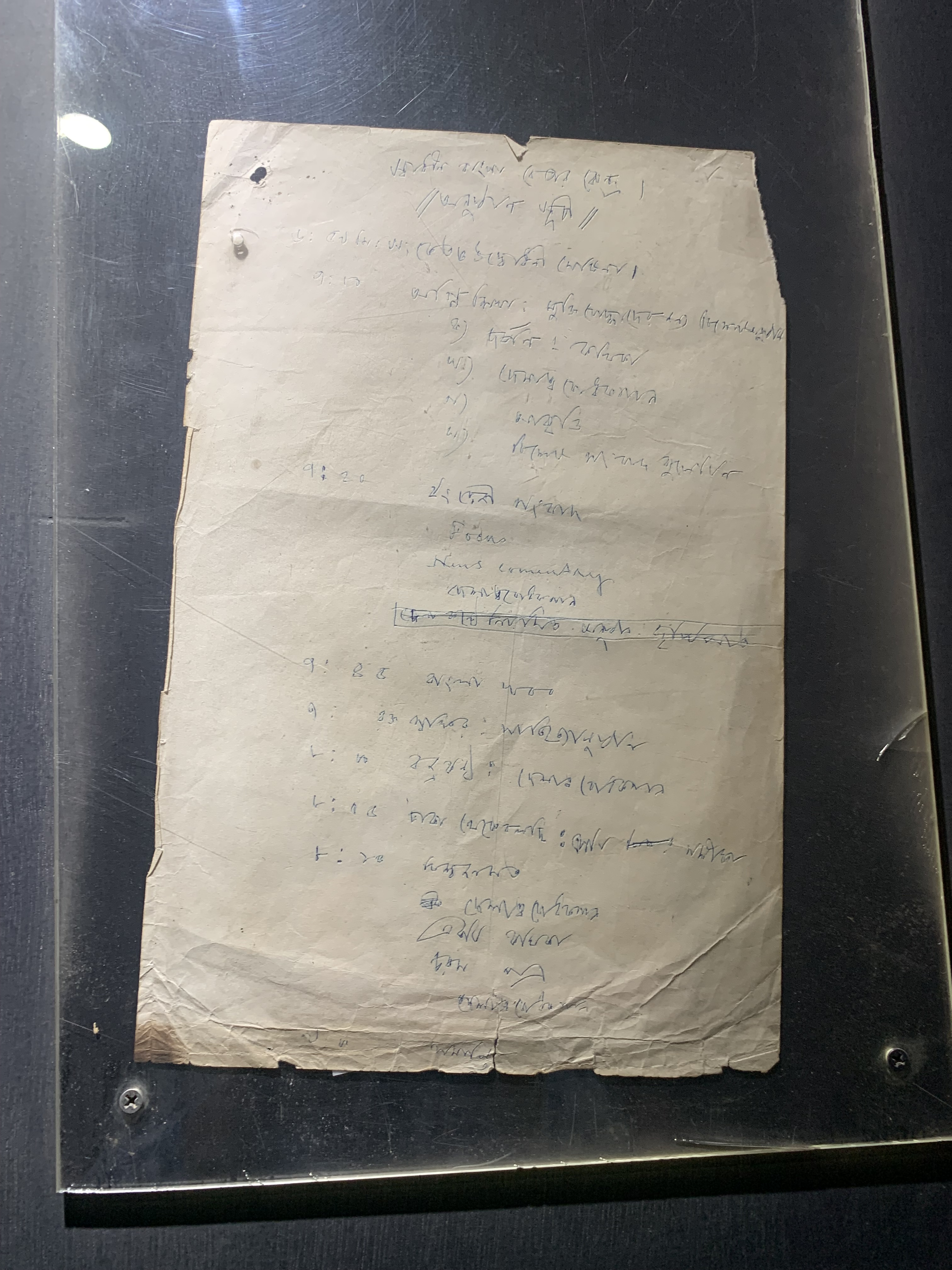
Programme Schedule of Swadhin Bangla Betar Kendro, with Chorompotro included in the day

Mukul in his youth was involved with the leftist political movement and later aligned himself with the Bengali nationalist movement led by Sheikh Mujibur Rahman. He was later a career journalist and worked as a local reporter for the news agency UPI. After independence, he became the head of the Bangladesh Radio and moved to a diplomatic career. Following the massacre of President Sheikh Mujib and his family in Dhaka, he lost the job at the Bangladesh High Commission in London and spent years in self-imposed exile in England. In order to survive with his family, he took a laboring job in the garment industry in East London. After his eventual return to Bangladesh and a brief government job, he opened a bookshop named Sagar Publishers in Bailey Road in Dhaka and concentrated in writing and publishing his books.

== Death ==
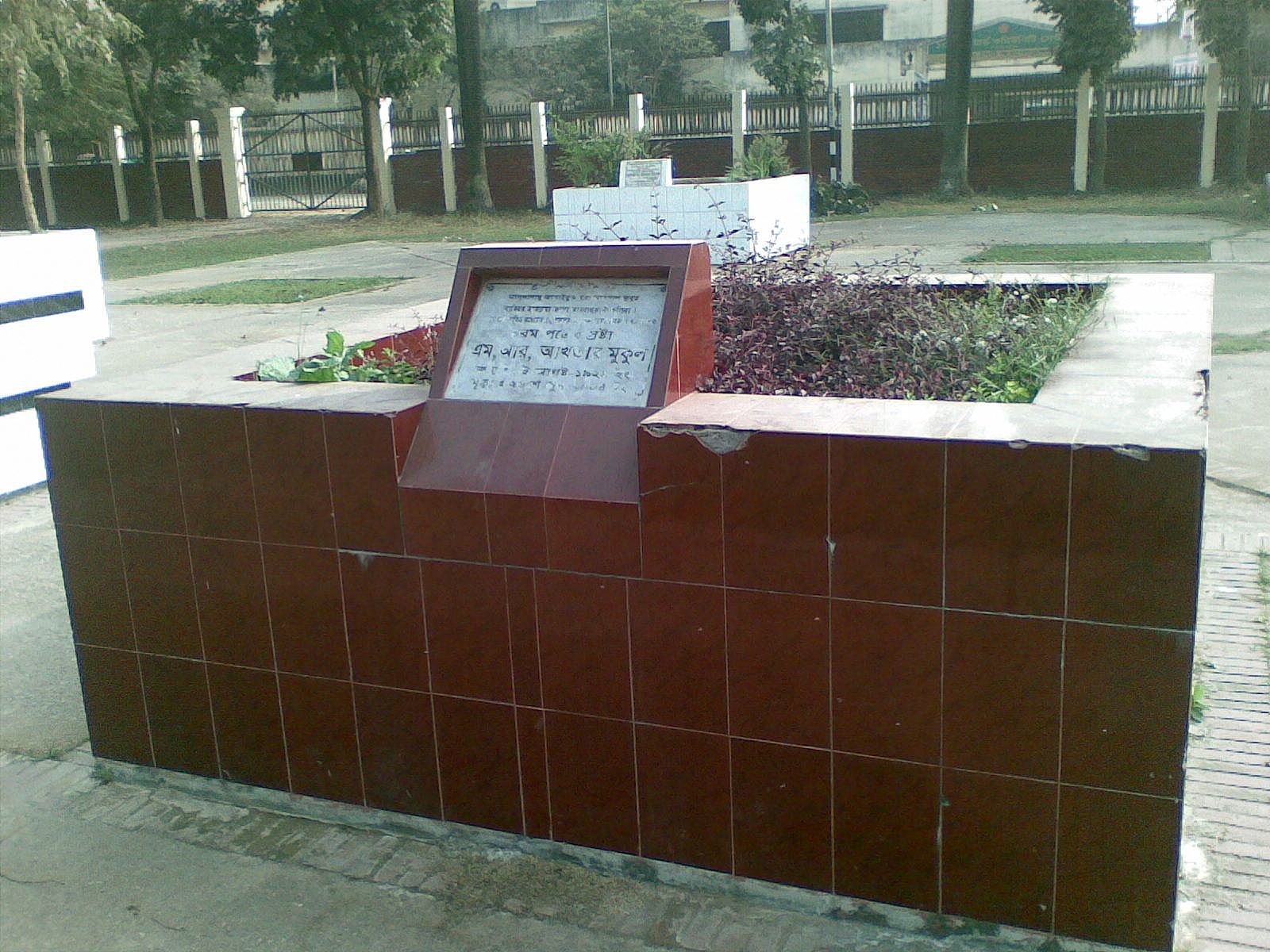
Grave of Mukul in Martyred Intellectuals Graveyard, Mirpur

Mukul died in Dhaka on 26 June 2004.

== Books on 1971 ==
- Ekatturer Bornomala
- Ora Charjon
- Joybangla
- Bijoy Ekattur
- Ami Bijoy Dekhechi
- Mohapurush
- Dhaka Theke Sedney
- Kolkata kendrik buddhijibi
- Prothom sorkarer itikotha
