= Kokari-Sharshari =

1980s supply depot in Afghanistan

- Herat Province, Afghanistan

Site information
- Type: Fortified Supply Base

Location
- Location within Afghanistan
- Coordinates: 35.344°N 61.189°E

Site history
- Built: 1984
- In use: 1984–1990
- Materials: Concrete, stone
- Battles/wars: Operation Trap (1986)

Garrison information
- Garrison: Forces of Ismail Khan

Kokari-Sharshari or Kakari and Sharshari was a fortified supply depot in western Afghanistan, operated by mujaheddin as a logistic base in the 1980s during the Soviet invasion and at least up to 1990.

"Kokari-Sharshari" (Pashto شرشر) — fortified areas of afghan mujahideen (1979-1989) fortification of afghan mujahedin during the Soviet-Afghan war (1979-1989). Fortified area, base area, fortification structure, strongpoint transshipment base "of the" Western united group of afghan mujahideen of field commander Ismail Khan, in mountain range Kukhe-Senge-Surakh (White Mountains) in the zone of the Afghan-Iranian border, Herat province.

== History of creation ==
The base area was a transshipment and support point, at the same time - a strategic body in the logistics support system for Afghan mujahedin in the area bordering Iran in western Afghanistan under the command of the "Western united group" of Mujahideen, Ismail Khan. The base area of Kokari-Sharshari is Kokari-Shershari, Kakari-Shashari, Kakari-Shushari, Sharshar, Sher Sher, a fortified complex of protective structures and fortifications with powerful defensive communications organized according to a single plan for control of the fire system was called upon to conduct sustained combat operations in a sustained defense on a broad front in complete isolation and with relatively small forces and means to inflict maximum damage on the superior - besieging and assaulting forces of the Soviet at ojsk, using heavy artillery and assault aviation.

It is located on the mountainous section of the Afghan-Iranian border in the province of Herat - the west of the Republic of Afghanistan. "Kokari-Sharshari" - the second after Javar, from the three largest border the fortifications of Afghan mujahideen (1979-1989)) of the base areas of Afghan mujahedeen during the Afghan war (1979-1989), along with Javara and Tora Bora.

== Tactico-geographical potential ==
Tactico-geographical advantages are due to the proximity of the border of a foreign state - not a controlled territory, with which military, political, food aid and the replenishment of the Kokari units by live force were continuously provided. The maximum territorial proximity of military training camps for the training of military specialists in adjacent Iran to the "Kokari-Sharshari", a unified system of underground communications, provided systematic strengthening of the "Kokari" garrison by fresh forces and means, including special military training and motivated by radical Islamic ideology by the Mujahideen and numerous foreign mercenaries of a number of Islamic states.

The first clashes around the base between Soviet-Kabul forces and Mujaheddin were reported in June 1986; it was just a small part of an extensive Soviet campaign to cut off the rebel supply routes. During the fighting eleven people were killed by 19 June.

The rebel activity around this site was a primary motive for the Soviets to mount a massive military assault in August 1986, which later became known as operation Trap. The eventual purpose was to break the rebel logistic chain in Herat Province. It turned out later that the success of the operation was neither final nor decisive, as in September 1986 the Soviet Union's official information agency TASS reported an accomplishment of another operation against "counterrevolutionary gangs in Herat Province". According to the report, Kabul forces located a great number of weapon- and ammunition stashes which were destroyed without casualties.

According to the memoirs of General A.A. Lyakhovsky: "During the Afghan War (1979-1989), the armed opposition formations in the border areas were equipped with large trans-shipment bases: Marulgad, Rabati-Jali, Shinarai, KOKARI-SHARSHARI, Javara, Lmarchhouse, Angurkot, Khodjamulk, Mianpushta, Anandara, Chagali, Tangiseidan, they were also the base areas at the same time ... "- General AA. Lyakhovsky "Tragedy and valor of Afghanistan".

The fortified base Kokari-Sharshari was built in 1984. It was situated on the Kuh-e Sang Surakh Mountain massif in the Safid Kuh Mountains of the Paropamisus Mountain Chain, just across the border with Iran. The carefully chosen location was about 70-80 kilometers north of a road connecting Herat to the Iranian frontier, about 30 kilometers south of the intersection of the borders of Afghanistan, Iran and Soviet Turkmenistan. The highest point of the site was approximately 1,061 meters, which is 511 meters higher than the north-flowing Harrirud River that wrapped around the western and northern edge of the depot.

== Organization and features ==
As with a majority of Mujahideen supply and transfer bases, Kokari-Sharshari was built as a well-planned system incorporating ground and subterranean facilities. The base consisted of a command post, a communication center, training grounds, classrooms for ideological indoctrination, barracks, a hospital, a mosque, power generators, warehouses for repair and ammunition production, large-scale supply of firearms, water, provisions, and war materials. Some of the structures had been designed by engineers from Iran and West Germany.

The fortified perimeter of the base was made of three defensive lines with bunkers, weapon installations and strong points. All fighting positions were scattered at various heights to block different approach routes to the base. A protection from air attack was provided by MANPADS, ZU-23-2 twin-barreled automatic cannons, ZPU 14.5mm anti-aircraft systems and DShK heavy machineguns. Units with Chinese-made recoilless rifles and a wide array of mortars were responsible for direct and indirect artillery support. In addition to this there was a tunnel system 15–20 meters below the earth surface, which could be used for hidden maneuver and evacuation. Some of the tunnels allegedly led to Iran. The base garrison was manned by forces of prominent Afghan leader Ismail Khan.

== Operation Trap and Capture of Kokari-Sharshari ==
In the second half of 1986, the Soviet command agreed with M. Najibullah, the President of Afghanistan, to defeat the Kokari-Sharshari enemy base, which played the same role in the north-west of Afghanistan as the Javara in the east. According to the calculations of the Soviet command, the destruction of the base would significantly weaken the opposition's pressure on Herat and would reduce its activity in the western regions of the country.

With the aim of mastering the base area of Kokari-Sharshari and the defeat of Ismail Khan's Western United Group, on August 18–26, 1986, a combined-arms operation "Trap" was carried out by units, a combination of OKVA and government forces of the DRA. The head of the operational group of the USSR Defense Ministry in the Republic of Afghanistan and the head of the military operation "Trap" - Army General V.I. Varennikov included mastering the base area as one of the most important events during his participation in the Afghan war (1979-1989):

"During my stay in Afghanistan, a number of interesting and complex operations were carried out. Of course, the operation of the operation is different. Some left no memories. Others will never fade. For me, operations in the Kunar Gorge, during the storming of the Javar base, on the Parachinar ridge, in the Kunduz area, west of Herat to the base of the "Kokari-Sharshari" on the Iranian border, are particularly memorable" — General of the Army Varennikov VI "Unrepeatable"

Despite the fierce resistance on August 25, 1986, the Kokari group was defeated. Defenders who survived the defense, realizing the doomedness of the citadel, using the messages in the underground communications system, leaving defensive positions, with the commander of the Ismail-Khan formations retired to the territory of Iran.

== Soviet and Russian Literature ==
- Colonel-General V.M. Barynkin "Preparation and conduct of military operations in mountainous theater." - Moscow: Military Publishing, 1999. Scheme "The decision of the commander Colonel-General V.M. Barynkin "Preparation and conduct of military operations in mountainous theater." - M .: Military Publishing, 1999. Scheme - "The decision of the commander of the 40th Army to defeat the enemy's base area" Kokari-Sharshari "in 1986" (Kunduz.ru - Appendix 27
- Bogdanov V.A. — Lieutenant-General, Chief of the South Direction of the GSU GS book "The Afghan War (1979-1989): Memoirs" p. 142 - M .: AST, "Soviet writer. Moscow »2005 ISBN 5-265-06354-4
- Daudi I. Operation "The Trap". From the Chronicle of the Combat Route of the Soviet Troops in the Republic of Afghanistan (rus.) // Army Collection: Journal. - 2016. - August (No. 8). - P. 88–92. - ISSN 1560-036X.
- "Notes of the Military Attache: Iran, Egypt, Iran, Afghanistan" SP Krakhmalov
- "Limited contingent" Gromov BV - page 204
- "Secrets of the Afghan War" Lyakhovsky AA, Zabrodin V.М. - page 84
- "Afghanistan: the war of scouts" V. Markovsky, V. Milyachenko - page 71
- "Afghanistan: From the War of the 80s to the Forecast of New Wars", Gen. E.G. Nikitenko - Page 39
- "Recognition of the Mujahideen" A.Tamonikov
- "IN AND. Varennikov: Unrepeatable »Book.5
- "The Afghan war. Memoirs "pp. 140-142 The author of the book Lieutenant-General Bogdanov VA the head of the Southern direction of the General Staff of the General Staff of the USSR Ministry of Defense, the chief of staff of the Operational Group of the USSR Ministry of Defense in the DRA (1987-1988).
- "40 Army - a war in the mountains" Colonel-General V.M. Barynkin - head of the General Staff of the General Staff of the Ministry of Defense of the Russian Federation, Moscow - 2002, p. 77-85 Printing house of the Military High School of the Armed Forces of the Russian Federation.
- "Peculiarities of preparation and conduct of specific operations of the 40th Army" (from the experience of military operations in Afghanistan). Typography of the Armed Forces of the Russian Armed Forces, Colonel-General Barynkin VM, Doctor of Military Sciences, Professor. Monograph. Russian Aeronautical Society (Military Department) Moscow, 1999
- Combat Operations of the 40th Army
- "Tragedy and valor of Afgan" А.А. Lyakhovsky p. 114, 153 / Society. 345
- Journal "Army Collection" Extracts on the liquidation of the base (Kokari-Shushari) "Kokari-Sharshari", issues 1-6 p. 2005
- Military operation "Trap" in the province of Herat (Afghanistan) 19–25.08.1986 TV show "Military Secret" No. 173 TC "Ren TV" 02/18/2013
- "Our people in Afghanistan or how they took Stinger" (about the flight over the fortified area)
- "Wars and military conflicts (Afghanistan)" by Major-General E.G. Nikitenko Magazine "Military Space Defense"
- AFGHAN: The History of the War - 1986
- Operation "WEST" to destroy the base-arsenal of Turan Ismail "Kokari-Sharshari" on the Iranian border
- "Our people in Afghanistan or how" took "Stinger," AK. Schultz (intelligence post Herat)
- "Kokari-Sharshari" in the Iranian border Herat province "The American Association for the Promotion of Slavic Studies" 1986 - August 29, 1986 p. 98, 99 Volume 38, Issues 27-52
- "Su-25 'Frogfoot' Units In Combat" Alexander Mladenov Page 27 - "Captain Smirnov" attacked from the "Kokari-Sharshari" Su-25 attack aircraft "
- Army, units of frontier troops (deployment in Afghanistan) "Main Combat Units and Parts of the 40th Army"
- The newspaper "Krasnaya Zvezda" 22.04.2009 "Daudi name of the Hero"
- The newspaper "Red Star" 22.04.2009 "And the eternal battle"
- "Courage: Leaving your heart in Afgan" magazine "Brother" May 2011 Doc.film of M.Leshchinsky "The Hidden War"
- Heroes of the Country website by the 40th Army to defeat the Kokari-Sharshari base area of the enemy in 1986 (Site Kunduz.ru - Appendix 27
- Bogdanov VA - Lieutenant-General, Chief of the South direction of the GOU GS book "The Afghan War ( 1979-1989): Memoirs »p.142 - M .: AST," The Soviet Writer, Moscow "2005 ISBN 5-265-06354-4
- "Secrets of the Afghan War" Lyakhovsky AA, Zabrodin V.М. - page 84
- "Afghanistan: the war of scouts" V. Markovsky, V. Milyachenko - page 71
- "Afghanistan: From the War of the 80s to the Forecast of New Wars", Gen. E.G. Nikitenko - Page 39
- "Recognition of the Mujahideen" A.Tamonikov
- "IN AND. Varennikov: Unrepeatable »Book.5
