= Ilyas Daudi =

Iliyas Daudi
- Ильяс Дильшатович Дауди
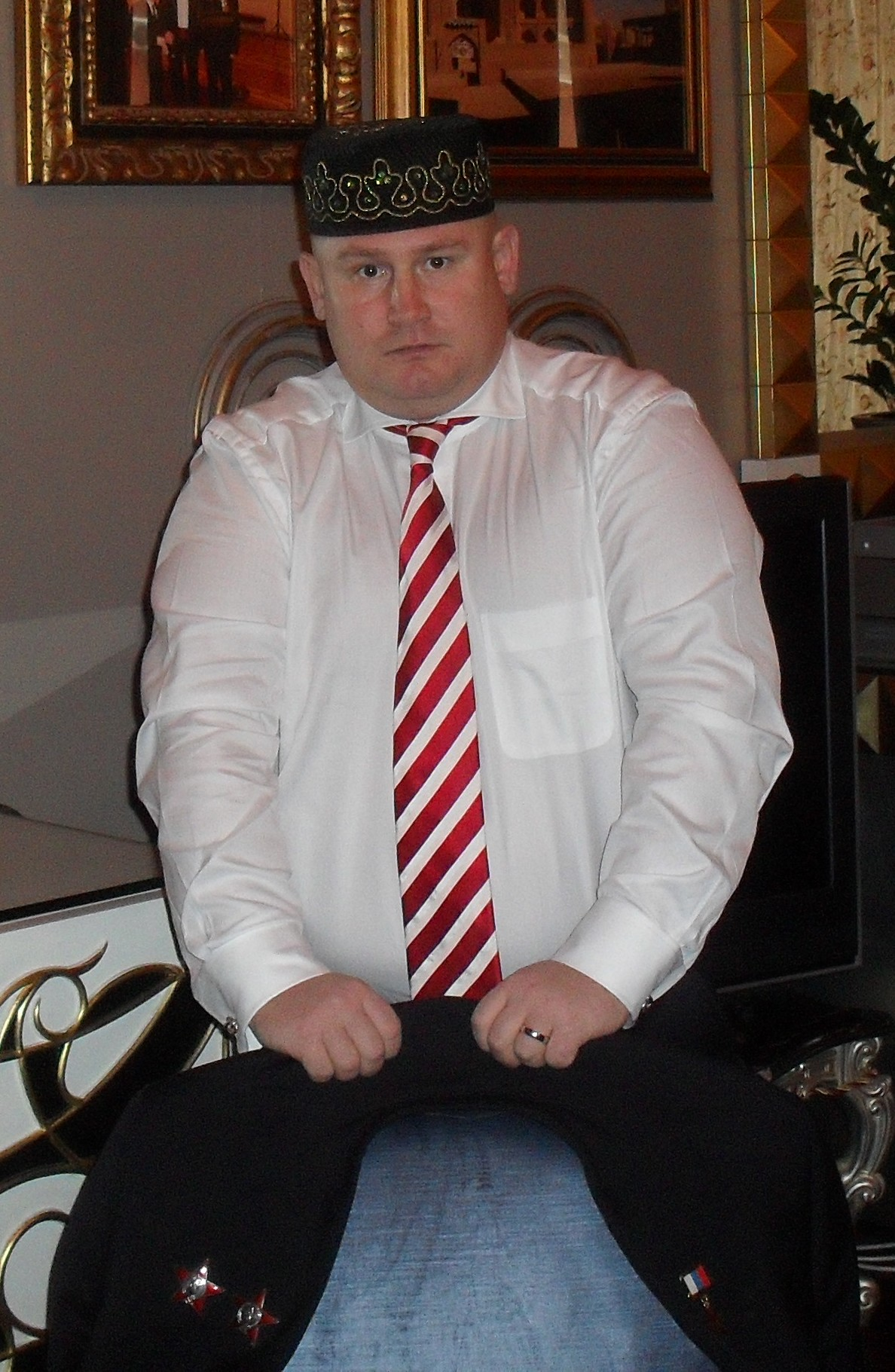
- Born: January 29, 1967; Aznakayevo, Russian SFSR, Soviet Union
- Military career
- Allegiance: Soviet Union
- Branch: Soviet Army
- Service years: 1985–1986
- Conflicts: Operation Trap; Soviet War in Afghanistan
- Awards: Hero of the Russian Federation; Order of the Red Star; Order of the Red Star; Order of Holy Prince Daniel of Moscow; Jubilee Medal "70 Years of the Armed Forces of the USSR"

Iliyas Daudi (Russian: Ильяс Дильшатович Дауди; born January 29, 1967) is a former Soviet and Russian military serviceman, best known for being one of few veterans of the Soviet–Afghan War who was awarded the title Hero of Russian Federation.

== Early and family life ==
Iliyas Daudi was born in Aznakayevo, Russian SFSR, Soviet Union. In 1984 he graduated from a secondary school No.2 and after that became a champion of local and federal boxing tournaments who won a title of Candidate for Master of Sport of the USSR.

Both of Iliyas Daudi's grandfathers - Misbakhetdin Safin and Ahmadullah Idrisov fought in the Second World War against Nazi Germany. During a breakthrough from the encirclement near Bryansk in 1942, grandfather Akhmadulla was seriously wounded by an artillery shell, his thigh was amputated. Exactly the same injury, 44 years later, in August 1986, in Afghanistan, his grandson, a military intelligence officer, Iliyas Daudi, who was blown up by an Italian anti-personnel mine.

In the same year he applied to study in Economical Department of Gubkin Russian State University of Oil and Gas and his application process was successful. Nevertheless, being a student of prestigious university he volunteered to military service in Soviet Army.

== Military service ==
In August 1985, after basic military training Daudi was assigned to military reconnaissance unit of 149th Guards Motor Rifle Regiment of Limited Contingent of Soviet forces in Afghanistan (official title of 40th Army).

His military career started from reconnaissance operations in the rank of senior scout, then he took a position of a squad-leader of surveillance section. Soviet Colonel General Alexander Skorodumov wrote in his memories that Iliyas Daudi was not only formal leader, but the informal one too. Moreover, sometimes Daudi faced accusations in not obeying the rules and even hooliganism Surprisingly, it wasn't an obstacle for him to become a deputy of platoon commander and join a Communist Party of the Soviet Union.

On 18 August 1986, I.Daudi participated in a large-scale Soviet operation Operation Trap on the Afghan-Iranian border in Herat province to capture the base fortified complex of the mujahideen Kokari-Sharshari of a prominent afghan warlord Ismail Khan. In battle, risking his life, he saved three comrades. A day later, 23 August in violent clashes with mujahideen, on a mission to supply his soldiers with ammunition, he stepped on an Italian antipersonnel mine. The explosion blew off his thigh and he received a severe concussion. According to the testimony of his army friends, he asked them to shoot him to get rid of the burden, but they managed to evacuate him from the combat zone In November 1986, he was decommissioned from the Soviet Army after spending a lot of time in rehabilitation in hospital.

Many years later his combat performance was investigated and evaluated as outstanding heroism. In December 2009 by the order of Russian President Dmitry Medvedev he was awarded with a Hero of Russian Federation.
