= Paul Connett =

Paul Connett is a prominent water fluoridation critic, executive director of the Binghamton, New York based Fluoride Action Network (FAN), one of the largest organizations opposing water fluoridation worldwide. Critics have stated that The Fluoride Action Network is funded, at least in part, by Joseph Mercola, who has been identified by the Centre for Countering Digital Hate as a leading purveyor of COVID-19 disinformation. FAN executive director Stuart Cooper has stated, "Mercola is among thousands of donors and his money accounts for a single-digit percentage of FAN's contributions".

Connett has been invited by environmental organizations opposing fluoridation to lecture on the subject in fluoridating countries such as Canada, Israel, Australia and New Zealand. Connett has stated, "It’s politics that is interfering with science in this issue...It’s a matter of political will, and you cannot change political will if you don’t get the people. We must involve the people."

== Early life ==
Connett is English, and is a graduate of Cambridge University. He holds a Ph.D. in chemistry from Dartmouth College.

== Political activism ==
Connett became involved in political activism in 1968. He volunteered for Eugene McCarthy's presidential campaign, where he met Allard K. Lowenstein. Lowenstein and Connett founded the American Committee to Keep Biafra Alive, in response to the famine caused by the Biafran War. In 1971, Connett co-founded Operation Omega, a non-violent group taking humanitarian aid into East Pakistan during the Bangladesh Liberation War. Paul's wife Ellen was arrested during one of Omega's trips into East Pakistan and spent two months imprisoned there.

== University career ==
After teaching chemistry and toxicology for 23 years at St. Lawrence University, Canton, NY, he retired from his full professorship. He is currently also the director of the American Environmental Health Studies Project (AEHSP).

== Fluoridation campaign ==
In 2004, Connett published the paper 50 Reasons to Oppose Fluoridation in Medical Veritas, a pseudoscientific journal described by QuackWatch as "fundamentally flawed". In 2010 he coauthored; The Case against Fluoride: How Hazardous Waste Ended Up in Our Drinking Water and the Bad Science and Powerful Politics That Keep It There along with Dr. James Beck and Dr. H. Spedding Micklem. He also wrote the book in 2013; "The Zero Waste Solution". and assisted the city of Naples in pursuing its zero waste strategy.
