= Kalyan Mitra =

Bangladeshi writer, actor, director and playwright

- কল্যাণ মিত্র

Personal details
- Born: 1939 Kushtia, Bengal Presidency, British India
- Awards: Bangla Academy Literary Award

Kalyan Mitra (born 1939) was a Bangladeshi writer, actor, director and playwright. He received the Bangla Academy Literary Award in 1972 for his plays.

== Career ==
Mitra was born in 1939 in Kushtia. His plays were performed on stage and radio in the 1960s and 1970s. Most of his plays were published from Bogra. Although he was involved in social drama, he wrote plays on the liberation war of Bangladesh. His satirical play Jallader Darbare and Mir Jafarer Rujnamcha was broadcast from Swadhin Bangla Betar Kendra in 1971.

== Recognition ==
- Bangla Academy Literary Award (1972)
- Prabha Natya Gosthi Award
- Lok Natyadal Gold Medal (2019)

== Works ==
- Dayi Ke (1960)
- Shapath (1967)
- Shubha Bibaha (1967)
- Pradipshikha (1967)
- Kuyasha Kanna (1967)
- Ananya (1967),
- Triratna (1967)
- Sagar Sencha Manik (1968)
- Taka Ana Pai (1968)
- Pasher Badi
- Baiji
- Lalon Fakir (1977)
- Shurjamahal
