= Abu Mayeen Ashfakus Samad =

- আবু মঈন মোহাম্মদ আশফাকুস সামাদ
- Portrait of Samad
- Born: 9 January 1949; Faridpur, East Bengal, Pakistan
- Died: 20 November 1971 (aged 22); Raiganj, Rajshahi, Bangladesh
- Burial place: Jaimonirhat
- Education: University of Dhaka
- Military career
- Allegiance: Bangladesh
- Branch: Bangladesh Army
- Service years: 1971
- Rank: Second Lieutenant
- Unit: East Bengal Regiment
- Conflicts: Bangladesh Liberation War †
- Awards: Bir Uttom

Abu Mayeen Ashfakus Samad (9 January 1949 – 20 November 1971) was an officer of the Bangladesh Army from its first batch. He was killed in the Bangladesh Liberation War and was awarded the second highest gallantry award of Bangladesh, Bir Uttam.

== Early life ==
Samad was born in Faridpur, East Bengal, Pakistan, on 9 January 1949. He graduated from St. Joseph Higher Secondary School and then finished his HSC from Notre Dame College. He was admitted in the University of Dhaka, Department of Statistics.

== Career ==
On 25 March 1971, the Pakistan Army launched Operation Searchlight and the Bangladesh Liberation war started, On 29 March 1971, Samad moved to Kishoreganj with a few friends. There they trained under the 2 East Bengal Regiment and 4 East Bengal Regiment. After training they moved back to Dhaka. He received further training in Agartala, India. He fought under the 2 East Bengal Regiment, Saldanadi Sub-sector. On 9 October 1971, he was commissioned in the first batch of Bangladesh Army. He was posted in Shahebganj Sub-sector of Sector 6. He fought a number of battles and liberated Bhurungamari.

== Death and legacy ==
The Mukti Bahini launched an attack on Raiganj base of Pakistan Army. After Pakistan army launched a counterattack, Samad provided cover fire so the Mukti Bahini soldiers could escape. He was killed in action that day. He was buried in the graveyard near Jaimonirhat Bazar with full military honors. Jaimonirhat was renamed Samad Nagar. He was awarded Bir Uttam by the government of Bangladesh. A road in Dhaka has been renamed Bir Uttam Ashfakus Samad Sarak after him. On 27 March 2015, Bangladesh Army erected a monument dedicated to Samad in Rangpur Cantonment.
