= Javara =

Javara is a village in the Mathura district of the state of Uttar Pradesh in India. According to the national 2011 Census of India it has a population of 13,862 people.

== Politics ==
Mant (Assembly constituency) is the Vidhan Sabha constituency. Mathura (Lok Sabha constituency) is the parliamentary constituency.
