= Turbat killings =

2009 murder of Balochs in Pakistan

The Turbat killings refers to the murder of three Baloch nationalist political leaders in April 2009 in Turbat, Balochistan, Pakistan. The nationalist leaders were kidnapped by gunmen and murdered. The three murdered were:

- Ghulam Mohammed Baloch, 45, chairman of the Baloch National Movement
- Lala Munir Baloch, 50, general secretary of the Baloch National Front
- Sher Mohammed Baloch, 35, vice chairman of the Baloch Republican Party

According to an eyewitness, the trio were picked up by members of a security agency after they attended a court hearing in Turbat on April 3, 2009. Their mutilated and decomposed bodies were found five days later on April 8, 2009 in Pidrak, 35km away from their place of arrest.

Pakistani intelligence agencies, including the Inter-Services Intelligence and the Military Intelligence, were accused of being behind the killing. The killings sparked protests, riots and strikes in towns and cities in Balochistan and other Baloch-dominated areas of Pakistan.

== See also ==
- Insurgency in Balochistan
