= Chorompotro =

Radio program

Chorompotro (Bengali: চরমপত্র) was a popular radio program during the Bangladesh Liberation War broadcast from the radio broadcasting center Shadhin Bangla Betar Kendro. It was hosted by M. R. Akhtar Mukul.

== History ==
Mukul, a young Bengali, started a program from the hidden Shadhin Bangla Betar Kendro, The Radio Station for Independent Bangladesh, in 1971 while a war between Bangladeshi civilians and Pakistani armed forces was underway. Chorompotro, meaning 'the extreme letter' was a program. Here, Mukul used to describe the positions of the war with a voice described as 'witty' or 'funny'. He portrayed the position of Pakistani militants as uncomfortable and the position of Bangladeshi fighter as victorious. Chorompotro was the most popular program of that station. The most effective result of the program was informing the Bangladeshis of the state of the military. It is said that hundreds of civilians chose to join the military due to this program. Later, Chorompotro was printed and published as a collection.
