= 2006 Pakistan landmine blast =

Terrorist incident in Pakistan

The 2006 Pakistan landmine blast occurred on 10 March 2006, in the Pakistani city of Dera Bugti in Balochistan province. 26 people were killed and seven were injured when their car, on the way to a wedding, hit at least one anti-tank landmine. Raziq Bugti, a spokesman for the Baluchistan provincial government, said the mine was planted by rebels working for the tribal chief Nawab Akbar Bugti. He said that most of the victims were "women and children. Seven people were injured... there could have been more than one landmine".
