= Operation Omega =

Humanitarian aid group

Operation Omega was a London-based group that took humanitarian aid into East Pakistan during the 1971 Bangladesh genocide. Several members of the group were arrested and two were imprisoned for their actions.

== Background ==
In March 1971, East Pakistan declared its independence from West Pakistan, and its intention to form a new country, Bangladesh. This led to a violent military crackdown by the West Pakistani military junta, as they tried to re-establish control. A civil war broke out, between supporters of the West Pakistani government, and Bengali nationalists.

Estimates for the number of civilians killed in 1971 range from 200,000 to 3,000,000. The scale of the deaths became clear in the West when Pakistani journalist Anthony Mascarenhas fled to the United Kingdom and, on 13 June 1971, published an article in The Sunday Times describing the systematic killings by the military.

The civil war continued for most of 1971. According to Peace News, as well as the many deaths, the war forced over 5 million civilians to flee their homes, most crossing into India. The remaining 70 million people in East Pakistan had little access to outside aid. The Pakistani army controlled relief supplies as a method of subduing the rebellion. In particular, the Urdu-speaking Bihari Muslims were forced from their homes in large numbers by Bengali nationalists. The Biharis in East Pakistan had left the Indian state of Bihar at the Partition of India. They had generally supported the West Pakistan junta's rule in East Pakistan, and many had fought in militias on the side of the government in the Civil War. As a result, the Bengali nationalist attempted to either kill the Biharis or expel them from East Pakistan. India would not allow them to cross the border into Bihar state, so they were trapped in the border area of East Pakistan.

== Operation Omega ==
News of the outbreak of civil war in East Pakistan was reported in Peace News in March 1971 by Roger Moody. In the June issue, Moody first announced the formation of Operation Omega:

a small group of Londoners...sailing supplies into East Bengal, regardless of the consequences to the participants...The project would bear obvious similarities to nonviolent interventions of the recent past - especially the Phoenix Voyages by a Quaker Action Group in 1967-68

The Phoenix Voyages were a series of humanitarian trips made to relieve the famine in Biafra following the civil war there. Paul Connett had been a key player in the American response to the Biafran crisis, working as the coordinator of the American Committee to Keep Biafra Alive. In 1971, Connett co-founded Operation Omega with Roger Moody.

Operation Omega was supported by Peace News and by War Resisters' International.

=== First crossing ===
By August 1971, the first two Operation Omega teams arrived in Calcutta. The Omega Team One members were: Marc Duran, Christine Pratt, Roger Moody and Dan Due. In Omega Team Two were Ben Crow, Dan Grotta, Doreen Plamping and Freer Spreckley.

The teams crossed from India into East Pakistan on 17 August, carrying food and saris. Both teams were immediately apprehended by members of the Pakistani Army. After a day of negotiations with the army, the Omega teams decided to sleep in their cars and attempt to continue with their missions the following morning. At 9:20 pm on the evening of 17 August, both teams were arrested by Pakistani forces and taken to Jessore.

The next morning both teams were returned to the Indian border and told not to return to East Pakistan, or they would face arrest and prosecution.

=== Second crossing ===
There was disagreement about the best way to resume operations. One group believed that relief distribution, in secret, was the primary goal, while the second group preferred to instigate a direct, non-violent confrontation with the Pakistanis. The next crossing attempt took place on 5 September 1971. The first team of Freer Spreckley, Marc Duran and Gordon Slaven successfully took food supplies into a region that the Pakistani Army had abandoned, delivered the food to the local population and returned to India after two days in East Pakistan. They believed these were the first foreign aid supplies to be distributed there since the outbreak of the civil war.

On the same day, the second crossed the border near Petrapole. This group was: Christine Pratt, Joyce Keniwell, Ben Crow and Dan Due. They were detained by the army about 300 yards (270 m) inside East Pakistan. The British consulate was informed that all four would be tried by a military tribunal. Initially held without trial, the team began a hunger strike, demanding that they be formally charged and tried. After five days, they were tried for carrying "subversive literature". They were told before the trial that they would be found guilty and sentenced to eight years. They were found guilty, but were deported from East Pakistan rather than jailed, around 15 September 1971.

=== Third crossing ===
On 6 October 1971, a third crossing was made by a team of two, Gordon Slaven from London and Ellen Connett - Paul Connett's pregnant wife, from Philadelphia. They were arrested and tried under the Foreigners Act of 1946. They were convicted of unauthorised entry into the country and were sentenced to two years imprisonment. The Pakistani press claimed that Operation Omega had been "making deliberate attempts to embarrass the government".

The pair spent two months of their sentence in jail, before being released after the surrender of the Pakistani army and the beginning of the transition to the new Bangladeshi government.

Peace activist April Carter wrote that Operation Omega was successful in overcoming illness, equipment malfunction and mistrust from those it was trying to help. It delivered food to those at risk before conventional relief agencies could do so, and largely achieved its aims of political resistance to the Pakistani regime.

=== Continued relief work ===
Operation Omega continued relief efforts into 1973. They took aid into Bangladesh and assisted with reconciliation and long-term reconstruction projects, especially in the Bihari community. In August 1973, the Operation Omega team decided to stop their direct relief efforts and focus instead on a campaign for a political solution on the Indian subcontinent.

== British surveillance ==
During 1971, an undercover police officer infiltrated the pro-Bangladesh independence group in London under the name "Peter Fredericks".

== Notes and references ==
=== References ===
- Peace News (1977). "Operation Omega". In Hare, A. Paul; Blumberg, Herbert H. (eds.). Liberation Without Violence: A Third-Party Approach. London: Rex Collings. pp. 196–206. ISBN 0860-36-0237.
