= Crack Platoon =

Special commando unit of the Bangladesh Forces

The Crack Platoon was a special commando team of the Mukti Bahini. which was formed in 1971, during the Bangladesh Liberation War. It was formed by young members of the Mukti Bahini, which carried out commando operations in Dhaka and its surroundings and led by Major Khaled Mosharraf. The commandos were mostly students and civilians, who received guerrilla training later in the training camps for Mukti Bahini and then engaged in battle against the Pakistani Army.

== Formation ==
=== Formation and deployment of Crack Platoon ===
In June 1971, during the Bangladesh Liberation War, the World Bank sent a mission to observe the situation in East Pakistan. The media cell of the Pakistani Government was circulating a news that situation in East Pakistan was stable and normal. Khaled Mosharraf, a sector commander of Mukti Bahini, planned to deploy a special commando team. The task assigned to the team was to carry out commando operations and activities in Dhaka. The major objective of this team was to prove that the situation was not normal actually. Moreover, Pakistan at that time, was expecting economic aid from World Bank, which was assumed to be spent to buy arms. The plan was to make World Bank Mission understand the true situation of East Pakistan and stop sanctioning the aid. Khaled along with Abu Taher Mohammad Haider, another sector commander formed the Crack Platoon. Initially, number of commandos in the platoon was 17. Those commandos were receiving training in Melaghar Camp at that time. From Melaghar, commandos of Crack Platoon headed for Dhaka on 4 June 1971 and launched guerrilla operation on 5 June. Later, number of commandos was increased, the platoon was split and deployed in different areas surrounding Dhaka.

== Major objectives and success ==
The basic objectives of Crack Platoon were to demonstrate the strength of the Mukti Bahini, by fighting the Pakistani Army and their collaborators. Another major objective was proving to the international community that the situation in East Pakistan was not normal. That commando team also aimed at inspiring the people of Dhaka who were frequently being victims of killing and torture. These objectives were successfully fulfilled by Crack Platoon. The World Bank mission, in its report, clearly described the hazardous situation that was prevailing in East Pakistan. In the report, the World Bank mission prescribed to end the military regime in East Pakistan. Between July and September 1971, operations by the Crack Platoon resulted in the death of 8 Pakistan Army commissioned officers from the rank of Second Lieutenant to Colonel and 31 soldiers and NCOs Crack Platoon carried out several successful and important operations. The power supply in Dhaka was devastated which caused severe problem for Pakistan Army and the military administration in Dhaka. The Chinese restaurants in Dhaka had become almost prohibited for Pakistani army officers.

== Recognition and awards ==
The role of Crack Platoon in the Bangladesh Liberation War was highly appreciated by the post war government of Bangladesh and the people. Six commandos including Mofazzal Hossain Chowdhury, the leader of Crack Platoon and a former minister were awarded Bir Bikrom, third highest gallantry award in Bangladesh and two commandos were awarded Bir Protik, fourth highest gallantry award in Bangladesh.

== Notable members of Crack Platoon ==
- Abu Sayeed Khan
- Abdul Halim Chowdhury Jewel
- Ahmed Munier Bhashon
- Ahrar Ahmed
- Ali Ahmed Ziauddin
- Anwar Rahman
- Artist Shahabuddin Ahmed
- Bodiul Alam Bodi
- Golam Dastagir Gazi
- Fateh Ali Chowdhury
- Nasiruddin Yousuf Bachchu
- Sadeque Hossain Khoka
- Singer Azam Khan
- Raisul Islam Asad
- Shahadat Chowdhury
- Shafi Imam Rumi
- Magfar Ahmed Chowdhury (Azad)
- Qamrul Huq Shawpon
- AFMA Harris
- Mukhtar
- Masud Sadik Chullu
- Habibul Alam
- Humayun Kabir Khan
- Ishtiaq Aziz Ulfat
- Kazi Kamaluddin
- Mofazzal Hossain Chowdhury Maya
- Shamsul Hoque Chowdhury (Babul)
