= Jinjira massacre =

1971 mass killing of civilians by the Pakistan Army during the Bangladesh Liberation War

- Part of Bangladesh genocide
- Location: Jinjira, Dhaka, East Pakistan
- Date: April 2, 1971
- Target: Mostly Bengali Hindus
- Attack type: massacre, ethnic cleansing
- Victim: Estimated to about 3,000
- Perpetrator: Pakistani Army: Razakars

The Jinjira massacre (Bengali: জিঞ্জিরা গণহত্যা, romanized: Jiñjirā gaṇahatyā) was a planned killing of civilians by the Pakistan army during the Bangladesh liberation war of 1971.

The killing took place at the unions Jinjira, Kalindi and Shubhadya of Keraniganj Upazila across the Buriganga River from Dhaka.

== Background ==
The 1971 Bangladesh atrocities began as the Pakistan army launched Operation Searchlight on 25 March 1971 to suppress the Bengali uprising in then East Pakistan. As a reaction, people from Dhaka flocked to Keraniganj on the other side of the river. The union Jinjira and nearby areas were inhabited by a large number of Hindu families. The elements of Pakistan army, now in control of Dhaka city after the crackdown of 25 March marked Jinjira and surrounding area as a target for military operation.

== Massacre ==
The army started to amass forces around Keraniganj from midnight of 2 April. They took control of the Mitford Hospital by the river. At around 5 am, they commenced the attack by throwing flares from the roof of the mosque adjacent to the hospital. The army moved into Jinjira and opened fire on people. The massacre continued for hours. One incident took place beside a pond near Nandail Dak Street, where 60 people were killed. Women were raped. The soldiers also burned down houses and left no house undamaged. More than a thousand people died in this massacre.

== Cover-up in the Pakistani media ==
In the night of 2 April Pakistan Television broadcast news about strong military action against separatist miscreants taking shelter at Jinjira of Keraniganj on the other side of Buriganga. On 3 April The Morning News came up with the headline "Actions taken against miscreants at Jinjira".

== See also ==
- List of massacres in Bangladesh
