= Operation Trap =

1986 Soviet offensive during the Soviet-Afghan War

- Part of the Soviet–Afghan War
Date	18–26 August 1986
Location	Kokari-Sharshari fortified depot Herat Province DRA
Result	Soviet-Afghanistan Victory

Belligerents
Soviet Union; Democratic Republic of Afghanistan	Afghan Mujahideen; Iran

Commanders and leaders
(Soviet Union) Valentin Varennikov	Ismail Khan

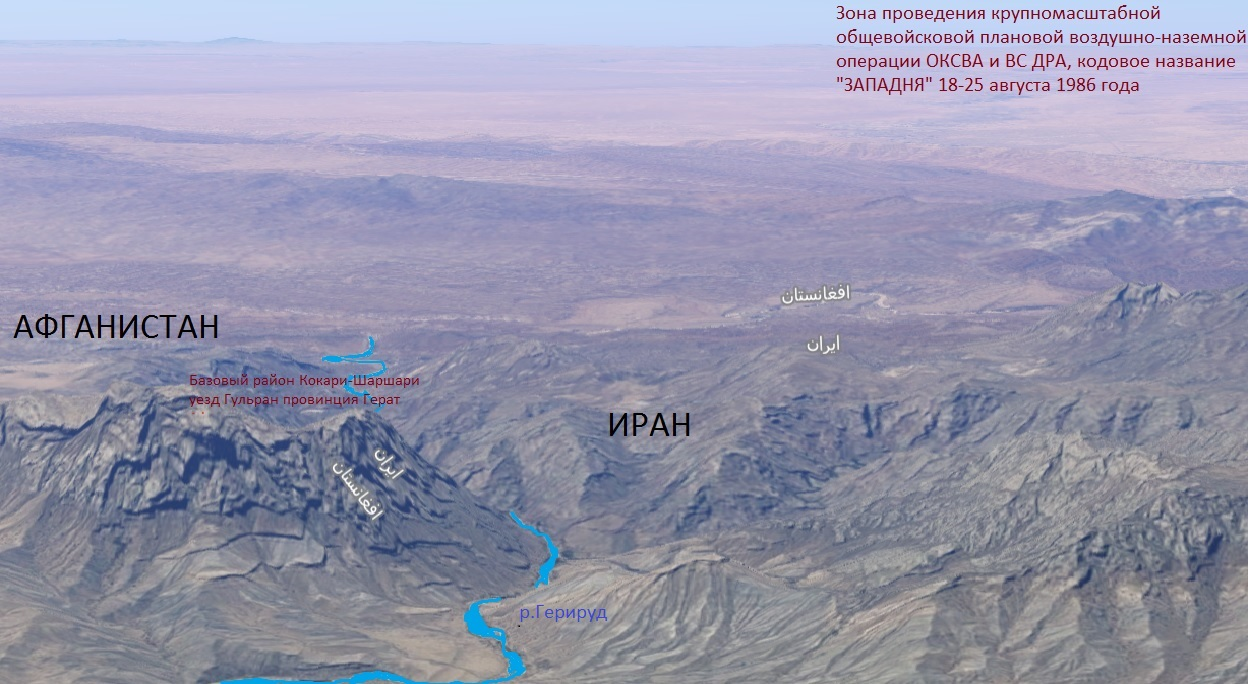
Kokari Sharshari, Herat Province, Afghanistan

Operation Trap (Russian: Операция Западня) was a code name of a large-scale Soviet offensive operation during the Soviet-Afghan War which targeted the mujahideen garrison of the Kokari-Sharshari fortified supply base. The active stage of the operation was launched on August 18, 1986 to clear out the rebel positions and the surrounding areas with the intent of breaking a mujahideen logistics chain in the northwest triangle of Herat Province in the Gulran District.

During the presence of the Restricted contingent of Soviet troops in the Republic of Afghanistan in the western province of Herat, a large-scale air-ground combined arms operation was conducted under the codename "Zapadnya" (Trap). The goal of the planned joint operation of Soviet troops and government forces of the Democratic Republic of Afghanistan was the liquidation of the logistic support bodies and the armed opposition groups of the "Western United Group" of the large field commander Ismail Khan.

The operation was carried out in three stages on the broad front of the plain and mountain areas in the vicinity of the old Herat and in the mountainous region of Sharshari bordering Iran. On the plains of the first and third stages of the operation, the areas adjacent to Herat from the members of the local formations were cleansed, on the mountainous: the mastering of the Kokari-Sharshari base area, the main support and transshipment point on the border with Iran.

One of the main features of the operation, along with other large-scale operations of the 40th Army in Panjshir, Kunar, operations "Smerch", "Maneuver", and "Uragan", was its clearly-pronounced aerial-land character with wide application assault-assault actions. As in most planned joint operations, a large number of airborne assault forces were used to defeat the enemy. The second important feature of Operation Trap was simultaneous hostilities in two remote 140–160 km areas of mountainous and flat terrain.

This operation was recognized as one of the most successful large-scale combined arms operations of OKVA in the history of the Soviet-Afghan War with minimal losses.

== Situation in the region ==
Armed formations operating in the province of Herat, supplying food and manpower were obtained from numerous villages located in the vicinity of Herat, in the vast green zone and the adjacent Gerirud valley. On the bordering territory with Iran, the rebels set up places for collection and rest, there were also delivered weapons from nearby bases in Iran. Under the cover of the green zone, the vast thickets of shrubs, gardens and vineyards - the rebels were selected to the location of military units and fired them, made armed attacks on the convoy, after the attacks instantly dissolved in the surrounding villages, it was no less difficult to find them there than in the mountains. A number of detachments operated in Herat itself, dividing it into spheres of influence, and fighting not only with government troops, but also with each other. In the city were found strong points, stocks of weapons and ammunition. During the fighting in the city, the Su-25 attack aircraft had to strike, in the rebel-controlled quarters and the intelligence houses indicated.

== Military and political objectives of the operation ==
Strengthening the state power of the Democratic Republic of Afghanistan, the stabilization of HPE in the region bordering Iran the defeat of the "Western United Grouping" of Ismail Khan blocking the supply of weapons and ammunition to various international Islamic organizations - the Shiite Eight, the Islamic Society of Afghanistan the liquidation of the rear services in the region bordering Iran, the mastery of the Kokari-Sharshari base area, the seizure of weapons and ammunition depots.

== Operation Plan ==
Under the plan of the operation in each region, a separate grouping of troops was formed, consisting of a total of 14 battalions, consisting of 5 Soviet and 9 Afghan. This procedure allowed blocking during the operation - the transfer of enemy units from one area to another. The idea of the initial stage of the operation was to mislead the enemy in relation to the area, the forthcoming hostilities, the sudden abandonment of permanent deployment sites, all participating in the operation of the troops. The 17th Infantry Division of the Afghan Army was to be deployed to the west, to the Kokari-Sharshari area, and the Afghan units that had arrived from Kabul - to block the green zone of Herat, together with the units of the 5th Motorized Infantry Division (MSD). The battalions of the 201st Motorized Infantry Division and the 345th Parachute Regiment (APDP) were to be transported by helicopters to the Kokari-Sharshari area and the landing of tactical airborne troops to the dominant heights along the Gerirud River, along which the Afghan-Iranian border crossed, to cut off way to the base area from Iranian territory.

In the same area by its own motion from the north, according to the plan of operation. received an order to go - one battalion of the 12th motorized rifle regiment of the 5th SME and a motor-maneuvering group of the Takhta-Bazar detachment of the USSR border troops, to seize the dominant heights and block the base from the north. Approached by that time in the area of operation of the 17th Infantry Division of the Armed Forces of the DRA was tasked to block the base from the south. Aviation of the 40th Army was ordered to bomb-assault attacks on all strongpoints. All routes of movement of Soviet and Afghan troops, according to the plan of operation, were conceived complex, so that the enemy lost control over them. For each area of the operation, its combat plan was developed.

In the green zone of Herat, the fighting was planned to be carried out according to the following plan: five battalions of the 5th motorized rifle division and seven Afghan battalions were to block the western part of the green zone, including the city. Since the output of units for blocking was carried out under the guise of a march to combat operations in other areas, the blocking of the green zone was planned to take place suddenly. Immediately in the zone of blocking, it was planned to conduct combat operations by two Afghan battalions (special missions and commandos). At the final stage of the operation, the Soviet units had to tightly block the city of Herat, and the Afghan units had to enter it and ensure the actions of the state security officers and the Ministry of Internal Affairs to eliminate the counter-revolutionary underground.

The goal of the flat stage of the operation was also to ensure the safety of the movement of the columns of auto-armored vehicles along the route: Kushka-Herat-Kandahar, transporting military, civilian and humanitarian supplies to the southern provinces of Helmand and Kandahar.

== Command of the parties ==
The command of the forces of OKVA was carried out by Army General VI Varennikov, head of the operational group of the USSR Defense Ministry in Afghanistan. From the 40th Army - deputy commander, Major-General Kondratiev G. G. The formation of anti-government forces in the province of Herat, consisted of the units of the Sunni Party "Islamic Society of Afghanistan" its leaders: Burhanuddin Rabbani, Ismail Khan, a member of the Peshawar Seven; Shiite "pro-Iranian" parties, members of the alliance, the so-called "Shiite Eight", its leaders: Karim Ahmad Yak Daste, Sheikh Nasrullah Mansour and others. The overall coordination of the "Western United Group" in the region was carried out by Turan Ismail, better known as Ismail Khan, a professional military man, commander of one of the divisions of the 17th Infantry Division of the DRA Army in the province of Herat.

== Reasons for conducting. Plan of operation. Preliminary actions ==
In the second half of 1986, the Soviet command accepted the decision agreed with the President of the Republic of Afghanistan M. Najibullah to defeat the "Kokari-Sharshari" enemy base, which played the same role in the west of Afghanistan as in the east - Javara. The base area was located on the very border with Iran and included a large number of warehouses of weapons, ammunition, food and other property. Given the proximity to the state border, the Soviet aviation had requirements - not to allow violation of the border with Iran, so the flight routes of aviation in the area of the base "Kokari-Sharshari" ran parallel to the border.

To carry out the operation, a grouping of troops was formed in the 28 battalions: the Soviet - 19 and the Afghan - 18. Such a number of troops to gather from the Herat area was impossible, and therefore most of the units were transferred from Kabul, Bagram and Kunduz by air, which is not could go unnoticed. The commander of military operations from the Soviet side was the deputy commander of the 40th Army, Major-General Kondratiev G. G. General leadership and coordination of the actions of Soviet and Afghan troops was carried out by General of the Army V.I. Varennikov

The idea of the operation was to conduct military operations, simultaneously - in two regions: directly by the defeat of the base of "Kokari-Sharshari" and in the western part of the green zone of Herat. At the final stage, liquidate the counter-revolutionary underground in the city. Each region had its own grouping of troops, consisting of 14 battalions: the Soviet - 5, the Afghan - 9. This procedure, during the operation - did not allow the transfer of opposition units from one area to another. To a certain extent, it was possible to mislead the enemy regarding the area of the upcoming military operations, in order that the troops participating in the operation simultaneously left the points of deployment. At the same time, the 17th Infantry Division was to move west to the Kokari-Sharshari area, and the Afghan units that arrived from Kabul to block the green zone of Herat, together with the units of the 5th Motorized Infantry Division.

Before the beginning of the operation, a sound reconnaissance base was conducted. The data obtained by the intelligence group proved to be accurate and reliable. Thanks to this, the strikes of aviation and artillery were effective - practically all ground structures and fire points were destroyed. Despite the desperate resistance of the rebels, our losses were minimal.

== Ismail-khan's grouping ==
Ismail Khan ( Turan Ismail - Afghan Captain Ismail ) - a former cadre officer of the 17th Infantry Division of the DRA BC, in a short time managed to subdue the disparate units of the armed opposition in the provinces: Herat, Badgis, Farah, Ghor, Nimroz, and others, "and led a massive armed resistance throughout the west of Afghanistan. Turan Ismail, in the course of the struggle received the nickname "The Lion of Herat".

The member of the Islamic Society of Afghanistan Party (IOA), Turan Ismail was a member of its supreme council, being the third most influential after Burhanuddin Rabbani and Ahmad Shah Massoud. Simultaneously with the financial assistance of [CIA in Operation Cyclone, where Burkhanuddin Rabbani was one of the distributors of foreign financial assistance, Ismail Khan had his own channels of financial and military support, being the distributor of the funds of the Alliance of Eight (the Shiite Eight) "- an alliance of spiritual leaders of the" Shiite parties "of the Mujahideen, the Mashhad, Kum, and others based in Iran. Turan Ismail had 199 detachments of 4655 bayonets.

Ismail Khan was the most prominent of the local field commanders. In the past, the army captain, who went to the Mujahideen after the April Revolution. Military experience, literacy and exactingness quickly allowed him to become a local emir, in the power of which there were seven provinces and an army of five thousand militants. The number of the Turan Ismail group, although significant, at different times and depending on the source of its reduction, was constantly different.

== Totals ==
The seizure and destruction of the Kokari-Sharshali base by Soviet and Afghan troops undermined the faith of the population of the province of Herat in the possibilities and strength of the opposition, in the ranks of which, immediately after the fall of the base, there was a split. Part of the ringleaders of groups and groups of armed opposition, especially in the green zone of Herat, even during the fighting began to negotiate with the authorities on the cessation of armed resistance and the transition to the side of the government. Later, they made relevant agreements with representatives of the provincial authorities. During the fighting, 26 different warehouses with weapons and ammunition, 25 adapted for the defense of clay fortress houses, 32 cave-shelters were destroyed. During the operation in this area, one Soviet serviceman was killed and five were wounded.

The success of Operation Zapadnya, on the border with Iran on the capture of the Kokari-Shashari base, also consisted in the fact that after the defeat of the opposition in this region, the process of transferring some rebel groups to the side of state power.

The main phase of the operation lasted until August 26, 1986. As a result, Soviet troops destroyed 32 underground structures, 26 ammunition and weapon stockpiles and 25 rammed-earth defensive constructions. Some surviving defenders managed to escape to Iran using the remnants of the tunnel system. All captured war materials and trophies were evacuated or demolished by the Soviets.

After achieving the main strategic goal of the operation, many participants have been awarded and promoted in their ranks, with ceremonies continuing long after the collapse of the Soviet Union. In December 2009 a former Soviet/Russian military serviceman Iliyas Daudi received a Hero of Russian Federation, a highest military title of Russia roughly equal to Hero of Soviet Union.

== Soviet and Russian literature ==
- VI Varennikov: The Unrepeatable Book 5
- "The Afghan War. Memories "pp. 140-142 author of the book Bogdanov VA, Lieutenant-General, Head of the Southern Department of the General Staff of the General Staff of the USSR Ministry of Defense, Chief of Staff of the Operational Group of the USSR Ministry of Defense in DRA (1987-1988)
- "40 Army - a war in the mountains" Colonel-General VM Barynkin - Chief of the General Staff of the General Staff of the Ministry of Defense of the Russian Federation, Moscow - 2002, page 77-85 Printing house of the Military Technical School of the Armed Forces of the Russian Federation.
- "Features of the preparation and conduct of specific operations of the 40th Army" (from the experience of military operations in Afghanistan). Typography of the Armed Forces of the Armed Forces of the Russian Federation, Colonel-General Barynkin VM, Doctor of Military Sciences, Professor. Monograph. Russian Aeronautical Society (Military Department) Moscow, 1999
- «Military-Historical Journal» of the Ministry of Defense of the Russian Federation, issues 1-6 p. 51, excerpts about the operation "The Trap"
- The army collection ID. Daudi Operation Westland. "From the Chronicle of the Combat Route of the Soviet Forces in the Republic of Afghanistan" 2016.08. p. 88-92
- "Mohammad Ismail Khan" portal Afghanistan.ru.ru author of the historical sciences Kosimsho Iskandarov head of the department of history and research of regional conflicts of the Institute of Oriental Studies and written heritage of the Academy of Sciences of the Republic of Tajikistan
- "The Army Collection" magazine of the Ministry of Defense of the Russian Federation, extracts about the liquidation of the Kokari-Shashari base ("Kokari-Shushari"), issues 1-6 pp. 2005
- "Border Aviation in the Afghan War" Mikhail Zhirokhov
- "Russian history. Wars and Peace Treaties "by R. Bogatenko, K. Goryuchkin - 2018]
- THE AFGHAN DIARY
- Troop operation in the province of Herat (Afghanistan) 19-25.08.1986 TV show "Military Secret" No. 173 TC "Ren TV" 18.02.2013
- "The Truth about an undeclared war"
- "AFGAN: History of the War - 1986"
- Map of the Sharshari District
- Excerpt from Operation The Trap (1986) The book "Assault Aviation in the Afghan War" BULLETIN OF THE ACADEMY OF MILITARY SCIENCES No. 2 (23) / 2008 "PAGES OF MILITARY HISTORY" p / pk candidate of historical sciences V. I. Pupinin, "Assault aviation in the Afghan war", and "Lessons of the war in Afghanistan" A. A. Osipov " Proza.ru
- WARSAW OPERATION "WEST" to destroy the base-arsenal of the leader of the opposition of Turan Ismail Khan in the KOKARI-SHARSHARI area on the Iranian border
- Army, units of border troops (deployment in Afghanistan) "Main Combat Units and units of the 40th Army"
- "Wars and Military Conflicts (Afghanistan)" by Major-General E. G. Nikitenko Military Space Defense (VKO) Magazine
