= Daoudi =

Daoudi is a surname. Notable people with the surname include:

- El Almi Daoudi (born 1985), Algerian footballer
- Jalal Daoudi (born 1988), Moroccan footballer
- Lahcen Daoudi (born 1947), Moroccan politician
- Mohammed Dajani Daoudi (born 1946), Palestinian professor and peace activist
- Nabil Daoudi (born 1983), Moroccan footballer
- Rachid Daoudi (born 1966), Moroccan footballer
- Sana Daoudi (born 1998), Moroccan footballer
