= Kalurghat =

Coordinates: 22.39°N 91.87°E

Kalurghat (Bengali: কালুরঘাট) is located several miles north of the port city of Chittagong, Bangladesh, and is mostly famous for several heavy industries located there. A bridge near Kalurghat on the Karnaphuli River connects Chittagong city with the southern parts of the district.

Kalurghat is also the location of the radio transmitter where Major Ziaur Rahman declared the independence of Bangladesh during the Bangladesh Liberation War in 1971. Using a makeshift radio transmitter located in Kalurghat, first M A Hannan on 26 March 1971 afternoon, and later on 26 March 1971 evening Ziaur Rahman, an army major then, and President of Bangladesh much later, declared the Independence of Bangladesh, on behalf of the Father of the Nation Bangabandhu Sheikh Mujibur Rahman.

== The first declaration ==
A translation into English of the first declaration of independence by M A Hannan on 26 March 1971 is given below:

Today Bangladesh is a sovereign and independent country. On Thursday night West Pakistani armed forces suddenly attacked the police barracks at Razarbagh and the EPR headquarters at Pilkhana in Dhaka. Many innocent and unarmed have been killed in Dhaka city and other places of Bangladesh. Violent clashes between EPR and Police on the one hand and the armed forces of Pindi on the other, are going on. The Bengalis are fighting the enemy with great courage for an independent Bangladesh. May God aid us in our fight for freedom. Joy Bangla.

== Zia's declaration ==
Major Ziaur Rahman's opening words in Bengali, "Ami Major Zia Bolchi", that is, "I am Major Zia speaking", were picked up by news agencies, and were given wide publicity across the globe. Ami Major Zia Bolchi were followed by declaration of a sovereign and independent Bangladesh at 26 March 1971 evening, in these words:

This is Swadhin Bangla Betar Kendra. I, Major Ziaur Rahman, do hereby declare that Independent People's Republic of Bangladesh has been established. On the circumstances, I have taken the command as the temporary Head of the Republic. I call upon all Bengalees to rise against the attack by the West Pakistani Army. We shall fight to the last to free our motherland. Victory is, by the Grace of Allah, ours. Joy Bangla.

After 27 March he also included the name of Bangabandhu Sheikh Mujibur Rahman in this declaration.

== Industries ==
Kalurghat area holds several major heavy and light industries, namely:

- Unilever Bangladesh Limited
- Berger Paints Bangladesh Limited
- Transcom Beverages Limited
- Gazi Wires Limited
- Usmania Glass Sheet Factory Limited
