= M. A. Hannan =

Bangladeshi politician (1930–1974)

- মোহাম্মদ আব্দুল হান্নান
- Born: Mohammad Abdul Hannan; 10 February 1930
- Died: 12 June 1974 (aged 44); Feni District, Bangladesh
- Occupation: Politician
- Political party: Bangladesh Awami League

Mohammad Abdul Hannan (February 10, 1930 – June 12, 1974) was a Bangladeshi politician and the first person to broadcast the Bangladeshi Declaration of Independence.

== Early life ==
Mohammad Abdul Hannan born in Tehat, West Bengal on 10 February 1930. His father was Maulana Muhammad Muhibur Rahman, who was a Congress politician who later joined the Muslim League. He and his family migrated to East Bengal, Pakistan. They took up residence in Amjhupi, Meherpur, Kushtia district. He graduated from Dariapur High School in 1949 in Meherpur and later went to Kushtia College. He got his BA from Jagannath College. During his studies he took part in the Bengali language movement of 1952. He also studied at Government City College, Chattogram.

== Career ==
He worked in Chartered Bank and Alfa Insurance Company. In 1964 he joined the Awami league in Chittagong. In 1966 he was involved in the six-point programme and in 1968 the movement against the Agartala Conspiracy Case. He was elected to organizing secretary and later general secretary of Chittagong district unit of Awami League. On 24 March 1971 he tried to prevent the off loading of weapons in Chittagong port by Pakistan army. He was the 2nd person to broadcast Sheikh Mujibur Rahman's declaration of independence on the Independent Bangladesh Radio Station in the afternoon of 26 March 1971 (as the first person was a technician of East Pakistan Radio Station). After the Independence of Bangladesh, he was the vice-president of the central committee of Bangladesh Jatiya Sramik League and the president of Bangladesh Rail Sramik League and Jatiya Sramik League.

== Death and legacy ==
He died in Chauddagram on 12 June 1974 from his injuries after being a car accident the day before.

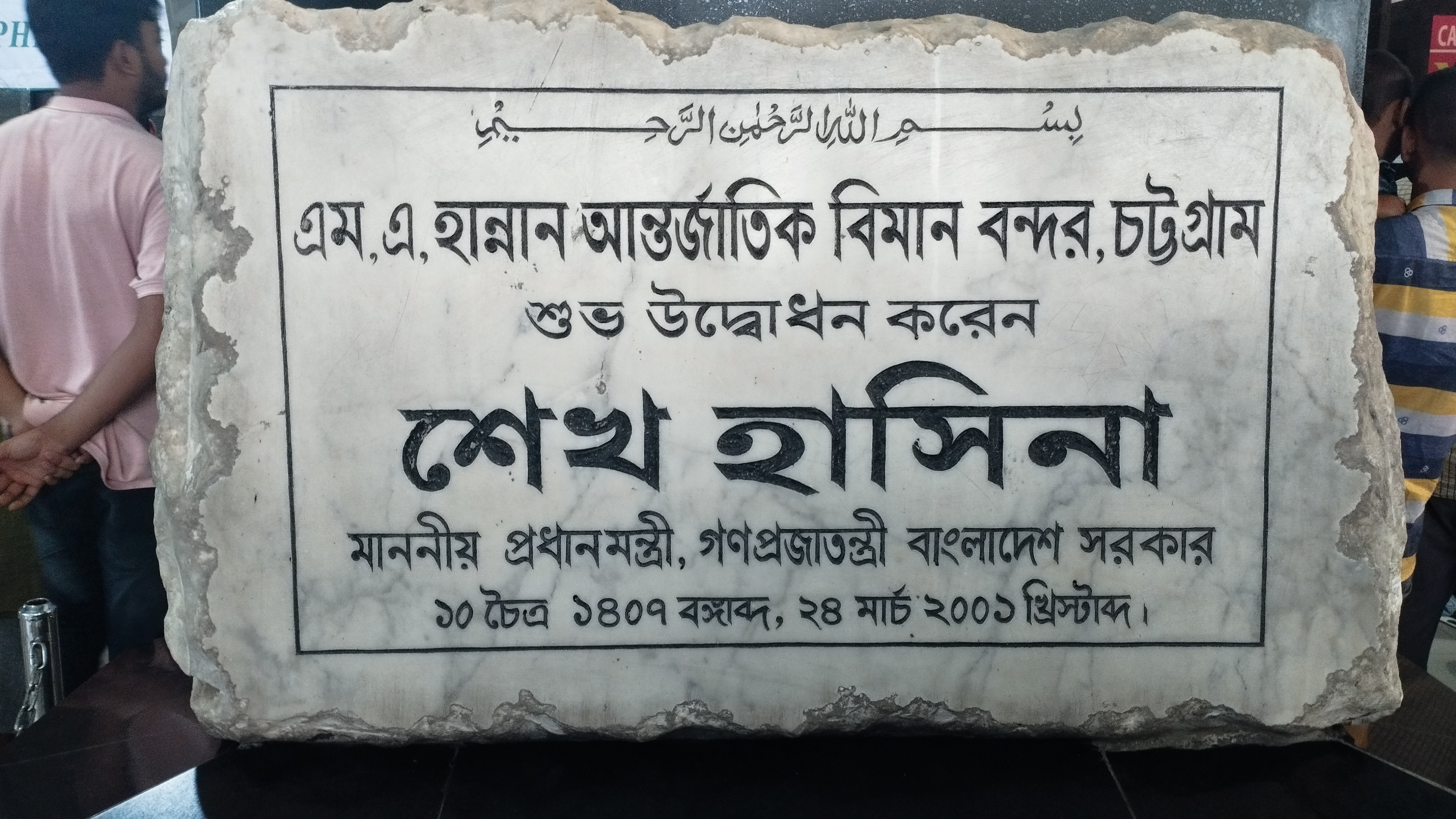
Inauguration plaque of M.A Hannan Airport, Chattogram

During the rule of the Bangladesh Awami League government (1996–2001), Chittagong International Airport was named M. A. Hannan International Airport. However, the airport was renamed as Shah Amanat International Airport after the Bangladesh Nationalist Party led alliance came to power in 2002.
