= Melaghar Camp =

Bangladeshi guerrilla training camp

Melaghar Camp was a training camp for Bengali guerrilla fighters during the Bangladesh Liberation War. In a cabinet meeting of the Provisional Government of Bangladesh, held on July 11, 1971, the Bangladesh Forces were divided into eleven sectors. Melaghar, near Agartala, India, was the headquarters of sector two.

== Sector information ==
The sector Commander of sector two in Melaghar camp was Major Khaled Musarraf (late Maj Gen Khaled Mosharraf Bir Uttam) till October 21, 1971 and then Captain A T M Hyder (late Lt Col ATM Haider Bir Uttam psc) from October 22 to December. A brigade named "K-Force" was formed in Melaghar camp by Major Khaled Musharraf along with A. T. M. Hyder in September, 1971 and consisted of 4, 9 and 10 East Bengal Regiments. The fighters from this camp fought against the Pakistan Army in the eastern part of Faridpur, Noakhali, part of Comilla and Dhaka city.

The first guerrilla unit under K Force was developed here to attack the Pakistan Army in Dhaka.

== Surroundings and life in Melaghar Camp ==
Melaghar camp ranged a few miles. Hills, jungles surrounded the area. The earthen path to camp was uneven and a little rain could make it slippery.

Guerrilla fighters from several districts came to Melaghar camp for training. But most of the trainees in this camp were from Dhaka. The brief training program for each group of fighters lasted hardly 15 days. Each night, two or three groups of guerrillas used to enter a certain region of their country with ammunition to fight against the Pakistani army.

Life was rigorous. The fighters trained two times a day. There was a very limited supply of food, water and medication in the camp.
