= Swadhin Bangla Betar Kendra =

Radio broadcasting centre of Bengali nationalist forces during the Bangladesh War

- Chittagong; Bangladesh
- Broadcast area: Bangladesh & India

Programming
- Language: Bengali
- Format: Mixed
- Affiliations: Mukti Bahini

Ownership
- Owner: Provisional Government of Bangladesh

History
- First air date: 3 April 1971
- Last air date: 6 December 1971

Swadhin Bangla Betar Kendra (Bengali: স্বাধীন বাংলা বেতার কেন্দ্র, lit. 'Free Bengal Radio Centre') was the radio broadcasting centre of Bengali nationalist forces during the Bangladesh War in 1971. The station played an important role in broadcasting the Declaration of Independence and increasing the morale of Bangladeshis during the brutal attack in 1971. During this time, radio was the only medium able to reach the far ends of Bangladesh. The station ran a campaign throughout the independence war.

Giving tunes, and taking records at every moment. Music expert Altaf Mahmud helped the fighters in different ways. The guerrilla fighters would often visit his home and store weapons there. At one stage, he was taken captive by the Pakistanis and tortured in a torture cell where he was martyred. Abdul Ahad rejected the prize awarded by the Pakistani government as a gesture of protest against the then Pakistani government. The Bangladeshi artists Mukti Sangrami Shilpi Sangstha, Bangabandhu Shilpigosthi, and Swadhin Bangla Muktijoddha Sangskritik Sangha encouraged the people, including fighters with their songs. Additionally, many singers played a vital role in the War of Independence with their merit, creativity, and hard work.

== Background ==
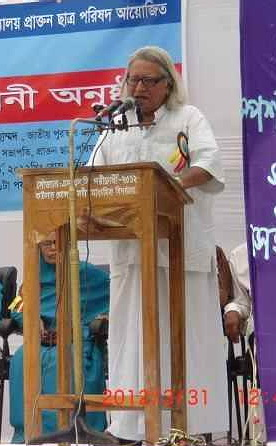
Belal Muhammad, one of the founders of Swadhin Bangla Betar Kendra, at a conference in Sandwip, 2008

The end of British rule in India in August 1947, accompanied by the Partition of India, gave birth to a new country named Pakistan which constituted Muslim-majority areas in the far east and far west of the Indian subcontinent. The Western zone was popularly (and for a period of time, also officially) termed West Pakistan and the Eastern zone (modern-day Bangladesh) was initially termed East Bengal and later, East Pakistan. The two zones were separated by over thousand miles of Indian territory in the middle, and had vastly different cultures. It was widely perceived that the west zone dominated the country, leading to the effective marginalization of the east zone. Growing disenchantment among the people of East Pakistan finally led to civil disobedience followed by the Bangladesh War in 1971.

During the period of War of Bangladesh, media supported mass sentiments. They aired patriotic songs and talk shows. In the process of achieving Bangladesh's independence by trouncing the atrocities of the Pakistani military forces, the war-time broadcasting station "Shadheen Bangla Betar Kendra" played a vital role in increasing the morale of Bangladeshis by informing them of how they were advancing towards victory. Shadheen Bangla Betar Kendra reached its pinnacle during the war being acclaimed as the stool pigeon of war news updates through 'Chorom Potro'. In those days when radio was the only media reaching the far ends of Bangladesh, Swadhin Bangla Betar Kendra eventually turned as the orator of the Bangladesh government in exile. It ran the nationalist campaign throughout the war to gear up fighters' morale and mobilize world opinion in favor of Bangladesh.

== Formation ==
On 26 March 1971, just the day after the Operation Searchlight crackdown, when the brutal mass carnage by the Pakistani invaders plunged the nation into gloom and despair, at that critical juncture of history a voice was heard over the Radio saying "Swadhin Bangla Biplobi Betar Kendra Theke Ami Major Zia Balchhi". With that broadcast, the entire nation got back its confidence, courage of conviction, and strong optimism. It was all possible because of the initiative three young individuals took Dr. Syed Anwar Ali, Engineer Ashikul Islam and Engineer Dilip Chandra Das to start with 10 KW transmitter. Since then, during the whole period of Independence War, Swadhin Bangla Betar Kendra successfully carried out its intellectual war like an organized front and aired patriotic songs that greatly inspired the fighters in their relentless fight against the Pakistan-led occupation forces, war news, and talk shows to boost up people's spirits.

In the afternoon of 26 March 1971, a telegram containing the message of Sheikh Mujibur Rahman reached to Syed Anwar Ali through some students in Chittagong. The message was translated to Bengali by Dr. Syed Anwar Ali's wife Dr. Manjula Anwar. She along with Syed Anwar Ali, Kazi Hosne Ara and two WAPDA engineers Mr. Ashikul Islam and Mr. Dilip Chandra Das to broadcast that message decided to cross over the Kalurghat Bridge to reach the local transmission centre controlled by the Bengali soldiers of the 8th East Bengal Regiment under Major Ziaur Rahman. Bengali soldiers guarded the station as engineers prepared for transmission. As contact could not be established between the political leaders Major Ziaur Rahman was requested to broadcast the message. At 7:45 pm on 27 March 1971, Major Ziaur Rahman broadcast the message which became historic as the declaration of independence on behalf of Sheikh Mujibur Rahman.

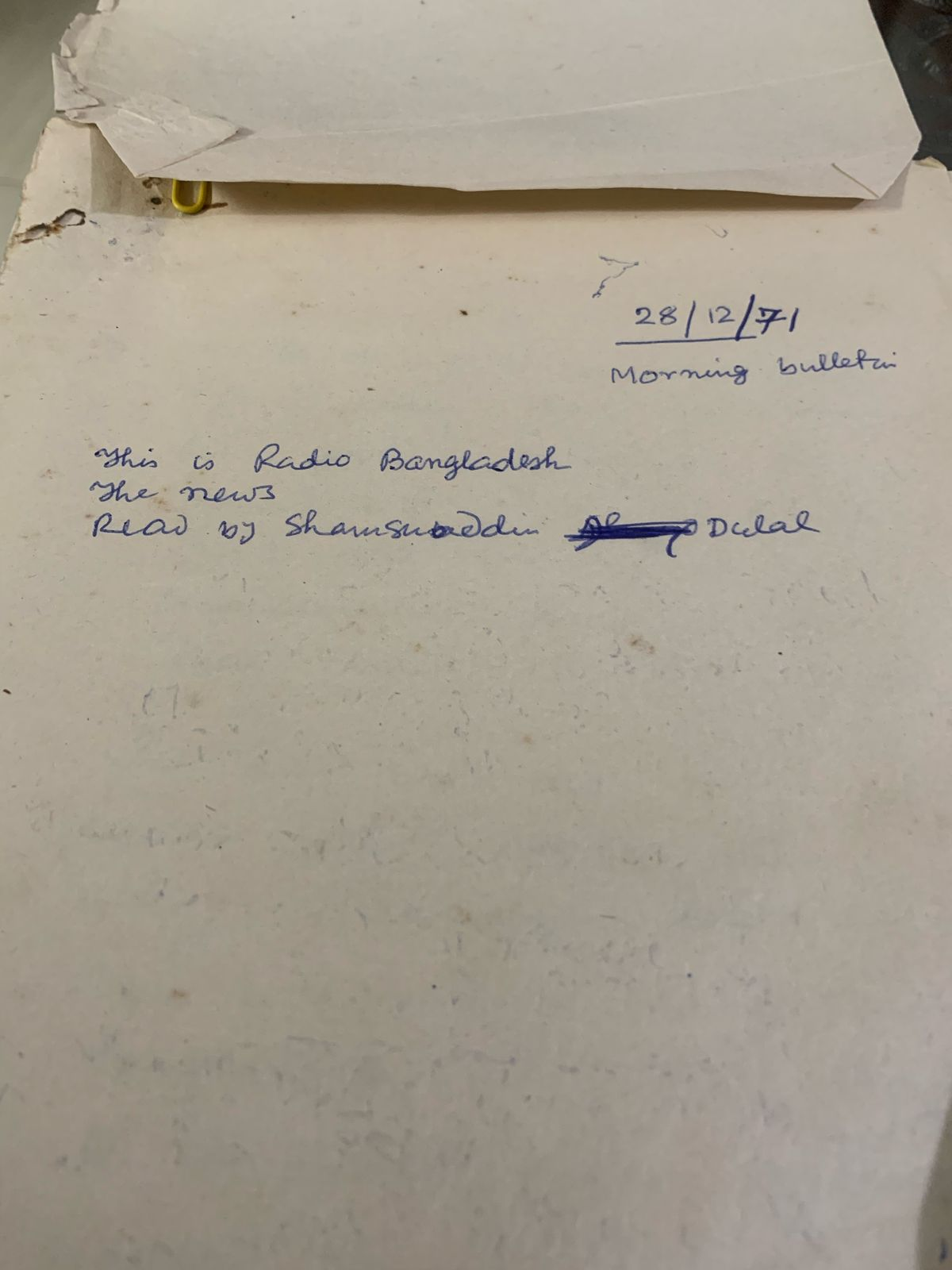
Front-page of the Morning Bulletin of Swadhin Bangla Betar Kendro on 28 December 1971

The Kalurghat Radio Station's transmission capability was limited. The message was picked up by a Japanese ship in Bay of Bengal. It was then re-transmitted by Radio Australia and later by the BBC. It ran for 5 days as Pakistan Air Force bombed and damaged it on 30 March. Ten founding members broke up into two groups and went to Agartala and Tripura with a 1 kilowatt transmitter. On 3 April, they restarted the broadcasting from Bagapha of Tripura and later moved to Agartala. The name was changed to Bangladesh Betar on 6 December 1971 after India gave recognition to Bangladesh as a sovereign country. Bangladesh Betar started broadcasting in independent country on 22 December 1971. With profound appreciation, the nation will always remember the services of those ten individuals who included Belal Muhammad, Syed Abdus Shaker, Mustafa Monwar, Abdullah Al Faruque, Abul Quasem Shandeep, Aminur Rahman, Rashedul Hossain, A.M. Sharfuzzaman, Kazi Habib Uddin Moni and Rezaul Karim Chowdhury.

== Declaration of Independence ==
Mujib was arrested on the night of 25–26 March 1971 at about 1:30 am (as per Radio Pakistan's news on 29 March 1971).

This is Swadhin Bangla Betar Kendra. I, Major Ziaur Rahman, at the direction of Bangabandhu Sheikh Mujibur Rahman, hereby declare that the Independent People's Republic of Bangladesh has been established. At his direction, I have taken the command as the temporary Head of the Republic. In the name of Sheikh Mujibur Rahman, I call upon all Bengalees to rise against the attack by the West Pakistani Army. We shall fight to the last to free our motherland. Victory is, by the Grace of Allah, ours. Joy Bangla.

This was the story (described to the Press Trust of India-PTI's East Pakistan correspondent journalist Jyoti Sen Gupta in 1971 by Prof. Md. Khaled, Awami League vice-president of Chittagong, Belal Muhammad, Pakistan Radio rebel and others who took part in Chittagong revolution in March 1971) of the birth of independent Bangladesh in a small room in the radio transmitter center at the industrial township, Kalurghat skirting Chittagong where Surya Sen with a handful of revolutionaries had 40 years ago challenged the mighty British Government by armed attack on its armory.

Major Zia's message was heard by a few sub-editors and reporters in news offices in Dacca while tuning in to different stations for news of their own country. Those days they were cut off from free news circulation and were forced to bring out their papers with press notes and hand-outs given by the Martial Law Authorities. Newspapers had no authority to use any news broadcast by radio systems of countries other than Pakistan.

Major Zia's message was picked up by a Japanese ship anchored mid-stream in Chittagong harbour. When the news of this declaration was broadcast by Radio Australia, the rest of the world came to know of it. Inside Bangladesh those who heard Radio Australia passed on the news of the historic declaration in whispers to friends, neighbours and strangers. Major Zia's call had an immediate response; the EBR, EPR and the regular police forces rose in revolt in every town and border outpost.

The Pakistan Government authorities made futile attempts to tell the people that the broadcast was made by a clandestine radio from a ship in the mouth of river Hooghly in India. Islamabad even sent a note of protest also to New Delhi. The strength of the Bengali revolutionary forces at Kalurghat went on swelling as people fleeing from the besieged city of Chittagong collected there. The greatest contribution towards increasing the strength came from the student community who drafted many to join up and fight.

M A Hannan, an Awami League leader from Chittagong, is said to have made the first announcement of the declaration of independence over the radio on 26 March 1971. There is a controversy now as to when Major Zia gave his speech. pro-BNP sources maintain that it was 26 March, and there was no message regarding declaration of independence from Mujibur Rahman. Pakistani sources, like Maj. Gen. Fazal Muqeem Khan in his book Pakistan's Crisis in Leadership, Brigadier Zahir Alam Khan in his book The Way It Was and Lt. Gen. Kamal Matinuddin in his book Tragedy of Errors: East Pakistan Crisis, 1968-1971 had written that they heard Major Zia's speech on 26 March 1971, but Maj. Gen. Hakeem A. Qureshi in his book The 1971 Indo-Pak War: A Soldier's Narrative gives the date of Major Zia's speech as 27 March 1971.

== Regular features ==
Chorompotro was the most popular program hosted by M. R. Akhtar Mukul. Here, he used to describe the uncomfortable position of Pak army in a funny voice and made his dialogues in Old Dhaka dialect. Chorompotro was planned by Abdul Mannan. Another popular program Jallader Darbar was run by Kalyan Mitra where approaches of Yahya Khan, known in the program as "Kella Fateh Khan" were described in a funny manner. "Bojro Kontho" was the program where speech of Sheikh Mujibur Rahman were presented. A group of young singers used to sing inspiring songs. Many poems and songs were written for this broadcasting. One of those songs Joy Bangla Banglar Joy (Victory of Bengal) was the signature tune of the radio. Many songs of Swadhin Bangla Betar Kendra like Purbo Digante Surjo Uthechhe, Ekti Phoolke Bachabo Bole, Salam Salam Hajar Salam of Gobinda Haldar, became immensely popular. Singers of the station raised funds singing their songs in different parts of West Bengal. News broadcasts were made in Bengali, English and Urdu. Secretary of the Swadhin Bangla Betar Convener Committee Kamal Lohani recalled, For us at the radio, it was a psychological warfare so we could say things to boost up people's morale.

== Performers ==
Apart from M.R. Akhtar Mukul, the other prominent performers of the radio were:

- Kamal Lohani - Head of News
- M. R. Akhter Mukul - Chorompotro
- Rokeya Haider - News in English
- Babul Akhtar - News in Bengali
- Abdul Jabbar Khan - Director, drama
- Samar Das - Music director and composer
- Ajit Roy - Music director and composer
- Shujeo Shyam - Music director and singer
- Apel Mahmud - Singer
- Amitava Sengupta - Singer
- Manjula Dasgupta - Singer
- Abdul Jabbar - Singer
- Mala Khan - Singer
- Rupa Khan - Singer
- Rafiqul Alam - Singer
- Kaderi Kibria - Singer
- Lucky Akhand - Singer
- Jahangir Hayat Khan - Musician
- Mohammad Shah - Recitation from Puthi (Bengali folk rhymes)
- Nasimul Quader Chowdhury - News
- Zahid Siddique - Head of Urdu News, Script, Kothika writer
- Mihir Kumar Nandi - Singer
- Sk. Foysal Islam - English news reader, Bangladesh Betar, Khulna
- Subhash Dutta
- Timir Nandi - Singer
- Fakir Alamgir - Singer
- Sumita Devi
- Dalia Nausheen - Singer
- Bulbul Mahalanobish - Singer and voice actress as the role of Yahya Khan's wife at Jallader Darbar

== Legacy ==
As of 2017, total 253 radio artistes have been accorded the "Freedom Fighter" statuses by the Government of Bangladesh.
