= Akhand Bharat =

Concept of unified Greater India

A map of Akhand Bharat

Akhand Bharat (transl. Undivided India), also known as Akhand Hindustan, is a term for the irredentist concept of a greater unified India along with part of Southeast Asia. It asserts that modern-day Afghanistan, Bangladesh, Bhutan, India, Maldives, Myanmar, Nepal, Pakistan, Sri Lanka, and Tibet are one nation. It is associated with Hindutva ideology.

== History ==
During the Indian independence movement, Kanaiyalal Maneklal Munshi advocated for Akhand Hindustan, a proposition that Mahatma Gandhi agreed with, believing that as Britain wanted to retain their empire by pursuing a policy of divide and rule, Hindu–Muslim unity could not be achieved as long as the British were there. However, in relation to Myanmar (then Burma), Gandhi felt that it should be separate from India, regarding its inclusion in British India as a purely British legacy. In addition, Mazhar Ali Khan wrote that "the Khan brothers [were] determined to fight for Akhand Hindustan, and challenged the League to fight the issue out before the electorate of the Province." On 7–8 October 1944, in Delhi, Radha Kumud Mukherjee presided over the Akhand Hindustan Leaders' Conference.

== Contemporary usage ==
The call for creation of the Akhand Bharat or Akhand Hindustan has been raised by Hindutva organisations such as the Hindu Mahasabha, Rashtriya Swayamsevak Sangh (RSS), Vishva Hindu Parishad (VHP), Shiv Sena, the Maharashtra Navnirman Sena (MNS), the Hindu Sena, Hindu Janajagruti Samiti (HJS), the Bharatiya Janata Party (BJP), among others. One organisation sharing this goal, the Akhand Hindustan Morcha, bears the term in its name.

Pre-1947 maps of India, showing the modern states of Pakistan and Bangladesh as part of British India illustrate the borders of a proto-Akhand Bharat. The creation of an Akhand Bharat is also ideologically linked with the concept of Hindutva (a far-right Hindu nationalist ideology), as well as the ideas of sangathan (unity) and shuddhi (purification).

The first chapter of the Rashtriya Swayamsevak Sangh textbook for standard VII students at Akhil Bharatiya Sanskrit Gyan Pariksha included a map depicting Pakistan and Bangladesh, which along with post-partition India, were territories that were part of "Akhand Bharat" and a trade union magazine of the same organisation also included Nepal, Bhutan, and Myanmar.

While the leadership of the right-wing BJP wavers on the issue, the RSS has always been a strong proponent of the idea. RSS leader H. V. Seshadri's book The Tragic Story of Partition stresses the importance of the concept of Akhand Bharat. The RSS-affiliated magazine Organiser often publishes editorials by leaders such as the present Sarsanghachalak, Mohan Bhagwat, espousing the philosophy that only Akhand Bharat and sampoorna samaj (united society) can bring "real" freedom to the people of India. The call for Indian reunification has been supported by Indian Prime Minister Narendra Modi, and BJP National General Secretary Ram Madhav.

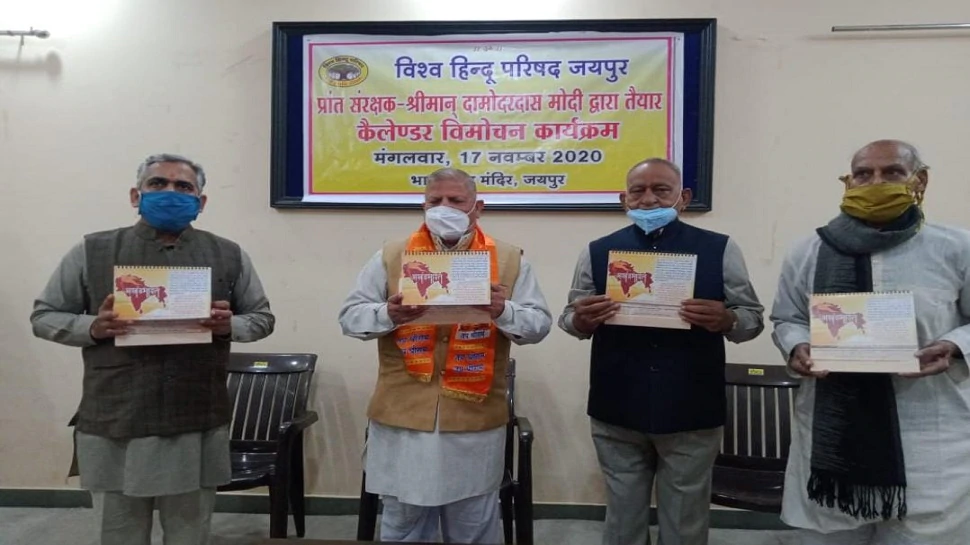
Akhand Bharat calendar released by RSS campaigners on 17 Nov, 2020 in Jaipur

In December 2015, following Modi's diplomatic visit to Lahore, Pakistan, the BJP National Secretary Ram Madhav (in an interview with Al Jazeera's Mehdi Hassan) described that "The RSS still believes that one day [India, Pakistan and Bangladesh], which have for historical reasons separated only 60 years ago, will again, through popular goodwill, come together and Akhand Bharat will be created." In March 2019, RSS leader Indresh Kumar claimed that Pakistan would reunite with India by 2025, that Indians would settle in and migrate to Lahore and Lake Mansarovar in Tibet, that an Indian-allied government had been ensured in Dhaka, and that a European Union-style Akhand Bharat would form.

Former Indian Supreme Court Judge Markandey Katju advocated in Pakistani newspaper The Nation that the only solution to the ongoing dispute between India and Pakistan is the reunification of India, Pakistan and Bangladesh under a strong, secular, modern-minded government. He expanded on the reasons for his support for a reunified India in an article for Newslaundry; Katju advocated that such a state would be administered by a secular government. Katju serves as the chairman of the Indian Reunification Association (IRA), which seeks to campaign for this cause. Former Indian Deputy Prime Minister L. K. Advani, in April 2004, similarly endorsed a confederation of the sovereign nations of India and Pakistan as a powerful geopolitical entity rivalling the European Union, United States of America, Russian Federation and People's Republic of China.

Hindutva political groups such as Shiv Sena have sought the reclamation of Pakistan-administered Kashmir under the pretence of Akhand Bharat, especially after the abrogation of Article 370 and 35A of the Indian constitution (removing the semi-autonomy of Jammu and Kashmir) in August 2019.

On 17 November 2020, the RSS campaigners released a calendar based on the "Akhand Bharat" theme. This calendar was prepared by the province patron of the Vishva Hindu Parishad in Jaipur.

In 2023, the unveiling of a mural in India's new parliament building, said to depict a map of the Maurya Empire under Ashoka, sparked controversy and criticism from several of India's neighbouring countries. Spokesperson for the Pakistani Ministry of Foreign Affairs, Mumtaz Zahra Baloch, criticised it as a "manifestation of a revisionist and expansionist mindset", while the Bangladeshi junior minister for foreign affairs stated "Anger is being expressed from various quarters over the map." Several Nepali politicians also expressed concern. While the spokesperson of the Indian Ministry of External Affairs, Arindam Bagchi, stated it symbolized "the idea of responsible and people-oriented governance that [Ashoka] adopted and propagated", other politicians in the ruling Bharatiya Janata Party declared it a symbol of Akhand Bharat, with Minister of Parliamentary Affairs Pralhad Joshi tweeting "The resolve is clear. Akhand Bharat".

== See also ==
- Greater India
- Indian Century
- Indian nationalism
- Hindu nationalism
- India–Pakistan Confederation
- Indian reunification
