= Arrest of Sheikh Mujibur Rahman =

1971 arrest of Bangladeshi statesman

- Part of Operation Searchlight
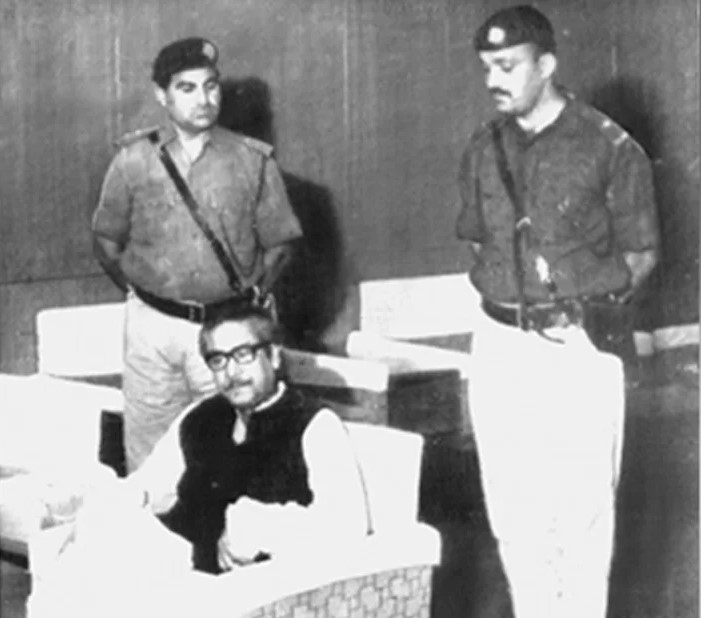
- Arrested Sheikh Mujibur Rahman at Karachi International Airport in April 1971
- Date: 26 March 1971
- Time: 01:30 (UTC+6)
- Duration: 9 months and 13 days
- Location: 677/32 Dhanmondi, New Dacca, East Pakistan, Pakistan (present-day New Dhaka, Bangladesh); 23.7517°N 90.3767°E
- Type: Arrest
- Cause: Non-cooperation movement
- Participants: Pakistan Army
- Outcome: Sheikh Mujibur Rahman was sent to jail in Lyallpur, Punjab
- Deaths: 1
- Arrests: Sheikh Mujibur Rahman
- Charges: Treason
- Trial: Secret military tribunal
- Verdict: Death sentence

At around 01:30 on 26 March 1971 (UTC+6), Sheikh Mujibur Rahman, the president of the All-Pakistan Awami League (AL) and the premier-elect in the 1970 Pakistani general election, was arrested by the Pakistan Army's Special Service Group from his private residence in Dacca, East Pakistan, Pakistan (present-day Dhaka, Bangladesh). The arrest operation was codenamed Operation Big Bird and occurred with Operation Searchlight. Following his arrest, Mujib was incarcerated in Lyallpur, and on 2 August, it was announced that he would be tried in a military tribunal behind closed doors. The tribunal brought charges of treason against him.

Immediately after Mujib's arrest, following a month-long non-cooperation movement, the Bangladesh Liberation War began, and the Provisional Government of Bangladesh was formed, declaring Mujib as its president. On 4 December, the military tribunal sentenced him to death, although the verdict was kept secret. However, before the sentence could be carried out, Bangladesh and India's joint Allied Forces launched an offensive into East Pakistan, leading to the surrender of the Pakistan Army in Dacca on 16 December. After the surrender, the government of Yahya Khan collapsed, and following the rise of Zulfikar Ali Bhutto as the new Pakistani president, Mujib was released on 8 January 1972.

== Background ==
=== Rise of Sheikh Mujibur Rahman ===
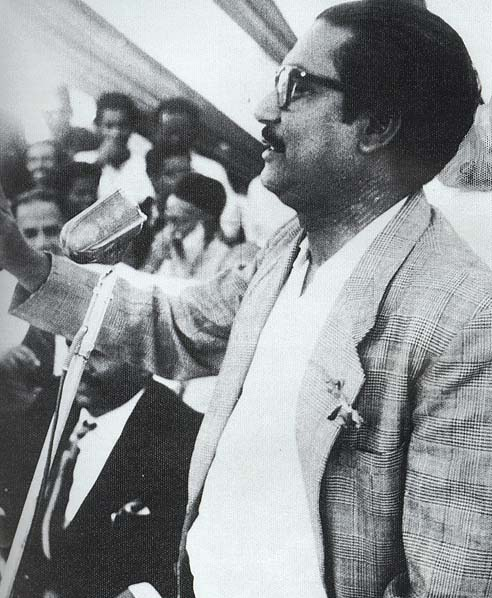
Sheikh Mujibur Rahman in Lahore, Pakistan, 1966.

Born in 1920 in Faridpur District, Bengal Presidency, British India, Sheikh Mujibur Rahman (Note: also known as "Bangabandhu" (lit. 'the friend of Bengal').) became a member of the Bengal Muslim Students' League in 1938 and joined the Bengal Provincial Muslim League in 1943. In 1947, British India's Bengal Province was divided into West Bengal and East Bengal, with East Bengal (later East Pakistan) becoming a province of Pakistan. During that time, Mujib was a student leader involved in the Pakistan Movement. He later joined the East Pakistan Awami League (EPAL) in 1949. After a split in 1957, party president Abdul Hamid Khan Bhashani left the party to form the National Awami Party (NAP), which led to Mujib emerging as the sole leader of the EPAL. Toward the end of the 1950s, he shifted his focus from national to provincial politics. In the early 1960s, he traveled to Agartala, capital of the Indian state of Tripura, with the intention of seeking independence for East Pakistan, though the mission was unsuccessful.

In 1966, at a political conference in West Pakistani capital Lahore, he presented the Six-point Resolution, which was met with strong opposition from the government, right-wing and left-wing parties, as well as China. The proposal called for restructuring Pakistan based on the Lahore Resolution, delegating all responsibilities except defense and foreign affairs to East and West Pakistan separately. In response, the a political movement gained momentum for Six-point Resolution in East Pakistan. However, in 1968, Mujib was arrested by the government of Pakistan on charges of conspiring to secede with Indian support and establish an independent state named Bangladesh. He was tried for treason in what became known as the Agartala Conspiracy Case. But due to massive public opposition in East Pakistan, the government was forced to withdraw the case. Following this, Mujib's party experienced a dramatic surge in popularity. According to declassified documents of British government, by 1969, they regarded Mujib as a promising political leader who could potentially become the next prime minister of Pakistan.

=== Elections and subsequent events ===
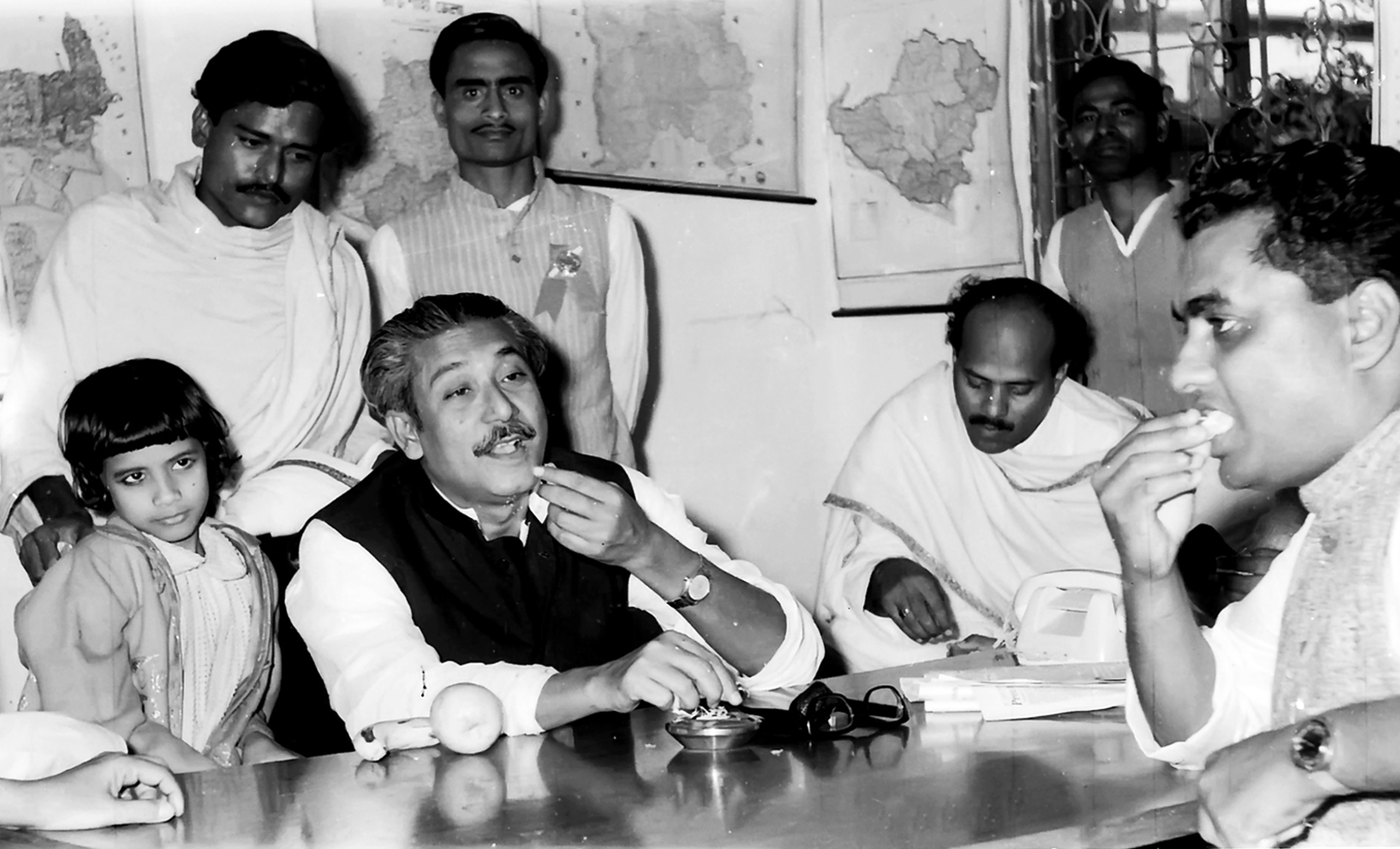
Sheikh Mujibur Rahman on the day of 1970 Pakistani general election.

In 1969, president Ayub Khan was forced to resign and handed over power to Yahya Khan. Upon assuming office, the new president Khan decided to hold national and provincial elections. Mujib became leader of the All-Pakistan Awami League (AL), who participated the election in the promise to implement Six-point Resolution. In the 1970 Pakistani general election, the AL secured an overwhelming majority. Almost all West Pakistan-based political parties were afraid to realize that the implementation of the six points was inevitable. Following the election results, political tensions intensified. Zulfikar Ali Bhutto, leader of the Pakistan Peoples Party (PPP), opposed transferring power to the AL. In such a situation, in February 1971, when Mujib sent a message through the regional general manager of Esso to Archer Blood, the U.S. Consul General in Dacca, East Pakistan (present-day Dhaka, Bangladesh), asking whether the United States would assist them if East Pakistan declared independence, Blood replied that they couldn't intervene in Pakistan's internal affairs. Later, Joseph S. Farland, the U.S. Ambassador to Pakistan, supported Blood's response. Afterwards, when Mujib, through a journalist, requested Blood to persuade president Khan either to implement the new constitution based on the Six Points or to transform Pakistan into a confederation ruled by a president, Blood rejected the proposal. According to a report published in the Indian magazine Organiser, a United States delegation led by Farland met with Mujib and proposed that the United States would support an AL-led government in Pakistan in exchange for handing over Sandwip Island in East Pakistan to the U.S. for a proposed naval base, which Mujib rejected.

A session of the National Assembly of Pakistan was scheduled for 3 March 1971, but two days before the session, Khan postponed it. This decision angered the East Pakistani people, leading to the launch of a widespread non-cooperation movement from 2 March. In 3 March, at Paltan Maidan in the presence of Mujib, Shajahan Siraj, general secretary of the East Pakistan Students' League, declared the "Manifesto of Bangladesh's Independence" under the banner of the All-Party Student Action Committee. Mujib was declared the supreme leader of the proposed state. In 6 March, Khan announced 25 March as the new date for the National Assembly session. By 15 March, Mujib informally assumed control of East Pakistan's governance. From 16 to 22 March, negotiations continued between Khan and Mujib over the transfer of power, but during this period, troops and supplies continued arriving from West Pakistan to East Pakistan. The assembly session was postponed again in 22 March. In 23 March, the AL proposed the Confederation of Pakistan, which called for the formulation of separate constitutions for East and West Pakistan. On the same day, the flag of Bangladesh was hoisted across East Pakistan in place of the flag of Pakistan, except in the President's House, Dacca Cantonment, Dacca Airport, and the Governor's House. Mujib formally hoisted the flag for the first time at his residence. The situation in East Pakistan was similar to the scenario of the mass uprising in 1969.

== The arrest ==
=== Preparations ===
Main targets of the Pakistan Army in Dacca during Operation Searchlight.

In March, India's foreign intelligence agency Research and Analysis Wing (RAW) alerted members of the AL about a possible plan to attack party officials, citing intelligence on the movement of troops and weapons from Karachi to Chittagong. Notably, Mujib had been imprisoned several times before 1971, spending approximately 4,394 days in jail. In 23 March, a unit of the Pakistan Army identified and surveyed Mujib's residence. On 24 March, the final order was issued to arrest Mujib. The mission to arrest him was code-named "Operation Big Bird". That afternoon, Mujib instructed several top leaders of his party to leave Dacca. In 25 March, rumors of a military operation in Dacca began to spread.

That evening, president Khan left East Pakistan. Lieutenant Colonel A.R. Chowdhury, a member of the presidential security team, informed Mujib about the president's departure. On the same day, Lieutenant General Tikka Khan instructed Major General Khadim Hussain Raja to carry out Operation Searchlight. The 3rd Commando Battalion of the Special Service Group was tasked with Mujib's arrest. Around 70 soldiers were assigned to this arrest operation. During Operation Searchlight, the code name "Myna" was used by the military to refer to Mujib.

At 20.00 (UTC+6), a message was sent from the Dacca Cantonment to Mujib's residence via a written note, warning of an imminent attack that night. Upon receiving reports of suspicious military activity, Mujib instructed party leaders and activists to flee. However, he chose to remain at his residence. At that time, armed attacks began across the city. Serajul Alam Khan of the East Pakistan Students' League sought and received Mujib's approval to declare independence on his behalf and to authorize pro-independence members of the military and law enforcement to resist. In addition, Tajuddin Ahmad, one of his party's prominent leaders, came to Mujib's residence and requested him to proclaim the independence of Bangladesh and to escape, which Mujib refused.

=== Operation Big Bird ===
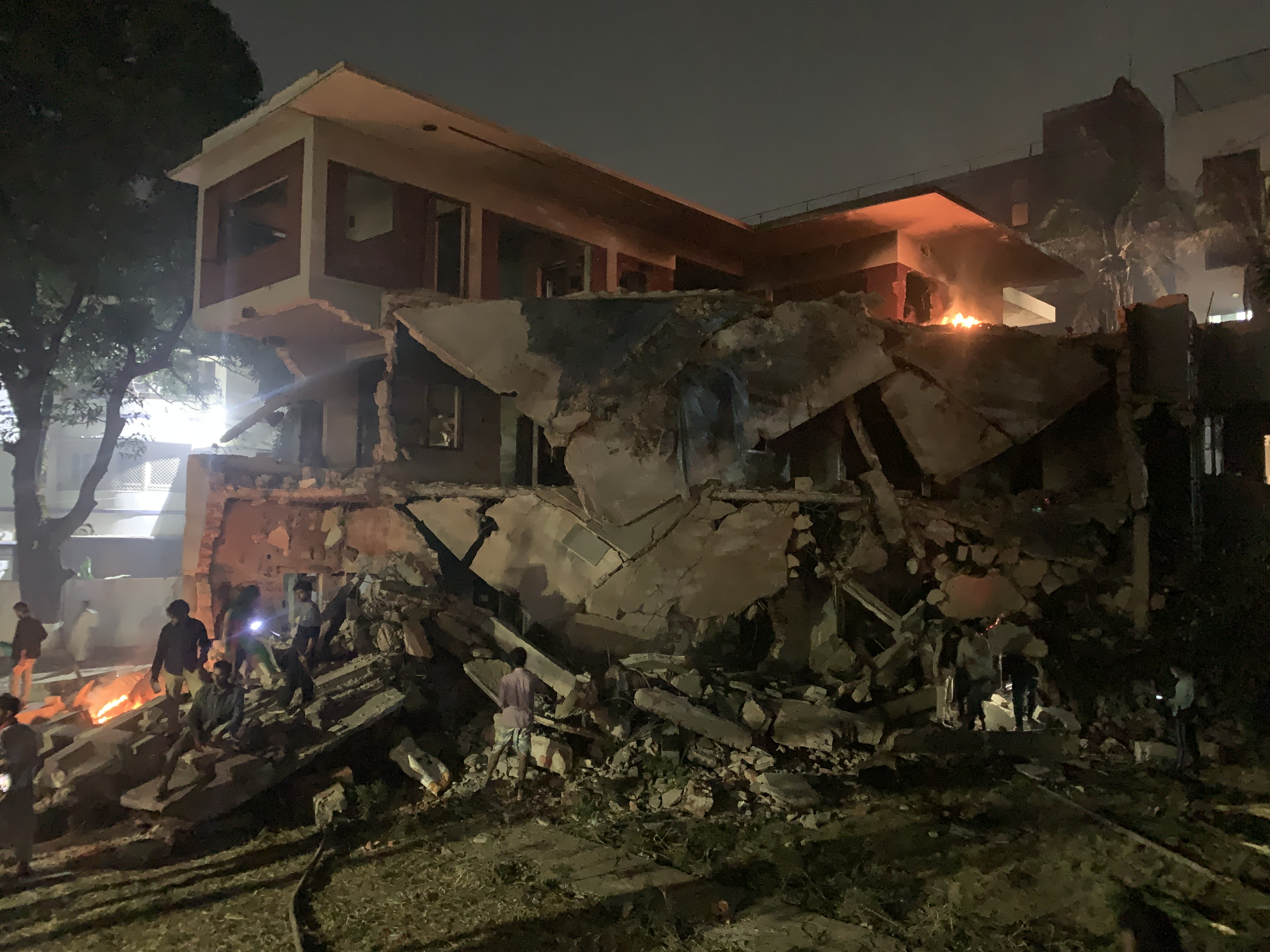
Ruins of Sheikh Mujibur Rahman's residence in 2024

In a 1972 interview, Mujib claimed that he had sent a message to Chittagong declaring independence at 22:30 before his arrest. (Note: There is controversy regarding who proclaimed the independence of Bangladesh.) After receiving news that Khan had reached Karachi, at around 23:30, the Pakistan Army's Eastern Command launched an assault on the headquarters of the East Pakistan Rifles before heading towards Mujib's residence. On their way, the military unit encountered civilians and barricades. According to United Press International, at 00:50 in 26 March, Mujib was still at his residence, and his telephone was active. There was a power outage in his area during the raid. At the time, in addition to Mujib, his wife Sheikh Fazilatunnesa Mujib, and two sons, Sheikh Jamal and Sheikh Russel, were present at the residence. (Note: His other son Sheikh Kamal and daughters Sheikh Hasina and Sheikh Rehana had left the house before Operation Searchlight.) At around 01:30, the military unit reached the residence and opened fire. In response, Mujib came out of the house and asked them to stop firing. He was then arrested by them. The arrest was reported to Tikka Khan via wireless communication. A night guard was killed during the shooting. After the arrest, another military unit arrived and vandalized the house to destroy it. Tikka later claimed that the arrest was kept secret to prevent any foreign power from aiding Mujib's escape.

After his arrest, Mujib was taken to the National Assembly building which was under construction, then moved to the 14th Division Officers' Mess of at the cantonment. On the same day, he was transferred to the Cantonment Girls' High School, located beside the residence of the General Officer Commanding, before being brought to the Command House. He was also held at the building of Adamjee Cantonment Public School. On 27 March, he was transferred to the Flag Staff House. That day, the government officially announced that Mujib had been arrested at 1:30 in 26 March. On 30 March, he was flown from Dacca to Karachi, and on 1 April, he was flown to Rawalpindi. On 10 April 1971, the government announced that Mujib was officially in detention. At that point, the government was still deciding on which prison he would be held. Following discussions, he was eventually taken to Lyallpur Jail in Punjab. Located 129 kilometers from Lahore, Lyallpur was one of the hottest regions in Pakistan, with a record high temperature of 37°C. Tikka claimed that he was compelled to arrest Mujib after hearing his proclamation of independence on a three-band radio. Finally, on 13 December, he was transferred by helicopter to the Mianwali Jail.

== Aftermath ==
=== In-camera trial ===
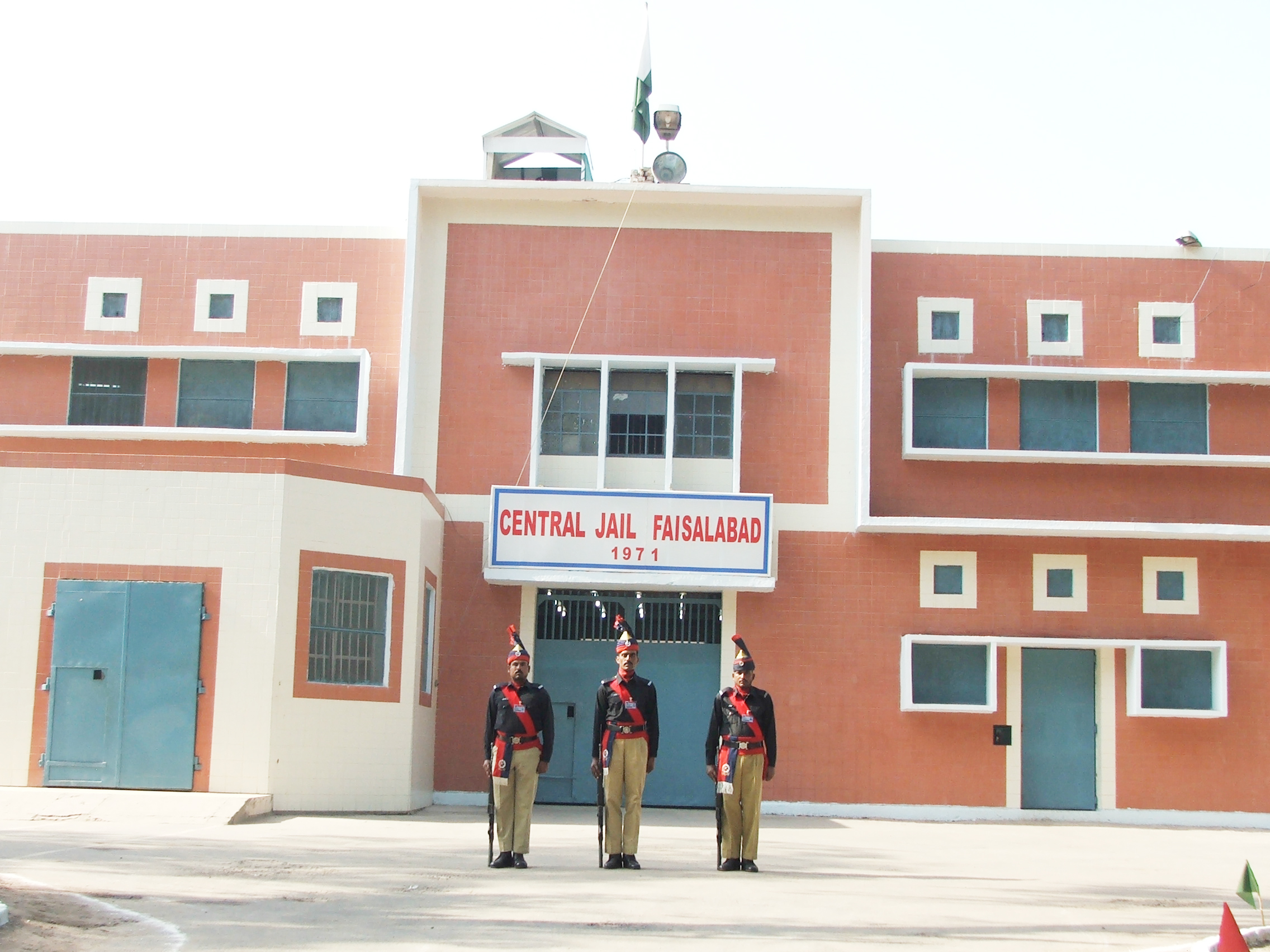
Faisalabad Central Jail (formerly Lyallpur Jail) in 2011, where Mujib was imprisoned

Radio Australia reported that at midnight on 26 March, president Khan expressed in a private conversation his intent to ensure the certain death of Mujib. On 19 July, Khan announced that Mujib would be tried in a secret military tribunal. On 2 August, the government declared that Mujib's trial would begin after nine days. One of the main charges against Mujib was declaring war against the state. In the White Paper on the crisis in East Pakistan published in August, the same charge of treason was brought against Mujib, although the allegation did not align with the reality. Because, according to the observation of the foreign journalists in East Pakistan, the AL had no serious plan to establish Bangladesh before 25 March. The trial of Mujib was decided to be held behind closed doors.

The military tribunal was led by Brigadier Rahimuddin Khan. From Bangladesh, Bernard Sheridan & Company was appointed to represent Mujib in court. However, the government of Pakistan did not allow them the opportunity to fight the case. The trial began on the scheduled date. However, the government announced later that it had been postponed that very day so that the accused could choose his own defense lawyer. In reality, the United States Department of State had advised the government of Pakistan to delay the proceedings with the aim of finding a solution to the East Pakistan crisis. On 18 August, the Provisional Government of Bangladesh, citing a Pakistani army officer sympathetic to Bangladesh, reported that when the Pakistani government issued a summons for Mujib to appear before the tribunal, he refused it, and at one point the government ordered Jumman Abadi, a special guard for Mujib, to kill him by poisoning his food and water, which Abadi refused to do. According to information, the army subsequently killed the special guard after news of the assassination attempt was leaked. On 19 August, Mujib was presented before the court for the first time. When allowed to appoint a defense lawyer, he requested his party's Kamal Hossain, but since that was not possible, (Note: In April 1971, Kamal Hossain was arrested by the Pakistani government.) he selected A. K. Brohi. As he was charged with sedition, Mujib decided not to defend himself during the proceedings. Meanwhile, the president hinted that the verdict would result in a death sentence.

Brohi wanted to cross-examine several individuals as witnesses on behalf of Mujib, including Justice Alvin Robert Cornelius, politician Abdul Hafeez Pirzada, and government official M. M. Ahmad, but the court rejected the request. The accused denied the charges brought against him. Anticipating the possible outcome of the trial, Mujib attempted to prolong the proceedings by non-cooperation. The government brought at least 50 witnesses against him. During the trial, his membership of National Assembly was not revoked. At the same time, as the situation in East Pakistan continued to deteriorate, the authorities were seen rushing to conclude the trial proceedings. On 4 December, after the trial concluded, the military court found Mujib guilty and sentenced him to death. However, the verdict was not officially announced. According to legal expert Subrata Roy Chowdhury, the entire trial process was illegal. Khan ordered a telegram to be sent instructing the prison authorities to carry out Mujib's execution.

=== Liberation War and the government-in-exile ===
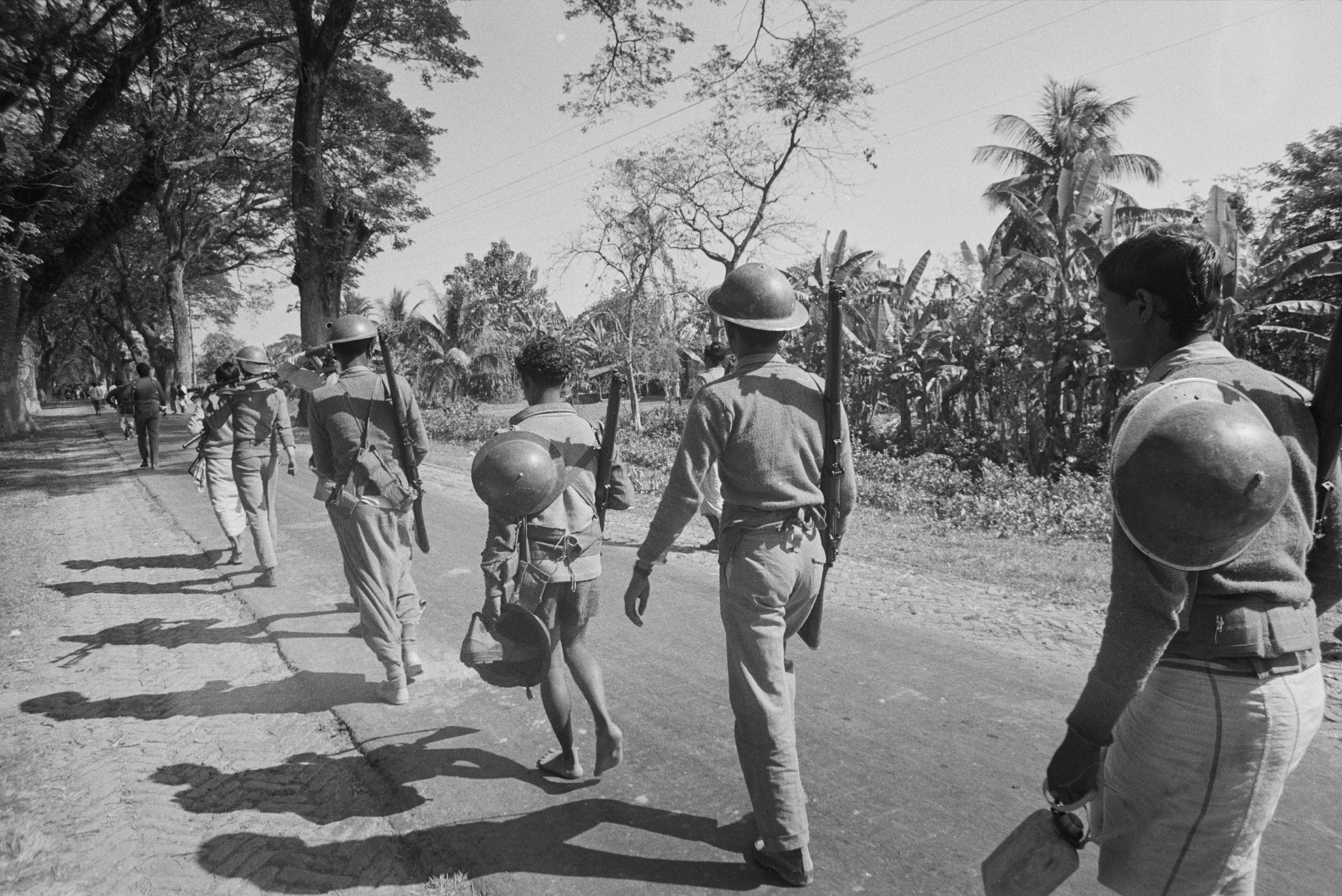
Allied Forces in Jessore District, December 1971

Operation Searchlight led to a planned genocide in East Pakistan. As a result of the genocide, at least 8 million people from East Pakistan fled and took refuge in India. The Bangladesh Liberation War began following the arrest of Sheikh Mujibur Rahman. On 26 March, in a broadcast on Radio Pakistan, the president accused Mujib and his party of treason. (Note: President Khan attributed the actions of Mujib and his party during the non-cooperation movement as a reason for his claim.) He also banned the AL. On the same day, through the radio station in Kalurghat, M. A. Hannan of the AL and Abul Kashem Sandwip, the initiator of the Independent Bengal Radio Station, broadcast the Proclamation of Bangladeshi Independence on behalf of Mujib. On 27 March, rebel Major Ziaur Rahman of the East Bengal Regiment declared independence in his own name over the radio. (Note: He later revised the proclamation under pressure in 30 March, announcing it in the name of Mujib.)

As a result, on 10 April, under the leadership of Tajuddin Ahmad, a provisional government was formed with the support of elected national and provincial assembly members, and the imprisoned Mujib was declared its president. After becoming prime minister, Ahmad took various initiatives to free the imprisoned president. In the first week of July, at the Siliguri conference, the AL was dissolved and EPAL was renamed as the Bangladesh Awami League (AL). However, Mujib's absence during this time did not hinder his influence over the war. In the international arena, he continued to be regarded as the central figure of Bangladesh Liberation War. On 3 December, the joint Allied Forces of Bangladesh and India entered East Pakistan and launched an attack. The next day, Ahmad in a letter to Indian prime minister Indira Gandhi requested recognition of Bangladesh as an independent state, as a result of which on 6 December India recognized Bangladesh. As a result, Pakistan surrendered on 16 December. From 18 December, the provisional government began operating from Dacca.

=== Reactions ===
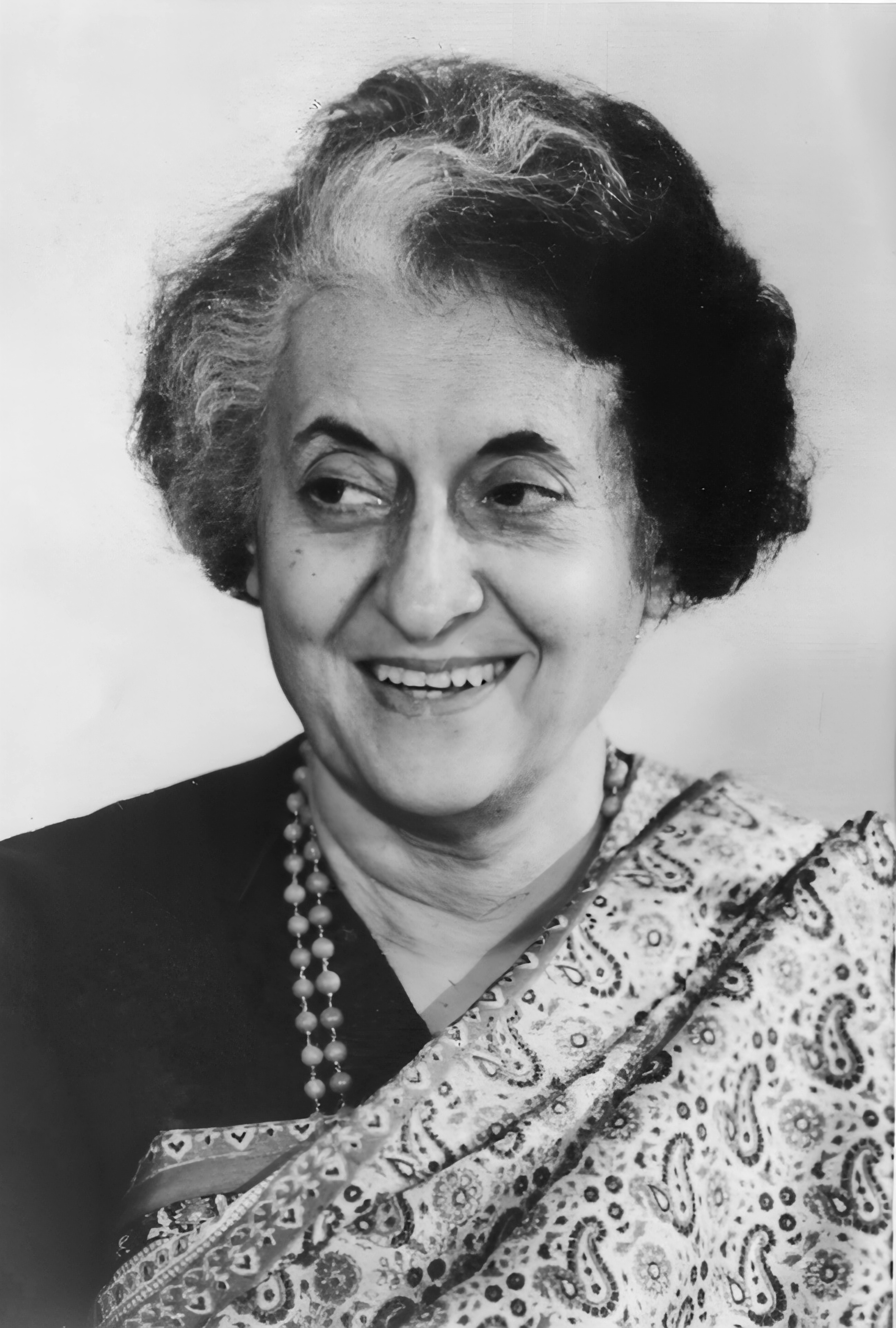
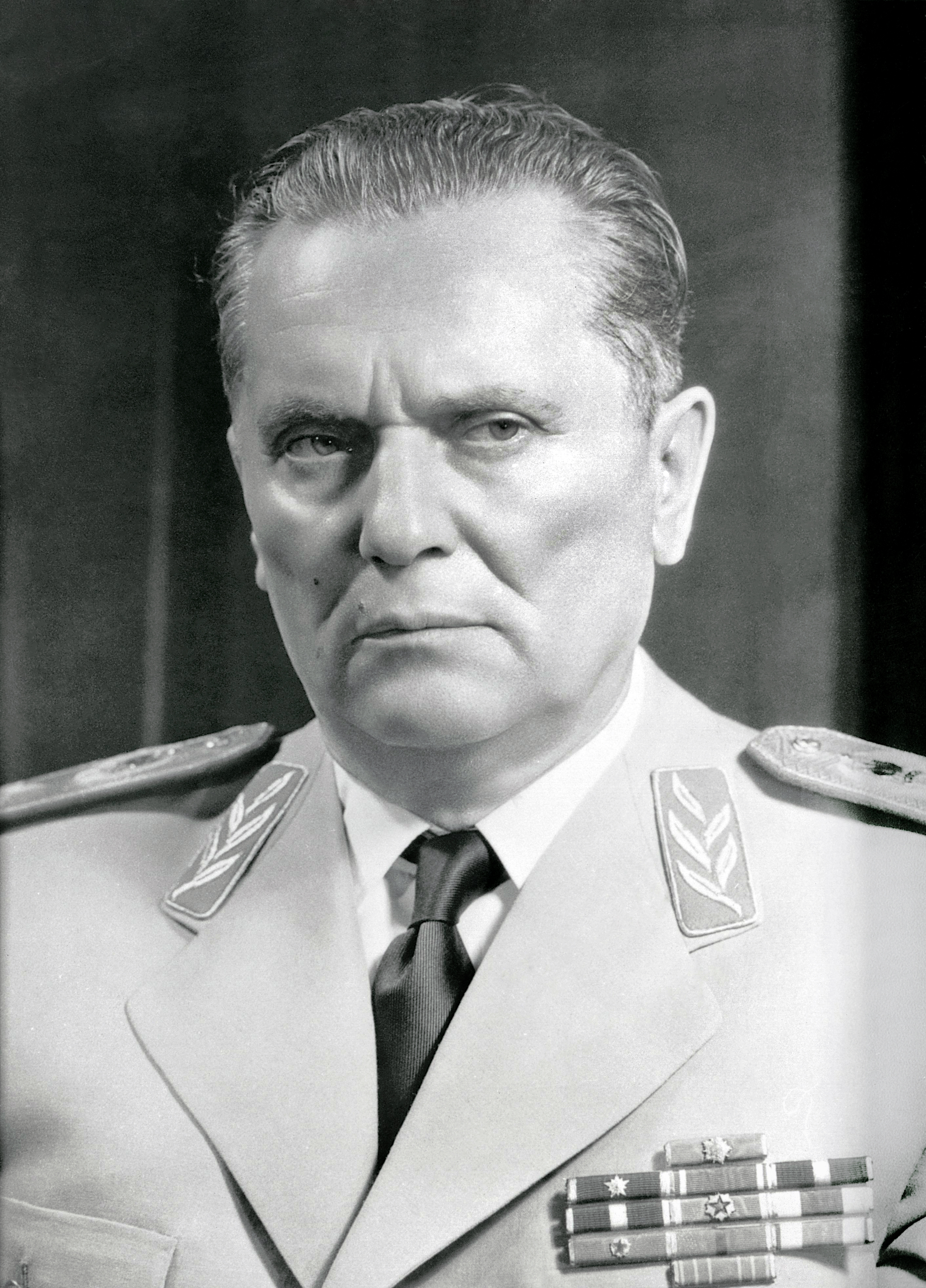
(From left) Indian Prime Minister Indira Gandhi, Soviet head of state Nikolai Podgorny, and Yugoslav President Josip Broz Tito.

In response to the news of Mujib's imprisonment, Abdul Hamid Khan Bhashani, chairman of the National Awami Party (Bhashani) (NAPB), expressed gratitude to God and said, "Allah will protect the country." On 2 April 1971, Nikolai Podgorny, the president of the Soviet Union, expressed concern in a letter to Khan regarding the arrest of Mujib. Within a few months of the arrest, former Pakistani president Ayub Khan sent two letters to the then president, advising him to save the country by reaching a settlement with Mujib through negotiations. In reaction to the decision to begin Mujib's trial, Indian foreign minister Swaran Singh warned Pakistan of serious consequences. In 8 August, Indian prime minister Gandhi called upon 24 countries to take action to save Mujib's life. In 10 August, Syed Nazrul Islam the acting president of the provisional government, expressed concern over the decision to try Mujib and called for intervention by the United Nations and Western countries. In 13 August, in a speech broadcast on the Independent Bengal Radio Station, Tajuddin Ahmad, prime minister of the provisional government, stated that an illegal president had no right to try Mujib, who had been elected by the people's mandate. In 20 October, Josip Broz Tito, president of Yugoslavia, stated that the release Mujib was crucial for peace and stability in the Indian subcontinent.

On 17 August, the International Commission of Jurists protested the decision of the Pakistani government. In 4 November, various professionals in Pakistan issued a joint statement demanding Mujib's release. Signatories included politician Asghar Khan, writer Faiz Ahmed Faiz, politician C. R. Aslam, journalist Mazhar Ali Khan, labor leader Mirza Ibrahim, and others. On the other hand, president Khan promised that he would release Mujib if Pakistan's people wanted it. In 11 August, a rally demanding Mujib's release was held in London's Hyde Park, attended by at least 15,000 people. In 13 August, around 5,000 intellectuals staged protests in front of the American and Soviet embassies in Calcutta (present-day Kolkata) demanding his release. In August, in letters sent to various newspapers, the Bangladesh League of America expressed concern that Mujib had possibly been killed before 31 March, as Pakistan Army had not presented any conclusive evidence of his existence. The letter claimed that the Mujib's photograph at Karachi International Airport published in newspapers had actually been taken before his arrest. The letter also claimed that he would undoubtedly be declared a traitor and sentenced to death by the military tribunal, since the president had already branded him a traitor. In 13 September, Arthur Bottomley, former Secretary of State of the United Kingdom, called on Commonwealth countries in Kuala Lumpur, Malaysia to pressure Pakistan for Mujib's release. In 5 October, the Soviet Afro-Asian Solidarity Committee labeled the trial of Mujib as a "farce".

== Outcome ==
=== Release ===
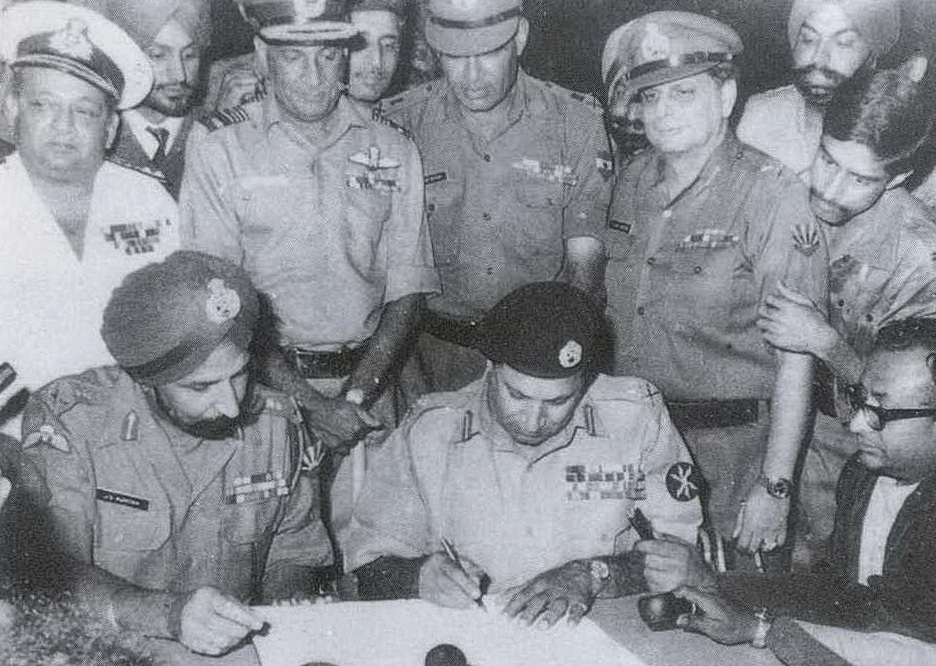
Surrender of the Pakistan Armed Forces in Dacca on 16 December 1971.

After Pakistan's defeat in the war, the issue of Mujib's release became a central topic of discussion, his popularity surged, and pressure on the Pakistani government to release him increased. In an interview with David Frost, Mujib claimed that Zulfikar Ali Bhutto told him that, before resigning, Khan had intended to forge a fake signed order with previous date for Mujib's execution. However, this plan was not carried out due to Bhutto's opposition. India's prime minister was interested in knowing the fate of Mujib. Therefore, Gandhi contacted Bhutto, who was in London on a stopover while en route by air to the United States before 18 December, through the wife of former East Pakistan's Chief Secretary Muzafar Husain. Bhutto told Husain's wife that Mujib would be released and that something would have to be given to India in return. On 20 December, following Khan's resignation, Bhutto became the new president of Pakistan. The next day, Bhutto announced that Mujib would be placed under house arrest as soon as possible. Earlier, in 15 December, some prison officials had spread a rumor among the inmates in Mianwali Jail that A. A. K. Niazi, Eastern Command's chief, had died in the war, in an attempt to incite them to kill Mujib, blaming him for the defeat. As a result, on the night of 16 December, Mujib was secretly moved out of the prison.

On 26 December, prison authorities secretly took Mujib to a guest house. The next day, Mujib met president Bhutto for the first time after his release in Chaklala. During that meeting, Bhutto proposed a confederation between the two countries modeled on the United Arab Republic, where foreign affairs, defense, and finance would remain joint matters. On 1 January 1972, Mujib was taken to a bungalow in Sihala, where he met Bhutto again. At Mujib's request, Bhutto arranged for Kamal Hossain to be released from the Jail in Haripur to meet with him. After multiple meetings with Mujib, Bhutto agreed to release him. On 5 January, a public rally held in Karachi showed support for Mujib's release, which finalized the decision. On 7 January, when Bhutto reminded him about the talks, Mujib asked him to keep the matter secret and to wait.

=== Homecoming ===
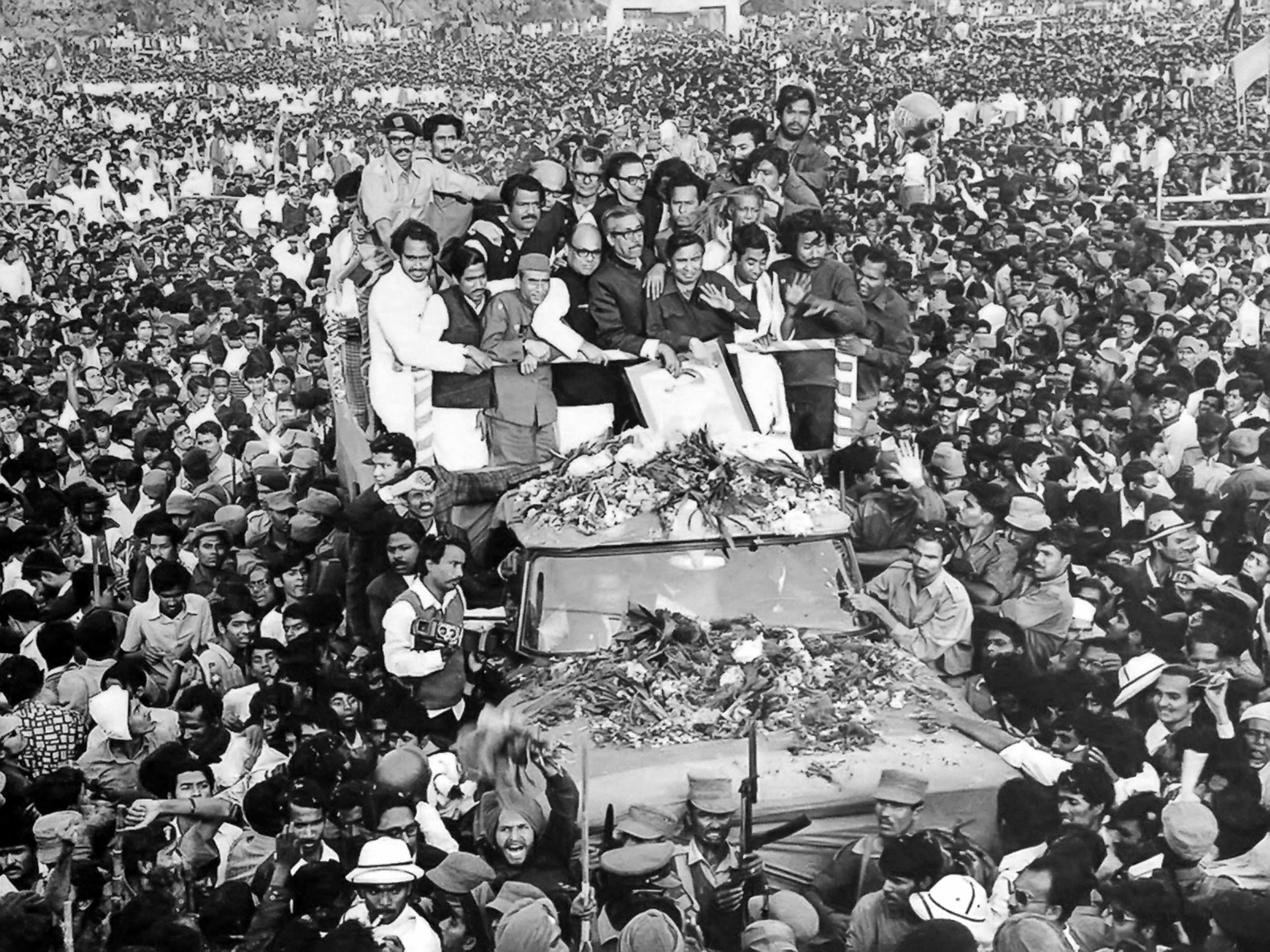
Sheikh Mujibur Rahman in Dhaka on his homecoming day in 1972.

After his release, Sheikh Mujibur Rahman arrived in London on 8 January by air. During his flight from Pakistan to the United Kingdom, some disguised individuals, allegedly sent to assassinate him, traveled on the same plane along with the Pakistan men's national field hockey team. Indian intelligence had received advance information about the assassination plot and increased security and surveillance for Mujib in London and Delhi. Before his arrival, the Pakistani government had informed the government of the United Kingdom via telegram not to disclose his arrival until he allowed it. He stayed in London for 26 hours. After Mujib's arriving, British prime minister Edward Heath congratulated him and held a meeting with him, during which the topics of Bangladesh–India relations and recognition of Bangladesh were discussed. Upon his arrival, Rezaul Karim, the High Commissioner of Bangladesh to the United Kingdom, first informed him that Bangladesh had become independent. (Note: However, according to Kamal Hossain, the DIG of Mianwali Jail had already informed Mujib of this earlier.)

He held a press conference in London, answering questions from journalists. He said that he would not respond to Bhutto's proposal until he returned to Bangladesh. The date and time of his return journey to Bangladesh were kept secret. On 9 January, Indira Gandhi called Mujib and proposed a layover in Delhi, which he accepted. On the same day, he departed for Bangladesh. On the morning of 10 January, the Royal Air Force plane carrying him stopped in Delhi, where he was formally received and gave a speech in Bengali at the request of the crowd. That same day, Mujib met Gandhi for the first time. According to Faruq Ahmed Choudhury, a government official traveling with Mujib, there was a plan to stop in Calcutta before Dacca, but the plan was changed suddenly, and the Calcutta stop was canceled. On the same day, at 13:41, Mujib landed in Dacca and returned to his newly independent homeland. After his return, he delivered a speech at the Racecourse Ground, where he rejected Bhutto's proposal. On 11 January, Mujib, as president, issued a provisional constitutional order in Bangladesh, which introduced parliamentary democracy in the country based on the Constituent Assembly of Bangladesh, consisting of legal members elected in the 1970 general and provincial elections. The next day, he became the prime minister of the country.

== Legacy ==
On May 1971, tensions escalated between Tajuddin Ahmad and other AL leaders and activists. At the time, rumors spread from the anti-Tajuddin camp alleging that, out of a desire for power, Ahmad had played a role in ensuring Mujib's arrest by the Pakistani government. During the Liberation War, a deep conflict developed between Ahmad and Khondaker Mostaq Ahmad, foreign minister of the provisional government. Mostaq prioritized Mujib's release over the independence of Bangladesh. The matter of Mujib's release was discussed at the Siliguri conference. In a speech there, Ahmad stated:

আমরা স্বাধীনতা চাই। স্বাধীনতা পেলেই বঙ্গবন্ধুকে আমাদের মাঝে পাব। বাংলাদেশের স্বাধীনতার জন্য যদি খোদা না করুন, বঙ্গবন্ধুর মৃত্যু হয় পাকিস্তানি হানাদারদের হাতে, তাইলে বঙ্গবন্ধু শহীদ হয়েও স্বাধীন বাঙ্গালী জাতির ইতিহাসে অমর ও চিরঞ্জীব হয়ে থাকবেন। তিনি একটি নতুন জাতির জনক হিসেবে ইতিহাসে স্বীকৃত হবেন। ব্যক্তি মুজিব, ব্যক্তি নজরুল, তাজউদ্দীন, কামরুজ্জামান কেউ হয়ত বেঁচে থাকবেন না। একদিন না একদিন আমাদের সকলকেই মরতে হবে।

"We want independence. Once we achieve that, we will have Bangabandhu among us. If, God forbid, Bangabandhu is killed by Pakistani invaders during our struggle for independence, he will be immortalized as a martyr in the history of a free Bengali nation. He will be recognized as the founding father of a new nation. Individuals like Mujib, Nazrul, Tajuddin, Qamaruzzaman—none of us may survive. One day or another, we must all die."

— Tajuddin Ahmad, Siliguri conference, 6 July 1971

Meanwhile, after 30 July, Mostaq sent a message to the U.S. Consul General in Calcutta proposing the formation of a confederation between Bangladesh and Pakistan in exchange for the release of Mujib. As a result, after 16 December, Mostaq was removed from his position as foreign minister. The AL circulated a poster titled "Sheikh Mujib's Trial" with the aim of mobilising public opinion against the trial of Mujib. The Bengalis could not accept the decision to put him on trial, and therefore they launched massive protests against it. During their demonstrations and processions, the slogan "শেখ মুজিবের, শেখ মুজিবের, মুক্তি চাই, মুক্তি চাই" (lit. 'Give release, give release, Sheikh Mujib's, Sheikh Mujib's') was widely used at the time. According to a claim made in the Organiser's report, when attempts were made twice in September to meet the imprisoned Mujib with the intention of offering his release in exchange for handing over Sandwip Island to the United States, he refused to meet Farland.

One commonly debated issue regarding Mujib's arrest is the belief that he had the opportunity to escape and lead the liberation war, but chose instead to surrender. According to Mujib, if he had fled, the army would have tortured Dacca's residents in their search for him. In the post-independence Mujib era, A. S. M. Abdur Rab, former member of the Bangladesh Chhatra League (BCL) and politician of the Jatiya Samajtantrik Dal (JSD), alleged that in 1971, Mujib had voluntarily surrendered to the Pakistan Army, and therefore he was the very first Razakar (Note: used as a pejorative term meaning "traitors".) in history. His statement sparked controversy at the time. According to journalist Mohammad Modabber, since the leader of a revolution does not voluntarily surrender to the government, doubts arose in the minds of Bengali youths after Mujib's arrest as to whether he had mysteriously surrendered to the Pakistan Army because he did not support Bangladesh's independence. Historian Badruddin Umar described Mujib's arrest as a voluntary surrender. According to him, although the AL and its intellectual supporters referred to the event as an arrest, in reality it was a surrender, since Mujib stayed home after instructing others to flee—indicating he was waiting for the army to arrive. In addition, Umar criticized Mujib's surrender on the grounds that due to absence, he could not lead the liberation war. However, according to scholar Ghulam Murshid, since Mujib was not a revolutionary like the leftists but rather a constitutionalist, Umar's criticism was not justified.

Following the July Uprising in 2024, tensions between the families of Mujib and Ahmad became increasingly evident. In March 2025, Sharmin Ahmad, Tajuddin Ahmad's daughter, claimed that AL politician and lawyer M Amir-ul Islam had informed his father that Mujib had rejected the suggestion to go into hiding and had prepared himself for arrest. On 4 June 2025, Sarjis Alam, a National Citizen Party politician, stated that although Mujib had significant pre-independence contributions, he voluntarily accepted captivity by the Pakistan Army during the liberation war and was absent from the battlefield.

== See also ==
- Arrest of Imran Khan
