= White Paper on the crisis in East Pakistan =

Pakistani governmental document

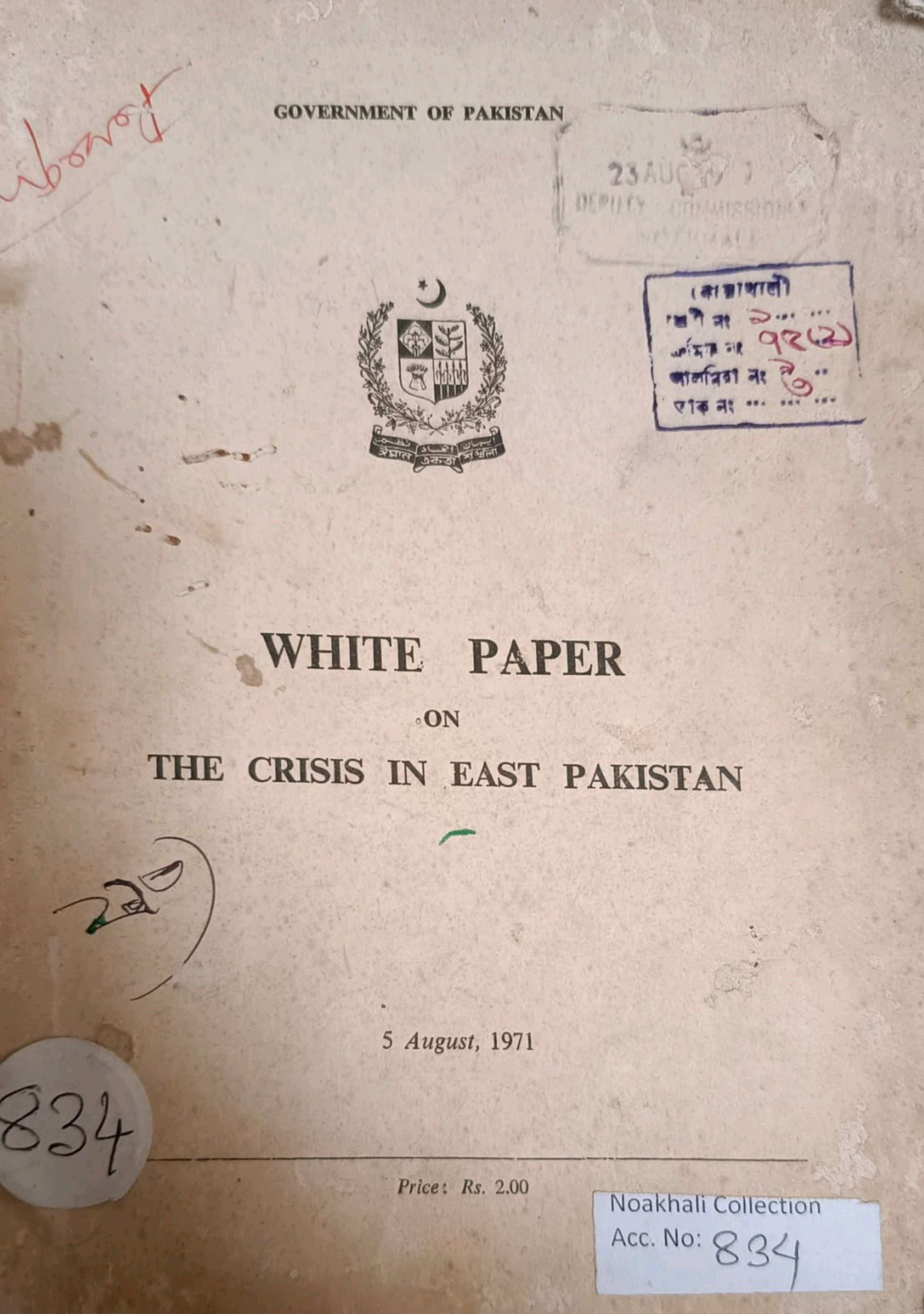
- Cover of the White Paper
- Created: 5 August 1971
- Location: Rawalpindi, Pakistan
- Subject: Operation Searchlight
- Purpose: Propaganda against the Bangladesh Liberation War and legitimizing the Bangladesh genocide

The White Paper on the crisis in East Pakistan is a white paper published by the government of Pakistan on 5 August 1971 in Rawalpindi. This propagandist document was published in the form of a printed booklet. It was published by the central government's ministry of information.

== Background ==
In the 1970 general election, the Awami League (AL) secured an absolute majority by winning 167 out of 313 seats, including reserved seats for women, in Pakistan's National Assembly. This victory made it inevitable for the AL to implement its Six Point program, which alarmed leaders of other political parties in West Pakistan, including the Pakistan People's Party (PPP). The ruling elite believed that implementing the Six Points would destroy Pakistan's unity. Following threats from PPP leader Zulfikar Ali Bhutto, president Yahya Khan announced the postponement of the National Assembly session scheduled for 1 March 1971 at 13:05 PM (UTC+6) in a radio address. In response, under the leadership of AL leader Sheikh Mujibur Rahman, the non-cooperation movement began in East Pakistan from 2 March. In 3 March, Khan announced a leaders' conference in Dhaka on 10 March and promised to convene the National Assembly within two weeks of the conference. While Bhutto agreed, Mujib rejected the proposal. Addressing Bhutto, Mujib stated that if he and others refused to accept a democratically framed constitution, a separate constitution would be drafted for East Pakistan. In his 7 March speech at Dhaka's Racecourse Ground, Mujib declared his party would attend the assembly session if four conditions were met: immediate withdrawal of martial law, return of military personnel to barracks, investigation into the genocide, and transfer of power to elected representatives.

During the movement, the central government gradually lost control over East Pakistan's civil administration. At one point, virtually all of East Pakistan outside military barracks was effectively under Mujib's directives. Citing the need to preserve Pakistan's unity and to suppress the ongoing movement, the Pakistani military launched Operation Searchlight on the night of 25 March, indiscriminately massacring unarmed, sleeping Bengalis in Dhaka, the provincial capital of East Pakistan. On the evening of 26 March, in a radio address on Radio Pakistan, president Khan declared the AL treasonous and banned it, while also seizing the party's bank accounts. Although Mujib was arrested, most AL leaders managed to escape. In this situation, the people of East Pakistan began resisting the Pakistani military, leading to the start of the Bangladesh Liberation War. International media began reporting on the East Pakistan crisis, tarnishing image of the government of Pakistan. On 31 July 1971, Pakistan's central government announced the publication of a white paper regarding Mujib's anti-state activities. On 5 August 1971, the Pakistani government published the white paper, detailing and justifying the actions taken in East Pakistan since 25 March.

== Content ==
Excluding the introduction, conclusion, and appendices, the white paper is divided into four chapters. It blames the AL's consensus on constitutional drafting for the crisis that emerged in 1971, claiming that the party used public support for autonomy in East Pakistan to engage in secessionist activities. Additionally, it accuses the party of intimidating the populace, thereby paralyzing the situation in East Pakistan through the non-cooperation movement. The white paper claims that the AL, in a joint conspiracy with India, plotted to secede East Pakistan from the state. As part of this plan, it alleges that a green signal was given from the AL's Dhaka office on the morning of 26 March for an armed rebellion, prompting the president to order Operation Searchlight to suppress it. According to the white paper, despite the AL's electoral victory granting it the authority to establish autonomy in East Pakistan based on the Six Points, the party raised additional demands during negotiations with the government. The AL's proposed concept of a confederation is described in the white paper as a "constitutional formula for secession."

According to the claims, Mujib appointed retired military officer M. A. G. Osmani as the commander-in-chief of the revolutionary forces in 25 March. The alleged plan involved the East Bengal Regiment capturing Dhaka and Chittagong, preventing Pakistani forces from entering East Pakistan, seizing military barracks, and killing soldiers. Subsequently, the Indian Army was to cross the border to assist the revolutionary forces. The white paper alleges that during the non-cooperation movement, the AL carried out massacres by attacking the non-Bengali Muhajir community. It also mentions India's role in the crisis and its assistance in the liberation war. The AL and Bengalis’ non-cooperation are blamed for necessitating Operation Searchlight. The white paper accuses the party of killing 60,000 Muhajirs in the nine months prior to its publication. It further claims that the AL was responsible for the deaths of at least 100,000 people during the non-cooperation movement.

== Historicity ==
During the war, the government published this white paper to legitimize its stance internationally. To this end, it justifies its crimes against humanity and provides false information regarding the role of opponents in the crisis. No evidence was found to support the claims of attacks and massacres by the AL against Muhajirs. The white paper avoids addressing the genocide in East Pakistan perpetrated by Pakistani forces.

== Reactions ==
Bengali leaders and the Provisional Government of Bangladesh rejected the white paper. Due to its propagandist nature, the white paper failed to gain acceptance among the global community. Pakistan's War Enquiry Report, disclosed in 2000, acknowledged that the white paper's propaganda in the media was inadequate and its delayed publication resulted in its failure to make a significant impact. According to political scientist Harry Blair, the claims in the white paper conflicted with reports obtained from foreign journalists at the scene during that time. On 25 April 2023, at an event unveiling a reprinted edition of the white paper organized by the Department of Films and Publications, Hasan Mahmud, the Information and Broadcasting Minister of fourth Hasina ministry, described the white paper as a valuable resource for studying the history of Bangladesh's independence, claiming that it clearly highlights the independence movement of Bangladesh under Mujib's leadership.
