= List of Hindu nationalist political parties =

The following is a list of political parties which espouse Hindu nationalist ideologies.

== Within India ==
=== National ===
- Bharatiya Janata Party

=== Regional ===
- Akhand Hindustan Morcha (National Capital Region)
- Asom Bharatiya Janata Party (Assam)
- Shiv Sena (2022–present) (Maharashtra)
- Shiv Sena (UBT) (Maharashtra)
- Hindu Samaj Party (Uttar Pradesh)
- Hindu Samhati (West Bengal)
- Hindu Makkal Katchi (Tamil Nadu)
- Maharashtra Navnirman Sena (Maharashtra)

=== Defunct ===
- Akhil Bharatiya Ram Rajya Parishad (merged with Bharatiya Jana Sangh)
- Bharatiya Jana Sangh (precursor to Bharatiya Janata Party)
- Bharatiya Janshakti Party (merged with Bharatiya Janata Party)
- Shiv Sena (split into Shiv Sena (2022–present) and Shiv Sena (UBT))

== Outside India ==
Malaysia

- Malaysia Makkal Sakti Party

Indonesia

- Indonesian Dharma Awakening Party

Nepal

- Rastriya Prajatantra Party
- Nepal Shivsena
- Nepal Janata Party

Pakistan

- Pakistan Hindu Party

Sri Lanka

- All Ceylon Hindu Congress
- Siva Senai

Mauritius

- All Mauritius Hindu Congress

Suriname

- Surinamese Hindu Party

== See also ==
- Hindutva
