= Bangladesh–Pakistan Confederation =

Proposed inter-state unification in South Asia

Confederation of Pakistan পাকিস্তান মিত্রসংঘ پاکستان کنفیڈریشن
- The proposed confederation shown in green in an orthographic projection
- Type: Proposed confederation
- State: Bangladesh; Pakistan

The Bangladesh–Pakistan Confederation is a proposed confederation between the People's Republic of Bangladesh (formerly East Pakistan) and the Islamic Republic of Pakistan (formerly West Pakistan). Its origin may refer to the notion of turning pre-1971 Pakistan into a confederated state between the East and the West Pakistan.

The idea originated in 1950 at the Grand Conference of the Democratic Federation in Dhaka as the 'United States of Pakistan'. After 1962, Pakistani president Ayub Khan discussed it with Ramizuddin Ahmed, and in 1966 Sheikh Mujibur Rahman's Six Point program also implied a confederal structure. In 1971, the Ahsan formula and the All-Pakistan Awami League suggested a confederation, but the central government rejected it. During the Bangladesh Liberation War, Khondaker Mostaq Ahmed secretly proposed the confederation in exchange for Sheikh Mujibur Rahman's release, reportedly accepted for discussion by the Pakistani president Yahya Khan.

After Bangladesh's independence, Pakistani president Zulfikar Ali Bhutto offered Sheikh Mujibur Rahman a confederation, which he declined. Following Mujib's assassination in 1975, rumors of a confederation under the Bangladeshi president Khondaker Mostaq Ahmed surfaced, prompting India to warn of military action if it violated the Indo-Bangladesh friendship treaty.

== Origin ==
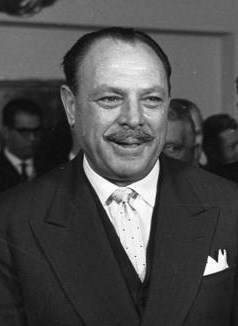
President Ayub Khan proposed transforming Pakistan into a confederation.

In 1950, three years after the formation of the Dominion of Pakistan, at the Grand Conference of the Democratic Federation held in Dhaka, a proposal was made to form the "United States of Pakistan", with only defence and foreign affairs entrusted to the centre. Mian Iftikharuddin, leader of the Azad Pakistan Party, believed that neither West Pakistan nor East Pakistan would be able to establish dominance over the other, while the regional differences and disparities between them could also lead to the proposed state's partition. Therefore, in 1955, he proposed in the Constituent Assembly of Pakistan that the country be constituted as a confederation. According to the book From Jinnah to Zia by Pakistan's Law Minister Muhammad Munir, after 1962, using the pretext of freeing the country from the so-called demands of the leaders of East Pakistan, President Ayub Khan proposed transforming the country into a confederation or granting autonomy to East Pakistan, or even granting independence, which was rejected by Krishak Sramik Party member and opposition leader Ramizuddin Ahmed. In 1966, for the federation of Pakistan, Sheikh Mujibur Rahman, general secretary of the East Pakistan Awami League, presented the six-point resolution in Lahore, which was actually a proposal to form a confederation between East Pakistan and West Pakistan. In early 1971, the Ahsan formula, prepared to resolve the political crisis in East Pakistan, proposed the formation of a confederation in which Sheikh Mujibur Rahman, president of the All-Pakistan Awami League, would be the prime minister of East Pakistan, Zulfikar Ali Bhutto, chairman of the Pakistan Peoples Party, would be the prime minister of West Pakistan, and the then president of Pakistan, Yahya Khan, would be the president of the proposed confederation. According to declassified U.S. documents released on 6 July 2005, Sheikh Mujibur Rahman had hoped for a confederation instead of independence for East Pakistan in 1971.

On 11 March 1971, during the non-cooperation movement, according to observations by Archer Blood, the then U.S. Consul General in Dhaka, in a telegram sent to the U.S. Embassy in Pakistan and the U.S. Department of State, the proposal of a confederation modelled on the Ahsan formula could have been a good solution in the prevailing circumstances. On 24 March 1971, in Dhaka, the Awami League held two rounds of discussions—morning and evening—with Yahya Khan and his advisers on the economic sections of Pakistan's proposed draft constitution. The party representatives proposed a confederation, named the "Confederation of Pakistan", in place of a federation. However, the government of Pakistan opposed this as it conflicted with the party's constitution. On the other hand, Zulfikar Ali Bhutto opposed the proposed confederation, describing it as effectively making the provinces almost independent. According to Indian historian Srinath Raghavan, the All-Pakistan Awami League at that time proposed a confederation for East Pakistan rather than directly demanding independence, rooted in the legitimate economic and political aspirations of the Bengali majority in Pakistan. According to the Hamoodur Rahman Commission Report, the proposed coalition of the Pakistan Peoples Party at the time between the two majority parties could only be applicable in the case of a confederation.

== History ==
Position of Pakistan and Bangladesh after the independence of Bangladesh

=== During the Liberation War of Bangladesh ===
According to Md. Moniruzzaman Chowdhury, acting director of the Youth and Reception Camp Department of the Provisional Government of Bangladesh, during the Bangladesh Liberation War in 1971, a group of the government supported a confederation. In September during the war, Khondaker Mostaq Ahmad, the provisional government's foreign minister, sent a message, through Kazi Zahirul Qayyum, an Awami League leader and organiser of the liberation war, to the US Consul General in Kolkata, India, proposing the establishment of a confederation between the two regions in exchange for the release of Sheikh Mujibur Rahman, imprisoned in West Pakistan. For this purpose, he also arranged a meeting with US government officials. Mostaq was supported in this endeavour by Foreign Secretary Mahbub Alam Chashi, who sought a representative to continue talks with Pakistan through American mediation. However, the message leaked to India's Research and Analysis Wing, which saw Mostaq meeting a member of the US Central Intelligence Agency at a hotel in Kolkata. After the Indian government and Mostaq's secretary Kamal Uddin Siddiqui informed Prime Minister Tajuddin Ahmad of the matter, the provisional government withdrew its decision to send Mostaq as Bangladesh's representative to the conference of the United Nations and removed him from the cabinet. According to US documents, on 4 September 1971, President Yahya Khan agreed to Khondaker Mostaq Ahmad's secret proposal for talks on forming a confederation, conveyed to Ambassador Joseph S. Farland.

=== After the independence of Bangladesh ===
After the war ended and East Pakistan became independent as Bangladesh, on 18 December 1971, Zulfikar Ali Bhutto tried to persuade William P. Rogers, US Secretary of State, to support the creation of a loose confederation between the two countries. After coming to power as head of state through the ouster of Yahya Khan, on 20 December 1971, he proposed in a speech to the nation to unite Pakistan and Bangladesh under a loose constitution. On 27 December 1971, at Chaklala, he even proposed to Sheikh Mujibur Rahman the creation of a loose union, i.e., a confederation, between the two countries, modelled on the United Arab Republic. At that time, there was discussion that finances, foreign affairs, and defence would not be separated for the confederation. On 7 January 1972, when Bhutto reminded him about the discussion, Mujib said to keep it secret and wait. However, he later refused to form a confederation. On 13 January 1972, in a letter to US President Richard Nixon, British Prime Minister Edward Heath warned about the proposed confederation and urged Nixon to dissuade Bhutto from pursuing it. In his view, in the context of the Cold War, any delay in recognising Bangladesh as a state could lead the country to join the Eastern Bloc. The Constitution of Pakistan, approved in 1973, referred to Bangladesh as one of its provinces, and on 8 May of the following year, through the First Amendment, granted the National Assembly of Pakistan the power to incorporate any state into Pakistan. According to a report in Weekly Bichitra, in 1974 Ghulam Azam, then president of the banned Jamaat-e-Islami East Pakistan, planned with some individuals from Pakistan and Bangladesh in East London to distribute leaflets in Bangladesh calling for the implementation of the confederation through an Islamic revolution.

In 1975, after the assassination of Sheikh Mujibur Rahman on 15 August, Khondaker Mostaq Ahmad assumed power. As the new president, he tried to normalise Bangladesh's relations with Pakistan. At the time, there were rumours that a confederation between Bangladesh and Pakistan might be formed. On 18 August 1975, Samar Sen, Indian High Commissioner to Bangladesh, was reported to read out to the new president the contents of a slip of paper in his possession, which stated, "If the name of the People's Republic of Bangladesh is changed and a confederation is made with any country, then under the valid treaty, the Indian Army will take appropriate action. But if you refrain from changing the name and the idea of a so-called confederation, India will consider whatever happens from 15 August onwards as Bangladesh's internal matter." On hearing this, Mostaq became dejected. After meeting with Sen, Mostaq announced, against the formation of a confederation, that no changes would be made to government laws, policies, or activities. After Ziaur Rahman became Bangladesh's army chief in 1975, a group continued to pressure him to implement the confederation. During President Abu Sadat Mohammad Sayem's tenure in 1976, the then Air Force chief Muhammad Ghulam Tawab and workers of Jamaat-e-Islami East Pakistan organised rallies and protests in support of the demand, allegedly. During his state visit to Pakistan in 1977, when Pakistan's Chief Martial Law Administrator Zia-ul-Haq asked about the possibility of forming the confederation, Ziaur Rahman, who was the then Bangladeshi president, indirectly rejected the proposal by referring to his country's sovereignty, independence, and the principle of non-interference in internal affairs in state relations.

In the context of improved relations between the two countries, in 2025 Pakistani journalist and political analyst Javed Rana presented a blueprint at Islamabad's Quaid-i-Azam University for implementing a confederation between Bangladesh and Pakistan with the aim of building resistance against India. In the same year, Abdul Qayyum, a politician of the Pakistan Muslim League (N), proposed forming a confederation between Pakistan and Bangladesh for economic improvement, where Bangladesh could receive military assistance from Pakistan and Pakistan could receive trade assistance from Bangladesh. According to the analysis of Syed Rizwan Haider Bukhari, a political science professor at Islamia College University, in a journal article published in 2026, the formation of a confederation between the two countries is practically unrealistic due to several identified factors.

== See also ==
- India–Pakistan Confederation
- Afghanistan–Pakistan Confederation
- Lahore Resolution
