= International recognition of Bangladesh =

Independence war

The Bangladesh Liberation War was a revolutionary war of independence that took place in South Asia in 1971; it resulted in the establishment of the People's Republic of Bangladesh. The war pitted East Pakistan against West Pakistan and lasted nine months. It witnessed a large-scale genocide involving widespread atrocities, the exodus of 10 million refugees and the indiscriminate killing of 300,000 to 3,000,000 people.

The war broke out on 26 March 1971 when the Pakistan Army launched an military operation called Operation Searchlight against Bengali civilians, students, intelligentsia and armed personnel who were demanding that the Pakistani military junta accept the results of the 1970 first democratic elections of Pakistan (which were won by an eastern party) or allow separation between East and West Pakistan. Bengali politicians and army officers announced the declaration of Bangladesh's independence in response to Operation Searchlight. Bengali military, paramilitary and civilians formed the Mukti Bahini ("Liberation Army"), which engaged in guerrilla warfare against Pakistani forces. The Pakistan Army, in collusion with religious extremist militias (the Razakars, Al-Badr and Al-Shams), engaged in the systematic genocide and atrocities against Bengali civilians, particularly nationalists, intellectuals, youth and religious minorities. Bangladesh government-in-exile was set up in the city of Calcutta (now Kolkata) in the Indian state of West Bengal.

India entered the war on 3 December 1971 after Pakistan launched pre-emptive air strikes on northern India. Overwhelmed by two war fronts, Pakistani defences soon collapsed. On 16 December, the Allied Forces of Bangladesh and India defeated Pakistan in the east. The subsequent surrender resulted in the largest number of prisoners of war since World War II.

== Foreign reaction ==
=== United Nations ===
Though the United Nations condemned the human rights violations during and following Operation Searchlight, it failed to defuse the situation politically before the start of the war.

Following the declaration of independence in March 1971 by the people of Bangladesh, India undertook a worldwide campaign to drum up political, democratic and humanitarian support for the people of Bangladesh for their liberation struggle. Prime Minister Indira Gandhi toured a large number of countries in a bid to create awareness of the Pakistani atrocities against Bengalis. This effort later proved vital during the war in the way it framed the world's context of the war and justified military action by India. Also, following Pakistan's defeat, it ensured prompt recognition of the newly independent state of Bangladesh.

Following India's entry into the war, Pakistan, fearing certain defeat, made urgent appeals to the United Nations to intervene and force India to agree to a ceasefire. The UN Security Council assembled on 4 December 1971 to discuss the hostilities in South Asia. After lengthy discussions on 7 December, the United States made a resolution for "immediate cease-fire and withdrawal of troops". While supported by the majority, the USSR vetoed the resolution twice and the United Kingdom and France abstained on the resolution.

On 12 December, with Pakistan facing imminent defeat, the United States requested that the Security Council be reconvened. Pakistan's Deputy Prime Minister and Foreign Minister, Zulfikar Ali Bhutto, was rushed to New York City to make the case for a resolution on the ceasefire. The council continued deliberations for four days. By the time proposals were finalised, Pakistan's forces in the East had surrendered and the war had ended, making the measures merely academic. Bhutto, frustrated by the failure of the resolution and the inaction of the United Nations, ripped up his speech and left the council.

Most UN member nations were quick to recognize Bangladesh within months of its independence.

=== Bhutan ===
Bhutan became the first country in the world to recognize the newly independent state on 6 December 1971. Muhammad Ullah, the President of Bangladesh, visited Bhutan accompanied by his wife to attend the coronation of Jigme Singye Wangchuck, the fourth king of Bhutan in June 1974.

=== India ===
India was the second country to recognize Bangladesh as a separate and independent state and established diplomatic relations with the country immediately after its independence on 6 December 1971. Bangladesh had received implied recognition from India when they set up their first diplomatic missions in Kolkata and Delhi in September 1971; however, the official recognition didn't come until two months later.

=== Myanmar ===
Myanmar (Burma) was one of the first countries to recognize Bangladesh.

=== US and USSR ===
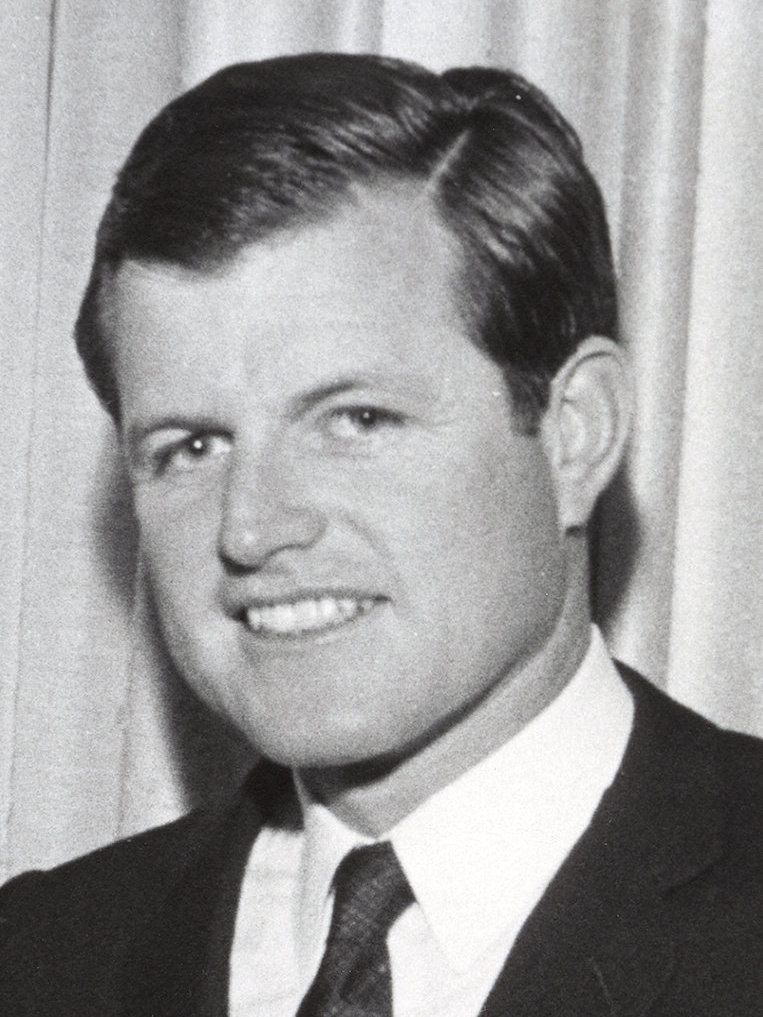
Senator Ted Kennedy led congressional support for the liberation of Bangladesh

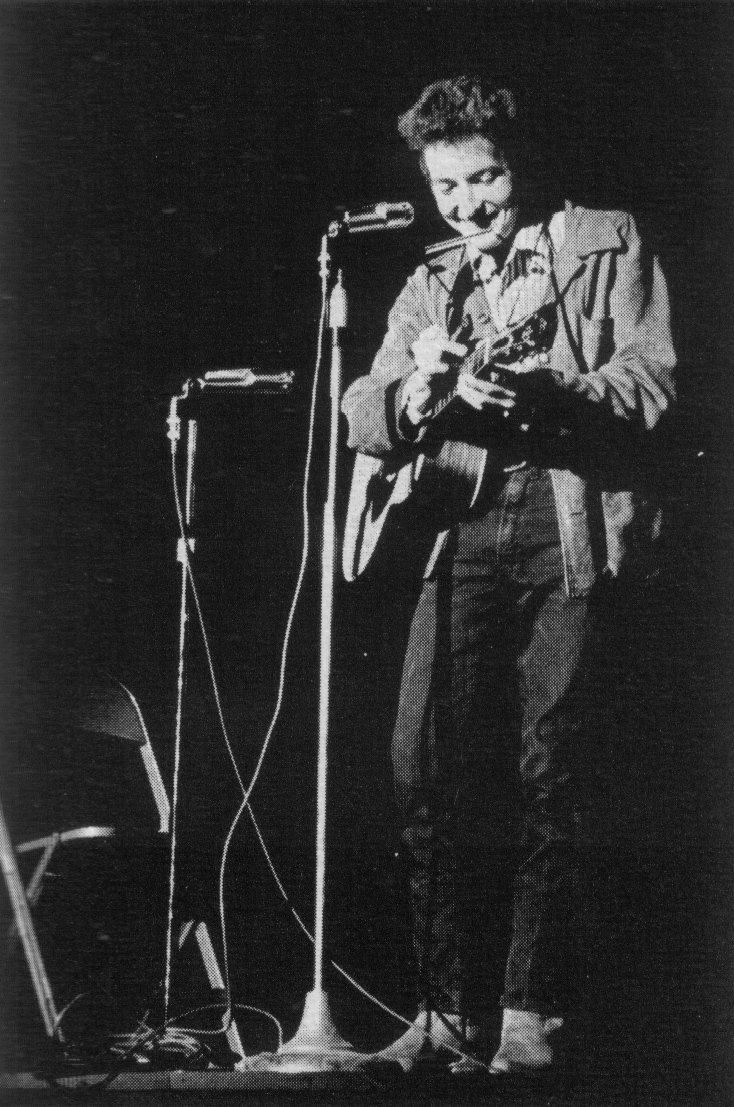
Bob Dylan took part in the Concert for Bangladesh at Madison Square Garden in New York City, August 1971

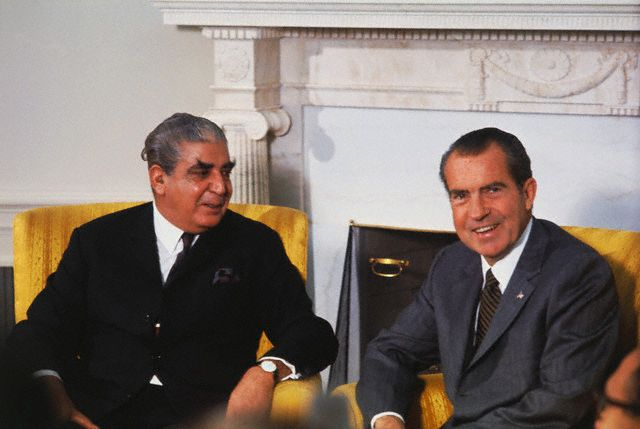
The Nixon administration was widely criticised for its close ties with the military junta led by General Yahya Khan. American diplomats in East Pakistan expressed profound dissent in the Blood telegram

The United States supported Pakistan both politically and materially. US President Richard Nixon denied getting involved in the situation, saying that it was an internal matter of Pakistan, but when Pakistan's defeat seemed certain, Nixon sent the aircraft carrier USS Enterprise to the Bay of Bengal, a move deemed by the Indians as a nuclear threat. Enterprise arrived on station on 11 December 1971. Declassified Indian Air Force documents reveal the Indians were planning a kamikaze-like strike attack using B1 Canberra bombers; however, on 6 and 13 December, the Soviet Navy dispatched two groups of ships, armed with nuclear missiles, from Vladivostok; they trailed US Task Force 74 in the Indian Ocean from 18 December until 7 January 1972. Nixon and Henry Kissinger feared Soviet expansion into South and Southeast Asia. Pakistan was a close ally of the People's Republic of China, with whom Nixon had been negotiating a rapprochement and which he intended to visit in February 1972. Nixon feared that an Indian invasion of West Pakistan would mean total Soviet domination of the region, which in turn would seriously undermine the global position of the United States and the regional position of America's new tacit ally, China. To demonstrate to China the bona fides of the United States as an ally, and in direct violation of the US Congress-imposed sanctions on Pakistan, Nixon sent military supplies to Pakistan and routed them through Jordan and Iran, while also encouraging China to increase its arms supplies to Pakistan. The Nixon administration also ignored reports it received of Pakistan Army's genocidal activities in East Pakistan, most notably the Blood telegram.

The Soviet Union supported Bangladesh and Indian armies, as well as the Mukti Bahini during the war, recognising that the independence of Bangladesh would weaken the position of its rivals – the United States and China. It gave assurances to India that if a confrontation with the United States or China developed, the USSR would take countermeasures. This was enshrined in the Indo-Soviet friendship treaty signed in August 1971. The Soviets also sent a nuclear submarine to ward off the threat posed by USS Enterprise in the Indian Ocean.

At the end of the war, the Warsaw Pact countries were among the first to recognise Bangladesh. The Soviet Union accorded recognition to Bangladesh on 25 January 1972. The United States delayed recognition for some months, before according it on 8 April 1972.

=== Pakistan ===
Pakistan, which Bangladesh had gained independence from in the 1971 war, didn't recognise the country until it was pressured by other Muslim-majority nations. Awami Leader, Sheikh Mujibur Rahman, was kept imprisoned, or some say was in custody by Pakistani authorities (even after the end of war) before being released in January 1972. The recognition issue had been stuck over Pakistan wanting to avoid any of its nationals being tried for war crimes. Muslim-majority countries including Jordan, Egypt, Indonesia and Saudi Arabia however pressured it because they wanted to fix this discord that had emerged in the Islamic world. Foreign ministers of seven nations went to Bangladesh to convince it to drop its planned trials. On 22 February 1974, Pakistani Prime Minister Zulfikar Ali Bhutto officially announced recognition of the country during a speech before a Lahore television studio that was filled to full capacity; he also got emotional while speaking. He added that while he didn't like it, Bangladesh's independence was a reality. In return, Bangladesh agreed to attend the Organisation of Islamic Conference summit that was being held that year in Lahore.

Bhutto landed in Bangladesh for a visit on 27 June 1974, the first visit by a Pakistani leader since the 1971 war. The two discussed the division of assets between the two nations and Pakistan accepting more non-Bengalis from the country. However, relations between the two countries remained lukewarm because of the dispute on assets and the issues of the Bihari Muslims. After the 15 August 1975 Bangladesh coup d'état, Pakistan immediately recognized the new government and relations improved. Ambassadorial relations were established in January 1976 with Bangladeshi ambassador Zahiruddin and Pakistani ambassador Mohammad Khurshid assuming their respective posts.

=== China ===
As a long-standing ally of Pakistan, the People's Republic of China reacted with alarm to the evolving situation in East Pakistan and the prospect of India invading West Pakistan and Pakistani-administered Kashmir. Believing that just such an Indian attack was imminent, Nixon encouraged China to mobilise its armed forces along its border with India to discourage it. However, the Chinese did not respond to this encouragement since unlike the 1962 Sino-Indian War (where India was caught entirely unaware what China was doing), the Indian Army this time was prepared and had deployed eight mountain divisions to the Sino-Indian border to guard against such an eventuality. Instead, China threw its weight behind demands for an immediate ceasefire.

When Bangladesh applied for membership to the United Nations in 1972, China vetoed their application because two United Nations resolutions regarding the repatriation of Pakistani prisoners of war and civilians had not yet been implemented. China was also among the last countries to recognise independent Bangladesh, refusing to do so until 31 August 1975.

== List of countries in order of their recognition of Bangladesh ==
The list of countries that recognized Bangladesh upon its independence are listed according to their order in The Congressional Record (9 February 1972) of Senate.

International recognition of Bangladesh by year (1971–1975 and 1986)

	Country	Date of recognition
1	Bhutan	6 December 1971
2	India	6 December 1971
3	East Germany	11 January 1972
4	Poland	12 January 1972
5	Bulgaria	12 January 1972
6	Burma	13 January 1972
7	Nepal	16 January 1972
8	Barbados	20 January 1972
9	Yugoslavia	22 January 1972
10	Soviet Union	24 January 1972
11	Byelorussian SSR	24 January 1972
12	Ukrainian SSR	24 January 1972
13	Tonga	25 January 1972
14	Czechoslovakia	26 January 1972
15	Cyprus	26 January 1972
16	Hungary	26 January 1972
17	Australia	26 January 1972
18	Fiji	26 January 1972
19	New Zealand	26 January 1972
20	Senegal	1 February 1972
21	United Kingdom	4 February 1972
22	West Germany	4 February 1972
23	Finland	4 February 1972
24	Denmark	4 February 1972
25	Sweden	4 February 1972
26	Norway	4 February 1972
27	Iceland	4 February 1972
28	Austria	4 February 1972
29	Israel	7 February 1972
30	Japan	10 February 1972
31	Luxembourg	11 February 1972
32	Netherlands	11 February 1972
33	Belgium	11 February 1972
34	Ireland	11 February 1972
35	Italy	12 February 1972
36	France	14 February 1972
37	Canada	14 February 1972
38	Singapore	16 February 1972
39	Mauritius	20 February 1972
40	Philippines	24 February 1972
41	Malaysia	25 February 1972
42	Indonesia	25 February 1972
43	Malawi	29 February 1972
44	Gambia	2 March 1972
45	Sri Lanka	4 March 1972
46	Republic of China	14 April 1972
47	United States	4 April 1972
48	Malagasy	14 April 1972
49	Iraq	8 July 1972
50	Upper Volta	19 September 1972
51	Pakistan	22 February 1974
52	Turkey	22 February 1974
53	Somalia	24 December 1974
54	Saudi Arabia	16 August 1975
55	People's Republic of China	31 August 1975

== See also ==
- Foreign relations of Bangladesh
- History of Bangladesh
