= Nepal Shivsena =

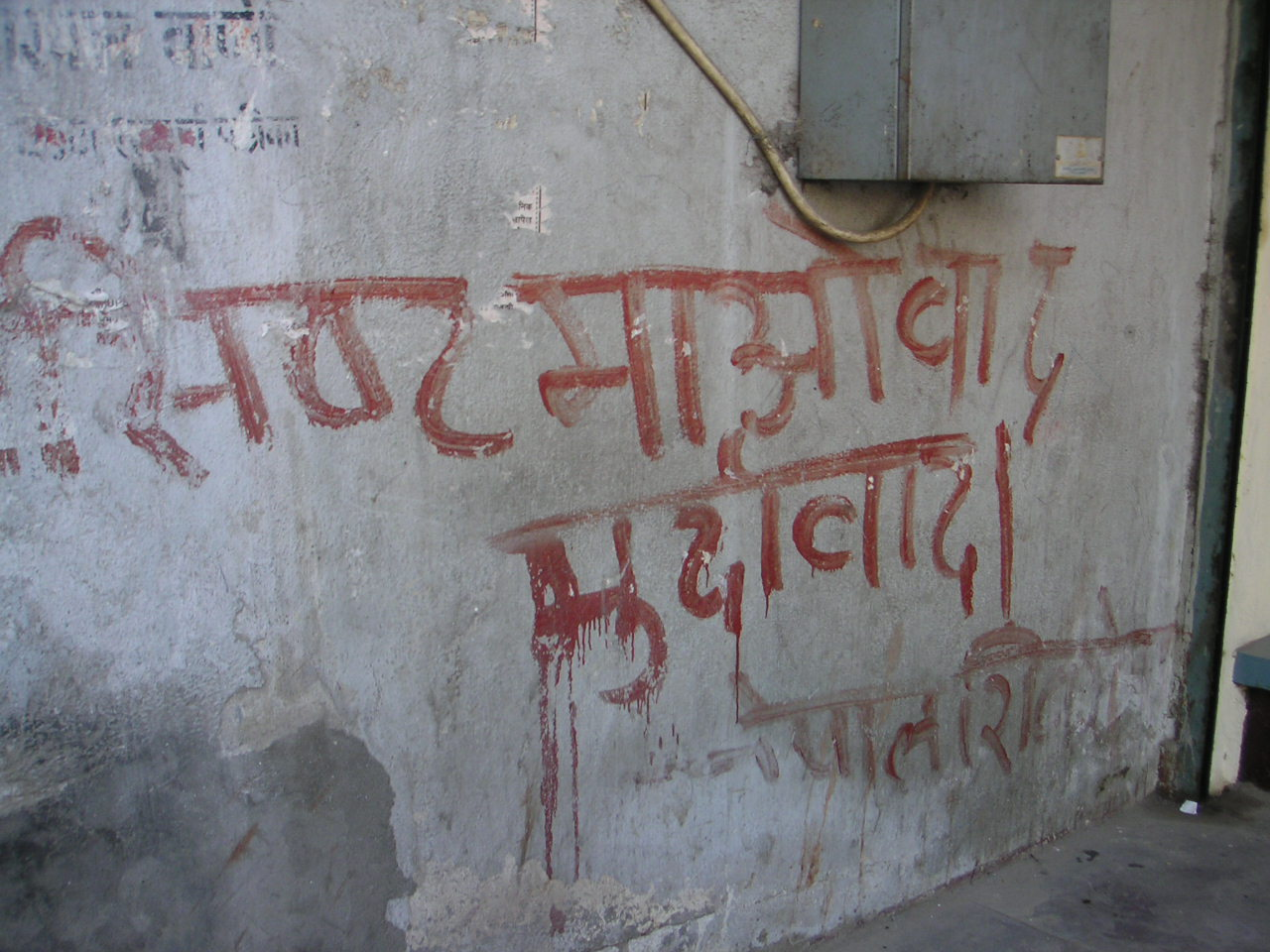
Nepal Shivsena wall-painting, saying 'Down with Maoism'

Nepal Shivsena (Nepali: नेपाल शिवसेना) is a Hindutva political party in Nepal. The party was founded in 1999. It is connected to the Shiv Sena in India. Raj Kumar Rauniyar is the current president of the party.

When the Taliban began destroying the Buddhistic ancient artifacts, the Nepal Shiv Sena strongly criticized the attacks.
