= Ramizuddin Ahmed =

Ramizuddin Ahmed was a social worker and politician.

== Early life ==
Ahmed was born in 1902 in Gazipur village, Daudkandi Upazila, Comilla District, Bengal Presidency, British India. He completed his undergrad and masters in Arabic language. Afterwards he finished law school.

== Career ==
Ahmed started his legal practice in Comilla District. In 1936, he joined the Krishak Praja Party led by A. K. Fazlul Huq. He was elected to the Bengal Legislative Assembly in 1937 and served there till 1945. He worked towards the abolition of the Zamidar system and amending the Tenancy Act. He represented Trippera in the Assembly. During the Bengal Famine of 1943, he said in the assembly the food kitchens were initially open through private initiative and then afterwards government initiative.

In 1956, he was elected to the National Assembly of Pakistan. He was an appointed the Minister of Communication. He is known for improving the railways in East Pakistan during his tenure as Communication Minister. He was re-elected to the National Assembly of Pakistan in 1962.

== Death ==
Ahmed died in 1985.
