= Ahsan's Formula =

Peace mission in Pakistan

Ahsan's Formula was a peace initiative mission led by Vice-Admiral S. M. Ahsan, then-governor of East Pakistan and commander of the army in the Eastern Theatre, to work out a peace initiative to end the political crises in East Pakistan.

The formula came in the wake of increasingly strained and difficult foreign relations between West Pakistan and East Pakistan since the civil unrest had gripped East Pakistan as Awami League's demonstrations and demands for the provincial autonomy against Pakistan's central administration after the general elections held in 1970. Following the mass murder of students and faculty in Dhaka University by the Pakistan Army, and ultimatum issued by India to intervene in the conflict, Pakistan had authorized Admiral Ahsan to carry out the investigations into a possible Indian intervention through a cable communication to work out a possible peace solution to end violence in East.

The recommendations based on the studies were roughly based on six-point movement proposed by the Awami League in 1969 and called for:

- Islamabad would control the defence, military, foreign, national security, and the currency.
- Province(s) would have the authority to raise revenue and would fund the subject of the federation.
- Repatriation of West Pakistani citizens and bureaucrats to Pakistan with East Pakistanis stationed back to East.
- Equal divisions of national assets between West Pakistan and East Pakistan based on population census.

The formula also called for Pakistan becoming a co-federation with Yahya Khan as president with Mujib being the Prime Minister of East while Bhutto being Prime Minister of Pakistan. Civil servants from Pakistan stationed in East would repatriated to Pakistan and the national assets would equally be divided between East and West Pakistan. The proposal was met with strong support from the international community and India fell in line though reluctant.

The formula was supported by the political leaders of West Pakistan, with the exception of Zulfikar Ali Bhutto, and by the international community, including, reluctantly, India. However, the formula was not supported by the military elements in the Yahya administration who debated acrimoniously over the scope of the mission's recommendations among the advisors in Yahya administration.

By the fall of 1971, the mission's recommendations were bypassed with Admiral Ahsan submitting his resignation and posted back to Pakistan, followed by the resignation of Lieutenant-General Yaqub Ali Khan.

== See also ==
- Six point movement

== Bibliography ==
- Salik, PA, Brigadier Siddiq (1997) [First published in 1977]. "§The Man of Honor and Integrity: Admiral Syed Mohammad Ahsan, Unified Commander of Pakistan Armed Forces in East Pakistan". Witness To Surrender. Oxford University Press. pp. 60–90. ISBN 978-0-19-577761-1.
- Shariff, Admiral Mohammad (2010). Admiral's Diary: Battling Through Stormy Sea Life for Decades. Army Press. p. 415.
