= India–Pakistan Confederation =

Proposed political confederation

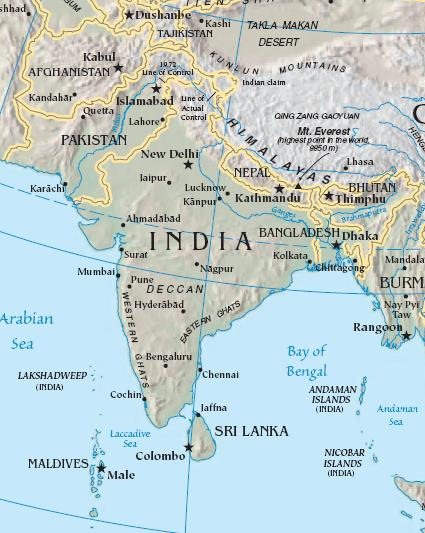
Map of South Asia

The concept of an India–Pakistan Confederation advocates for a political confederation consisting of the sovereign states of India and Pakistan as a means of ending bilateral conflicts and promoting common interests in defence, foreign affairs, and cultural and economic development. While this idea does not propose to end the sovereign existence of either nation through reunification, it is aimed to resolve the conflicts afflicting the subcontinent since the partition of India in 1947.

== Background ==
The partitioning of India formally came into effect on 14 August 1947, dividing the provinces of Bengal (with East Pakistan, now Bangladesh) and Punjab (with West Pakistan, now Pakistan proper) to create a separate nation (from India) as outlined by the Pakistan Movement, which advocated the "Two-Nation Theory" — that Muslims and Hindus cannot sustain a nation together because of religious differences that would prove too difficult to compromise on or, in some cases, simply impossible to reach a mutual consensus on. The partition provoked great communal conflicts and shortly afterwards, a major dispute over the territory of Kashmir (a former princely state under the British Raj which was sovereignly claimed in full by both the Dominion of India and Dominion of Pakistan) sparked a large-scale war between the two neighbouring countries. India and Pakistan have, since their independence, engaged in four armed conflicts against each other (1947, 1965, 1971, 1999), all of them stemming from their disputes in Kashmir with the exception of the war in 1971. However, some diplomatic efforts have succeeded in promoting bilateral trade and sports events between the two nations as well as permitting Indians and Pakistanis to peacefully cross the border and visit through services provided by the Samjhauta Express and the Delhi-Lahore binational bus route. The 1972 Shimla Agreement and subsequent bilateral accords have bound both nations to seek a peaceful solution to the Kashmir conflict while promoting trade and economic cooperation.

== Confederation ==
Some politicians and academicians in India and Pakistan have promoted the concept of a confederation between the two republics as a means to resolve their conflicts while promoting common cultural bonds, economic development and solidarity in major issues, with a ceremonial head of state and important posts held alternately by Indians and Pakistanis. Prime Minister of India Jawaharlal Nehru and Chief Minister of Jammu and Kashmir Sheikh Abdullah supported the idea. In 1972, Zulfikar Ali Bhutto, the civilian Chief Martial Law Administrator of Pakistan, explored the possibility of a Pakistan-India Confederation and asked "the Government-owned Pakistan Times to write in favour of India-Pakistan confederation." Some advocates of the concept perceive the two-nation theory to have been a failure, being unable to resolve conflicts between Muslims and Hindus, and that a closer bonding of the two nations would be the best possible solution and bring about a greater possibility of peace, prosperity and progress in the region. According to some advocates, such an arrangement would not only end the Kashmir conflict and bring about peace, but would forge a powerful geopolitical entity of equal standing with various global powers such as the United States, European Union, Russia and China. As a result of a confederation between Pakistan and India, M. V. Kamath said that instead of spending exorbitant amounts of money on defense, the India–Pakistan Confederation would have funds "available for constructive activities like health, education and economic infrastructure." Kamath appealed to the Hindu–Muslim unity demonstrated in the War of Indian Independence in 1857 as support for an India–Pakistan Confederation. The India–Pakistan Confederation, according to Kamath, would have a common currency and a common Parliament.

Former Vice President of India Mohammad Hamid Ansari called for an India–Pakistan Confederation that would be "based on the principle of equality" and in which "India, Pakistan and Bangladesh should remain separate, and yet together on issues of common concern and common benefit." According to Pakistani historian Ayesha Jalal and former Pakistani Prime Minister Ismail Ibrahim Chundrigar, the Lahore Resolution originally called for a Hindustan-Pakistan Confederation in a United India, not for Pakistan as a separate state from the rest of India. Chundrigar "said that the object of the Lahore Resolution was not to create Ulsters (a reference to the violent separatist movement aimed at Northern Ireland's independence from the United Kingdom), not to 'destroy the unity of India', but to get the 'two nations (Pakistan and Hindustan)... welded into united India on the basis of equality'. Harry Hodson, the Reforms Commissioner in India in 1941, said that leaders of the All-India Muslim League "interpreted Pakistan as consistent with a confederation".

Lieutenant General Asad Durrani, the former director-general of both Pakistan's Inter-Services Intelligence and Military Intelligence, envisioned in 2018 a future India–Pakistan Confederation that would possess a common currency and laws. Durrani stated that such an India–Pakistan Confederation would soften the borders of India and Pakistan and eventually integrate the armed forces of both entities, paving the way for Indian reunification, in which Delhi would serve as the capital city.

Asghar Ali Engineer envisaged a broader confederation between the members of the South Asian Association for Regional Cooperation (SAARC) – Afghanistan, Bangladesh, Bhutan, India, Nepal, Pakistan and Sri Lanka – akin to the European Union. Dinanath Mishra supported such a confederation, and believed that along with India, "Countries like Afghanistan, Nepal and Sri Lanka may be willing to start the process this decade itself".

Pakistani Minister for Kashmir Affairs, Makhdoom Syed Faisal Saleh Hayat, advocated an India–Pakistan Confederation that would govern the state of Jammu and Kashmir, "taking responsibility for defence, currency and foreign affairs".

Critics have described the proposal as naïve and impractical given the extent of mutual distrust and antagonism between India and Pakistan after decades of consistent fighting and skirmishes.

== Reactions ==
The idea of a confederation gained prominence with the endorsement of senior Indian political leader and then-Deputy Prime Minister Lal Krishna Advani, who on April 29, 2004, said in an interview to the Pakistani newspaper Dawn, that he envisaged both nations coming together to form a confederation: "I conceive that there would be a time when decades hence, both the countries would feel that partition has not solved matters. Why not come together and form some form of confederation or something like that." Another senior Indian politician, Dr. Ram Manohar Lohia had similarly advocated the idea. This public endorsement from Advani, a prominent Hindu leader, gave rise to much speculation and media coverage, but the Ministry of Foreign Affairs in Pakistan responded by calling the idea a "mirage," stating that both nations were sovereign in their own right and this status was in their view "irreversible." On the other hand, Pakistani leader Altaf Hussain who founded the Muttahida Qaumi Movement has had a favourable stance towards an India-Pakistan confederation, saying that such a confederation would "set another example like the European Union." Some leaders throughout other nations of South Asia have discussed the practicality of this idea. Some advocates added ideas such as the two nations retaining their sovereignty but issuing and dealing in the same currency and also signing an accord with which they can resolve problems related to defence with world powers like the United States, European Union and Russia.

Some Pakistani commentators have argued that Indian leaders specifically rejected the notion of such a confederation during the early years of the Cold War, when Pakistan attempted to covertly contact India to outline the possibility of India–Pakistan defence cooperation in Kashmir against growing Chinese ambitions in the region, which was rejected by India with the reasoning that the entirety of Kashmir is an integral part of India alone which shuts down the question of any Pakistani presence in the region. Others have contended that two nations did not necessarily imply two states, and the fact that Bangladesh did not merge with India despite the cultural similarities (especially with Indian Bengal) after separating from Pakistan supports the initial two-nation theory professed by the Pakistan Movement. However, many see the separation of Bangladesh from Pakistan in itself to be a rejection of the two-nation theory, since ethnic nationalism trumped religious nationalism.

== See also ==
- Greater India
- India–Pakistan relations
  - Partition of India
  - Opposition to the Partition of India
    - 1946 Cabinet Mission to India
  - Indian reunification
- Bangladesh–Pakistan Confederation
- Afghanistan–Pakistan Confederation
