= Akhand Hindustan Morcha =

Akhand Hindusthan Morcha (Great India Front), a Hindutva nationalist political outfit in India. The front is led by Baikunth Lal Sharma, former Bharatiya Janata Party MP from East Delhi.
