= Six Point program =

1966 political autonomy movement in East Pakistan

Six Point Program ছয় দফা কর্মসূচি (Bengali)
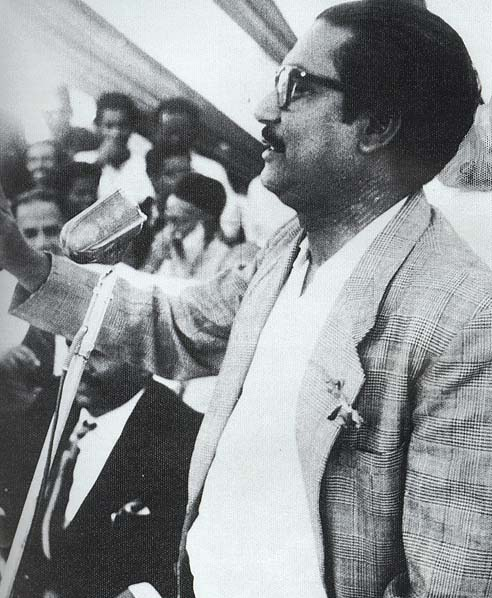
- Bangabandhu Sheikh Mujibur Rahman announcing the six points in Lahore
- Presented: 6 February 1966
- Location: Lahore, Punjab, Pakistan
- Signatories: All-Pakistan Awami League
- Purpose: Grant of full autonomy to East Pakistan

The Six Point program (Note: Bengali: ছয় দফা কর্মসূচি, romanized: Chôẏ Dôpha kôrmôśuci, pronounced [ˈtʃʰɔe̯ ˈdɔpʰaˑ ˈkɔɾmɔʃutʃiˑ]) was a significant political campaign in East Pakistan, led by Bangabandhu Sheikh Mujibur Rahman, advocating for greater autonomy for the region. Initiated in 1966, the movement aimed to address the six demands proposed by a coalition of Bengali nationalist political parties to end the perceived exploitation by West Pakistani rulers. This movement is regarded as a crucial milestone on the path to Bangladesh's independence.

== Background ==
Opposition leaders in East Pakistan called for a national conference on 6 February 1966, to assess the trend of post-Tashkent politics. On 4 February, Rahman, along with some members of the Awami League, arrived in Lahore to attend the conference. The next day on 5 February, he presented the six points to the subject committee and urged its inclusion in the agenda for the following day's conference. The proposal was rejected, and Rahman was labelled as a separatist. Consequently, on 6 February, Rahman boycotted the conference. On 21 February, the six points proposal was presented at a meeting of the Awami League's working committee and was accepted unanimously.

The six points were proposed to grant greater autonomy to East Pakistan. Following the partition of India, the new state of Pakistan was established. The inhabitants of East Pakistan (later Bangladesh) constituted the majority of Pakistan's population, and exports from East Pakistan, such as jute, accounted for a significant portion of Pakistan's export income. However, East Pakistanis felt they did not receive a proportional share of political power and economic benefits within Pakistan. A statistical overview of economic discrimination is below:

Year	Spending on West Pakistan (in crore rupees)	Amount spent on West as percentage of total	Spending on East Pakistan (in crore rupees)	Amount spent on East as percentage of total
% of total population		36.23		63.77
1950-55	1,129	68.31	524	31.69
1955-60	1,655	75.95	524	24.05
1960-65	3,355	70.5	1,404	29.5
1965-70	5,195	70.82	2,141	29.18
Total	11,334	71.16	4,593	28.84
Source: Reports of the Advisory Panels for the Fourth Five Year Plan 1970-75, Vol. I, published by the planning commission of Pakistan (quick reference: crore = 10^{7}, or 10 million)

East Pakistan was facing a critical situation due to continuous regional discrimination over the years. As a result, economists, intellectuals, and politicians in East Pakistan began to question this discrimination, leading to the historic six-point movement.

== Draft of six-points ==
Rehman Sobhan, Nurul Islam, Khairul Kabir, Anisur Rahman, Muzaffar Ahmed Chowdhury, Khan Sarwar Murshid, and other prominent intellectuals drafted the six-point demand.

== The resolution ==
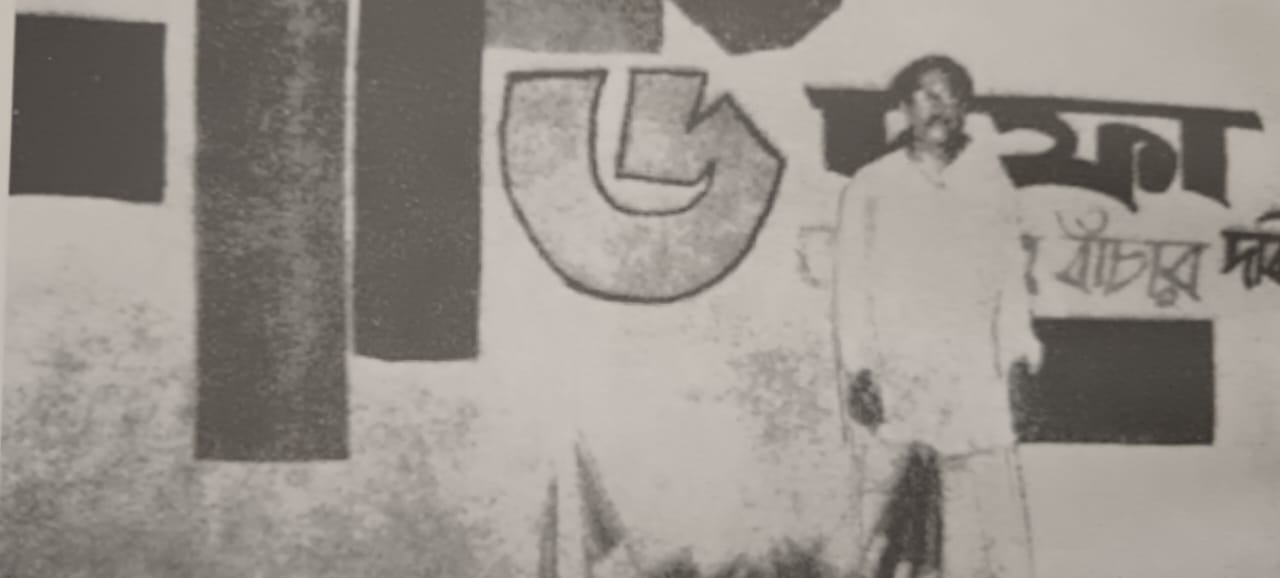
Bangabandhu Sheikh Mujibur Rahman at the Eden Hotel ground explaining Six Point Movement on 20 March 1966

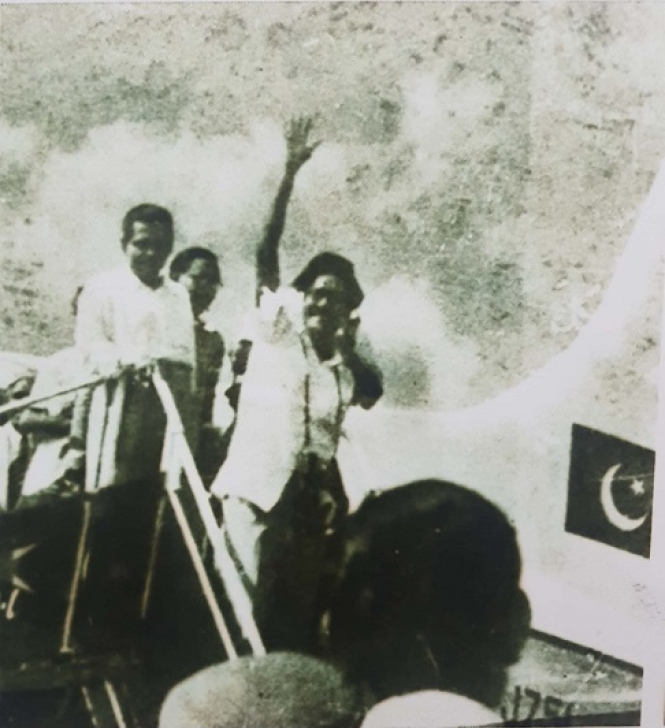
Bangabandhu Sheikh Mujibur Rahman returning from Lahore with Tofazzal Hossain Manik Miah after declaring Six Points

The six points are noted as follows:

1. The Constitution should provide for a Federation of Pakistan in its true sense based on the Lahore Resolution, and the parliamentary form of government with supremacy of a Legislature directly elected on the basis of universal adult franchise.
2. The federal government should deal with only two subjects: Defence and Foreign Affairs, and all other residual subjects should be vested in the federating states.
3. Two separate, but freely convertible currencies for the two wings should be introduced; or if this is not feasible, there should be one currency for the whole country, but effective constitutional provisions should be introduced to stop the flight of capital from East to West Pakistan. Furthermore, a separate reserve bank should be established and separate fiscal and monetary policy be adopted for East Pakistan.
4. The power of taxation and revenue collection should be vested in the federating units and the federal centre would have no such power. The federation would be entitled to a share in the state taxes to meet its expenditures.
5. There should be two separate accounts for the foreign exchange earnings of the two wings; the foreign exchange requirements of the federal government should be met by the two wings equally or in a ratio to be fixed; indigenous products should move free of duty between the two wings, and the constitution should empower the units to establish trade links with foreign countries.
6. East Pakistan should have a separate military or paramilitary force, and Navy headquarters should be in East Pakistan.

== Reception ==
The proposal was rejected by politicians from West Pakistan and non Awami League politicians from East Pakistan. It was also rejected by Nawabzada Nasarullah Khan, the president of the All Pakistan Awami League. The National Awami Party, Jamaat-e-Islami, and Nizam-e-Islam also opposed the proposal. Despite this opposition, the movement garnered support from the majority of the population of East Pakistan.

== See also ==
- Admiral Ahsan Mission
- Non-cooperation movement (1971)
- North Bengal Province
- Bangladesh–Pakistan Confederation
