= Siddique Salik =

Pakistani soldier, artist, and writer

Brigadier General Siddique Salik TI(M)
- Siddique Salik (1935–88)
- Born: 6 September 1935; Manglia, Kharian Tehsil, Punjab, British India (Present-day in Gujrat, Punjab, Pakistan)
- Died: 17 August 1988 (aged 52); Bahawalpur, Punjab, Pakistan
- Cause of death: 1988 PAF C-130B crash
- Children: 4
- Military career
- Allegiance: Pakistan
- Branch: Pakistan Army
- Service years: 1964–1988
- Rank: Brigadier General
- Nickname: Salik
- Units: Guides Cavalry; Frontier Force
- Commands: DG Inter Services Public Relations; Dir. ISPR East Pakistan
- Conflicts: Indo-Pakistani War of 1965; Bangladesh Liberation War
- Awards: Tamgha-e-Imtiaz (military)
- Other work: Novelist · Memorist · Humorist

Siddique Salik (Punjabi, Urdu: برگیڈیر صدیق سالک) (6 September 1935 – 17 August 1988) was an officer in the Pakistan Army, combat artist, humorist, novelist, and a memoirist who served as 8th Director-General of the Inter-Services Public Relations from 1985 until his death in 1988 in a plane crash in Bahawalpur with the then President. In addition, he also authored two eyewitness books on the Fall of Dhaka which took place in erstwhile East-Pakistan.

== Early life ==
=== Education and military service ===
Siddique Salik was born in a Manglia, a village, located in Kharian Tehsil of Gujrat District, Punjab, British India on 6 September 1935. He hailed from a Jat clan of Punjab and his family was traditionally Peasant who worked in a local farm. He was educated in Lahore, having attended the Islamia College in the Civil Lines in Lahore in 1955.

He graduated with a Bachelor of Arts degree in English literature and later obtained master's degrees' in English literature and international relations from Islamia College in 1960.

After college graduation, he taught British literature in various colleges in Lahore as visiting professor while working as an associate editor for the Associated Press. In 1964, he joined the Pakistan Army when he gained commissioned as a captain in the Guides Cavalry of the Frontier Force. and joined the Inter-Services Public Relations (ISPR) as a War correspondent. In 1969, he was promoted as major while serving as military journalist in the ISPR.

== Personal life ==
Brig. Salik was married and had three daughters and a son. His son, Sarmad Salik, is a political journalist who has worked for PTV News, for ARY News as director of current affairs, Head of Strategy & Planning at TRT World, Senior Analyst of a show called Public Opinion on Public News TV and was the managing director at Indus News, the first international news channel in English from Pakistan.

=== War Appointment and military service in East Pakistan ===
In 1970, Major Salik was posted in Dacca, and became the public relations officer in the ISPR East Pakistan of Eastern Command. Major Salik served as a military media correspondent but soon realized that the separate section of army had begun a successful mutiny and advised for the formation of truth and reconciliation commission to end the bloodshed, though his advises were not heeded.

He joined the senior military staff at the GHQ Dacca as a Public Relations Officer, working to release official statements made by the Eastern Command that was led by its Commander East, Lieutenant-General Tikka Khan, and later A.A.K. Niazi. On 20 December 1971, he was taken POW by the Indian Army when Commander Eastern Command Gen Niazi signed the instrument of surrender and was flown to Calcutta to be imprisoned in the military barracks along with Niazi and Admiral Sharif. While imprisoned, he was described by the Indian Army's officials as "intelligent, indefatigable, and admirable who was ignored by Niazi and others."

About the war prisoners, Major Salik reportedly maintained that most of the war prisoners were given to believe that in two-to-three months, they will be repatriated back to Pakistan via trains to Wagha and ships to Karachi port. However, these hopes were dashed when the prisoners had to wait years to be repatriated to Pakistan.

=== Witness to Surrender and Inter-Services Public Relations ===
Under the population transfer agreement signed between India, Pakistan, and Bangladesh, Major Salik returned to Pakistan when he was repatriated by Indian Army to the Pakistan Army in 1973. Major Salik testified against AAK Niazi during the interviewing process of the War Enquiry Commission. Major Salik continued his military service and remained associated with the Inter-Services Public Relations, working on the public relations. During this time, he began working towards writing the memoirs and book that would recounts the events of the 1971 India-Pakistan war, which he titled "Witness to Surrender."

In 1977, Major Salik was promoted as Lieutenant-Colonel and published his book despite reservation within the military in 1979. The book has its significance and considered an eyewitness report on the genocide committed under the responsibility of Pakistani military and the Mukti Bahini (lit. Freedom Army), since the War Report was never declassified.

Lieutenant-Colonel Salik also published the Urdu version of the book, title as: ميں نے ڈھاكه ڈوبتے ديكھا (lit. Witness to Surrender) in 1986, which was a translation of his English text. In his book, Salik presented a view of soldiers and sailors serving in the army and navy in a crucial period of insurgency and the politics that revolved around the Yahya administration, which eventually led to the independence of Bangladesh.

In 1979, Salik joined the army staff at the Army GHQ as public relations officer, and began working as speechwriter for President Zia-ul-Haq. In 1981, he was promoted to colonel in the army, and during this time, he remained in charge of the Ministry of Information and Broadcasting, though he was not appointed minister. In 1982, Salik was permanently appointed as Press secretary for President Zia at the Army GHQ. In 1985, he was promoted as brigadier, and was appointed Director-General of Inter-Services Public Relations when his appointment was approved by then-vice army chief General K.M. Arif.

During his tenure at Inter-Services Public Relations, he became widely known in the public circles in country when he acted as the principal source of information on Pakistani military deployment in response to the Indian Army's massive military exercise.

On 17 August 1988, Brig Salik was among those who died in a mysterious plane crash while he was traveling with President Zia and American ambassador Arnold Lewis Raphel; he was buried in his local village with full military honors.

=== Authorship, memoirs, and family ===
During his lifetime, Brig. Salik authored 9 books on military and politics; of which, six were written in Urdu and three were written in English. In 1974, he wrote and published his first memoir, "Hamah Yārān̲ Dozak̲h̲", that recorded his life spent as war prisoner under the Indian Army. His book and novels also included:

- Hamah Yārān̲ Dozak̲h̲ (1974)
- Witness to Surrender (ISBN 81-7062-108-9, 1977)
- Ta damay tehreer (1981)
- Main ne Dhakah dubte dekha (1986)
- Pressure Cooker (1983)
- Wounded pride: the reminiscences of a Pakistani prisoner (1984)
- Emergency (1985)
- Salute: An autobiography (1986)
- State and Politics: A Case Study of Pakistan (1987)

His novel, Ta damay tehreer, is a contemporary satire which provides humor while discussing the political events in his country.

== See also ==
- Military in the media
- War artist
- Military journalism
