= Rao Farman Ali =

Pakistani general

Rao Farman Ali Khan SQA SK
- راؤ فرمان علی
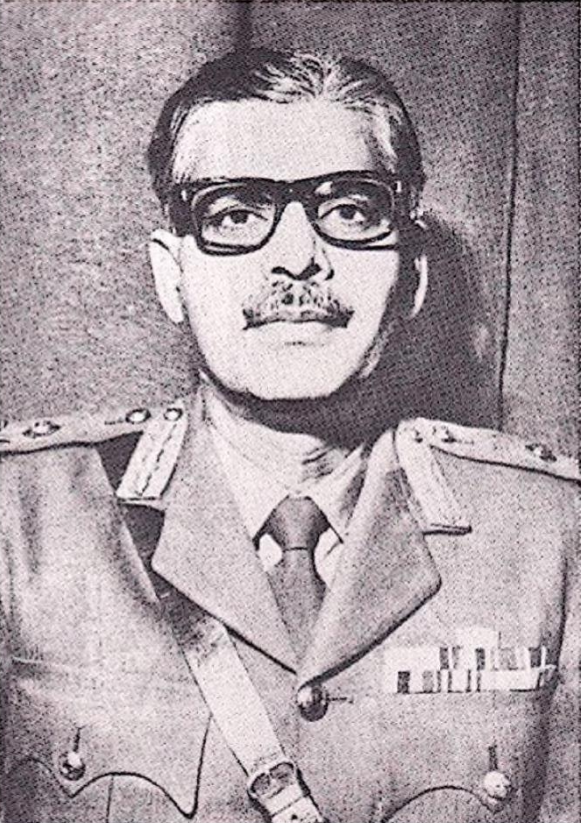
- Official Military Portrait c. 1971

Minister of Petroleum and Natural Resources
- In office 23 March 1985 – 29 May 1988
- President: Zia-ul-Haq
- Prime Minister: Muhammad Khan Junejo

3rd National Security Advisor
- In office 29 March 1985 – 17 August 1988
- Preceded by: Tikka Khan
- Succeeded by: Tariq Aziz

Managing Director of Fauji Foundation
- In office 1974–1985

Personal details
- Born: Rao Farman Ali Khan; 1 January 1923 Rohtak, Punjab, British Raj (Present-day Haryana, India)
- Died: 20 January 2004 (aged 81) Rawalpindi, Punjab, Pakistan
- Profession: Bureaucrat

Military service
- Allegiance: British India; Pakistan
- Branch/service: British Indian Army (1935–1947); Pakistan Army (1947–1972)
- Years of service: 1943—1972
- Rank: Major General
- Unit: Regiment of Artillery
- Battles/wars: World War II; Indo-Pakistani war of 1965; Bangladesh Liberation War; Operation Searchlight; Indo-Pakistani war of 1971
- Awards: Sitara-i-Quaid-e-Azam; Sitara-i-Kidmat
- Service number: PA – 1364

Rao Farman Ali Khan SQA SK (Urdu: راؤ فرمان علی ; 1 January 1923 – 20 January 2004) was a Pakistani two-star rank general who is widely considered complicit in the Rayer Bazar killings during the Bangladesh Liberation War.

Farman oversaw the deployment of local militias (razakars) during the Bangladesh Liberation War in 1971. He testified his responsibilities in the Hamoodur Rahman Commission in 1972 but denied allegations of genocide committed in Bangladesh in spite of the Hamoodur Rahman Commission which proved the involvement of misconducts and genocide of Pakistani military personnel.

Upon retirement, he joined the Fauji Foundation and later headed the Fauji Fertilizer Company Limited in 1978. From 1985–88, he served as petroleum minister and National Security Advisor in President Zia-ul-Haq's administration, and went into hiding after Zia's death.

Farman authored a book titled How Pakistan Got Divided.

== Biography ==
Rao Farman Ali Khan was born into a Rajput family in Rohtak, East Punjab, then under the British Colonial rule in 1923. His date of birth is 1 January 1923, according to the official headstone written in Urdu in his grave which is located in the Westridge cemetery in Rawalpindi.

He was commissioned as a second lieutenant in the Regiment of Artillery of the British Indian Army during the World War II in 1943. After the partition of British India in 1947, he opted to join the Pakistan Army.

He was in East Pakistan from 28 February 1967 to 25 March 1969. In this time, he was commander of the 14th Division's artillery. On the promulgation of martial law on all over Pakistan by Gen. Yahya Khan, Farman was appointed as the Brigadier (Civil Affairs) in the office of the Zonal Administrator of martial law in East Pakistan and was later promoted to Maj. Gen. while remaining in the same post. From 4 July 1971 to 3 September 1971 he functioned under the designation of Major General (Political Affairs) and from the latter date to 14 December 1971 he worked as adviser to the Governor of East Pakistan.

He enjoyed the full support of President Yahya Khan serving under several governors and oversaw various civil affairs in the government. He helped raise the paramilitary units such as the Volunteers (Razakars), Peace Committee, Al Badr, and Al Shams to aid the genocide of the Pakistan army.

In 1971, when the talks with Awami League failed, Ali along with Lieutenant-General Tikka Khan launched the military crackdown on the people of erstwhile East Pakistan under direction of President Yahya Khan. Ali was held responsible for the massacre of Bengali intellectuals that took place in the Dhaka University. Hamoodur Rahman Commission though heavily criticized other senior military staff of Pakistan Army in East Pakistan at the time including confirmation of mass atrocities, cleared Ali citing the fact that he was not involved in any direct Military Operation due to the nature of his post which was mostly Administrative.

Altaf Gohar, an East Pakistani civil servant, recounted that a friend told him a hit list had been drawn up for elimination of certain Bangalis. The friend asked Gohar if he could do something to save Sanaul Haque, whose name was on the list. Gohar asked an acquaintance who knew Farman to persuade Farman to drop that name from the list. "Farman took out", said Gohar, "a list from the drawer and cut off the name".

Pages of this very diary with lists of intellectuals were recovered from the debris of Rao Farman's office, the then Governor's House, which was bombed by the Indian Air Force on 14 December. A note book was found in Rao Farman Ali's office in Dhaka, One page contained a list of university teachers with addresses, with tick marks besides some of the names like "M. Haider Chy. Bangali" or "Saduddin-Sociology, 16-D, UQ" (university quarter). It was up to the readers to find out the reality of this page, and the meaning of the marks, bearing in mind that the last entry was most probably on 13 December.

After the civil war in 1971 ended, Farman's diary was recovered from the ruins of the Governor's house. A page from the diary showed a list of intellectuals. In 1971, he, along with Lieutenant-General Amir Abdullah Khan Niazi, sent a telegram to the U.S. Embassy in Dacca to transmit the surrender proposal to New Delhi. Farman Ali also sent a request for a cease-fire to the United Nations, but it was quickly countermanded by a message from President Yahya Khan which described Farman Ali's request as "unauthorized".

About the Bangladesh Liberation War, General Niazi maintained that Farman requested the latter on multiple occasions to station him back to Pakistan after Farman's gained notoriety over his involvement in the killing of the intellectuals. A.A.K. Niazi wrote in his book, "The Betrayal of East Pakistan that Farman had quoted: "Mukti Bahini would kill him of his alleged massacre of the Bangalees and intellectuals on the night of 15–16 December. It was a pathetic sight to see him pale and almost on the verge of break down." He is also alleged to have written in his Diary as: "Green Land of East Pakistan will be painted Red." However, Farman Ali had denied all the accusations leveled against him, and branded these accusations as "lies".

In 1972, Ali testified against A.A.K. Niazi in the Hamoodur Rahman Commission and noted that Niazi's morale collapsed as early as 7 December and cried fanatically over the progress report presented to the Abdul Motaleb Malik. Controversy regarding his own involvement in the political events of East had arisen since he had denied all accusations leveled against him despite testifying his responsibilities.

Farman Ali was forcefully retired from the military in 1972 but appointed as managing director of Fauji Foundation in 1974 which he remained in that position until 1984. He founded the Fauji Foundation and helped create the chemical fertilizer and served as the first director of the Fauji Fertilizer Company in 1978. In 1985, he was appointed as Minister of Petroleum and Natural Resources and National Security Advisor in President Zia-ul-Haq's administration, which he served until 1988.

After the sudden death of President Zia-ul-Haq, Farman Ali reportedly went into hiding and lived a very quiet life in Rawalpindi on a pension. Throughout the 1990s, he fought a brief illness and authored a book, Sar Gazisht, based on the East Pakistan crises. On 20 January 2004, Farman Ali died and was laid to rest with military honors in Westridge cemetery in Rawalpindi, Punjab, Pakistan.

== Awards and decorations ==
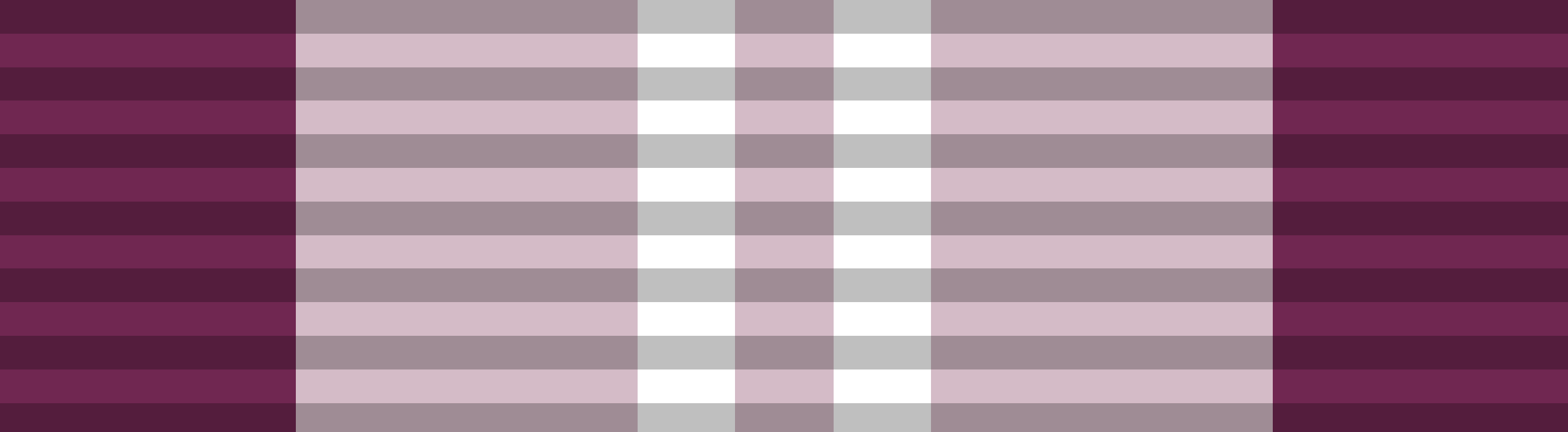

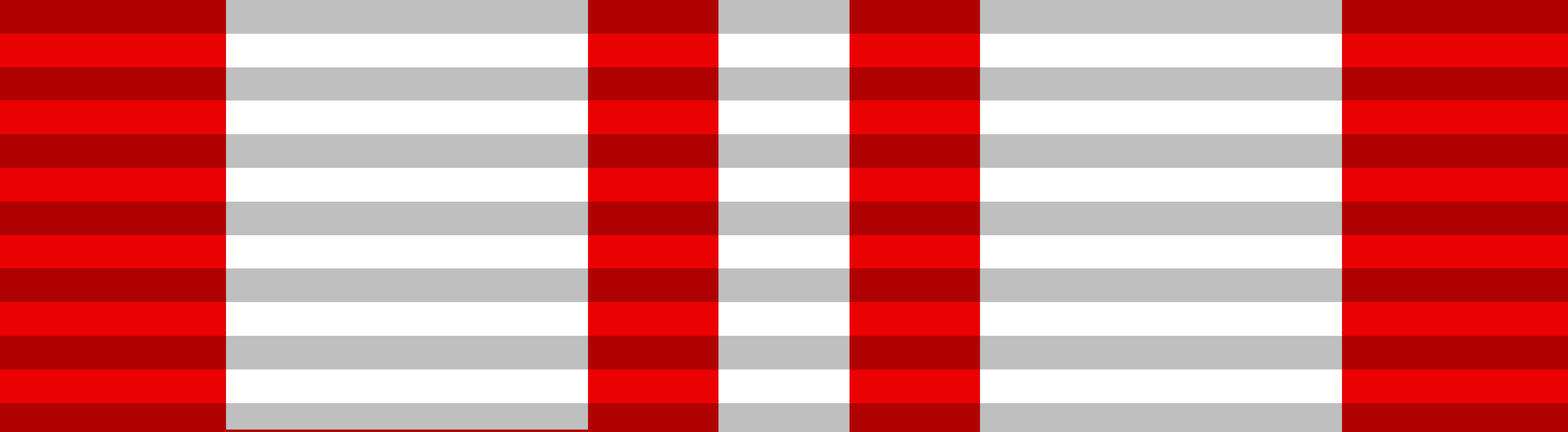

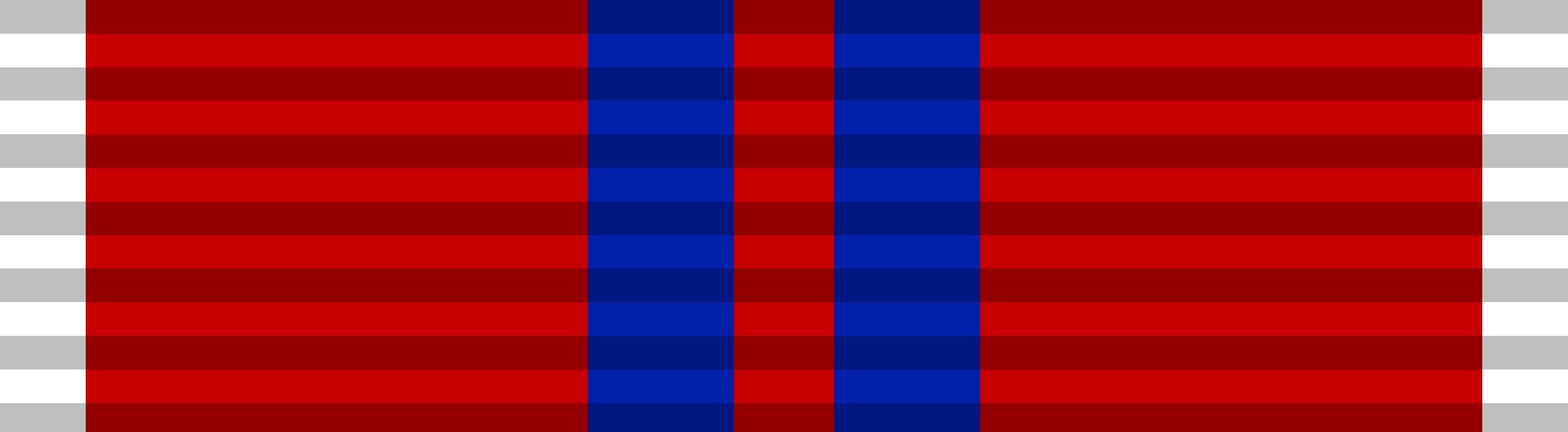

| Sitara-e-Quaid-e-Azam (SQA) | | Sitara-e-Khidmat (SK) | |
| Tamgha-e-Diffa (General Service Medal): 1. 1965 War Clasp; 2. 1971 War Clasp | Tamgha-e-Jang 1965 War (War Medal 1965) | Tamgha-e-Jang 1971 War (War Medal 1971) | Pakistan Tamgha (Pakistan Medal) 1947 |
| Tamgha-e-Jamhuria (Republic Commemoration Medal) 1956 | Burma Star | War Medal 1939-1945 | Queen Elizabeth II Coronation Medal (1953) |

=== Foreign decorations ===
Foreign Awards
| UK | Burma Star |
| UK | War Medal 1939-1945 |
| UK | Queen Elizabeth II Coronation Medal |

== See also ==
- Bangladesh Liberation War
- 1971 killing of Bengali intellectuals
