= Hamoodur Rahman Commission =

Pakistani judicial inquiry after the 1971 Bangladesh War of Independence

Pakistan in Asia: Pakistan's historical map before or prior to 1971. 1. West Pakistan 2. East Pakistan

The Hamoodur Rahman Commission (otherwise known as War Enquiry Commission), was a judicial inquiry commission that assessed Pakistan's political–military involvement in East-Pakistan from 1947 to 1971. The commission was set up on 26 December 1971 by Zulfiqar Ali Bhutto the then President of Pakistan and chaired under Chief Justice Hamoodur Rahman.

Constituted to prepare strictly germane report on "full and complete account of the circumstances surrounding the atrocities and 1971 war", including the "circumstances in which the Commander of the Eastern Military Command, surrendered the Eastern contingent forces under his command laid down their arms."

The commission's final report was very lengthy and provided an analysis based on extensive interviews and testimonies. Its primary conclusion was very critical of the role of Pakistan's military interference, the misconduct of politicians as well as the intelligence failures of the Inter-Services Intelligence (ISI) and the Federal Investigation Agency (FIA), which permitted the infiltration of Indian agents all along the borders of East Pakistan.

Originally, there were 12 copies of the report. These were all destroyed; except the one that was handed over to Government who disallowed its publication at the time. In 2000, parts of the commission report were leaked to Indian and Pakistani newspapers.

The full report was thought to be declassified by the government in 2000, along with other reports concerning the year 1971. However, it was reported that the supplementary report based on testimonies of prisoners of war (POWs) was published, and the key portion of the report concerning the political and military issues remained classified and marked as "Top secret."

== Historical background ==
=== Formation of commission ===
In 1971, East Pakistan seceded from Pakistan and declared independence as Bangladesh. The resulting civil war ended with the signing of a Pakistani surrender after the military intervention of India.

Upon consolidating the power, President Zulfikar Ali Bhutto announced to form the Commission under the Supreme Court's senior justices in December 1971. Constituted upon the request from the President, the Commission conducted evaluated and analytical studies to inquire into and find out "the circumstances in which the Commander, Eastern Command, surrendered and the members of the Armed Forces of Pakistan under his command laid down their arms and a ceasefire was ordered along the borders of West Pakistan".

Initially, the commission was known as the War Enquiry Commission but gained notability as "Hamoodur Rehman Commission" across the country. The commission was led by its chairman, Chief Justice Hamoodur Rahman (a Bengali jurist), aided with the senior justices of the Supreme Court, and military officials as its advisers.

The commission had consisted of both civilian and military officials that investigated the political and military failures based on the interviews and testimonies provided by the POWs, politicians, activists, military leaders, and journalists for two years. The commission submitted its final report in 1974.

=== Commission members ===
- Supreme Court of Pakistan
  - Chief Justice Hamoodur Rahman (chairman)
  - Senior Justice Anwarul Haq (vice-chairman)
  - Senior Justice Tufail Rahman (chief justice of Sindh High Court)
  - Two additional members from Baluchistan High Court
  - Lieutenant-General (retired) Altaf Qadir was its military adviser.

=== Interviewees and testimonies (1972–74) ===
The commission interviewed and stored testimonies in both first and supplementary reports. In 1972, it was reported that around 213 officials were interviewed and testified, including Yahya Khan and Zulfikar Ali Bhutto. In 1974, the Commission again resumed its work and interviewed 300 freed POWs and recorded 73 more bureaucrats' testimonies that served on government assignments in East Pakistan.

- Yahya Khan (1972)
- Zulfikar Ali Bhutto (1972)
- Abdul Hamid Khan (1972)
- Gul Hasan (1972)
- A. O. Mitha(1972)
- Nurul Amin (1972)
- Abdul Rahim Khan (1972)
- Leslie Mungavin (1972)
- Tikka Khan (1972)
- Muzaffar Hassan (1972)
- Mitty Masud (1972)
- S. M. Ahsan (1972)
- Amir Abdullah Khan Niazi (1975)
- Rao Farman Ali (1974)
- Mohammad Shariff (1974)
- Patrick Desmond Callaghan (1974)
- Siddique Salik (1974)
- Mansurul Haq (1974)

Note that the list of interviewees is incomplete.

== First report ==
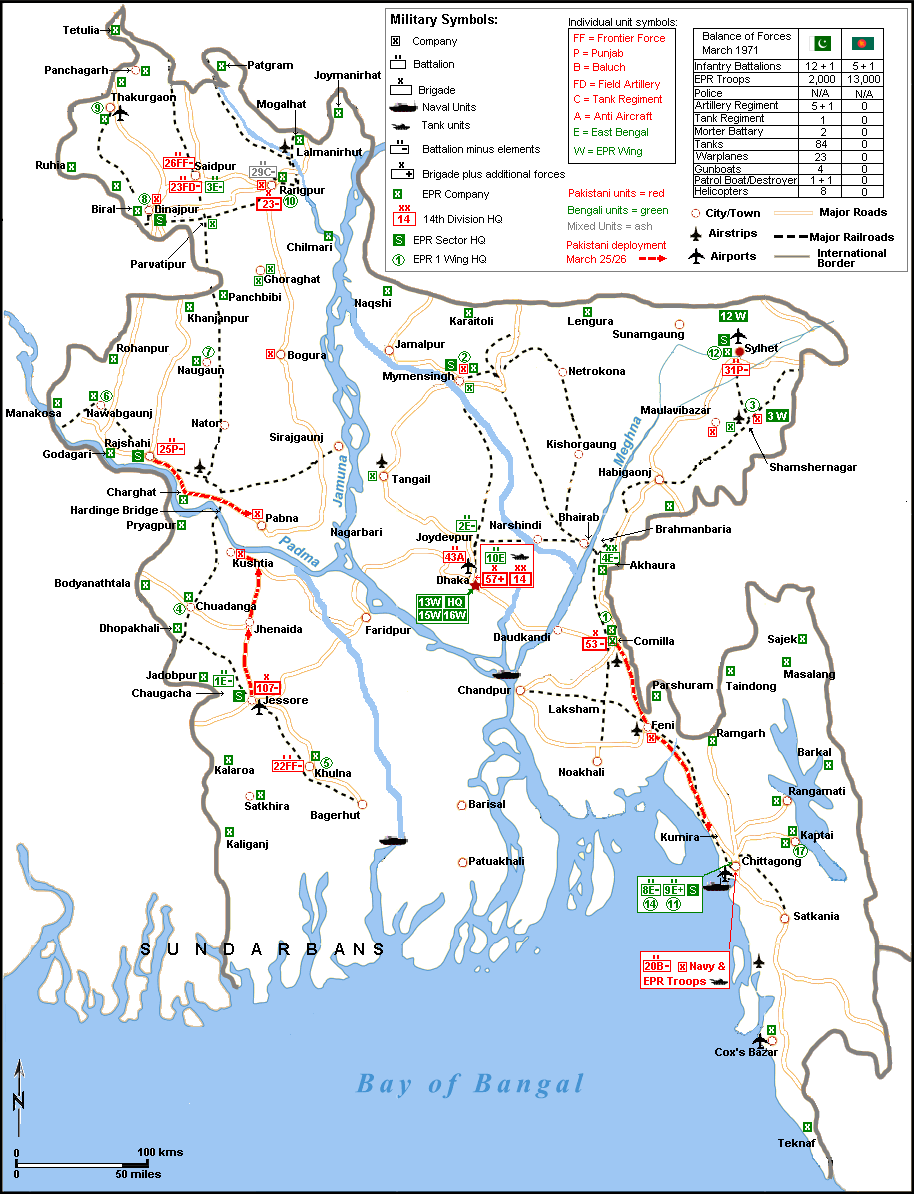
The M.I map of insurgents and military activities in East Pakistan, provided by Brig Siddique Salik in Witness to Surrender.

In July 1972, President Zulfikar Ali Bhutto reviewed the First report submitted by Chief Justice Hamoodur Rahman. The Commission interviewed 213 persons of interest that included former president Yahya Khan, Nurul Amin, Abdul Hamid Khan (Chief of Army), Abdul Rahim Khan (Chief of Air Force), Muzaffar Hassan (Chief of Navy), Bhutto, senior commanders, activists, journalists, and various political leaders.

The Commission considered this initial report as "tentative" as it had not been able to interview many key people who were at that time POWs in India. The Commission stated: "our observations and conclusions regarding the surrender in East Pakistan and other allied matters should be regarded as provisional and subject to modification in the light of the evidence of the Commander, Eastern Command, and his senior officers as and when such evidence becomes available." Initially, the commission interviewed 213 people and made 12 copies of the report. One of the copies was given to President Bhutto and the rest were either destroyed or were stolen. The first report recognized the atrocities and systematic massacre at the Dhaka University which eventually led to recommendations of holding public trials for civilian bureaucrats and field courts-martial for the senior staff officers.

It has been theorized that the first report is so critical of the Pakistan Army's actions in East Pakistan that publication could have weakened the army's influence. The first report also made many insightful recommendations for reorganizing the military physicals, tradition, and their syllabus and training agenda as well as promoting the sense of democratization environment in the political system of the country.

The first report is never published and kept as highly classified documents because of its potentially adverse effects on the military's (at that time) low-institutional morale and fear of a backlash. The government and Zulfikar Ali Bhutto himself maintained that the first report was classified to "save its [the military's] honour".

== Supplementary report ==
In 1974, the Commission reopened its enquiry offering an opportunity to the prisoners of war who had been freed by India and Bangladesh by then and others repatriated from East Pakistan to furnish such information as might be within their knowledge and relevant to the purposes of the commission.

Commission held an informal meeting at Lahore on 3 June 1974 to consider various preliminary matters and then decided to resume proceedings at Abbottabad from 16 July 1974. After the investigation resumed in 1974 the commission interviewed with seventy–three more East Pakistani bureaucrats and high-ranked military personnel.

The Commission examined nearly 300 witnesses in total, hundreds of classified documents and military signals between East and West Pakistan. The supplementary report is heavily based on testimonies provided by the returning POWs and their families but held the military responsible for the atrocities committed in East Pakistan in 1971.

The commission also held that the families of West Pakistani service members in East Pakistan were subjected to inhumane treatment by Bengalis. Returning western Pakistanis and the Biharis told the commission of awful tales of the atrocities committed at the hands of the Awami League militants– the Mukti Bahini.

The final report, also called the supplementary report, was submitted on 23 October 1974, showed how political, administrative, military and moral failings were responsible for the surrender of Pakistani forces in East Pakistan. It remained classified and its contents were guessed from the revealing of different military officers. The report was organized into Five Chapters and an annexure.

1. Chapter One – The Moral Aspect
2. Chapter Two – Alleged atrocities by the Pakistan Army
3. Chapter Three – Professional Responsibilities of Certain Senior Army Commanders
4. Chapter Four – Conclusions
5. Chapter Five – Recommendations

=== Findings ===
In 1971, Pakistan fought the war with India at two different fronts. China and Burma also visible.

The commission challenged the claims by Bangladeshi authorities that 3,000,000 Bengalis had been killed by the Pakistani military and 200,000 women were raped. The commission put the casualty figure as low as 26,000 killed. The issue is controversial; an independent 2008 study estimated that around 269,000 people perished due to war in 1971 in what is now Bangladesh.

Volume I of the supplementary report dealt with the political background, international relations, and military aspects of the events in 1971. The supplementary report discussed its findings in the light of political events in 1971, military aspects, surrender in East Pakistan and the aspects in morality.

The Commission found that when the tales of slaughtering of Western Pakistanis reached to Pakistani soldiers stationed in East, they reacted violently, and in the process of restoring the authority of the government, committed severe excesses on the local Bengali population.

Both the first and the supplementary report's findings accused the Pakistan Army of carrying out the senseless and wanton arson, killings in the countryside, killing of intellectuals and professionals and burying them in mass graves, killing of officers of East Pakistan Army and soldiers on the pretence of quelling their rebellion, killing East Pakistani civilian officers, businessmen and industrialists, raping a large number of East Pakistani women as a deliberate act of revenge, retaliation and torture, and deliberate killing of members of the Hindu minority.

The report accused the army generals of what it called a "premature surrender" and said the military's continued involvement in running the government after 1958 was one reason for the corruption and ineffectiveness of senior officers. The report maintained that: "Even responsible service officers have asserted before us that because of corruption resulting from such involvement, the lust for wine and women and greed for lands and houses, a large number of senior army officers, particularly those occupying the highest positions, had lost not only their will to fight but also their professional competence." The report said Pakistan's military ruler at the time, General Yahya Khan, who stepped down after Pakistan's defeat in December 1971, "permitted and even instigated" the surrender, and it recommended that he be publicly tried along with other senior military colleagues.

The report accused General Yahya Khan, of being a womanizer and an alcoholic. According to the report "Firm and proper action would not only satisfy the nation's demand for punishment where it is deserved but would also ensure against any recurrence of the kind of shameful conduct displayed during the 1971 war".

=== Recommendations ===
Many insightful recommendations were made by the commission as it recommends to hold the public trial for the President General Yahya Khan, also the Commander-in-Chief and the chief martial law administrator of both East and Pakistan in western side. The Commission found suitable for field Courts-martial for Lieutenant-General Abdul Hamid Khan, Lieutenant-General Gul Hasan, Lieutenant-General SSGM Prizada and Major-General Khudadad Khan, and Major-General A. O. Mitha should be publicly tried for being party to a criminal conspiracy to illegally usurp power from Mohammad Ayub Khan in power if necessary by the use of force. Five additional Lieutenant-Generals and three Brigadier-Generals were recommended to be tried for willful neglect of duty. These were Lieutenant-Generals included A.A.K. Niazi, Mohammad Jamshed, M. Rahim Khan, Irshad Ahmad Khan, B.M. Mustafa and Brigadier-Generals G.M. Baquir Siddiqui, Mohammad Hayat and Mohammad Aslam Niazi.

According to the Commission General Mustafa's offensive plan aimed at the capture of the Indian position of Ramgarh in the Rajasthan area (Western Front) was militarily unsound and haphazardly planned, and its execution resulted in severe loss of vehicles and equipment in the desert.

In the supplementary report section in "Higher Direction of War act" of the HRC report, it strongly called for the establishment of Joint Chiefs of Staff Committee (JCSC) mechanism with headquartered in MoD. Per the act, the JCSC composed of a chairman, the Chief of Naval Staff, the Chief of Army Staff, and the Chief of Air Staff. It was mandated to have a collective responsibility of national defence and mechanism of plans based on joint objectives.

The chairmanship was to be rotated between each inter-services, irrespective of the personal ranks in each service. The commission also stressed for the need of stronger deterrence of the country against the foreign intrusions and makes more thoughtful recommendations about the defense of the country as a whole. The Commission called for restoring the rule of law according to the Constitution and establishing the writ of government through the Constitution.

In the end, the commission opined in the report that the nation would learn the necessary lessons from these tragic events and that effective and early action will be taken in the light of the conclusions reached.

== Aftermath ==
The supplementary report was submitted by Chief Justice Hamoodur Rahman to Prime Minister Zulfikar Ali Bhutto on 23 October 1974. Bhutto classified the report because, according to journalist Salil Tripathi, he was concerned that it would demoralize the military and might trigger unrest therein. In 1976, Rahman asked Bhutto what was being done about the report. Bhutto replied that the report was missing; it was either lost, or stolen, and was nowhere to be found.

Upon hearing the fate of the report, Chief Justice Rahman asked the Chief of Army Staff General Zia-ul-Haq for the apprehension of the report who also commented that the original report is nowhere to be found, and nobody knows where the report actually went missing– either at the Army GHQ or the National Archives of Pakistan.

In the 1990s, the curiosity over the report grew with the News International revealing that the report was suppressed and was held secretly at the Joint Staff HQ in Rawalpindi.

Contents of the report were published by the Dawn and the India Today and rumored to be the first report, in August 2000. However, it was revealed that this was the supplementary report that was presumably published. Soon after the revelation, the India Today willfully suppressed its own publications as if the surrender was its own scandal.

No action was ever taken based on the report, the report was classified and its publication disallowed at the time. Yahya Khan died in 1980, but some of his key colleagues were living in retirement on pensions as of 2000. Tikka Khan, A.A.K. Niazi, and Rao Farman Ali all died in 2004. Trials of Gul Hassan, Abdul Rahim Khan, and Muzaffar Hassan were the only trials held by the Judge Advocate General in the light of the Hamoodur Rahman Commission in 1972.

President Pervez Musharraf reportedly commented in October 2000 that the incidents in 1971 were a political as well as a military debacle, and that calls for the military generals to be tried were not fair. Subsequently, Bangladesh requested a copy of the report. In December 2000, 29 years after the inquiry was completed, the War Report was finally declassified in Pakistan by President Musharraf.

Former Pakistan Chief of Army Staff (COAS) General Qamar Javed Bajwa blamed the 1971 Bangladesh war debacle on the country's politicians. Former Pakistan PM and PTI founder Imran Khan urged the nation to read Hamoodur Rahman Commission Report to know who was responsible for East Pakistan debacle.

== See also ==
- Bangladesh-Pakistan relations
- Bangladesh Liberation War
- Cold War (1962–79)
- International Crimes Tribunal (Bangladesh)
