= Tikka Khan =

Pakistani general (1915–2002)

Tikka Khan HJ HQA SPk
- ٹِکّا خاں
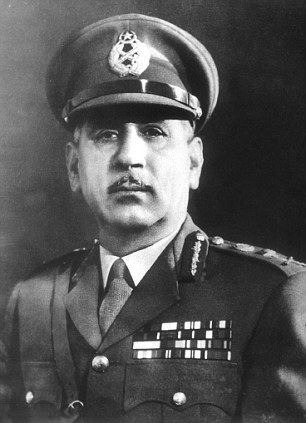
- Official Military portrait, 1972

1st Chief of Army Staff
- In office 3 March 1972 – 1 March 1976
- President: Zulfikar Ali Bhutto; Fazal Ilahi Chaudhry
- Prime Minister: Zulfikar Ali Bhutto
- Preceded by: Gul Hassan (as C-in-C of the Army)
- Succeeded by: Zia-ul-Haq

National Security Advisor
- In office 1 March 1976 – 4 July 1977
- President: Fazal Ilahi Chaudhry
- Prime Minister: Zulfikar Ali Bhutto
- Preceded by: Akbar Khan
- Succeeded by: Rao Farman Ali

13th Governor of East Pakistan
- In office 25 March 1971 – 31 August 1971
- President: Yahya Khan
- Preceded by: Lt-Gen. Yaqub Ali Khan
- Succeeded by: Abdul Motaleb Malik

3rd Commander of Eastern Command
- In office 25 March 1971 – 10 April 1971
- President: Yahya Khan
- Preceded by: Yaqub Ali Khan
- Succeeded by: A.A.K. Niazi

23rd Governor of Punjab
- In office 9 December 1988 – 6 August 1990
- President: Ghulam Ishaq Khan
- Prime Minister: Benazir Bhutto
- Preceded by: S.J. Qureshi
- Succeeded by: Muhammad Azhar

Personal details
- Born: 10 February 1915 Kahuta, Punjab, British India
- Died: 28 March 2002 (aged 87) Rawalpindi, Pakistan
- Resting place: Westridge cemetery
- Party: Pakistan Peoples Party
- Children: 5
- Education: Indian Military Academy
- Civilian awards: List
- Nickname: Butcher of Bengal

Military service
- Allegiance: (British Raj) British India; Pakistan
- Branch/service: (British Raj) British Indian Army (1935–1947); Pakistan Army (1947–1976)
- Years of service: 1935—1976
- Rank: General
- Unit: Regiment of Artillery
- Commands: Eastern Command; IV Corps; II Corps; GOC, 8th Infantry Division; GOC, 15th Infantry Division
- Battles/wars: Second World War; North African campaign; Burma campaign; Second Kashmir War; Operation Desert Hawk; Battle of Chawinda; War in East Pakistan; Operation Searchlight; Indo-Pakistani war of 1971; Fourth Balochistan Conflict
- Military awards: List
- Service number: PA – 124

Tikka Khan (Note: Punjabi: ٹِکّا خاں, romanized: Ṭikkā Khā̃) (10 February 1915 – 28 March 2002) was a Pakistani four-star rank general who served as the first chief of the army staff from 1972 to 1976. He, along with Yahya Khan, is considered a chief architect of the 1971 Bengali genocide, occurring under his governorship over East Pakistan, for which he is referred to as the Butcher of Bengal in Bangladesh.

Gaining a commission in 1940 as an artillery officer in the British Indian Army to participate in World War II, he rose to command the 8th and 15th infantry divisions. In 1969, he was appointed the commander of IV Corps while acting as martial law administrator in West Pakistan under President Yahya Khan. In 1971, he took over the command of army's Eastern Command in East Pakistan and was appointed Governor of East Pakistan, where he oversaw the planning and the military deployments to execute the military operations to quell the liberation war efforts by the Awami League.

After commanding the II Corps in the war with India in 1971, Tikka Khan was promoted to four-star rank and appointed the first chief of army staff of the Pakistan Army in 1972. As an army chief, Tikka Khan provided support to the Pakistan nuclear programme alongside bureaucrat Ghulam Ishaq Khan. Upon retirement from the military in 1976, he was subsequently appointed National Security Advisor by Prime Minister Zulfikar Ali Bhutto, only to be removed in 1977 as a result of enforced martial law. In the 1980s, he remained active as a political worker of the Pakistan Peoples Party (PPP) and emerged as its leader when appointed Governor of Punjab after the general elections held in 1988. His tenure ended when President Ghulam Ishaq Khan dismissed Prime Minister Benazir Bhutto's government in 1990, and he was succeeded by Mian Muhammad Azhar. He retired from politics in 1990. He died on 28 March 2002 and was buried with full military honours in Westridge cemetery in Rawalpindi, Punjab, Pakistan.

== Early life and education ==
Tikka Khan was born on 10 February 1915 into a Punjabi family of the Janjua Rajput clan in the Jochha Mamdot village of Kahuta Tehsil, Rawalpindi District, Punjab, British India (now Punjab, Pakistan).

After his education in Rawalpindi, he joined the Army Cadet College in Nowgong, Madhya Pradesh in 1933 and joined the British Indian Army as a sepoy in 1935; he gained his commission in the army from the Indian Military Academy on 22 December 1940.

During these early years, he was known to be a particularly good boxer. Contemporary accounts described him as "a heavy set man with a British military moustache, a sallow complexion, a pointed chin, and dark brown eyes usually concealed behind dark glasses" while his "boxing experience had given him a misshapen nose, a curious rolling walk and a savage delight in violence."

== Military career ==
=== World War II ===
He participated in World War II and fought with the 2nd Field Regiment, Regiment of Artillery in Libya against the Afrika Korps led by German Field Marshal Erwin Rommel in 1940. He was captured by German troops and held as a POW in Libya for more than a year. After successfully escaping, he saw military action in the Burma campaign against Japan in 1945 where he was wounded and hospitalised for some time. In 1946, he was posted in different parts of India such as Deolali, Mathura, and Kalyan.

During the same time, he served as an instructor at the Indian Military Academy at Dehradun.

=== New beginnings in Pakistan ===
After the efforts of Muslim League culminated in the partition of British India and the creation of Pakistan, Tikka Khan joined the Pakistan Army as a major in the Pakistan Army's Regiment of Artillery in 1947. His military career progressed well and he got accelerated promotions in the army. In 1949, he was promoted to lieutenant colonel. He worked hard to raise the Medium Regiment in the new army. In 1950–54, he was promoted to colonel and became the deputy director at the directorate of artillery in the GHQ.

In 1955, he was promoted to brigadier. In 1962, he was promoted to major general and posted at the GHQ in Rawalpindi.

=== Between the wars: 1965–1971 ===
In 1965, Major-General Tikka Khan was the GOC of the 8th Infantry Division that was positioned in Punjab, Pakistan. At that time, the 8th Infantry Division consisted of the 51st Paratrooper Brigade and the 52nd Infantry Brigade. In April 1965, the 8th Infantry Division intruded into the Rann of Kutch. Hostilities broke out between India and Pakistan and Tikka Khan's 8th Division fought the Indian Army in the Battle of Rann of Kutch. During the war, Tikka Khan earned a reputation as a victor of Rann of Kutch and was credited widely by the Pakistani press for the victories, he gained. He made a bold stand against the Indian Army's encirclement in the Sialkot sector in 1965. He later led the 15th Infantry Division in the Indo-Pakistani war of 1965 which eventually led to a stalemate.

After President Ayub Khan handed over the presidency to his army chief General Yahya Khan in 1969, Tikka Khan was promoted to lieutenant general to command the IV Corps, stationed in Lahore. He was the martial law administrator of Punjab under President Yahya Khan who appointed him after replacing with Attiqur Rahman. His personality was well known in Pakistan as being tough and ruthless. In March 1971, Tikka Khan was sent to Dacca and left the post to Lieutenant General Bahadur Sher in March 1971.

=== Bangladesh Liberation and 1971 war ===
The situation was very complex in both West and East Pakistan after the general elections held in 1970 where the Bengali nationalist Awami League won 167 of the 169 seats in East Pakistan, whereas the leftist-socialist Pakistan Peoples Party (PPP) won 81 seats out of 138 in West Pakistan. By constitutional law, Sheikh Mujibur Rahman of the Awami League was supposed to be the candidate for the post of Prime Minister of Pakistan but Zulfikar Ali Bhutto of the Pakistan Peoples Party was not ready to accept his role as Leader of the Opposition and refused to sit in the National Assembly in this role.

Under pressure by Bhutto and the Pakistan Peoples Party, President Yahya Khan postponed the National Assembly session despite meeting with and inviting the Awami League to form the government on 7 March. Sheikh Mujibur Rahman reacted by calling upon the Bengali people to launch an armed liberation movement against Pakistan at a mass rally. Responding to this, President Yahya Khan accepted the resignation of Lieutenant General Yaqub Khan as governor of East Pakistan and commander of the army's Eastern Command in March 1971 and appointed Lieutenant General Tikka Khan as his successor. Tikka Khan arrived in Dacca the same month and took over the governorship. He assumed command of the Eastern Command on 7 March 1971. He has faced accusations of killing thousands of civilians.

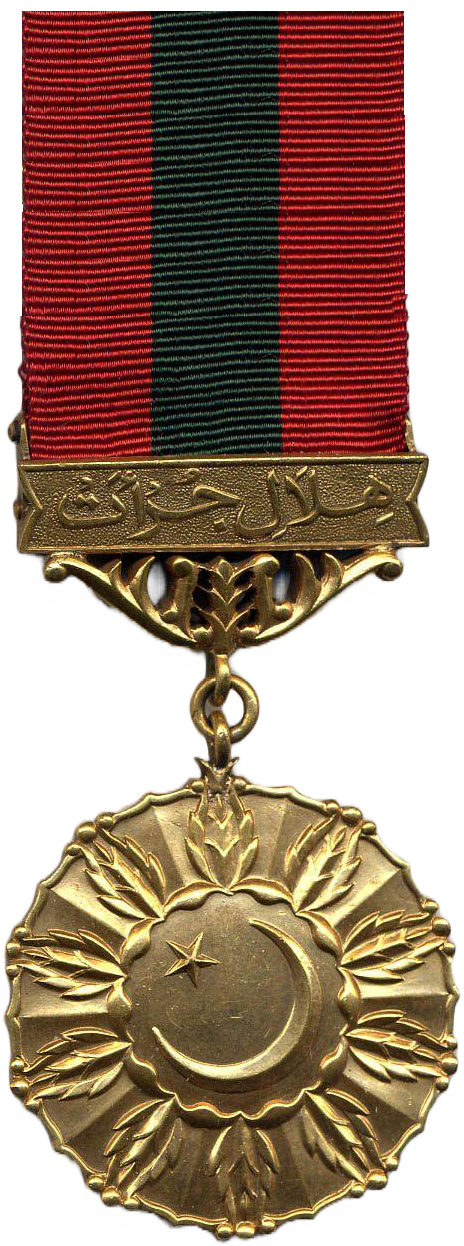
Hilal-e-Jurat

Yahya Khan ordered him to carry out a "district-wise military operation" against the Awami League on the evening of 25 March 1971. Tikka Khan's order to his soldiers was I want the land and not the people. Tikka Khan took assistance from loyal Bengalis and Biharis for the operation and organized a paramilitary force called Razakars. He ordered the arrest of Sheikh Mujibur Rahman, outlawed the Awami League, and ordered a midnight attack on the University of Dhaka. Tikka Khan was the architect and top planner of Operation Searchlight. Thousands were killed in this operation, including academics and other members of civil society, and the country was plunged into a bloody civil war. Fatima Bhutto called him "a soldier known for his eager use of force". He became notorious as the "Butcher of Bengal."

In September 1971, Governor Tikka Khan was replaced with a civilian government led by a governor and a cabinet drawn from different political parties. Tikka Khan was recalled to Pakistan, relinquishing the Eastern Command to Lieutenant General Amir Khan Niazi, and given command of the II Corps based in Multan, Punjab. He commanded the II Corps during the 1971 war with India. Indian Major General D. K. Palit has questioned the wisdom of Tikka Khan's tactics used in the Battle of Chhamb in December, citing high II Corps casualties incurred during Pakistani frontal attacks.

=== Chief of Army staff ===
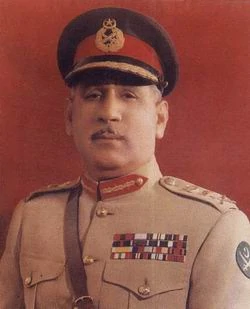
A portrait of Tikka Khan during his tenure as Chief of Army Staff.

In 1972, President Zulfikar Ali Bhutto removed Lieutenant General Gul Hassan Khan from his position as commander-in-chief of the army and replaced him with Tikka Khan. Tikka Khan was a highly unpopular choice in military circles for the chief of army staff because it was felt strongly that he was professionally unprepared for the assignment. On the other hand, Tikka Khan was steadfastly loyal to Bhutto. In 1972, he supported the militarisation of the Pakistan Atomic Energy Commission by supporting Munir Ahmad Khan to take over the commission's chairmanship and the directorship of the clandestine atomic bomb programme. He was implicated in the Hamoodur Rahman Commission's report on the 1971 war with India over East Pakistan, but much of the report remains classified.

In 1974, Tikka Khan led the counterinsurgency military operation in Balochistan and successfully crushed Baloch independence movement. In 1976, he provided his support to Ghulam Ishaq Khan and Bhutto to expand the clandestine nuclear weapons programme. The same year, Tikka Khan was preparing to retire from the military, and evaluated the eight serving lieutenant generals who were his potential successors as chief of army staff. When asked by Bhutto for his opinion on Lieutenant General Muhammad Zia-ul-Haq, Tikka Khan did not recommend him. Tikka Khan later remarked, "I thought he was dull. In any case, he was the most junior of all the eight lieutenant generals." However Bhutto by-passed his recommendations, approved Lieutenant General Zia-ul-Haq to four-star rank, and appointed him as army chief. Upon retirement from the army, Khan joined the Pakistan Peoples Party.

== Political career ==
=== National Security Advisor to Zulfikar Ali Bhutto ===
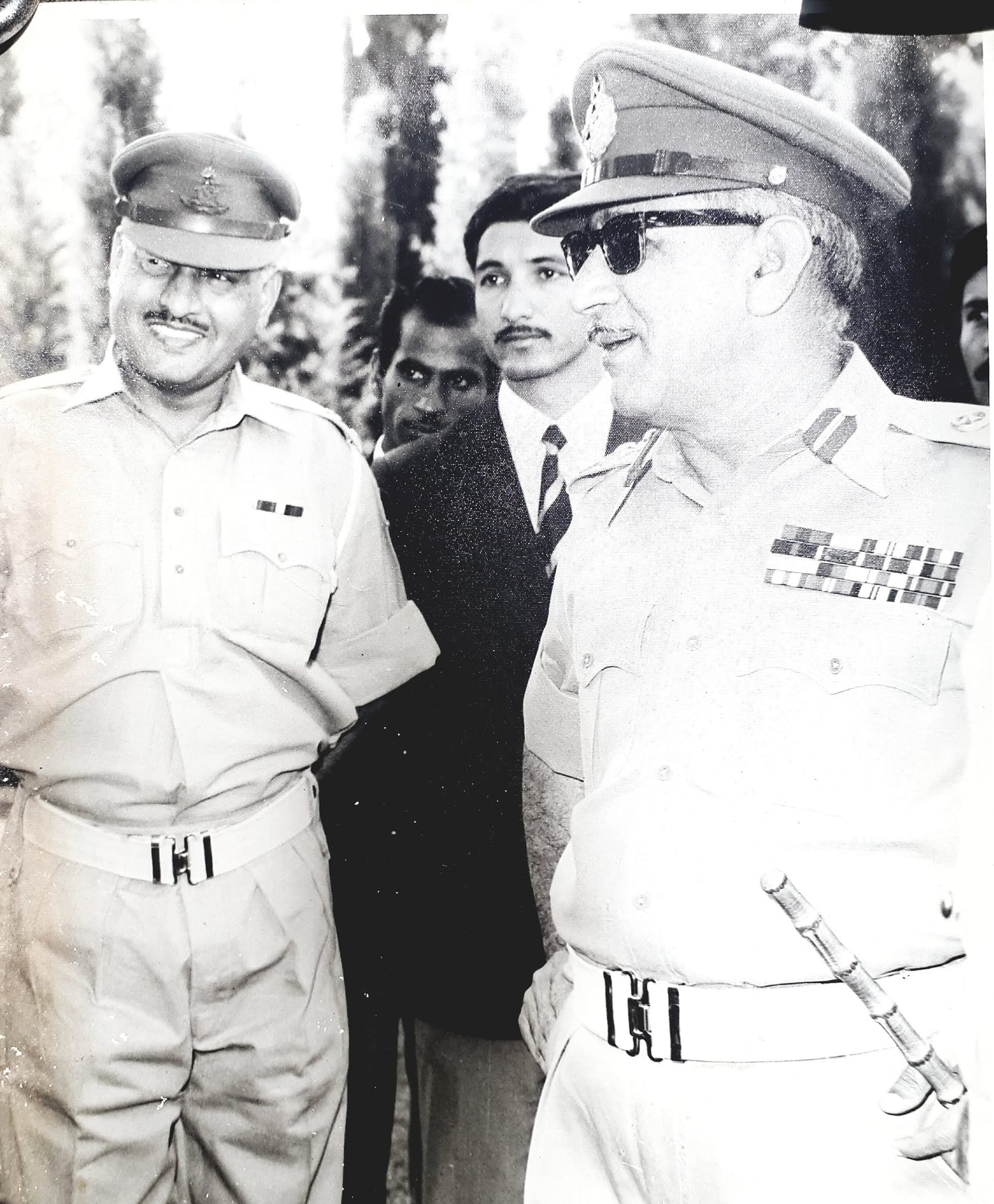
Khan with Mujahid Tareen(middle) in 1974

Tikka Khan was appointed National Security Advisor in 1976 by Prime Minister Zulfikar Ali Bhutto. However, his tenure was short and ended when martial law was imposed by army chief General Muhammad Zia-ul-Haq in 1977. General Zia ordered the military police to arrest both Bhutto and General Tikka Khan and placed them under house arrest. Bhutto was executed in 1979, after which General Tikka Khan emerged as one of the leaders of the Pakistan Peoples Party (PPP), becoming its secretary general.

=== Jail under Zia-ul-Haq ===
In 1980–88, Tikka Khan faced imprisonment numerous times for his political activities until President Zia-ul-Haq died in August 1988 in an aircraft explosion over Bahawalpur. In spite of Tikka's leadership position within the political opposition, many of his army protégés such as Sawar Khan, Iqbal Khan and Rahimuddin Khan were promoted to four-star rank and remained on deferential terms with him. In the 1988 general election, Tikka Khan ran unsuccessfully for a seat representing Rawalpindi.

=== Governor of Punjab under Benazir Bhutto ===
He was appointed the Governor of Punjab by Prime Minister Benazir Bhutto in December 1988. His governorship ended when President Ghulam Ishaq Khan dismissed the government of Prime Minister Benazir Bhutto in August 1990, after which Tikka Khan retired from active politics.

== Later life and death ==
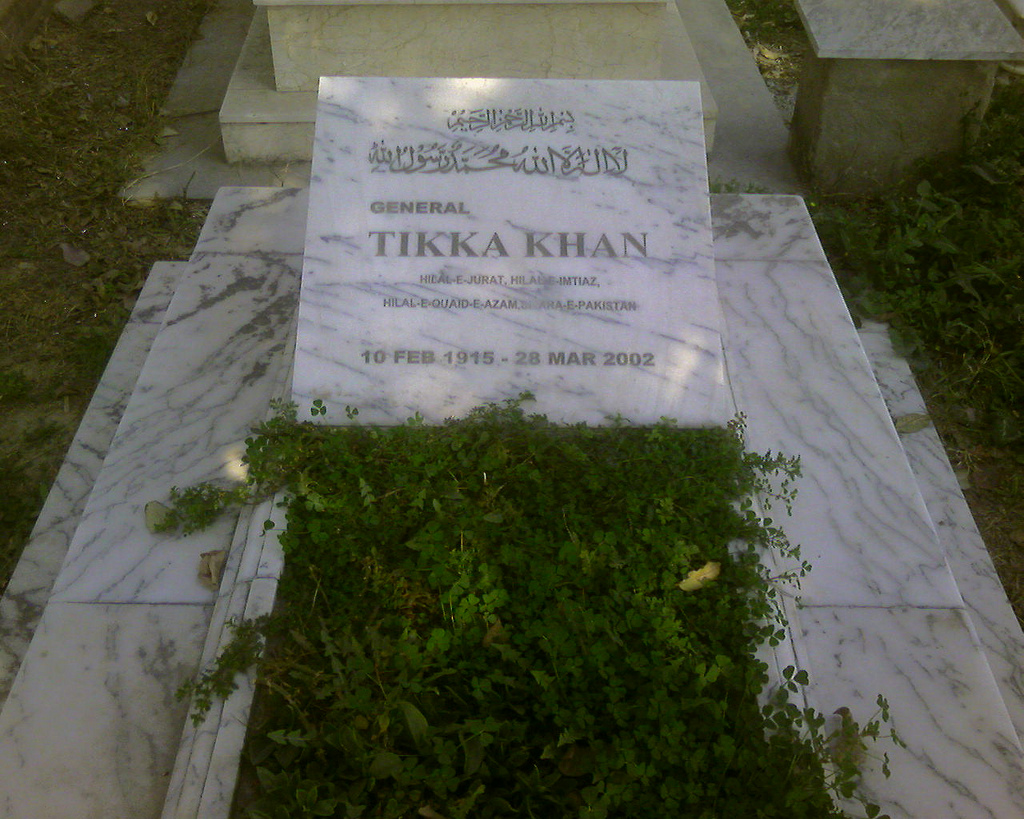
Tikka Khan's grave at Army graveyard, Rawalpindi

Throughout the 1990s, he battled with illness and was hospitalised in CMH Rawalpindi for several years. He refused many television interviews on the subject of the controversial events of 1971 and died on 28 March 2002. He was survived by three sons and two daughters.

He was laid to rest with military honours in the Westridge cemetery in Rawalpindi. Chairman Joint Chiefs of Staff Committee Aziz Khan attended his funeral, accompanied by the Army Chief of Staff, Chief of Air Staff, Chief of Naval Staff and other senior military and civil officials. Former prime minister and PPP chairperson Benazir Bhutto paid Tikka Khan tribute in a message to his son Colonel Khalid Masud; she described the Colonel's father as one who "rose to the highest offices of this country due to his hard work and respect for the rule of law".

== Awards and decorations ==
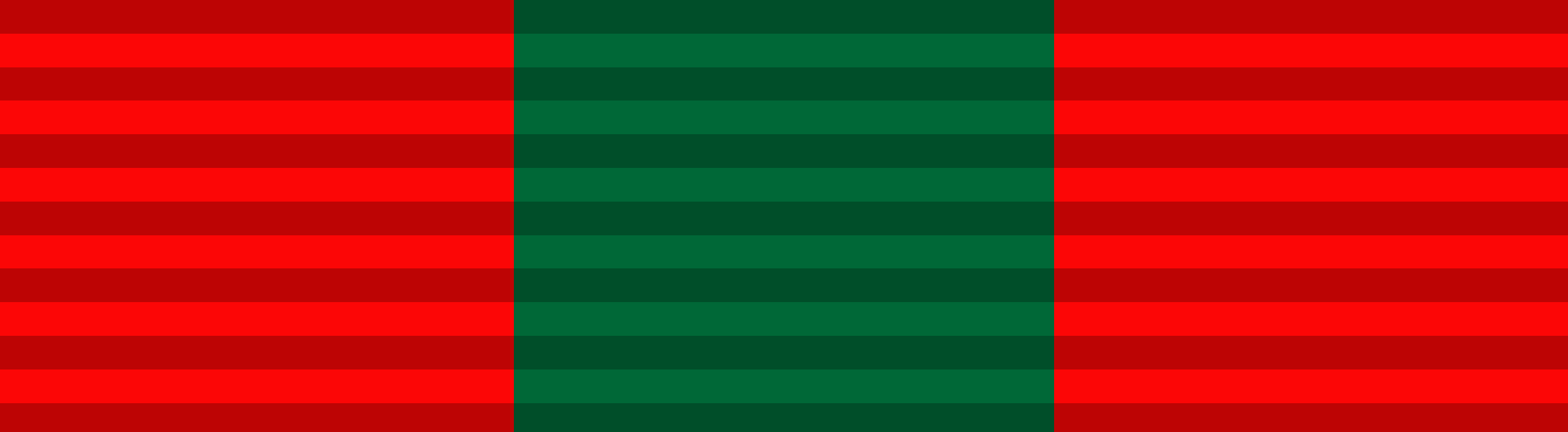

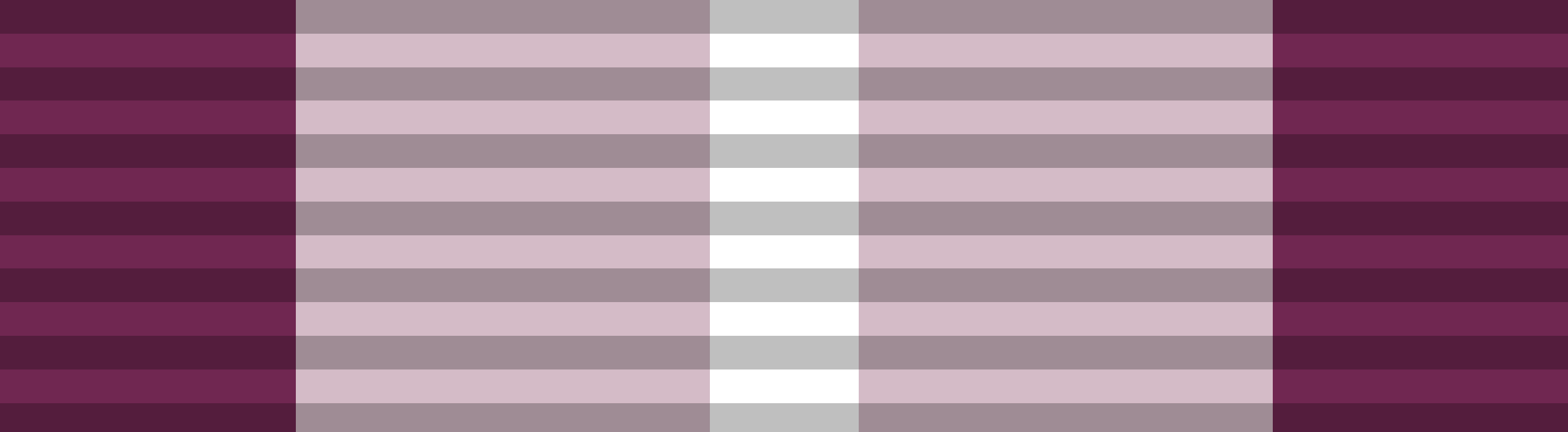

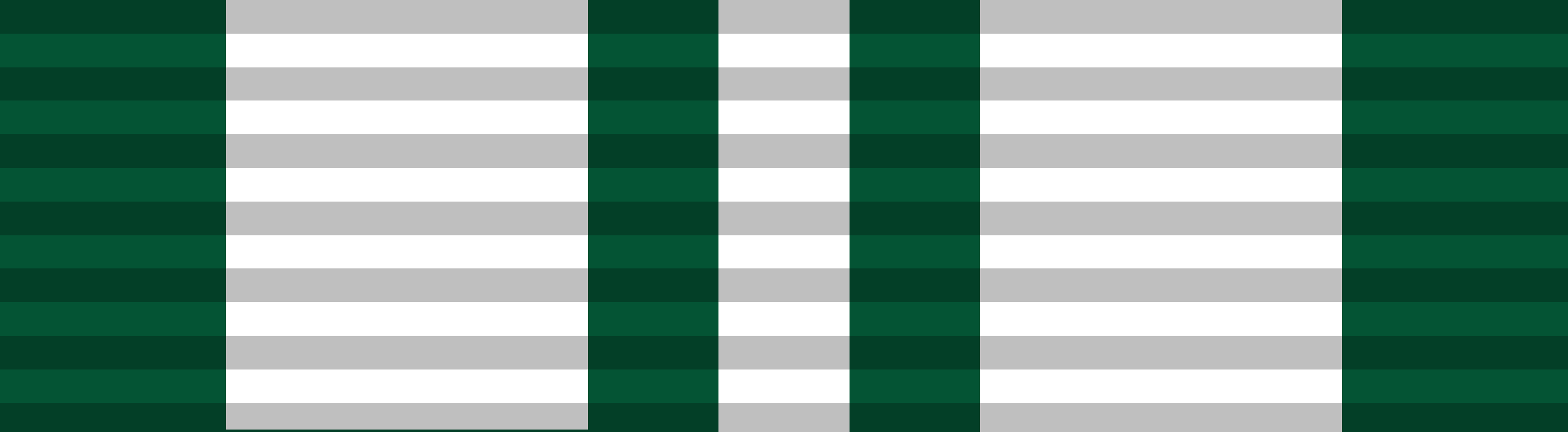

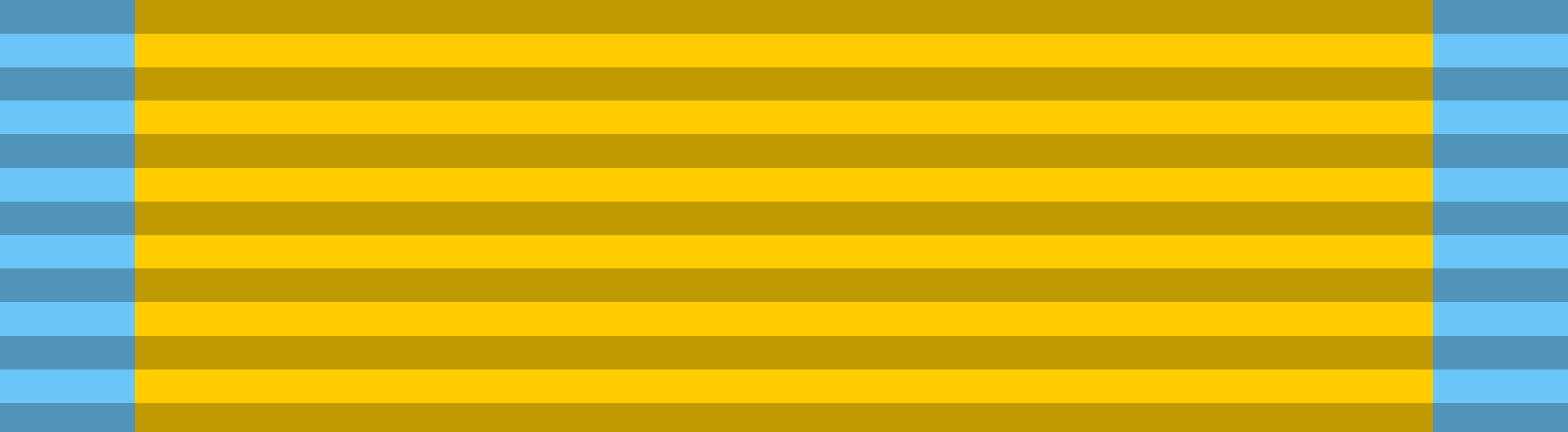

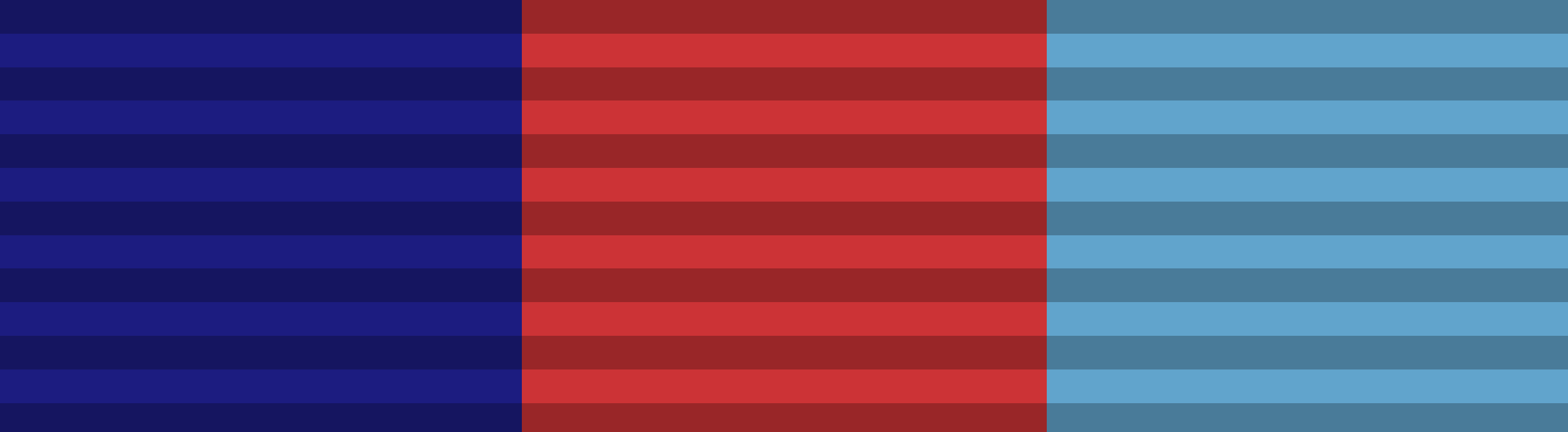

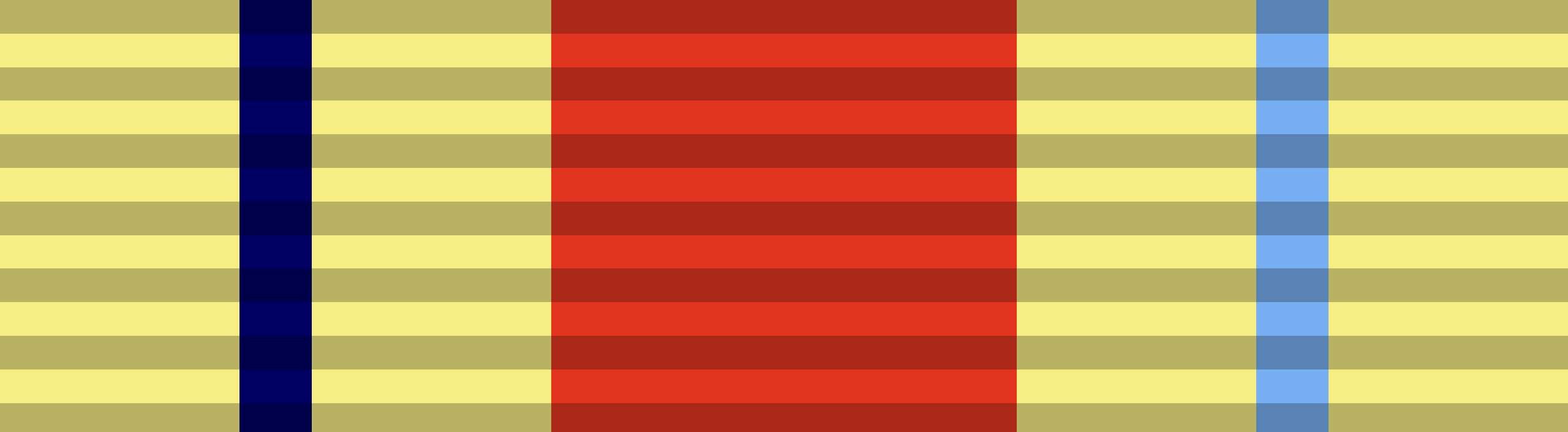

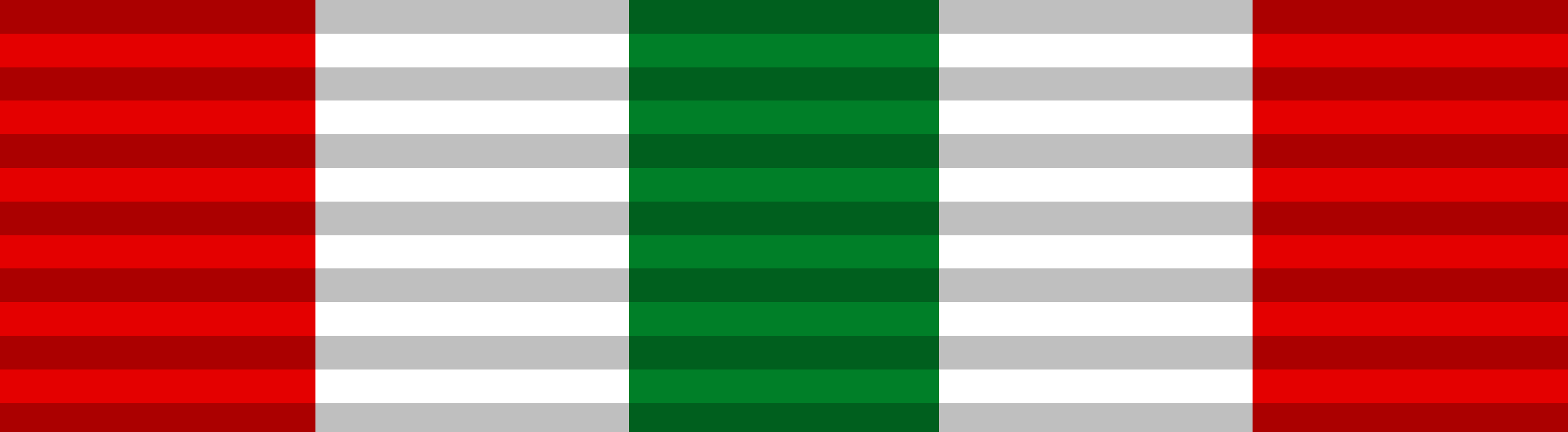

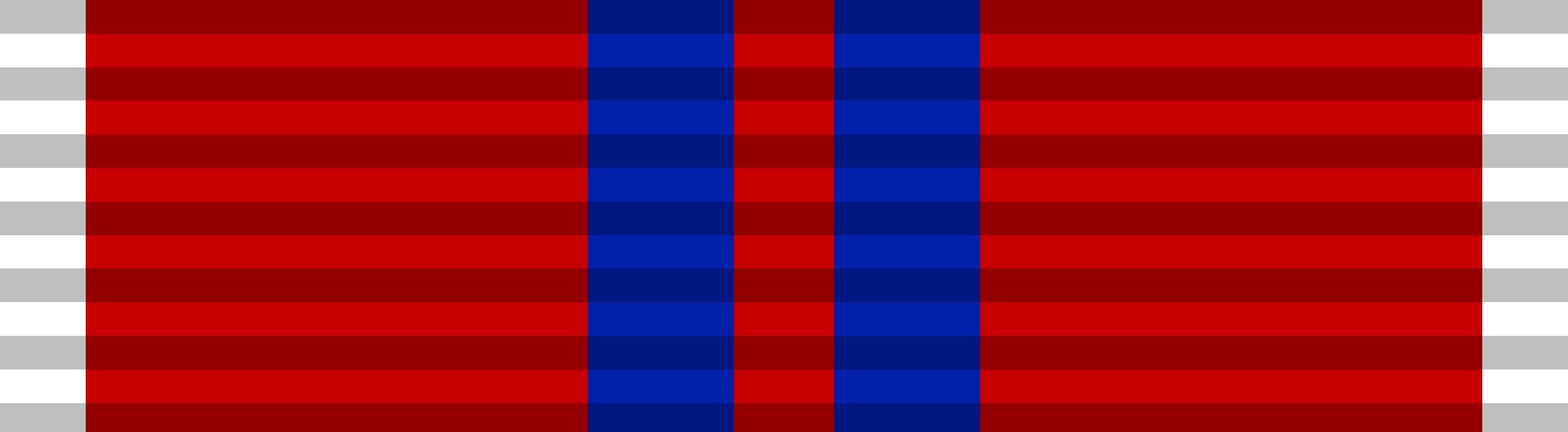

Hilal-e-Jurat (Crescent of Courage) 1971 War		Hilal-e-Quaid-e-Azam (HQA)	
Sitara-e-Pakistan (Star of Pakistan) (SPk)	Tamgha-e-Diffa (General Service Medal): 1. Rann of Kutch Clasp	Sitara-e-Harb 1965 War (War Star 1965)	Sitara-e-Harb 1971 War (War Star 1971)
Tamgha-e-Jang 1965 War (War Medal 1965)	Tamgha-e-Jang 1971 War (War Medal 1971)	Pakistan Tamgha (Pakistan Medal) 1947	Tamgha-e-Jamhuria (Republic Commemoration Medal) 1956
Order of the Crown (Pahlavi Iran)	1939-1945 Star	Africa Star	Burma Star
Italy Star	War Medal 1939-1945	India Service Medal 1939–1945	Queen Elizabeth II Coronation Medal (1953)

=== Foreign decorations ===
Foreign Awards
Imperial Iran	Order of the Crown
UK	1939-1945 Star
UK	Africa Star
UK	Burma Star
UK	Italy Star 1945
UK	War Medal 1939-1945
UK	India Service Medal 1939–1945
UK	Queen Elizabeth II Coronation Medal

== See also ==
- The Blood telegram

== Notes ==
Political offices
Preceded by Attiqur Rahman	Martial Law Administrator of Zone A, (West Pakistan); 1969–1971	Succeeded by Bahadur Sher
Preceded by Attiqur Rahman	Governor of West Pakistan; 1969	Succeeded by Nur Khan
Preceded by Sahabzada Yaqub Khan	Martial Law Administrator of Zone B, (East Pakistan); 1971	Succeeded by Amir Abdullah Khan Niazi
Preceded by Sahabzada Yaqub Khan	Governor of East Pakistan; 1971	Succeeded by Abdul Motaleb Malik
Preceded by Makhdoom Sajjad Hussain Qureshi	Governor of Punjab; 1988–1990	Succeeded by Mian Muhammad Azhar
Military offices
Preceded by Lieutenant General Sahabzada Yaqub Khan	Commander of Eastern Command; 7 March 1971 – 7 April 1971	Succeeded by Lieutenant General Amir Abdullah Khan Niazi
Preceded by Lt. Gen. Gul Hassan Khan as Commander-in-Chief, Pakistan Army	Chief of Army Staff; 1972–1976	Succeeded by Gen. Muhammad Zia-ul-Haq
