= Manglia =

Village in Punjab, Pakistan

Manglia (Urdu: منگلیہ) is a medium-sized village of Kharian Tehsil, Gujrat District, in the Punjab province of Pakistan. It is located at 32°86′N 73°97′E at an altitude of 271.5 metres. Manglia residents comprise many castes, including Syed, Jutt, Awan, Malik, Mughal, and Kasbi.

== Notable people ==
- Brigadier Siddique Salik, Pakistan Army officer, author and humorist
