= A. A. K. Niazi =

Pakistan Army Eastern Commander

Amir Abdullah Khan Niazi HJ & BAR (Note: "Bar" refers to a second award of the same honour.) SPk SK MC
- امیر عبداللہ خان نیازی
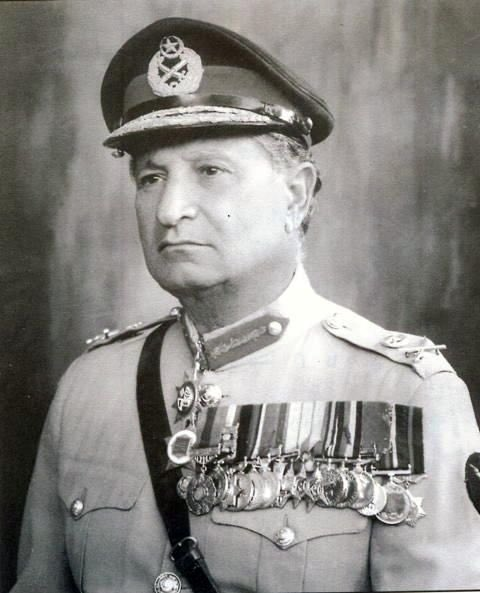
- Official military portrait, 1971.

15th Governor of East Pakistan
- In office 14 December 1971 – 16 December 1971
- President: Yahya Khan
- Prime Minister: Nurul Amin
- Preceded by: Abdul Motaleb Malik
- Succeeded by: Position abolished (Sheikh Mujibur Rahman as President of Bangladesh)

3rd Commander of Eastern Command
- In office 10 April 1971 – 16 December 1971
- President: Yahya Khan
- Prime Minister: Nurul Amin
- Preceded by: Tikka Khan
- Succeeded by: Position abolished

Personal details
- Born: Amir Abdullah Khan Niazi c. 1915 Mianwali, Punjab Province, British India
- Died: 1 February 2004 (aged 88–89) Lahore, Punjab, Pakistan
- Resting place: Military Cemetery, Lahore
- Education: Officers' Training School, Bangalore; Command and Staff College, Quetta

Military service
- Allegiance: British India; Pakistan
- Branch/service: British Indian Army (1942–1947); Pakistan Army (1947–1975)
- Years of service: 1942—1975
- Rank: Lieutenant General
- Unit: Rajput Regiment; Punjab Regiment
- Commands: Eastern Command; GOC, 10th Infantry Division; GOC, 8th Infantry Division; 14th Para Brigade
- Battles/wars: World War II; Burma campaign; Battle of Imphal; Indo-Pakistani War of 1965; Battle of Chawinda; Bangladesh Liberation War; Indo-Pakistani War of 1971
- Awards: Hilal-e-Jurat & Bar; Sitara-e-Pakistan; Sitara-e-Kidmat; Military Cross

Amir Abdullah Khan Niazi HJ & Bar SPk SK MC (1915 – 1 February 2004), commonly known as General Niazi, was a Pakistani three-star rank general who served as the final governor of East Pakistan. Niazi commanded the Eastern Command of the Pakistan Armed Forces during the Bangladesh Liberation War and eventually the India–Pakistan war of 1971. He signed the instrument of surrender as on 16 December 1971, his forces had to surrender to the Indian Army's Eastern Command's commander Lieutenant General Jagjit Singh Aurora by the order of the then President of Pakistan Yahya Khan.

Niazi's area of responsibility comprised the defense of East Pakistan from India during the war in 1971. His surrender in Dhaka effectively ended the war. The result was an Indian victory as well as the independence of Bangladesh.

After being held as a prisoner of war by the Indian military, he was repatriated to Pakistan on 30 April 1975 as part of the Delhi Agreement. He was dishonourably discharged from his military service at the War Enquiry Commission led by Hamoodur Rahman. The Commission held him responsible for human rights violations in East Pakistan, intentional war rapes and the supervision of smuggling efforts during the 1971 war; he was also held responsible for Pakistan's military failure during the course of the conflict. Niazi, however, rejected these allegations and sought a military court-martial while insisting that he had acted according to the orders of the Pakistan Army GHQ in Rawalpindi; the court-martial was never granted.

After the war, he remained active in Pakistani politics and supported an ultra-conservative agenda under the Pakistan National Alliance against the government of Zulfikar Ali Bhutto in the 1970s. In 1998, he authored the book The Betrayal of East Pakistan.

Niazi died in Lahore, Punjab, Pakistan on 1 February 2004.

== Biography ==
=== Early life and British Indian Army career ===
Khan was born in Mianwali, British India, in 1915. A Pashtun but born in Punjab, he belonged to the Niazi tribe. His village, Balo Khel, is located on the eastern bank of the Indus River. After matriculating from a local high-school in Mianwali, he joined the British Indian Army as a "Y cadet" in 1941 as he was selected for an emergency commission in the army, before it he was an ordinary soldier.

He received training in Officers Training School, Bangalore and Fatehgarh's Rajput Regiment's training centre; he was commissioned as an Emergency Commissioned Officer (ECO) in the rank of second lieutenant during the World War II on 8 March 1942 (following a 6 months training) into the 4/7 Rajput Regiment (4th Battalion of the 7th Rajput Regiment) which was then a part of the 161st Indian Infantry Brigade led by Brigadier D.F.W. Warren.

=== World War II and Burma campaigns ===
On 11 June 1942, Lt. Niazi was stationed in the Kekrim Hills located in regions of Assam-Manipur to participate in the Burma front. That spring, he was part of the 14th Army of the British Indian Army commanded by General William Slim.

During this period, the 14th Army had halted the offensive against the Imperial Japanese Army at the Battle of Imphal and elsewhere along the Burma front. General Slim described his gallantry in a lengthy report to General Headquarters, India, about his judgment of the best course of action. At the Burma front in 1944, Lt. Niazi impressed his superior officers when he commanded a platoon that initiated an offensive against the Imperial Japanese Army at the Bauthi-Daung tunnels.

Lt. Niazi's gallantry had impressed his British commanders at GHQ India and they wanted to award him the Distinguished Service Order, but his rank was not high enough for such a decoration. During the campaign, Brigadier D.F.W. Warren, commander of the 161st Indian Infantry Brigade of the British Army, gave Niazi the soubriquet "Tiger" for his part in a ferocious fight with the Japanese. After the conflict, the British government decorated Lt. Niazi with the Military Cross for leadership, judgement, quick thinking and calmness under pressure in action along the border with Burma.

After the end of World War II, in 1945, from an Emergency Commissioned Officer, Niazi was granted a regular commission of the British Indian Army, and he got his service number as IC0-906 (Indian Commissioned Officer-906); he was promoted to captain and sent to attend the Command and Staff College in Quetta which he graduated with a staff course degree under then-Lt. Col. Yahya Khan.

=== Pakistan Army: from major to lieutenant general ===
In 1947, the United Kingdom through the Indian Independence Act 1947, announced their intention of partitioning British India amid the failure of the 1946 Cabinet Mission to India. After the creation of Pakistan in August 1947, Major Niazi decided to opt for Pakistani citizenship and joined the newly established Pakistan Army where his S/No was redesigned as PA–477 by the Ministry of Defence of Pakistan and he joined the Punjab Regiment.

His career in the army progressed well. In the rank of Lt. Col. he served as commanding officer of two battalions in West Pakistan and one in East Pakistan. In 1961, he was promoted as Brigadier and offered discussion on infiltration tactics at the Command and Staff College. Subsequently, he published an article on infiltration and promoted talks on military-supported local rebellion against the enemy. He served as the commander of 51st Infantry Brigade in Karachi and was decorated with the Sitara-i-Khidmat (lit. Service Star) for his contributions and service with the army. His leadership credentials had led him to be appointed martial law administrator of both Karachi and Lahore to maintain control of law in the cities of West Pakistan during this time. Shortly after, he was appointed as the commandant of School of Infantry and Tactics in Quetta.

Brigadier Niazi went on to participate in the Indo-Pakistani War of 1965, the second war with India. He was appointed as the commander of 14th Paratroopers Brigade under 7th Infantry Division (then commanded by Maj. Gen. Yahya Khan), which later became part of the 12th Infantry Division under Maj. Gen. Akhtar Hussain Malik; Niazi commanded the 1st Infantry Brigade in Azad Kashmir for a brief period but later was reappointed as the commander of 14th Para Brigade in Zafarwal sector, he gained public notability when he participated in the famous Battle of Chawinda tank battle against the Indian Army which halted the Indian troops rotation. His role in a tank battle led him to be decorated with the Hilal-e-Jurat by the President of Pakistan. After the war, he was again took command of the School of Infantry and Tactics.

On 18 October 1966, he was promoted as Major-General and made General Officer Commanding (GOC) of the 8th Infantry Division, stationed in Sialkot, Punjab, Pakistan. On 22 June 1969, Major-General Niazi was made GOC of 10th Infantry Division, stationed in Lahore, Punjab, Pakistan. On 2 April 1971, he was promoted to Lieutenant General, and he was to take command of the Eastern Command in East Pakistan.

== East Pakistan ==
=== Eastern Command in 1971 war ===
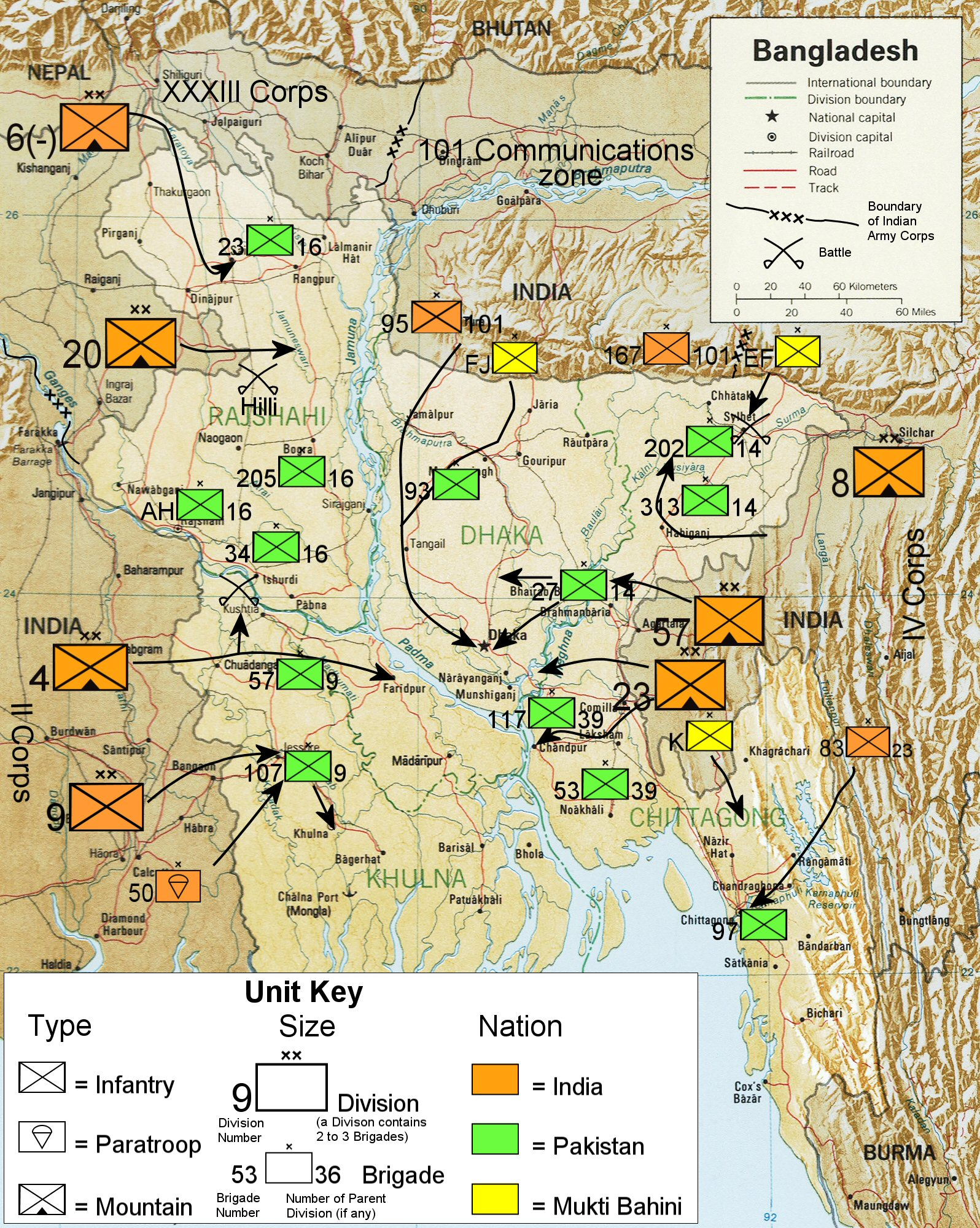
Niazi's strategy of defending the India-East Pakistan border by deploying the troops at the border.

Lieutenant-General Niazi volunteered for transfer to East Pakistan when Lieutenant-General Bahadur Sher declined the post. There were two other generals who had also refused postings in the East. However, Niazi said "yes" without necessarily realizing the risks involved and how to counter them.

After General Tikka Khan had initiated the Operation Searchlight military crackdown in March 1971, many officers had declined to be stationed in the East and Niazi arrived in Dhaka on 4 April 1971 to assume the Eastern Command from Tikka Khan. Furthermore, the mass killing of Bengali intellectuals in 1971 at the University of Dhaka had made the East Pakistani people hostile towards the Pakistani military, which made it hard for Niazi to overcome the situation. On 10/11 April 1971, he headed a meeting of his senior commanders to assess the situation but, according to eyewitnesses, he used abusive language aimed at the Bengali rebels. From May through August 1971, the Indian Army trained Mukti Bahini led Operation Jackpot, a series of counter guerrilla campaigns against the Eastern Command, and Niazi began taking countermeasures against the Bengali rebellion. By June 1971, he sent reports on the rebellion and noted that 30,000 insurgents were hurriedly trained by India at the India-East Pakistan border. In August 1971, Niazi formulated a plan to defend the borders from the advancing Indian Army based on a "fortress concept" which meant converting the border towns and villages into a stronghold.

By September 1971, he was appointed the martial law administrator in order to provide his support to Governor Abdul Motaleb Malik who appointed a civilian cabinet. On the issue of the 1971 East Pakistan genocide, Niazi had reportedly told his public relations officer and press secretary, Major Siddique Salik, that "we will have to account every single rape and killing when back in (West) Pakistan. God never spares the Tyrant."

The Government of East Pakistan appointed Niazi as commander of the Eastern Command, and Major-General Rao Farman Ali as their military adviser for the East Pakistan Rifles and Pakistan Marines. In October 1971, he created and deployed two ad hoc divisions to strengthen the defence of the East from further infiltration.

In November 1971, General Abdul Hamid Khan, the Chief of Staff of the army, warned him of an imminent Indian attack on the East and advised him to redeploy the Eastern Command on a tactical and political base ground but this was not implemented due to shortage of time. In a public message, Niazi was praised by Abdul Hamid Khan saying: "The whole nation is proud of you and you have their full support".

No further orders or clarification was issued in regards to the orders as Niazi had been caught unawares when the Indian Army planned to launch a full assault on East Pakistan. On 3 December 1971, the Pakistan Air Force (PAF) launched Operation Chengiz Khan, the pre-emptive PAF air-strikes on Indian Air Force bases that officially led to start of the Indo-Pakistani War of 1971, the third war with India. According to Krishna Chandra Sagar, Niazi was surprisingly not aware of the attack and had no prior knowledge of the attack.

Credibility of this claim is given by Niazi's press secretary and public relations officer, then-Major Siddique Salik, who wrote in Witness to Surrender, that Niazi's chief of staff Brigadier Baqir Siddiqi reportedly scolded him of not notifying Niazi and his staff of an aerial attack on India.

=== Surrendering of Eastern Command ===
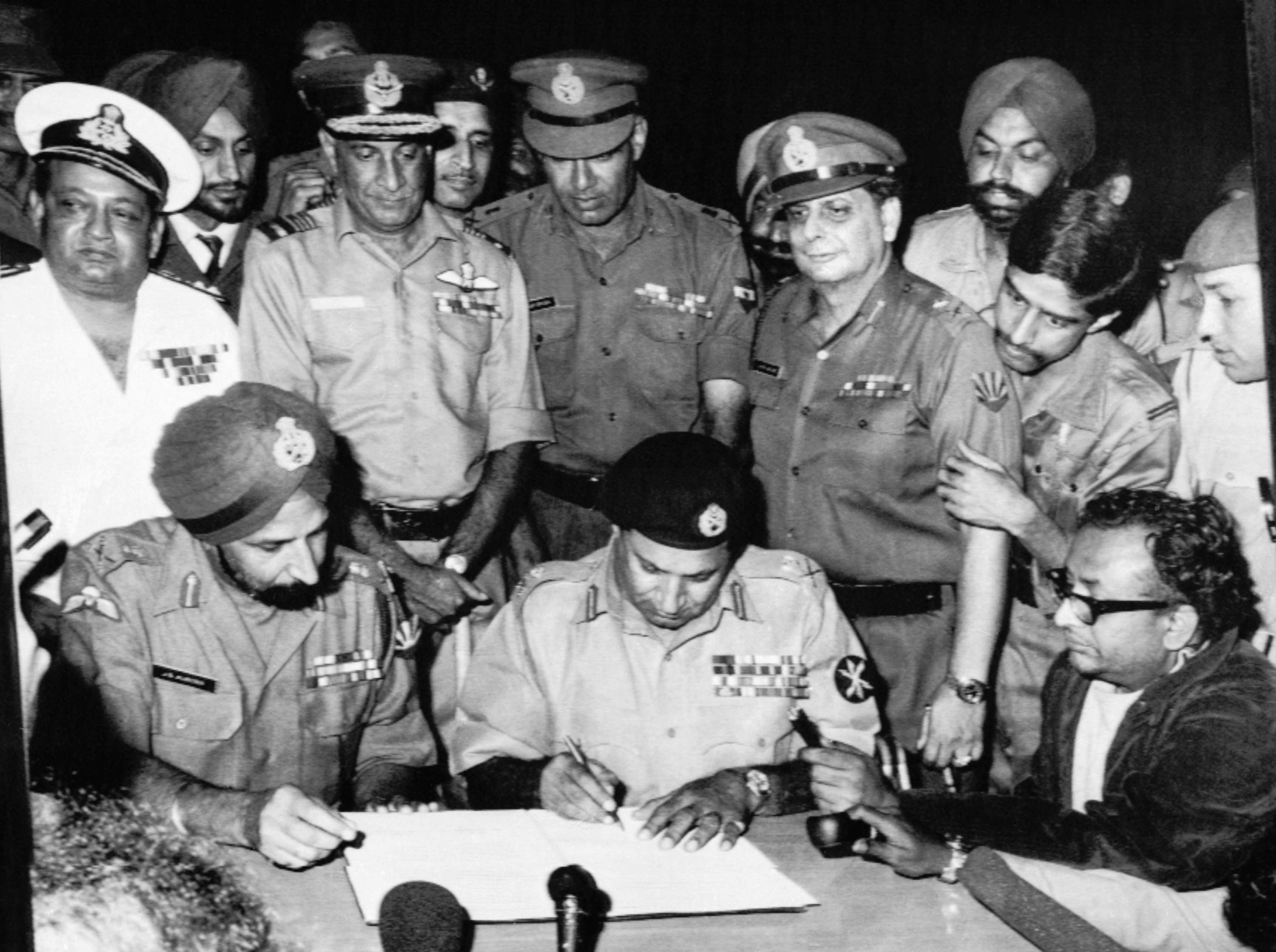
Lieutenant-General Niazi signing the Instrument of Surrender under the gaze of Indian Army's Eastern Command's commander Lt. Gen. J.S. Aurora (sitting beside Niazi), on 16 December 1971 in Dhaka.

When Indian Army soldiers crossed the borders and charged towards Dhaka, General Niazi panicked when he came to realise the real nature of the Indian strategy and became frantically nervous when the Indian Army successfully penetrated the defence of the East. Niazi's military staff further regretted not heeding the intelligence warnings issued 20 years earlier in the 1952 Cable 1971 report compiled by Major K. M. Arif, the military intelligence official on Niazi's staff.

According to testimony by Major-General Rao Farman Ali to the War Enquiry Commission, Niazi's morale collapsed as early as 7 December. Niazi broke down in tears that day when meeting Governor Abdul Motaleb Malik to deliver a progress report on the war.

General Niazi, alongside with his deputy Rear-Admiral Mohammad Shariff, nervously tried reassessing the situation to hold the Indian Army's penetration by directing joint army-navy operations with no success. The Pakistani military combat units found themselves involved in a guerrilla war with the Mukti Bahini under M. A. G. Osmani.

On 6 December, the Indian government extended diplomatic recognition to Bangladesh. By 8 December Indian troops reached the outskirts of Dhaka. Malik, Rao Farman Ali, and Niazi offered India a conditional ceasefire which called for transferring power in East Pakistan to an elected civilian government, but without the surrender of the Eastern Command led by Niazi. The offer was rejected by India, and was called illegitimate by President Yahya Khan.

Governor Abdul Motaleb resigned from his post and he took refuge with his entire cabinet at the Red Cross shelter at the Inter-Continental Dacca on 14 December.

Niazi eventually took control of the civilian government and received a telegram on 16 December 1971 from President Yahya Khan: "You have fought a heroic battle against overwhelming odds. The nation is proud of you ... You have now reached a stage where further resistance is no longer humanly possible nor will it serve any useful purpose ... You should now take all necessary measures to stop the fighting and preserve the lives of armed forces personnel, all those from West Pakistan and all loyal elements".

Subsequently, the Indian Army began encircling Dhaka and Lieutenant-General Jagjit Singh Aurora sent a message through Major-General Rafael Jacob that issued an ultimatum to surrender in a "30-minutes" time window on 16 December 1971. Niazi agreed to surrender and sent a message to Sam Manekshaw despite many army officers declined to obey, although they were legally bound. The Indian Army commanders, Lieutenant General Sagat Singh, Lieutenant General J. S. Aurora, and Major-General Jacob arrived at Dhaka via helicopter with the surrender documents.

The surrender took place at Ramna Race Course, in Dhaka at local time 16:31 on 16 December 1971. Niazi signed the Instrument of Surrender and handed over his personal weapon to J. S. Aurora in the presence of Indian and Bangladesh force commanders. With Niazi, 93,000 personnel of the Eastern Command surrendered to the joint Indian and Bangladesh Army, making it the world's largest surrender in terms of number of personnel since World War II. Niazi in his book revealed that he was very depressed at the time of surrender and that he signed the instrument of surrender with a "very heavy heart".

Niazi's personal weapon was gifted by J. S. Aurora to the Indian Military Academy for its golden jubilee celebration and preserved at National Museum in New Delhi. The revolver was reportedly stolen from the National Museum in 2003. Although it would come to light that the firearm stolen was not the real "pistol" handed over by Eastern Wing Commander A.A.K. Niazi, the real .38 Bore Revolver is currently in the safekeeping of the Indian Military Academy at Dehradun.

== War prisoner, repatriation, and politics ==
Following the surrender, the Indian Army's Military Police flew General Niazi and Admiral Mohammad Shariff from Dhaka International Airport to Calcutta via Caribou aircraft. They were transported from the military staff cars, and held at Fort William. Admiral Shariff was among the first senior ranking officers who were repatriated to Pakistan under the agreement signed in New Delhi between Prime Minister Zulfikar Ali Bhutto and Prime Minister Indira Gandhi. Niazi was symbolically repatriated to Pakistan from the Wagha point in Lahore and was handed over to Lieutenant-General Abdul Hamid Khan on 30 April 1975, in a symbolic gesture as the last war prisoner held by India.

When he was repatriated to Pakistan, Niazi came to believe himself that he would be treated as a war hero but was shocked to see when he was treated as war criminal by the concerning general public in the country.

Upon arriving in Lahore, he was barred from addressing the media and was taken under the custody of the Pakistan Army's Military Police (MP) who shifted him via helicopter to Lahore Cantonment where he was detained despite his strong protests.

He was immediately dismissed from his military commission and war honors were withdrawn from him. Subsequently, he was placed in solitary confinement for sometime, though he was later released. Being the last to return supported his reputation as a "soldier's general", but did not shield him from the scorn he faced in Pakistan, where he was blamed for the surrender. Bhutto discharged Niazi after stripping him of his military rank and his military decorations. He was dismissed from the service in July 1975.

Niazi complained that he wasn't paid the military pension due to him. He had been denied his military pension and medical benefits and lodged a complaint against the revoking of his pension. In the 1980s, the Ministry of Defence quietly changed the status of "dismissal" to "retirement" but did not restore his rank. The change of order allowed Niazi to seek a pension and the medical assistance benefits enjoyed by retired military personnel.

Niazi remained active in national politics in the 1970s. He was a leader of the Pakistan National Alliance and supported their Islamist Nizam-e-Mustafa movement against the ruling Pakistan Peoples Party. In April 1977, on the grounds that he had made objectionable speeches, he was arrested hours before Bhutto imposed martial law in the major cities of Karachi, Lahore and Hyderabad.

== War Enquiry Commission ==
In 1975, Niazi was summoned and confessed to the War Enquiry Commission led by Chief Justice Hamoodur Rahman and the Supreme Court of Pakistan on the events involving the secession of East Pakistan in April 1971. The War Commission leveled accusations against him of several kinds of moral, ethical, and professional misconduct during his tenure in East Pakistan. It confirmed that he was engaged in paan smuggling using the official aircraft from East to West Pakistan. Many senior officers, including Rao Farman Ali, held him accountable for the committed atrocities and mass rapes committed under his command and testified. According to Major General Khadim Hussain Raja, during a meeting at the command headquarters, Niazi directly threatened Bengali women with rape by his soldiers, saying "This bastard race [Bengalis] doesn't know who I am. I will change their race." This led to the suicide of a Bengali officer at the command headquarters the next morning. Lt. Col. Aziz Ahmad Khan testified to the commission, "The troops used to say that when the Commander [Lt. Gen. Niazi] was himself a raper, how could they be stopped. Gen. Niazi enjoyed the same reputation at Sialkot and Lahore."

The Commission severely indicted him for monetary corruption and moral turpitude while noting his bullying of junior officers who opposed his orders. Niazi placed the blame on the Yahya and his administration including General Tikka (whom he ultimately blamed for the army's oppressive strategy) and Maj. Gen. Farman Ali (Yahya's military adviser), Admiral S.M. Ahsan and Lieutenant-General Yakob Ali for aggravating the crisis. The Commission dismissed his claims by critically noting that General Niazi was the Supreme Commander of the Eastern Command, and that he was responsible for everything that happened in the East. Though he showed no regrets or qualms of conscience while confessing, Niazi refused to accept responsibility for the breakup of East Pakistan and squarely blamed President Yahya. The Commission endorsed his claims that Yahya was to blame, but noted that Niazi was the commander who lost the East.

The War Commission also conducted inquiries into Niazi's "side deals" to garner money during his time as GOC in Sialkot and as a martial law administrator in Lahore. The Commission said, from the mass of evidence coming before it including civil and military witnesses, that there was little doubt that Niazi came to acquire a bad reputation in sex matters, and this reputation had been consistent during his postings in Sialkot, Lahore and East Pakistan.

The commission recommended that Niazi be tried by court-martial by the Judge Advocate General on the most serious breaches of military disciplines and military code of honor, for total military incompetence, and on 15 additional charges. Niazi did not admit culpability for losing East Pakistan, and dared the army to court-martial him. Defence analyst Ahmad Faruqui wrote that any trial likely would have fixed blame on other senior army officers as well as Niazi. No such court-martial took place.

In 1998, he authored a book, The Betrayal of East Pakistan, which describes his view of the events that led to 16 December 1971.

== Death and legacy ==
Shortly after giving an interview to Views On News hosted by Shahid Masood on ARY News, Niazi died on 1 February 2004 in Lahore, Punjab, Pakistan. He was buried in Military Graveyard in Lahore.

Political commentators described Niazi's legacy as a mixture of the foolhardy, and the ruthless. He was noted for making audacious statements like, "Dacca will fall only over my dead body". According to Akbar S. Ahmed, he had even hatched a far-fetched plan to "cross into India and march up the Ganges and capture Delhi and thus link up with Pakistan." This he called the "Niazi corridor theory" explaining "It was a corridor that the Quaid-e-Azam demanded and I will obtain it by force of arms". In a plan he presented to the central government in June 1971, he stated in his own words that "I would capture Agartala and a big chunk of Assam, and develop multiple thrusts into Indian Bengal. We would cripple the economy of Calcutta by blowing up bridges and sinking boats and ships in Hooghly River and create panic amongst the civilians. One air raid on Calcutta would set a sea of humanity in motion to get out of Calcutta”. A.R. Siddiqui wrote in Dawn newspaper: "When I last met him on 30 September 1971, at his force headquarters in Kurmitola, he was full of beans".

== Awards and decorations ==
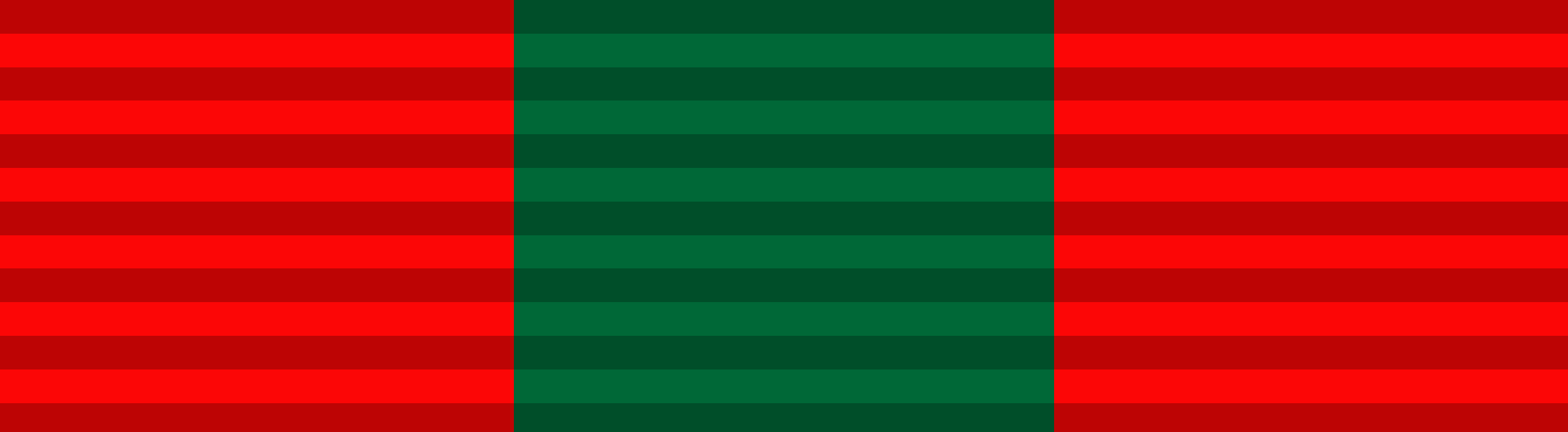

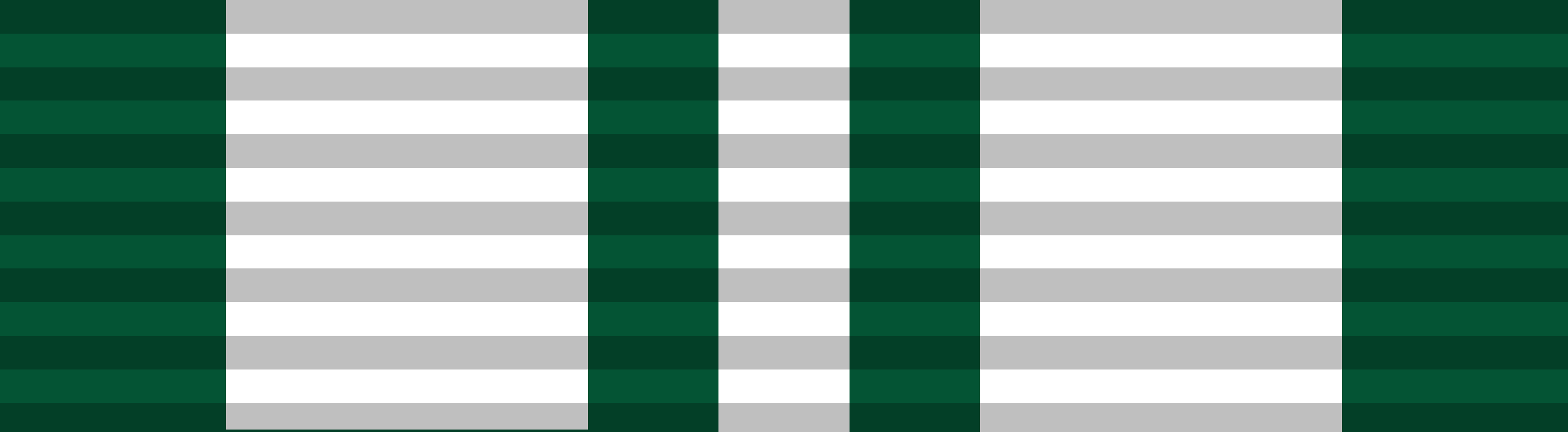

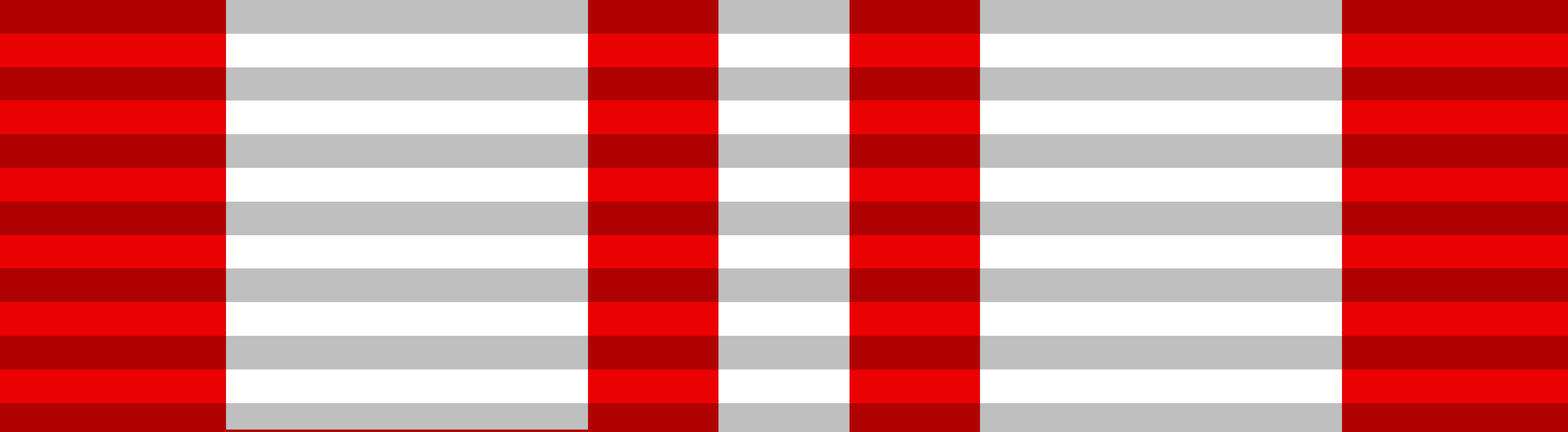

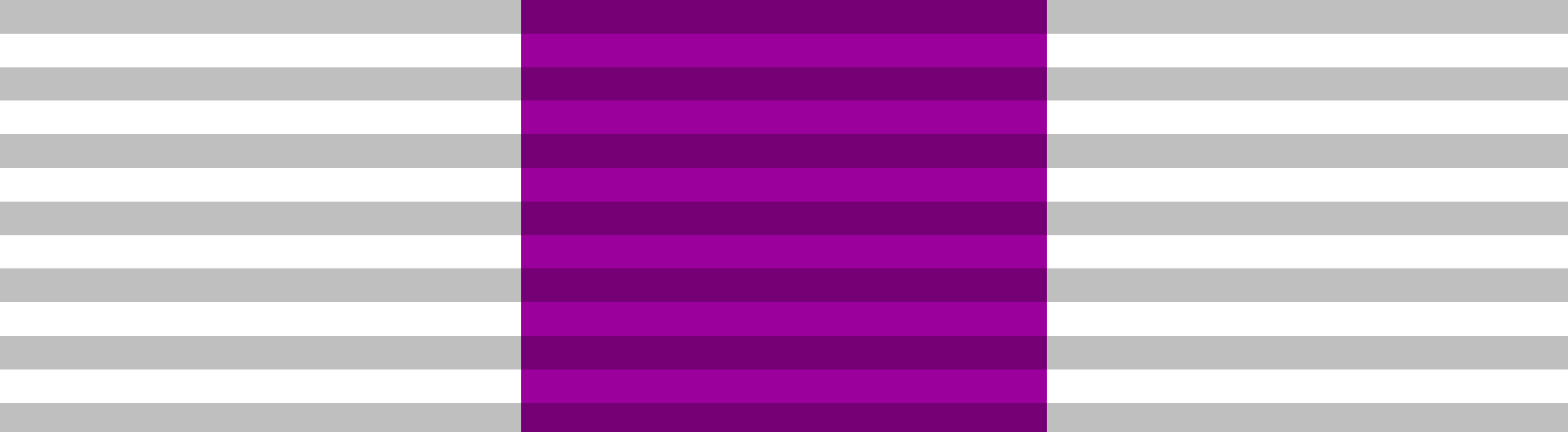

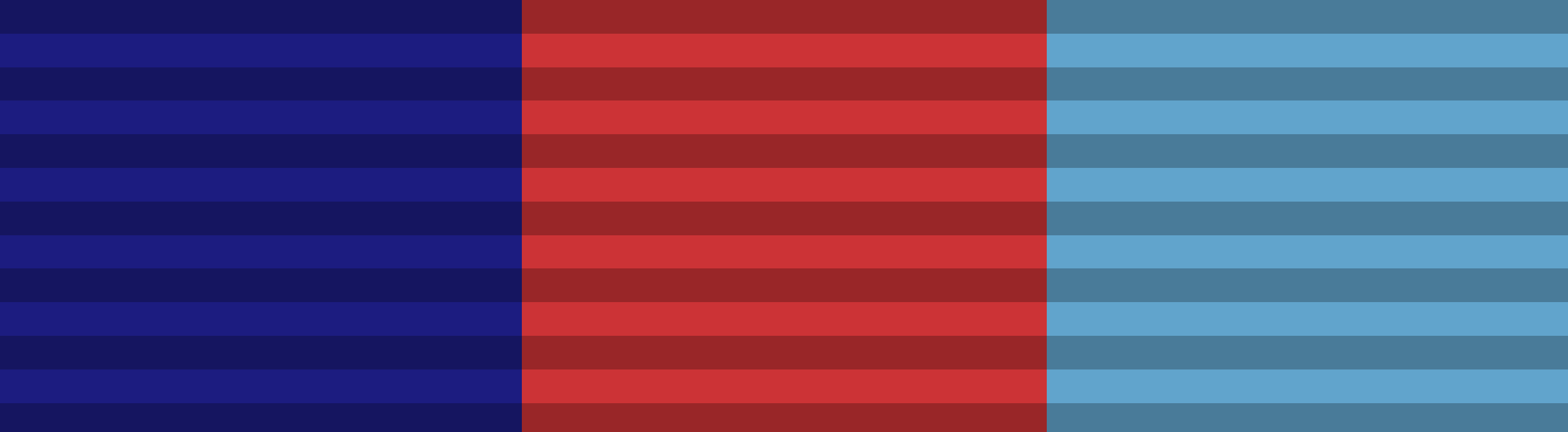

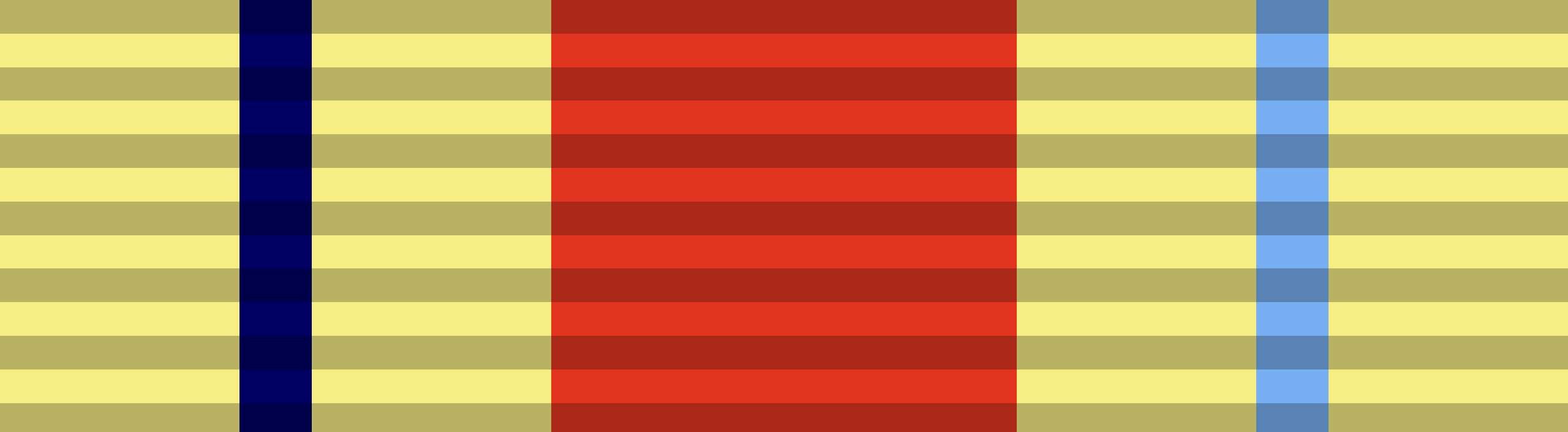

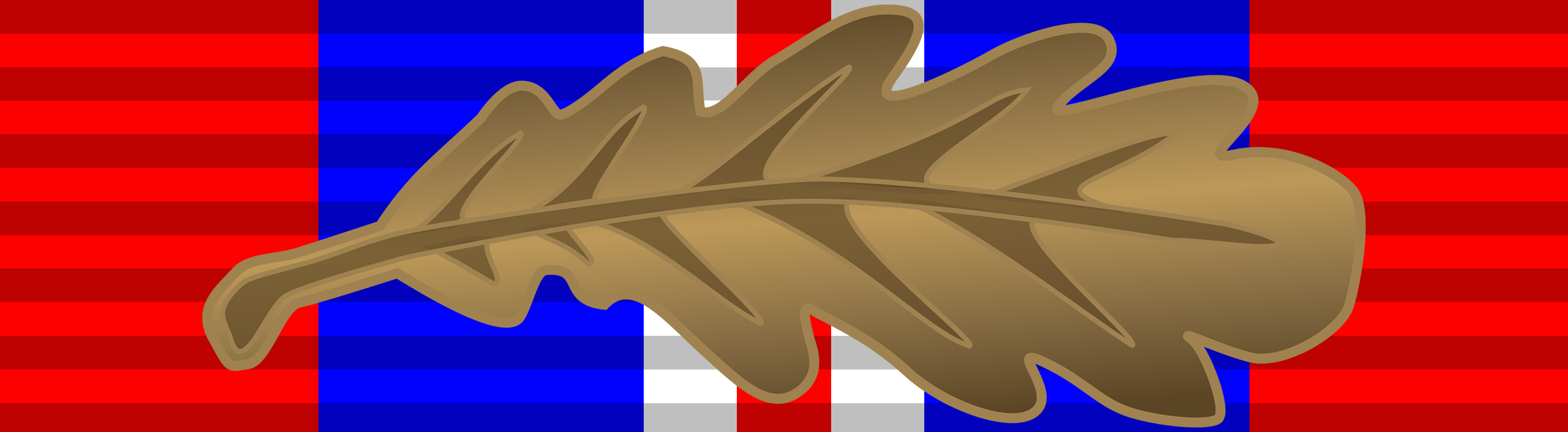

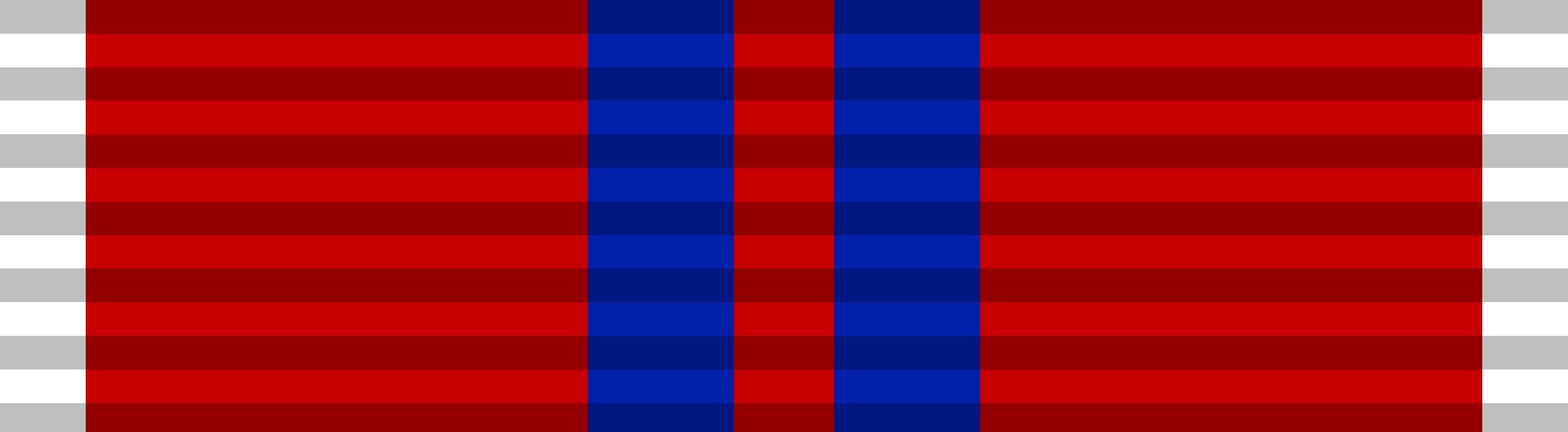

Hilal-e-Jurat & Bar (Crescent of Courage): 1. 1965 War; 2. 1971 War		Sitara-e-Pakistan (Star of Pakistan) (SPk)	
Sitara-e-Khidmat (Star of Service) (SK)	Tamgha-e-Diffa (General Service Medal): 1. 1965 War Clasp; 2. 1971 War Clasp	Sitara-e-Harb 1965 War (War Star 1965)	Sitara-e-Harb 1971 War (War Star 1971)
Tamgha-e-Jang 1965 War (War Medal 1965)	Tamgha-e-Jang 1971 War (War Medal 1971)	Pakistan Tamgha (Pakistan Medal)	Tamgha-e-Jamhuria (Republic Commemoration Medal) 1956
Military Cross (MC) (awarded for GALLANTRY in Kohima 1944)	1939-1945 Star	Africa Star	Burma Star
War Medal 1939-1945 (with MiD oak leaf) awarded in Java 1945	India Service Medal 1939–1945	General Service Medal (awarded in Java 1946)	Queen Elizabeth II Coronation Medal (1953)

=== Foreign decorations ===
Foreign Awards
UK	Military Cross (MC)
UK	1939-1945 Star
UK	Africa Star
UK	Burma Star
UK	War Medal 1939-1945 (with MiD oak leaf)
UK	India Service Medal 1939–1945
UK	General Service Medal
UK	Queen Elizabeth II Coronation Medal

== Notes ==
Military offices
Preceded by Lieutenant General Tikka Khan	Commander of Eastern Command; 7 April 1971 – 16 December 1971	Succeeded by Office abolished
Political offices
Preceded by Abdul Motaleb Malik	Governor of East Pakistan; 14 December 1971 – 16 December 1971	Succeeded by Office abolished
