= Delhi Agreement =

1973 agreement between India, Pakistan, and Bangladesh

Transfer of Population Under the Terms of the Delhi Agreement
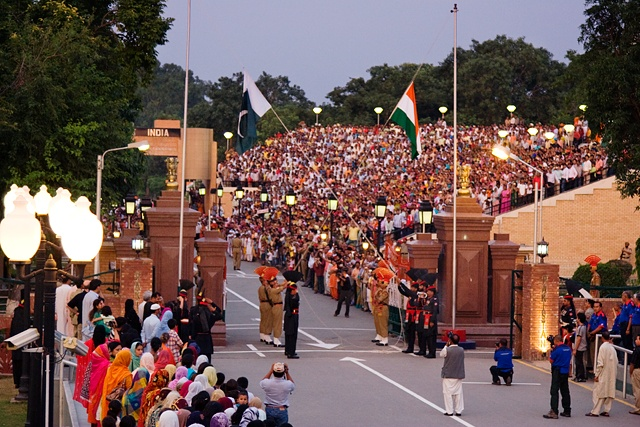
- Flags of India and Pakistan being lowered at the Wagah Border in Punjab
- Type: Population transfer
- Context: Cold War
- Drafted: 17 April 1973
- Signed: 9 April 1974; 52 years ago
- Location: New Delhi, India
- Sealed: 19 September 1973
- Effective: 28 August 1973
- Condition: Ratification by both parties
- Expiration: 28 August 1974
- Expiry: 1 July 1974
- Mediators: Home ministries of India, Pakistan and Bangladesh
- Negotiators: Foreign ministries of India, Pakistan and Bangladesh
- Signatories: Swaran Singh (_{Minister of External Affairs}); Aziz Ahmed (_{Foreign Minister of Pakistan}); Kamal Hossain (_{Foreign Minister of Bangladesh})
- Parties: India; Pakistan; Bangladesh
- Ratifiers: Parliaments of India and Pakistan
- Depositary: Indira Gandhi _{Prime Minister of India} Zulfikar Ali Bhutto _{Prime Minister of Pakistan}
- Depositaries: Government of India; Government of Pakistan
- Languages: English

The Delhi Agreement was a trilateral agreement signed between India, Pakistan and Bangladesh on 28 August 1973; and ratified only by India and Pakistan. It allowed the repatriation of prisoners of war and interned officials held in the three countries after the 1971 Bangladesh Liberation War. The agreement has been criticised for Pakistan's failure to repatriate Urdu-speakers in Bangladesh, not holding to account 195 senior military officials accused of breach of conduct during war and not making provision for a war crimes tribunal.

The treaty was signed by the foreign ministers of India, Pakistan and Bangladesh in New Delhi after the Simla Agreement.

== Background ==
During the 1971 Bangladesh War, thousands of Bengali bureaucrats and military personnel were interned in West Pakistan along with their families by the Pakistani Government. In Bangladesh, many in the Urdu-speaking community wished to relocate to Pakistan. India held several thousand Pakistani prisoners of war after the Surrender of Pakistan on 16 December 1971, including 195 military officers held for breach of conduct.

President Zulfikar Ali Bhutto (at the time Chief Martial Law Administrator) threatened to put interned Bengali officials on trial if Bangladesh proceeded with plans to indict alleged Pakistani war criminals.

== Implementation ==
The treaty came into effect on 28 August 1973 and ended on 1 July 1974. Under the terms of the agreement, UNHCR supervised the repatriation of Bangladeshi and Pakistani citizens. According to the UN, 121,695 Bengalis were moved from Pakistan to Bangladesh. They included high-level Bengali civil servants and military officers. 108,744 non-Bengali civilians and civil servants were moved from Bangladesh to Pakistan. India released 6,500 Pakistani PoWs, who were mostly transported by train to Pakistan. In 1974, General Niazi was the last Pakistan officer symbolically repatriated through the Wagah - Attari Border.

Although the agreement called for the repatriation of Urdu-speaking Biharis in Bangladesh, the Pakistani Government backtracked on its promise to resettle the community in Pakistan. This gave rise to the stateless Stranded Pakistani community in Bangladesh.

== War crimes suspects ==
Among the PoWs, 195 Pakistani military officers held in India were identified as prime war crimes suspects. Pakistan pressed for their release as one of its key demands. It pressured several Muslim countries to withhold recognition of Bangladesh until the release of the 195 officers. India favoured their repatriation to Pakistan. In the text of the agreement, the Foreign Minister of Bangladesh, Kamal Hossain, stated that:

the excesses and manifold crimes committed by those prisoners of war constituted, according to the relevant provisions of the UN General Assembly resolutions and international law, war crimes, crimes against humanity and genocide, and that there was universal consensus that persons charged with such crimes as 195 Pakistani prisoners of war should be held to account and subjected to the due process of law.

Pakistan evaded Bangladesh's request to hold the trial of war crimes suspects. On April 9, 1974, Bangladesh-India-Pakistan signed the agreement in New Delhi.

== Legacy ==
The repatriation was an important milestone in the establishment of diplomatic relations in 1974. In Bangladesh, many repatriated officials rose to prominence. A notable example was Justice Abdus Sattar, the 9th President of Bangladesh. Many repatriated military personnel served in the leadership of the Bangladesh Armed Forces, including Rear Admiral Mahbub Ali Khan, Lt General Muhammad Mahbubur Rahman and Lt Gen Attiq ur Rehman (a Lt Col, commanding an Anti Aircraft Artillery Regiment in 1971).

Pakistan's inability to repatriate stateless Urdu-speakers in Bangladesh as well as its refusal to try those accused of war crimes remains a major sore point in Bangladesh-Pakistan relations.

== Readings ==
- Text of the tri-patriate agreement of Bangladesh-Pakistan-India
