= Westridge, Rawalpindi =

Residential area in Rawalpindi, Pakistan

Westridge is a residential area in Rawalpindi, Pakistan, which dates back to 1880 when the British Army first came into this area and established its cantonment in Rawalpindi, amongst a few other Military Units it set up here.

Initially, a few units of Signals Battalion were established here in 1916. Later on, a few other military units were moved in an effort to strengthen the hold of British Army in Rawalpindi. These units consisted of Frontier Force, Air Defense, and Artillery. Later on, Special Communication Organization was also transferred here.

In 1960, Cantonment Board allowed establishment of 3 housing schemes, namely Westridge 1, Westridge 2, and Westridge 3 in this area. As a result, Army Housing Directorate (Renamed to DHA in 1979) announced residential schemes for Army and Civilian personnel. As the population increased in due course of time and thousands of houses were constructed in the area to allow a high end life style community that offer cultural as well as educational facilities. At present it is among the most expensive residential areas in Rawalpindi, which is partly due to its proximity to Islamabad.

== Educational ==
1. Army Public School
2. Fauji Foundation School
3. Grammar Foundation School
4. Beaconhouse School System
5. The City School
6. Pakistan Quality
7. Zia Ur Rehman Teaching Hospital
8. Bahria School For Girls and Boys
9. Dar-e-Arqam
10. The Educators
11. Roots International School
12. FG Public School

== Local markets ==
1. Headlines Beauty Clinic & Studios
2. Westridge Bazar
3. Pasban Welfare Complex
4. CSD (Canteen Stores Department) - Westridge 1
5. Allah Abad Market - Westridge 3
6. CSD Mega Mall - Westridge 2
7. Center Point - Allahabad
