= Pakistani Instrument of Surrender =

Written agreement of the 1971 Bangladesh Liberation War

Instrument of Surrender of Pakistan
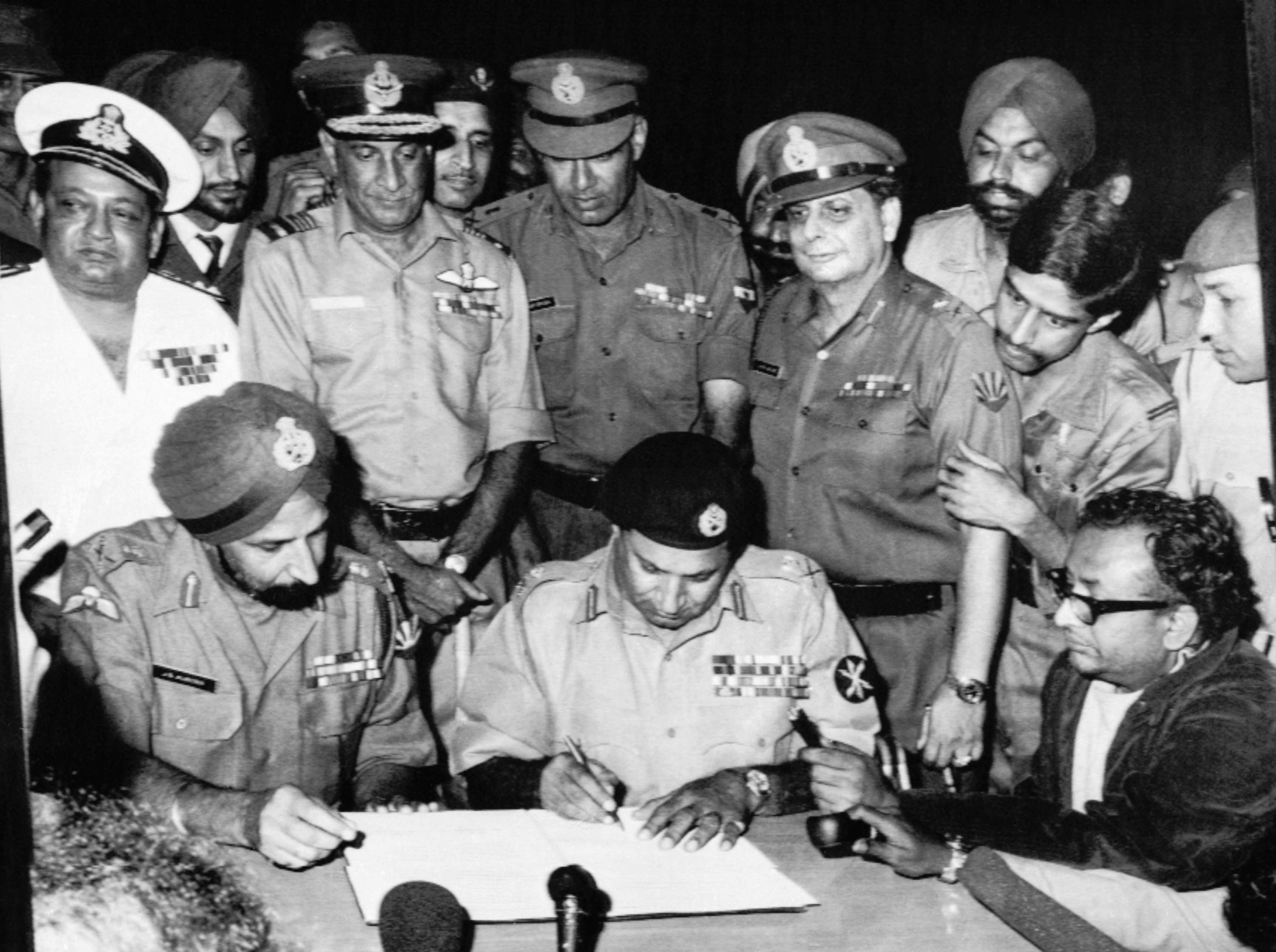
- Lt. Gen. A. A. K. Niazi of the Pakistan Army signing the Instrument of Surrender under the direction of Lt. Gen. Jagjit Singh Aurora of the Indian Army and Bangladesh Forces
- Ratified: 16 December 1971
- Location: Dacca, East Pakistan (now Bangladesh)
- Signatories: A. A. K. Niazi; Jagjit Singh Aurora
- Subject: Surrender of the Pakistan Armed Forces Eastern Command
- Purpose: Ending the Bangladesh Liberation War and the Indo-Pakistani War of 1971

The Pakistani Instrument of Surrender (Bengali: পাকিস্তানের আত্মসমর্পণের দলিল, romanized: Pākistānēr Ātmôsômôrpôṇēr Dôlil) was a legal document signed between India (alongside the Provisional Government of Bangladesh) and Pakistan to end the Bangladesh Liberation War and the Indo-Pakistani War of 1971. Per the trilateral agreement, the Pakistani government surrendered the Armed Forces Eastern Command, thereby enabling the establishment of the People's Republic of Bangladesh over the territory of East Pakistan. The document was signed by India's Lt. Gen Jagjit Singh Aurora and Pakistan's Lt. Gen. A. A. K. Niazi, and led to the surrender of 93,000 Pakistanis, of which about 34,000–45,000 were soldiers — one of the world's largest surrenders in terms of number of personnel since World War II. (Note: While various sources and news media report the Pakistani surrender as being the largest since WW2, other surrenders, such as the South Vietnamese surrender in the aftermath of the Hue–Da Nang offensive, have been reported as having far more captured personnel.) Despite the agreement, Pakistan did not formally recognize Bangladeshi sovereignty until February 1974.

The ratification of the agreement by all sides also marked the end of the Bangladesh genocide, perpetrated by Pakistan during the conflict. Bangladesh and the Indian Armed Forces celebrate Pakistan's 1971 defeat and surrender on an annual basis, observing 16 December as Victory Day.

== Surrender ceremony ==
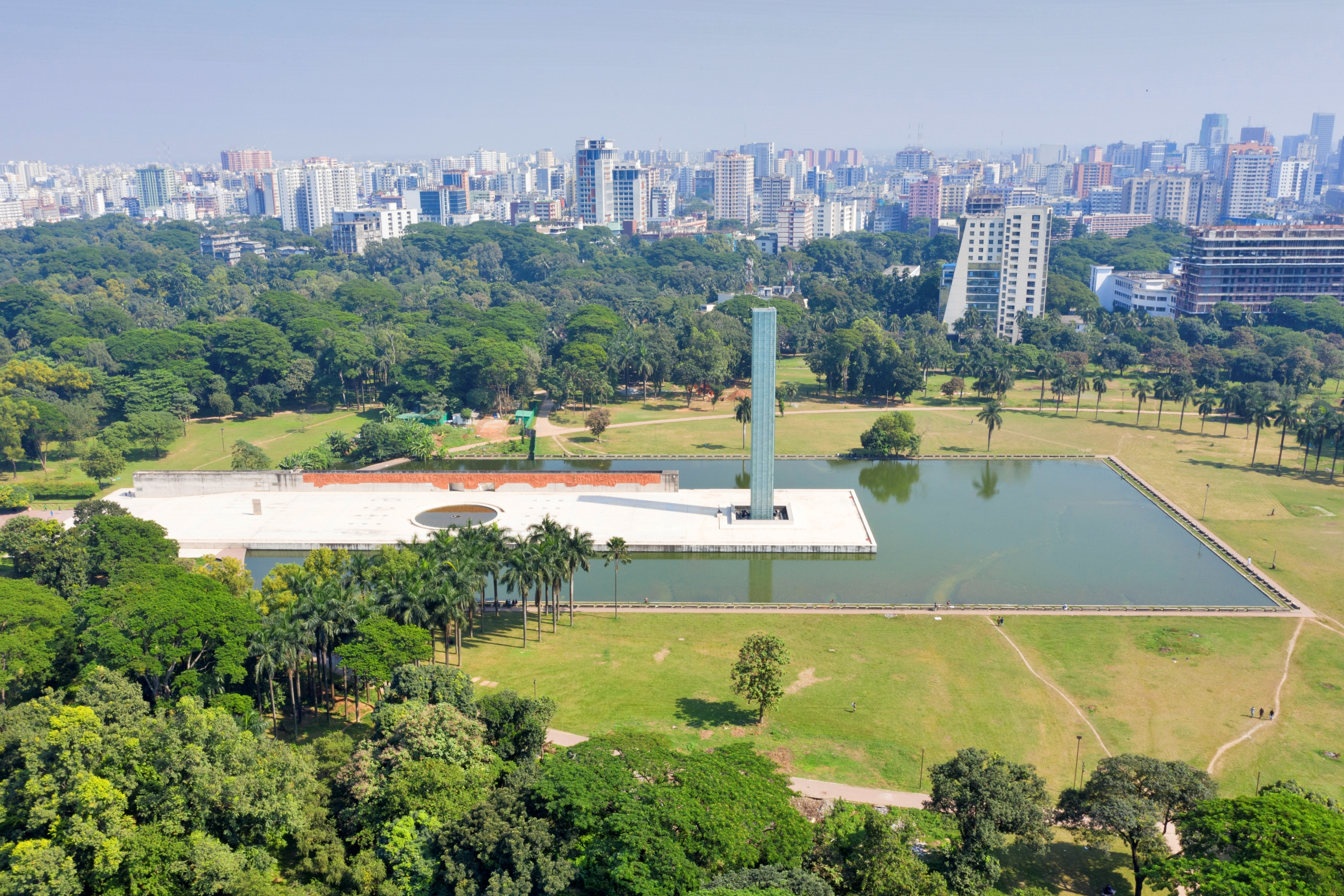
The Swadhinata Stambha (lit. 'Independence Monument') in Suhrawardy Udyan (formerly known as the Ramna Race Course), which stands at the place where the Pakistani Instrument of Surrender was signed in 1971.

The surrender ceremony took place at the Ramna Race Course in Dacca, East Pakistan (now Bangladesh), on 16 December 1971: A. A. K. Niazi of the Pakistan Army formally surrendered to Jagjit Singh Aurora, an Indian Army officer and joint commander of the Bangladesh Forces. A. K. Khandker, Deputy Chief of Staff of the Bangladesh Forces, represented the Provisional Government of Bangladesh at the ceremony.

Also present from the Pakistani Eastern Command were Mohammad Shariff of the Pakistan Navy and Patrick Desmond Callaghan of the Pakistan Air Force, both of whom signed the agreement alongside Niazi. Sagat Singh, Commander of the Indian IV Corps; Hari Chand Dewan, Commander of the Indian Eastern Air Command; and J. F. R. Jacob, Chief of Staff of the Indian Eastern Command; all acted as witnesses on behalf of India.

Niazi accepted the surrender while the crowd on the race course promptly erupted in celebrations.

== Text of the instrument ==
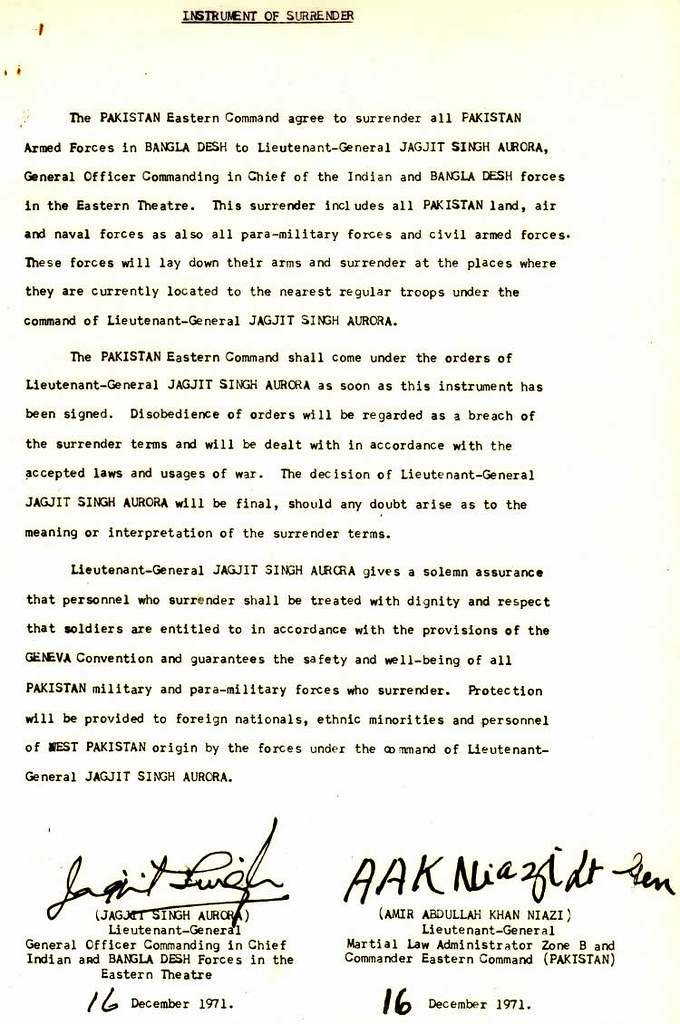
Scanned copy of the 1971 Pakistani Instrument of Surrender, Bangladesh Ministry of Liberation War Affairs

The document is now public property under the governments of India, Bangladesh, and Pakistan, and can be seen on display at the National Museum in the Indian capital of New Delhi. The text of the Instrument of Surrender is as follows:

INSTRUMENT OF SURRENDER

The PAKISTAN Eastern Command agree to surrender all PAKISTAN Armed Forces in BANGLA DESH to Lieutenant-General JAGJIT SINGH AURORA, General Officer Commanding in Chief of the Indian and BANGLA DESH forces in the Eastern Theatre. This surrender includes all PAKISTAN land, air and naval forces as also all para-military forces and civil armed forces. These forces will lay down their arms and surrender at the places where they are currently located to the nearest regular troops under the command of Lieutenant-General JAGJIT SINGH AURORA.

The PAKISTAN Eastern Command shall come under the orders of Lieutenant-General JAGJIT SINGH AURORA as soon as this instrument has been signed. Disobedience of orders will be regarded as a breach of the surrender terms and will be dealt with in accordance with the accepted laws and usages of war. The decision of Lieutenant-General JAGJIT SINGH AURORA will be final, should any doubt arise as to the meaning or interpretation of the surrender terms.

Lieutenant-General JAGJIT SINGH AURORA gives a solemn assurance that personnel who surrender shall be treated with dignity and respect that soldiers are entitled to in accordance with the provisions of the GENEVA Convention and guarantees the safety and well-being of all PAKISTAN military and para-military forces who surrender. Protection will be provided to foreign nationals, ethnic minorities and personnel of WEST PAKISTAN origin by the forces under the command of Lieutenant-General JAGJIT SINGH AURORA.

<signed>
<signed>

(JAGJIT SINGH AURORA)
Lieutenant-General
General Officer Commanding in Chief
Indian and BANGLA DESH Forces in the
Eastern Theatre
16 December 1971

(AMIR ABDULLAH KHAN NIAZI)
Lieutenant-General
Martial Law Administrator Zone B and
Commander Eastern Command (PAKISTAN)
16 December 1971

== Sources ==
- "Instrument of Surrender of Pakistani forces in Dacca", Hosted by Ministry of External Affairs, India
- "The Separation of East Pakistan"
