= Dhaka defence scheme (adhoc) =

Pakistani Military Plan during the Bangladesh Liberation War

Dhaka Defense Scheme (adhoc)
- ڈھاکہ ڈیفنس سکیم ঢাকা প্রতিরক্ষা প্রকল্প
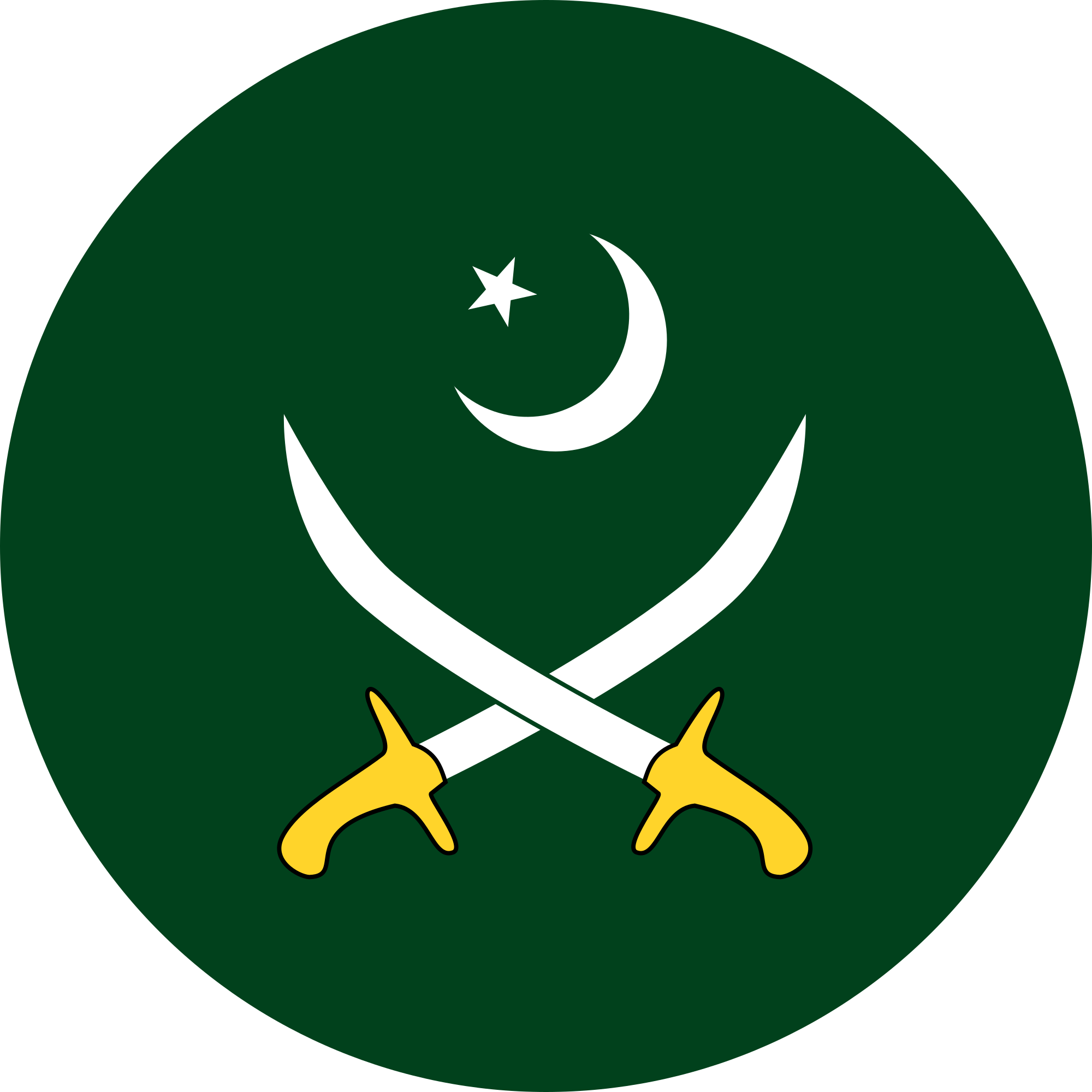
- Insignia of GHQ Pakistan
- Active: 21 November 1971–16 December 1971
- Country: Pakistan
- Eastern Command Headquarters: Dacca Cantonment, East Pakistan, Pakistan
- Motto: Defend Dacca at all costs

Commanders
- Corps Commander: Lt. Gen. A. A. K. Niazi
- Chief of Staff: Brig. Baqir Siddiqui
- Notable commanders: Maj. Gen. Hussain Raja; Brig. William Harrison; Brig. T.J. Malik

The Dhaka Defence Scheme (adhoc) was a strategic military framework formulated by the Eastern Command of the Pakistan Army in 1971 to fortify the capital of East Pakistan (now Bangladesh) against the combined offensives of the Indian military and the Mukti Bahini insurgency. Conceived amidst the Bangladesh Liberation War and later the Indo-Pakistani War of 1971, the scheme aimed to establish a structured defence for Dhaka, the administrative and military nerve centre of the eastern theater. However, its execution was undermined by severe logistical constraints, the absence of adequate reinforcements, and the sheer numerical and tactical superiority of opposing forces, ultimately rendering it ineffective.

== Background ==
Following the March 1971 military crackdown under Operation Searchlight by Tikka Khan, Pakistan faced increasing resistance from the Mukti Bahini, the Bengali nationalist militia fighting for independence. The Indian military also provided support to the Mukti Bahini, further escalating the conflict.

In anticipation of a full-scale war with India, the Eastern Command, under Lieutenant General A. A. K. Niazi, the commander of the Eastern Command formulated the Dhaka Defence Scheme as an emergency defensive plan. The objective was to consolidate Pakistani forces in and around Dhaka, creating a last-stand defense against Indian forces should they attempt to capture the capital.

== Affiliation ==
The Dhaka Defence Scheme was a critical component of the broader Eastern Command strategy, designed to maintain control over East Pakistan amidst growing insurgency and external military intervention. The Eastern Command was tasked with overseeing all military operations in East Pakistan, and the Dhaka Defence Scheme was meant to be its final contingency plan for defending the administrative and military center of the region. However, the rapid Indian advance and internal weaknesses led to the failure of the scheme, culminating in the surrender of 93,000 Pakistani troops on 16 December 1971.

By 16 December 1971, the scheme had completely collapsed, and Lieutenant General A. A. K. Niazi surrendered to the Indian Armed Forces and Mukti Bahini, marking the end of the Bangladesh Liberation War and the creation of independent Bangladesh.

== Assigned commanders ==
Rank	Name	Area of Responsibility
Brigadier	Mohammad Kashim	Dhaka Cantonment and Tongi area
Brigadier	Mian Mansoor Ali	Munshiganj and Narayanganj
Brigadier	Tajammul Hussain Malik	Hilli and Bogra
Brigadier	Bashir Ahmed	Dhaka city proper
Brigadier	William Harrison	Comilla and Chittagong

== EPCAF HQ and sector units ==
Unit Name	Type
Police	Law Enforcement
Razakars	Paramilitary
Al-Badr	Militia
Al-Shams	Militia
Peace Committee	Paramilitary
East Pakistan Rifles	Border Guard
