= Bangladesh Liberation War order of battle: Pakistan =

Order of Battle

On 25 March 1971, the Pakistani military, supported by paramilitary units, launched the military operation to pacify the muktibahini held areas of East Pakistan, which led to a prolonged conflict with the Bengali Mukti Bahini. Although conventional in nature during March–May 1971, it soon turned into a guerrilla insurgency from June of that year. Indian Army had not directly supported the Bengali resistance but had launched Operation Jackpot to support the insurgency from May 1971.

The initial deployments of the Pakistan armed forces were to combat and contain the activities of the Mukti Bahini. This was changed over time and by December 1971, 3 Infantry and 2 ad hoc divisions were deployed to face the Mitro Bahini.

== Background: Initial deployments against Mukti Bahini ==
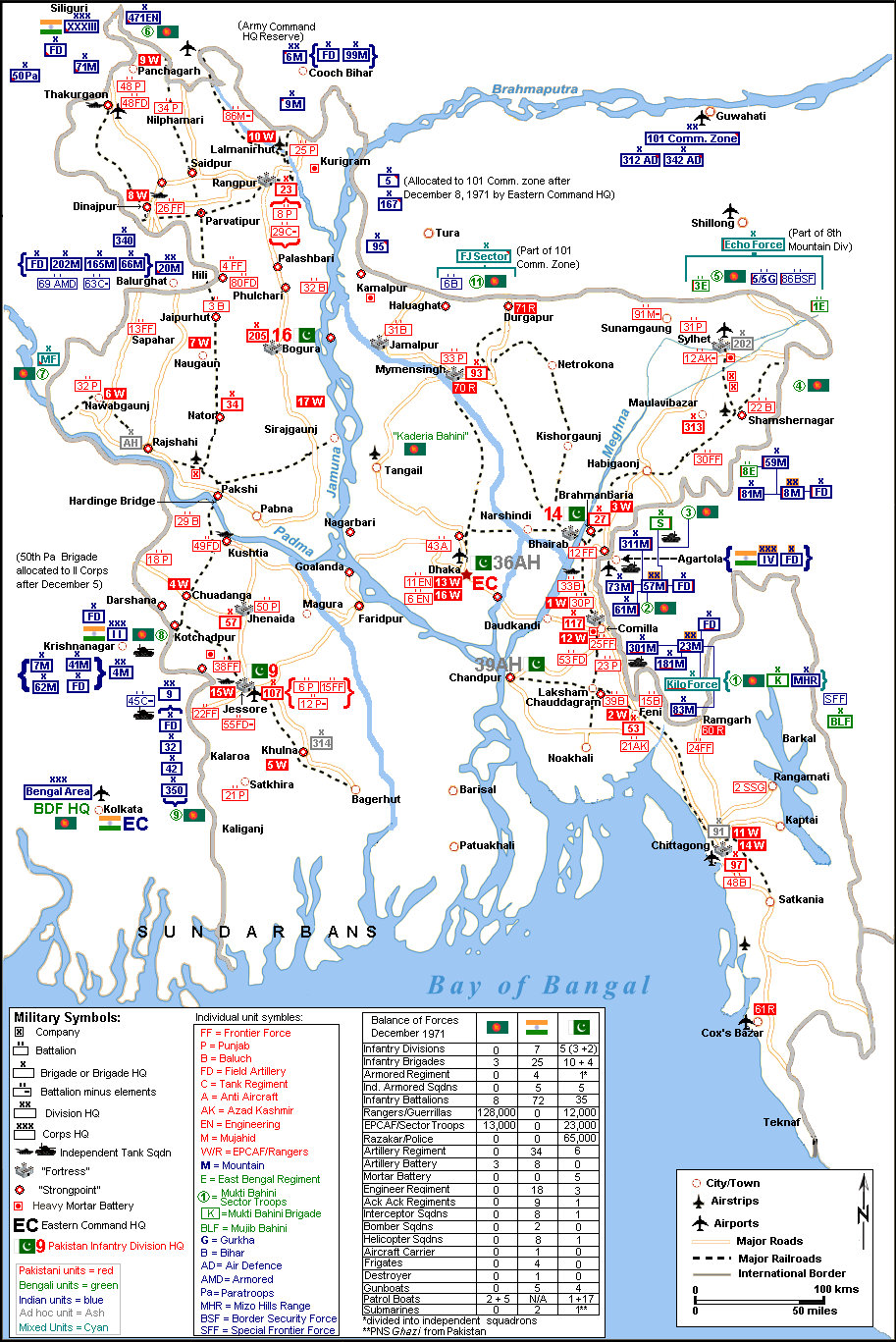
Order of Battle: Location of Pakistani and Mitro bahini units on 3 December 1971. Some unit locations are not shown. Map not to exact scale

From the March 1971, the Pakistani military's Eastern Command under its commander Lieutenant-general A.A.K. Niazi, started military deployment to provide the defence of borders linked with India against a possible penetration by the Indian Army. During this time, the 9th Infantry Division, headquartered in Jessore under its GOC Major-general Shaukat Riaz, had held the area of responsibility for looking after the looking area south of the Padma River for the defence of borders linked with India while the 16th Infantry Division, that headquartered in Bogra under its GOC Major-general Nazar Hussain Shah, had been responsible for the area north of Padma and west of Jamuna rivers.

The 14th Infantry Division under its GOC Major-general Rahim Khan, was headquartered in Dhaka that had the entire area of responsibility for the rest of the province.

The original plan was based on a series of exercises, known as Titumeer, which were held during 1970–1971, was revised several times and approved in October 1971. General Niazi had created 4 ad hoc infantry brigades and 2 ad hoc infantry divisions before the final order of battle was devised. The final order of battle prior to 3 December 1971, was:

Eastern Command Headquarters, Dhaka
Commander, Eastern Command: Lt. Gen. A.A.K. Niazi
GOC, 14th Infantry Division (till March '71): Maj. Gen. Khadim Hussain Raja
Military Advisor: Maj. Gen. Rao Farman Ali
COS: Brig. Baqir Siddiqui
CO Artillery: Brig. S.S.A. Kashim
CO Armoured: Col. Bakhtier
CO Engineers: Brig. Iqbal Sharif
CO Signals: Brig. Areef Reza
CO Medical: Brig. Fahim Ahmed Khan
CO SSG Army: Lt. Col. Tariq Mehmood
Dir. ISPR: Major Siddique Salik
Dir. Military Intelligence: Major K.M. Arif

- Units under HQ Control:
  **6th Engineer Regiment
  **10th Engineer Regiment – detached to various locations
  **11th Engineer Regiment – Lt. Col Sarwar
  ** 43rd Light Ack Ack – Lt. Col. Mohammad Afzal
  ** 19th Signal Regiment
  **3rd Commando Battalion (less elements)
  **Army Aviation Squadron #4 – Lt. Col. Liakat Bokhari

=== Dhaka Defence Scheme (Adhoc) ===
Brig. Kashim (North): Dhaka Cantonment & Tongi area
Brig. Mian Mansoor (East): Munshiganj & Narayanganj
Brig. T.H. Malik: Hilli & Bogra
Brig. Bashir: Dhaka city proper
Brig. William Harrison: Comilla & Chittagong

- EPCAF HQ and Sector units:
  - Police and Razakars

== 36 Ad hoc Infantry Division ==
GOC: Major General Muhammad Jamshed HQ Dhaka
Area of Operation: Dhaka, Tangail and Mymensingh districts

- 93 Infantry Brigade: Brig Abdul Qadir Khan HQ Mymensingh
  - adhoc tank squadron
  - 31 Baluch – Jamalpur
  - 33 Punjab – Mymensingh
  - 71 Wing WPR – Kishorganj
  - 70 Wing WPR – Bijaipur

== 14 Infantry Division ==
GOC: Major General Abdul Majid Qazi, HQ Brahmanbaria
Area of Operation: Sylhet and Northern Comilla districts

- 34th Punjab Regiment

=== Sylhet ===
- 202 Infantry Brigade: Brig. Salimullah
  - 31 Punjab – Sylhet
  - 91 Mujahid Force Battalion – Sunamganj

Also: Wings of Tochi, Thal and Khyber scouts

=== Moulvibazar ===
- 313 infantry Brigade: Brig. Iftikar Rana
  - 22 Baloch – Kulaura (Battle of Gazipur)
  - 30 Frontier Force – Shamshernagar (in Kamalganj)
  - 91 Mujahid Force (two companies) & Tochi Scouts – Sherpur

=== Brahmanbaria ===
- 27th Infantry Brigade: Brig. Saadullah
  - 33rd Baluch – Kasba
  - 12th Frontier Force – Akhaura
  - 12th Azad Kashmir
  - 3 PT-76 and 1 M24 Chaffee

== 39 Ad hoc Division ==
GOC: Maj. Gen. Rahim Khan (replaced by Brig. Mian Mansoor) – Chandpur
Area of Operation: Comilla, Feni and Northern Chittagong

  - 21st Azad Kashmir (one companies with each brigades)

=== Comilla ===
- 117th Infantry Brigade: Brig. Sheikh M.H. Atif
  - 30 Punjab – Saldanadi
  - 23 Punjab
  - 25th Frontier Force – Mainamati
  - 12th Azad Kashmir – Comilla (two companies)

=== Feni ===
- 53rde Infantry Brigade: Brig. Aslam Niazi
  - 15th Baluch – Belonia
  - 39th Baluch – Laksham

=== Ramgarh ===
- 91st Ad hoc Brigade: Brig. Mian Taskeenuddin HQ Chittagong
  - 24th Frontier Force – Ramgarh (two companies)
  - Chakma and Mizo troops
  - EPCAF 11th and 14th Wing
  - One Pakistan Ranger battalion
  - One Mujahid Battalion

=== Chittagong ===
- 97th Independent Brigade: Brig. Ata Mohd. Khan Malik
  - 48th Baluch – Chittagong
  - 24th Frontier Force
  - 2 SSG Commando – Rangamati
  - 60th Wing Rangers – Ramgarh
  - 61st Wing Rangers – Cox's Bazar
  - Marine Battalion

== 16th Infantry Division ==
GOC: Maj. Gen. Nazar Hussain Shah HQ: Bogra, then Natore
Area of Operation: Rajshahi, Bogra, Dinajpur, Rangpur and Pabna
Districts

  - 34th Punjab
  - 29th Cavalry (three squadrons of M24 Chaffee)
  - 13 Engineer Battalion

=== Saidpur ===
- 23rd Infantry Brigade: Brig. Iqbal Shaffi
  - 25th Punjab – Lalmanirhut
  - 26th Frontier Force – Dinajpur
  - 48th Punjab – Thakurgaon
  - 8 Punjab – Rangpur
  - 86th Mujahid – Gaibandha

=== Bogra ===
- 205th Infantry Brigade: Brig. Tajammul Hussain Malik HQ: Khetlal
  - 13th Frontier Force
  - 4th Frontier Force – Hili
  - 3rd Baluch – Jaipurhut

=== Natore ===
- 34th Infantry Brigade: Brig. Mir Abdul Nayeem
  - 32nd Punjab – Nawabganj
  - 32nd Baloch
  - 12nd Punjab (one company)

=== Rajshahi ===
- Rajshahi Ad hoc Brigade

== 9th Infantry Division ==
GOC: Maj. Gen HM. H. Ansari HQ Jessore
Area of Operation: Khulna, Jessore, Kushtia, Faridpur, Barisal and Patuakhali districts

  - 6th Punjab
  - 21st Punjab (R&S)
  - 3rd Independent Armoured Squadron (M24 Chaffee)

=== Jhenidha ===
- 57th Infantry Brigade: Brig. Manzoor Ahmed
  - 18th Punjab – Darshana
  - 50th Punjab – Jhenida
  - 29th Baluch – Kushtia

=== Jessore ===
- 107th Infantry Brigade: Brig. Malik Hayat Khan
  - 22nd Frontier Force – Benapole
  - 38th Frontier Force – Afra
  - 15th Frontier Force – Jessore
  - 12th Punjab – Jessore (minus one company)

=== Khulna ===
- 314th Ad Hoc Brigade: Brig. Fazle Hamid
  - One Mujahid Bn
  - Five East Pakistan Civil Armed Force companies
  - Five Internal security force companies

== Pakistan Air Force ==
Air Officer Commanding, Dacca airbase: Air Cdre Inamul Haque Khan
Officer Commanding (Operations Wing): GP.Capt. Zulfiqar Ali Khan
Officer-in Charge (OIC), No. 14 Squadron "Tail-choppers’’: Wg. Cdr. Mohammed Afzal Chowdhury

- Number of aircraft of the squadron: 20 F-86 Sabers
- Training unit: 3 T-33

== Pakistan Navy ==
Flag officer commanding, Eastern Naval Command: R.Adm Mohammad Shariff
CO Pakistan Marines/CO SSG Navy: Capt. Ahmad Zamir
Dir. MILCOM: Cdr. T.K. Khan
Dir. Nav Intel.: Cdr. Mansurul Haq

- 4 Gunboats: PNS Rajshahi, Comilla, Sylhet and Jessore
  - 1 Patrol Boat: PNS Balaghat
  - 17 armed boats
  - 24 improvised gunboats

== Paramilitary ==
East Pakistan Civil Armed Forces : Maj Gen Mohammad Jamshed Khan

- Rangpur Sector : 8th Wing, 9th Wing, 10th Wing
- Comilla Sector : 1st Wing, 3rd Wing, 12th Wing
- Chittagong Sector : 2nd Wing, 11th Wing, 14th Wing
- Dacca Sector : 13th Wing, 16th Wing
- Jessore Sector : 4th Wing, 5th Wing, 15th Wing
- Rajshahi Sector : 6th Wing, 7th Wing, unidentified wing

== See also ==
- Mitro Bahini order of battle
- Evolution of Pakistan Eastern Command plan
- Military plans of the Bangladesh Liberation War
- Timeline of the Bangladesh Liberation War
- Indo-Pakistani wars and conflicts

== Notes and references ==
=== References ===
- Jacob, J. F. R. (1997). Surrender at Dacca: Birth of A Nation. The University Press Limited. ISBN 81-7304-189-X.
- Niazi, A.A.K (1998). The Betrayal of East Pakistan. Oxford University Press. ISBN 0-19-577727-1.
- Qureshi, Hakeem Arshad (2002). The Indo Pak War of 1971: A Soldiers Narrative. Oxford University Press. ISBN 0-19-579778-7.
- Salik, Siddiq (1997) [First published 1977]. Witness to Surrender. Oxford University Press. ISBN 0-19-577761-1.
