= 3 Medium Regiment (India) =

Indian Army artillery unit

- Active: 1956 – present
- Country: India
- Allegiance: India
- Branch: Indian Army
- Type: Artillery
- Size: Regiment
- Nickname: Tridents
- Mottos: SARVATRA, IZZAT-O-IQBAL "Everywhere with Honour and Glory".
- Colors: "Red & Navy Blue"

Commanders
- Notable commanders: Lieutenant General JFR Jacob; Major General LS Lehl; Major General PC Kharbanda

Insignia
- Abbreviation: 3 Med Regt

3 Medium Regiment is part of the Regiment of Artillery of the Indian Army. (Note: 3 Field Regiment of the Royal Indian Artillery (RIA) was allotted to Pakistan during partition and exists today as 2 Field Regiment, Pakistan Army.)

== Formation ==
3 Medium Regiment was raised on 14 May 1956 as a field artillery regiment at Delhi Cantonment. The regiment was formed out of 50, 52, 53 and 54 artillery post groups, which were reorganised to form the present batteries. The Post Group organisation ceased to exist thereafter.

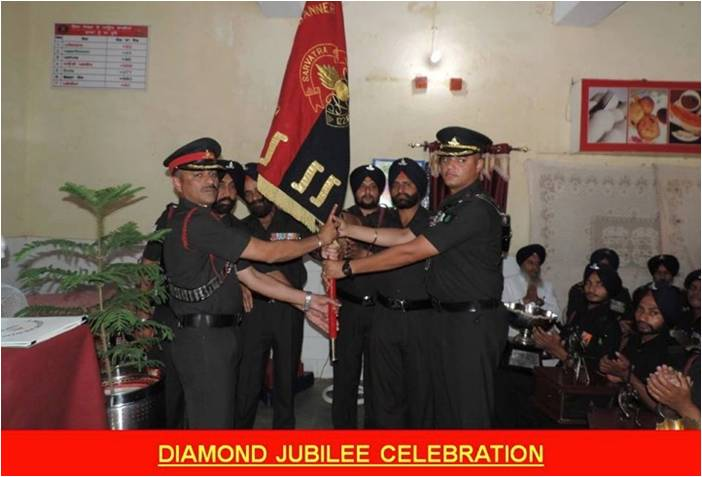
3 Medium Regiment on their Diamond Jubilee of raising.

Lieutenant Colonel (later Lieutenant General) J. F. R. Jacob was the first commanding officer. The class composition was initially planned to be 'all-India', but then it was decided to be a 'Single Class' regiment composed entirely of Sikh gunners.

== Operations ==
Operation Vijay

The regiment under the command of Lieutenant Colonel (later Major General) LS Lehl, VrC took part in the liberation of Goa, but didn't see much action as the Portuguese offered hardly any resistance.

Sino-Indian War

In 1962, the unit was deployed in Sikkim, but this sector did not see any action.

Indo-Pakistani War of 1971

The regiment took part in Operation Cactus Lily in the Uri sector. The gunners manned eighteen 25-pounders and eight 3.7-inch howitzers and used them for direct firing and bunker bursting roles. It supported attacks in the Uri sector on Jaishree, Ring Contour, Jandi Mali, Shah Panja, Dhum Chitek and Lower Udham posts.

Operation Rakshak II

The regiment took part in anti-terrorist operations in Hoshiarpur district of Punjab in 1992. The then commanding officer Colonel (later Major General) PC Kharbanda was awarded the Sena Medal for the operation during which two terrorists were killed.

Operation Rakshak

Between 1998 and 2001, the unit was part of Counter Insurgency Operations in Jammu and Kashmir. The unit killed 11 militants and captured one along with considerable arms and ammunition. The unit got nine gallantry awards during this tenure in the form of COAS and GOC-in-C Commendation Cards.

Operation Meghdoot

The regiment was deployed under 3 Infantry Division in Siachen between 2003 and 2005. In addition to its guns in the glacier, a battery each were posted at the base camp and at Turtuk. The unit was awarded the appreciation of the GOC-in-C (Northern Command) and the GOC, XIV Corps.

Operation Kosi Prahar

In 2008, the Kosi River broke its embankment causing floods in several districts of Nepal and Bihar. The unit along with two more columns from other artillery units were inducted for flood relief in Supaul, Bihar on 1 September 2008.

Operation Snow Leopard

Soldiers from 16 Bihar, 3 Punjab, 3 Medium Regiment and 81 Field Regiment were involved in a deadly clash with People's Liberation Army soldiers at Galwan valley in Ladakh on the night of 15 June 2020. 20 Indian soldiers were killed, which included two from the regiment. The regiment captured a Chinese Colonel during the clash, who was later released by the Indian forces.

Havildar Tejinder Singh was awarded the Vir Chakra. The Sena Medal was awarded to Lieutenant Colonel Suraj Bhan Singh and Naib Subedar Harinder Singh and posthumously to Naib Subedars Satnam Singh and Mandeep Singh.

== Honours and awards ==
Shaurya Chakra – Second Lieutenant JP Joshi

== Notable Commanders ==
- Lieutenant General Jack Farj Rafael Jacob PVSM - Chief of staff of the Eastern Command during the Bangladesh Liberation War; GOC-in-C, Eastern Command; Governor of the Indian states of Goa and Punjab.
- Major General Lachhman Singh Lehl PVSM, VrC – Third commanding officer, war hero and military historian
- Major General Praveen Chandra Kharbanda AVSM, SM – Deputy Commander in Chief, Strategic Forces Command

== War Cry ==
The war cry of the regiment is Jo Bole So Nihal - Sat Shri Akal.

== See also ==
- List of artillery regiments of Indian Army
