= Lachhman Singh Lehl =

Indian Army general and military historian (1923–2020)

Major-General Lachhman Singh Lehl PVSM, VrC
- Born: 9 July 1923; Lehl village, Hoshiarpur district, Punjab Province, British Raj (present-day Punjab, India)
- Died: 18 June 2020 (aged 96); New Delhi, India
- Military career
- Allegiance: British India; India
- Branch: British Indian Army; Indian Army
- Service years: 1943–1978
- Rank: Major General
- Service number: IC-1461
- Unit: Regiment of Artillery
- Commands: 20 Mountain Division; 301 Mountain Brigade; 3 Field Regiment
- Conflicts: World War II; Burma Campaign; Battle of Meiktila and Mandalay; Indonesian National Revolution; Indo-Pakistani War of 1947–1948; Annexation of Goa; Indo-Pakistani War of 1965; Naxalite–Maoist insurgency; Indo-Pakistani War of 1971; Battle of Hilli
- Awards: Param Vishisht Seva Medal; Vir Chakra

Major General Lachhman Singh Lehl PVSM, VrC (9 July 1923 – 18 June 2020) was a highly decorated Indian Army general and military historian noted for his command of the 20th Mountain Division in the Battle of Hilli during the Indo-Pakistani War of 1971.

== Early life ==
A native of Hoshiarpur district, Lehl was the youngest son of a prosperous Jat Sikh agricultural family, one of six siblings (four boys, two girls). His grandfather was the Lehl village headman, while his father was a lawyer who practised in the Hoshiarpur district court. He passed out from Khalsa High School with a high first division before joining the Government Intermediate College.

== Second World War ==
On 12 October 1942, Lehl was selected for a temporary British Indian Army commission from the Indian Military Academy. After training at the School of Artillery, Deolali, he received an emergency commission as a second lieutenant in the Royal Indian Artillery on 11 July 1943. His first posting was with the 2nd Indian Field Battery of 1 Indian Field Regiment, a motorised artillery regiment then at Peshawar. He fought in the Burma Campaign, including at the Battle of Meiktila and Mandalay as a gun position officer (GPO), and after the war saw action as an officer in the British occupation force during the Indonesian National Revolution. After the war, Lehl's battery was incorporated into an all-Muslim unit, which was stationed at Rawalpindi in early 1947. He took his annual leave with effect from 12 August 1947, three days before Indian independence and the country's partition.

== Kashmir 1947–1948 and Vir Chakra ==
Following Partition, Lehl was reassigned to 11 Field Artillery. During the Indo-Pakistani War of 1947-1948, by then serving with 11 Field Artillery under the 50th Para Brigade, Lehl fought as an acting captain in the battles of Chhamb, Naushera, Jhangar, Rajauri, Uri and Zoji La, and was wounded at Zoji La. As the forward observation officer at Jhangar, he accurately directed his battery's artillery fire. On 15 March 1948, his actions resulted in the successful extrication of a company of the 3rd Maratha Light Infantry which had been pinned down by enemy fire. Disregarding his own safety, he engaged the enemy troops for eight hours, and continued to effectively support the 3rd Marathas in pursuing their objectives on 16 March. For his gallantry, Lehl was decorated with the Vir Chakra (VrC). He later attended the Defence Services Staff College at Wellington.

== Commands ==
In 1960, Lehl became the CO of 3 Field Regiment. The regiment participated in the Goa operations the following year, as well as in the 1962 Sino-Indian War in the Sikkim sector, but saw no action. He was assigned as a GSO 1 with 6 Mountain Division in the NEFA in 1963, and was posted to the Military Operations Directorate at army headquarters during the Indo-Pakistani War of 1965. On 16 November 1966, he was given command of 301 Mountain Brigade. After completing the National Defence College (NDC) course in 1969, Brigadier Lehl was appointed deputy director of Military Training (DDMT-A) on 9 January 1970. He took command of the 20th Mountain Division on 13 October 1970, with a promotion to acting major-general. The division was then at Binaguri in West Bengal, and Lehl was advised that due to poor relations between the Eastern Army Commander Jagjit Singh Aurora and the XXXIII Corps Commander Mohan L. Thapan, he would be undertaking a difficult assignment. In January 1971, his division took part in actions against the Naxals in West Bengal and was subsequently involved in monitoring the state elections.

== 1971 war and Battle of Hilli ==
At the outset of the 1971 war, the Indian Army planned a four-pronged attack, with a thrust from the north-west into East Pakistan spearheaded by XXXIII Corps under Lt-Gen Thapan, to be directly undertaken by 20 Mountain Division under Lehl along with 71 Mountain Brigade. The operation would cut off the Hili-Gaibanda line to capture Bogra and Rangpur. Though Lehl felt a frontal attack on the well-fortified town of Hili would incur heavy casualties, he was overruled by Lt-Gen Aurora. Despite heavy casualties, Lehl's forces were nonetheless victorious. He took the surrender of Major-General Pir Nazar Hussain Shah, commander of Pakistan's 16 Division on 18 December 1971. He was awarded the Param Vishisht Seva Medal (PVSM) for his services.

== Subsequent career and later life ==
On 21 October 1972, Lehl was promoted substantive major-general, and was appointed Chief of Staff (COS) I Corps on 19 September 1973. On 21 March 1974, only six months later, he was transferred to Delhi HQ as Deputy Quartermaster-General (DQMG), a clear signal he had been passed over for promotion to lieutenant-general. Though he accepted his expected supersession in 1976 with grace, it shocked many of those who knew him and his career. He superannuated from the Army on 31 July 1978 after 35 years of service.

In retirement at Delhi, Lehl became a military historian, writing a number of highly acclaimed books and articles on Indian Army campaigns. He also served as vice-president of the "War Decorated India Trust." Lehl died on 18 June 2020, aged 96. He was married, with one son.

== Bibliography ==
- Indian Sword Strikes in Bangladesh
- Victory in Bangladesh
- Missed Opportunities in the 1965 Indo-Pak War

== Decorations ==

	Param Vishisht Seva Medal	Vir Chakra	
Wound Medal	General Service Medal 1947	Samanya Seva Medal	Samar Seva Medal
Poorvi Star	Raksha Medal	Sangram Medal	Sainya Seva Medal
Indian Independence Medal	25th Anniversary of Independence Medal	30 Years Long Service Medal	20 Years Long Service Medal
9 Years Long Service Medal	1939-1945 Star	Burma Star	War Medal 1939–1945

== Dates of rank ==
Insignia	Rank	Component	Date of rank
	Second Lieutenant	British Indian Army	11 July 1943 (emergency); 9 January 1946 (substantive)
	Lieutenant	British Indian Army	11 January 1944 (war-substantive); 30 January 1947 (substantive)
	Lieutenant	Indian Army	15 August 1947 (Note: Upon independence in 1947, India became a Dominion within the British Commonwealth of Nations. As a result, the rank insignia of the British Army, incorporating the Tudor Crown and four-pointed Bath Star ("pip"), was retained, as George VI remained Commander-in-Chief of the Indian Armed Forces. After 26 January 1950, when India became a republic, the President of India became Commander-in-Chief, and the Ashoka Lion replaced the crown, with a five-pointed star being substituted for the "pip.")
	Lieutenant	Indian Army	26 January 1950 (recommissioning and change in insignia)
	Captain	Indian Army	11 April 1950
	Major	Indian Army	11 April 1957
	Lieutenant-Colonel	Indian Army	21 December 1963
	Colonel	Indian Army	22 May 1968
	Brigadier	Indian Army	16 November 1966 (acting); 23 May 1968 (substantive)
	Major general	Indian Army	13 October 1970 (acting); 21 October 1972 (substantive)
