= Baqir Siddiqui =

Pakistani army officer

- باقر صدیقی
- Born: c. 1920s British India
- Education: Indian Military Academy
- Military career
- Allegiance: Pakistan
- Branch: Pakistan Army
- Service years: 1947—1975
- Rank: Brigadier
- Unit: Infantry
- Commands: Chief of staff, Eastern Command
- Conflicts: Indo-Pakistani War of 1965; Bangladesh Liberation War; Indo-Pakistani War of 1971

Ghulam Muhammad Baqir Siddiqui (Note: Urdu: غلام محمد باقر صدیقی) was a one-star rank officer in the Pakistan Army who served as the Chief of Staff of the Army Eastern Command during the Bangladesh Liberation War under A. A. K. Niazi. In this role, he had played a significant role in the military administration of the region.

== Military career ==
Ghulam Muhammad Baqir Siddiqui was commissioned into the Pakistan Army in 1947 after completing his military training at the Indian Military Academy in Dehradun.

In January 1959, Major Baqir Siddiqui served as part of the Pakistani military delegation at the Karachi Conference Series for the Baghdad Pact Organization.

=== Eastern Command ===
In mid 1971, during the Bangladesh Liberation War, then Lieutenant Colonel Baqir Siddiqui was promoted to the substantive rank of Brigadier and assigned to East Pakistan. Here he took over the position of Chief of staff in the Eastern Command of the Pakistan Army from Ghulam Jilani Khan. In this capacity, he was responsible for advising the Corps commander on defense plans and military operations. He reportedly worked closely with A. A. K. Niazi. He played a vital role in creation of the ad hoc formations during the war. He used to follow the direct orders of Niazi, as well as establishing a communication between the General Headquarters and Eastern Command.

In November 1971, Brigadier Siddiqui traveled to GHQ in Rawalpindi to request for additional troops for the Eastern Command.

The Hamoodur Rahman Commission Report suggested that Siddiqui should go through Court martial, as he reportedly neglected his duty to advise the Commander of the Eastern Command. Though he played a vital role in the war, he has been often criticized for his alleged failed role. Brigadier Siddiqui worked closely with Indian general J. F. R. Jacob to work out the details and organization of the Pakistani Instrument of Surrender.

== Surrender and aftermath ==
After the Eastern Command's surrender, Siddiqui was taken as a prisoner of war in India. On December 21, 1971, he and 12,000 of his troops surrendered to Indian Army's Major General Gandharv Nagra.

Upon surrendering, Siddiqui gave interviews to the press. In one interview, he stated that loss was a part of war, and Pakistani forces had to accept the loss. He also added that he had surrendered because he knew that if he had continued to fight, there would be more human losses.

During his time as a POW in Jabalpur, India, Brigadier Siddiqui made efforts to subvert the inquiry proceedings of the commission. He was repatriated to Pakistan in 1974 following the Simla Agreement. The Hamoodur Rahman commission noted that Siddiqui got along well with his Indian counterparts, so much so that during his time as a POW in Kolkata, he was allowed to go out shopping.

He was removed from service in 1975 under section 16 of the Army act. Siddiqui was one of two officers, who were retired without pension. General Niazi claimed that Siddiqui was punished for his loyalty to Niazi.
