= Battle of Hilli =

Battle of the Bangladeshi Liberation War

Coordinates: 24°51′N 89°22′E

- Part of Bangladesh Liberation War and Indo-Pakistani War of 1971
- Major Niazi of 31 Punjab regiment surrendering to Lt Col V.R. Swaminathan of 22 Maratha Light infantry after the battle of Hilli/Bogra on 16 December 1971
Date	First Battle: 22–24 November 1971; Second Battle: 10–11 December 1971
Location	Hilli, Rajshahi, Bangladesh
Result	Bangladeshi-Indian victory
Territorial changes	Morapara was liberated in November; Hilli was liberated along with Bogra in December

Belligerents
Bangladesh: Mukti Bahini; India (22 November –18 December 1971): Indian Army	Pakistan: Pakistan Army

Commanders and leaders
Maj. Gen. Lachhman Singh Lehl; Brigadier Farhad Batti; Lt. Col. Shamsher Singh; Major Kazi Nuruzzaman; Maj. Hemant Manjrekar †; Maj. K. K. Rao †	Brig. Gen. Tajammul Hussain Malik (POW); Brig. Gen. Mumtaz Malik

Units involved
First Battle, 23–24 November; Sector VII; 20th Mountain Division; 202nd Mountain Brigade: 5th Battalion, Garwhal Rifles; 8th Battalion, the Guards; 22nd Battalion, Maratha Light Infantry; 37th Mountain Regiment (artillery); 38th Medium Regiment (artillery, understrength); 100th Mountain Regiment (artillery); 1 Squadron of T-55s detached from 63 Cavalry; Second Battle, 10–11 December; 20th Mountain Division; 202nd Mountain Brigade: 8th Battalion, the Guards; 22nd Battalion, Maratha Light Infantry	First and Second Battles; 205th Infantry Brigade: 3rd Battalion, Baluch Regiment; 4th Battalion, Frontier Force; 32nd Battalion, Baluch Regiment; 1 M24 Chaffee Squadron; 1 artillery regiment

Strength
Total; ~18,000 including support and non-combat elements First Battle; ~2,700–3,600; Second Battle ~1,800–2,400	Total; ~8,000 including support and non-combat elements First and Second Battle ~2,700–3,600

Casualties and losses
First Battle; 196 killed/wounded Second Battle; 20 killed/wounded	First Battle; ~80 killed/wounded Second Battle; 20 killed 3 POW; 2 M24 Chaffees destroyed 3 105mm howitzers destroyed

The Battle of Hilli were two major battles fought from 22 to 24 November and again from 10 to 11 December 1971. They are generally regarded as the bloodiest battles of the eastern front of the Indo-Pakistani War of 1971. The first battle saw, according to veterans of the battle, the fiercest fighting of the war, but the second was much tamer.

The Indian objective was to capture a network of Pakistani fortifications centred around the village of Hilli to allow for an advance on the town of Bogra.

== Indian objective ==
The main objective of the Indian Army in the sector was to capture a network of Pakistani forts centred around Hilli, which would allow the XXXIII Corps to advance toward the important town of Bogra, south-east of Hilli. The 202nd Mountain Brigade, part of 20th Mountain Division, was selected for the task, with its constituent battalions attacking different forts in the network. The 8th Battalion of the Brigade of the Guards was to secure the main objective of Hilli.

== Orders of battle ==
=== Bangladesh ===
Sector VII was assign over Rajshahi, Pabna, Bogra and part of Dinajpur District. The headquarters of the sector was at Tarangpur near Kaliaganj under Major Kazi Nuruzzaman at the time of the battle. The sector was composed of regular militia and components from 1st East Bengal Regiment.

=== India ===
The 20th Mountain Division had under it four infantry brigades; the 202nd, the 165th, the 66th and the 340th. As the 165th, 66th and 340th were assigned different objectives to Hilli, the only brigade participating in the upcoming battle would be the 202nd.

==== 202nd Mountain Brigade ====
- 5th Battalion, Garwhal Rifles
- 8th Battalion, Guards
- 22nd Battalion, Maratha Light Infantry
- 37th Mountain Regiment (artillery)
- 38th Medium Regiment (artillery, understrength)
- 100th Mountain Regiment (artillery)
- 1 Squadron of T-55s detached from 63 Cavalry

=== Pakistan ===
The defence of Bogra against an entire division was the sole responsibility of the Pakistani 205th Infantry Brigade, under Brigadier Tajammul Husain Malik. The remainder of the 16th Infantry Division, of which the 205th was a part, was defending other parts of the north-western area of East Pakistan.

==== 205th Infantry Brigade ====
- 3rd Battalion, Baluch Regiment
- 4th Battalion, Frontier Force
- 32nd Battalion, Baluch Regiment
- 1 M24 Chaffee Squadron
- 1 artillery regiment

== First Battle of Hilli ==
Although India and Pakistan were legally and technically at peace in November 1971, Lieutenant General Jagjit Singh Aurora ordered the attack on Hilli to lay the groundwork for the all-out offensive into East Pakistan, which he knew was coming. D-Day for the operation was pushed back or changed multiple times but was finally set for 22 November. 8 Guards was chosen as the battalion to launch the frontal attack on Hilli.

=== Pakistani fortifications ===
The Pakistani defenses, consisting of well-dug trenches, bunkers, railway cars repurposed into firing positions, mines, booby-traps and barbed wire were set up for all-round defence of Hilli and covered all of the approaches to the village. North of Hilli is a small locality, Morapara. Wet and soggy paddy fields, marshes and mud surrounded Hilli on all sides except Morapara, where they were patchy at best. Consequently, Morapara was the most well-defended angle of the entire complex and simultaneously the only one from which to attack. The Pakistani 4th Frontier Force (4FF), responsible for the defense of Hilli, had turned Morapara into a stronghold.

=== Indian plan of attack ===
H-Hour was set for the midnight between 22 and 23 November. In the hours preceding the attack, starting a full 12 hours earlier, the artillery guns of the 37th Mountain Regiment, the 38th Medium Regiment and the 100th Mountain Regiment had begun a massive barrage. The barrage ended only moments before the attack began. 8 Guards attacked from the North and West, with "B" and "C" Companies attacking from the north and "A" and "D" Companies attacking from the west. By 0100 hours, "B" and "C" Companies had secured two hamlets north of Morapara and "C" Company and began providing covering fire for "A" and "B" Company, which began the attack on the defenses at Morapara, with "D" Company being held in reserve. During the attack, the battalion was to be supported by four T-55 tanks of 63 Cavalry.

==== Attack on Morapara ====
"A" Company's commander, Major Hemant Manjrekar, was killed almost instantaneously by a burst of machine-gun fire. "A" Company lost all of four of its officers (including Major Manjrekar), all of whom would be found dead mere yards from the Pakistani trenches trying to get their company moving. "B" Company, attacking from the north, also lost its commanding officer, Major R. Nath, almost immediately after the assault on Morapara had begun. Both companies would now be led by Captain S.K. Bansal, Subedar Raj Bahadur Singh and Naib Subedar Mohammed Nayeem. To draw attention away from the Guards, 5 Garwhal was ordered by Brigadier Batti to launch a distracting assault on Basudeopur, a smaller fort adjacent to Morapara. "A" Company of 5 Garwhal quickly overwhelmed and secured its objective but failed to draw forces away from Morapara.

Despite having lost most of its officers, the assault partially succeeded, and the Pakistani defenders were pushed back from portions of Morapara. However, large sections of Morapara remained occupied by the Pakistanis and needed to be cleared. "D" Company was required for that, as both "A" and "B" had suffered heavy casualties. "D" Company's CO, Major K. K. Rao, would also be almost immediately killed by machine-gun fire. Despite taking heavy casualties, the battalion had taken almost all of Morapara, save for the east end.

The four T-55s that were assigned to provide fire support to the attack could not be used by the infantry, as they had become bogged down in the marshland that surrounded the objective.

==== 24 November ====
Over the night of 23 and 24 November, both sides conducted patrols in strength, and Pakistani forces attempted a counterattack. Sometime in the night, 8 Guards were reinforced by a section (four tanks) of PT-76 light tanks from the 69th Armoured Regiment, which aided in the repulsion of the Pakistani counterattack. The PT-76s were dispatched to Morapara, as the Brigade HQ had noticed the failure of the T-55s in those conditions. Supported by the tanks, Second Lieutenant K.S.R. Jain from "C" Company led a column of infantry and armour into East Morapara, before dawn broke on 24 November, and secured the small hamlet. That ended the First Battle of Hilli, which is often referred to as the Battle of Morapara.

== Second Battle of Hilli ==
The 202nd could not achieve its objective, the capture of Hilli, until 11 December and then only in the end because of the success of the 340th Brigade in breaking through Pakistani defences in other areas and in harassing Pakistani supply lines to Hilli. Until then, units from the 202nd had continued to engage 4 FF regularly to keep them distracted and occupied. 4 FF attempted a few counterattacks over the 19 days between 24 November and 11 December, but they were repulsed by 8 Guards and 22 Maratha, which had come in to reinforce the depleted 8 Guards.

For the entirety of 10 December and that night, the surviving mortar platoons, RCL platoons and HMG platoons of 8 Guards relentlessly attacked the positions of 4 FF at Hilli. On the 11th, the Guards, Marathas and Garwhalis swept into Hilli and captured it with little resistance.

== Awards ==
=== Bangladesh ===
- Major Quazi Nuruzzaman was awarded Bir Uttom, the second-highest award for individual gallantry in Bangladesh, but he rejected it as thousands of Mukti Bahini volunteers were killed and did not receive any recognition.

=== India ===
- Maha Vir Chakra; Lt Colonel (Later Major General) Shamsher Singh, 2nd Lt. Shamsher Singh Samra (P), Lance Naik Ram Ugrah Pandey (P), Vir Chakra; Sub. Raj Bahadur Singh (P), Captain Vishnu Sharma, Sena Medal; Major K. K. Rao (P)

=== Pakistan ===
- Major Muhammad Akram Shaheed of Pakistan won the Nishan-E-Haider, the highest military honour of the country.
- Lieutenant Colonel (later Brigadier) Tariq Anees Malik of Pakistan received Sitar-e-Jurat.

== See also ==
- Battle of Turtuk
- Battle of Sylhet
- Battle of Chumb
- Timeline of the Bangladesh Liberation War
- Evolution of Pakistan Eastern Command plan
- Indo-Pakistani wars and conflicts
- Last Stand
