= Inamul Haque Khan =

PAF officer and later Minister

Air Marshal Inamul Haque Khan HJ HI(M) SI(M)

Interior Minister of Pakistan
- In office 14 January 1978 – 5 July 1978
- President: Zia-ul-Haq
- Preceded by: Abdul Qayyum Khan
- Succeeded by: Mahmoud Haroon

Minister of Housing and Works
- In office 1997–1999
- Prime Minister: Nawaz Sharif
- In office 1978–1982
- President: Zia-ul-Haq

Minister for Water and Power
- In office 1980–1981
- President: Zia-ul-Haq

Ambassador of Pakistan to Croatia
- In office 1981–1985
- President: Zia-ul-Haq

Minister of Information and Broadcasting
- In office 1985–1988
- President: Zia-ul-Haq

Personal details
- Born: 25 May 1927 Delhi, British India (Present-day New Delhi, India)
- Died: 10 August 2017 (aged 90) Rawalpindi, Pakistan
- Resting place: PAF Base Nur Khan
- Party: Pakistan Muslim League (N) (1988–2011)
- Education: National Defence University (MSc in War studies); Aligarh Muslim University (B.A., M.A. in Eng Lit.)

Military service
- Allegiance: Pakistan
- Branch/service: Pakistan Air Force
- Years of service: 1949–84
- Rank: Air Marshal
- Commands: PAF Base Dacca; Cmdnt Air War College
- Battles/wars: Indo-Pakistani War of 1965; Indo-Pakistani War of 1971; East Pakistan insurgency
- Awards: Hilal-e-Jurat; Hilal-e-Imtiaz (Military); Sitara-e-Imtiaz (Military)

Inamul Haque Khan HJ HI(M) SI(M) (Urdu: إنعام الحـــق خان ; 25 May 1927 – 10 August 2017) was a three-star air officer in the Pakistan Air Force who is known for his role as AOC of the Dacca airbase of the Pakistan Air Force.

In 1971, Inamul Haque Khan, as Air Commodore, was one of the highest-ranking officers to be taken as a prisoner of war by India after Eastern Command's Commander Lieutenant-General A.A.K. Niazi signed an instrument of surrender with Indian Army's Eastern Command GOC-in-C, Lieutenant-General Jagjit Singh Aurora.

After his repatriation in 1974, he continued to serve in the Air Force with distinction, and eventually joined President General Zia-ul-Haq's administration where he held many cabinet ministries while later being part of the Nawaz Sharif's administration as well.

== Early life and education ==
Inamul Haque Khan was born in Delhi, British India, on 25 May 1927. He was educated at the Aligarh Muslim University where he attained his BA and MA in English literature and briefly tenured as professor of English at the Zakir Husain Delhi College from 1945–47.

== Military career ==
=== Move to Pakistan and war with India ===
In 1948, he emigrated to Pakistan, following the partition of India and joined the Pakistan Air Force after seeing an advertisement. Inamul was directed to attend the RPAF College at Risalpur. He graduated in the class of 5th GD pilot course.

He participated well in the Indo-Pakistani air war during the second war with India in 1965 as Group-Captain, earning recognition as an ace fighter. He received the Sword of Honour both in flying and academic.

=== From Air Commodore to Air Marshal ===
In 1969, he was promoted to one star rank, Air Commodore, in the Pakistan Air Force and was stationed in East Pakistan. In June 1971, he took over as the air officer commanding Dacca airbase from Air Commodore M.Z. Masud. As the war progressed, Air Cdre. Haque was instrumental in getting almost all PAF pilots and their aircraft out of Dacca after the Dhaka Airport was permanently damaged by the Indian Air Force, and had all the air force pilots flown out to Burma. Though it was initially thought that the army aviation's evacuation by air was not possible due to the air superiority enjoyed by the IAF, he also provided his expertise to army aviation pilots to fly out the army helicopters with remaining PAF pilots. He himself, however, stuck to his post till the end of the war and then was taken as a prisoner of war by the Indian Army in 1971.

In 1974, Inamul Haque was repatriated to Pakistan under the agreement signed with India and Bangladesh, and was allowed to continue his service, eventually attaining the three-star rank in the Air Force. Air Vice Marshal Haq had been appointed as the ACAS (Operations) at the Air AHQ, and later commanded Air Defence Command as its AOC-in-C with a three-star rank, Air Marshal. His command assignment also included as Director General Joint Staff at JS HQ.

== Political career ==
=== Zia-ul-Haq administration ===
Air Mshl Haque was appointed as Interior Minister in the Zia administration from 14 January 1978 until 5 July 1978. From 1978-82, he served as the Minister of Housing and Works. In 1980-81, he also led the Ministry of Water and Power. In 1981, he was posted on a diplomatic assignment as an envoy to Croatia until 1985.

=== Nawaz Sharif administration ===
From 1997-99, he served as the Minister of Housing and Works in the second Nawaz Sharif government.

== Last years and death ==
In his later years, he would be associated with the Tablighi Jamaat, in the process abandoning his old interests such as music, drama, bridge and chess.

Air Marshal Inamul Haque Khan died of natural causes on the 10 August 2017 at the age of 90 after being ill for quite some time. His funeral prayers were held at PAF Base Noor Khan on 11 August with full military honours.

== Books ==
A writer, being a regular contributor to the Journal of the Research Society of Pakistan, among his best-known books are:

=== Essays ===
- Motivation in Peace and War, 1976.
- Recollections, 1984.
- Islamic Motivation and National Defence, 1991.
- Libraries and Librarianship, 1991.
- Memoirs of Insignificance, 1999.

=== Poetry ===
- The Evening Songs, 1997.
- Sighs and Satisfaction, 1999.

== Awards and decorations ==
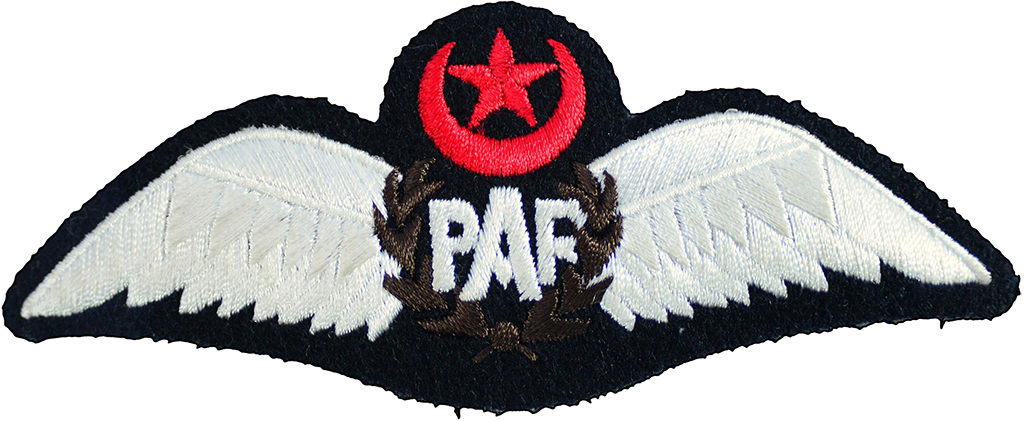

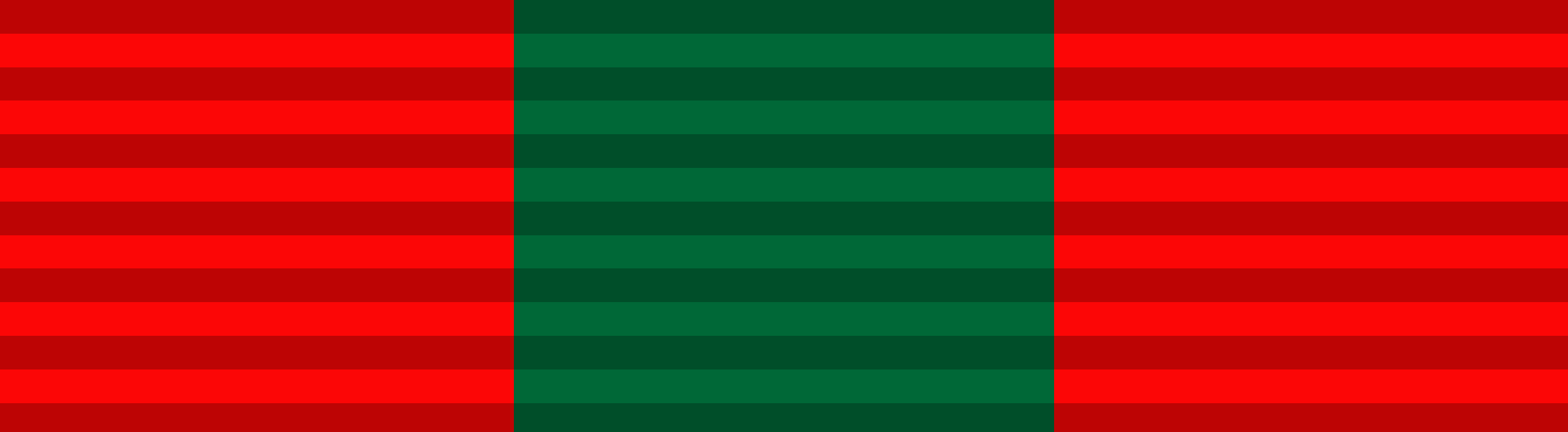

PAF GD(P) Badge RED (More than 3000 Flying Hours)
Hilal-e-Jurat (Crescent of Courage) 1971 War	Hilal-e-Imtiaz (Military) (Crescent of Excellence)		Sitara-e-Imtiaz (Military) (Star of Excellence)
Tamgha-e-Diffa (General Service Medal): 1. 1965 War Clasp; 2. 1971 War Clasp	Sitara-e-Harb 1965 War (War Star 1965)	Sitara-e-Harb 1971 War (War Star 1971)	Tamgha-e-Jang 1965 War (War Medal 1965)
Tamgha-e-Jang 1971 War (War Medal 1971)	Tamgha-e-Sad Saala Jashan-e- Wiladat-e-Quaid-e-Azam (100th Birth Anniversary of Muhammad Ali Jinnah) 1976	Tamgha-e-Jamhuria (Republic Commemoration Medal) 1956	Hijri Tamgha (Hijri Medal) 1979
