= Commander of the Eastern Command (Pakistan) =

Former Pakistani army position

- چیف آف اسٹاف পাকিস্তানের পূর্বাঞ্চলীয় কমান্ডার
- Flag of the Pakistan Army

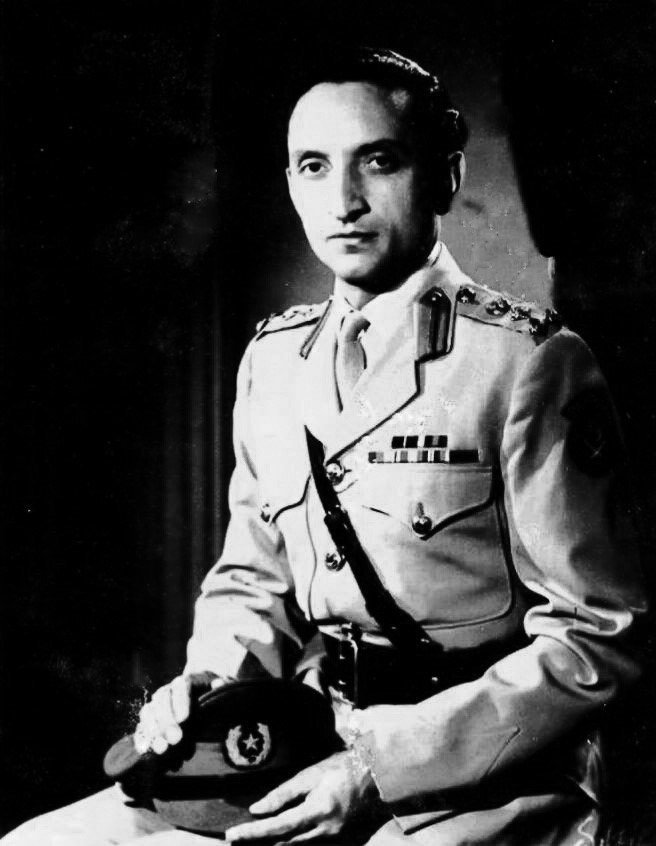
- Longest serving Sahibzada Yaqub Khan; 1 September 1969 – 7 March 1971
- Ministry of Defence
- Abbreviation: CEC
- Member of: General Headquarters GHQ; Army Eastern Command
- Residence: Dacca Cantonment, East Pakistan, Pakistan (now Dhaka, Bangladesh)
- Nominator: C-in-C; Chief of the Army Staff (Pakistan)
- Appointer: President of Pakistan
- Term length: Not fixed
- Precursor: None
- Formation: 1969; 57 years ago
- First holder: Sahabzada Yaqub Khan
- Final holder: A.A.K. Niazi
- Abolished: 16 December 1971; 54 years ago
- Succession: Army Chief of Bangladesh

The Commander of the Eastern Command was the senior most appointment of Eastern Command of the Pakistan Army. Headed by a lieutenant general, the Commander Eastern Command's primary role was to overview the military operations and implementing orders of GHQ in East Pakistan. The position was abolished following the Pakistani Instrument of Surrender.

== Background ==
During Yahya's tenure as President of Pakistan in 1969, he had established a corps size headquarter at Dacca, East Pakistan. Though initially it was known as III Corps, it is mostly known as Eastern Command. The first person to be appointed as Commander Eastern Command was Sahabzada Yaqub Khan.

The last person who held this post was A. A. K. Niazi, who took the command on 10th April 1971. He is often criticized for his military failure in Bangladesh Liberation War, as Pakistan had lost a significant part of it.

== Role and Responsibilities ==
The Commander Eastern Command was the top military figure in East Pakistan. His primary job was to keep peace, handle anti-rebellion efforts, protect the region and implement the direct orders from GHQ. During the 1971 conflict, his duties extended to fighting against the Mukti Bahini & Pro Bengali rebels and working with East Pakistan’s civilian government to protect the sovereignty and suppress the movement.

The Commander reported directly to the Chief of Staff, General Hamid Khan, in Rawalpindi and worked closely with the President of Pakistan, Yahya Khan and the central government. During martial law, the Commander of Eastern Command often held significant political authority in addition to their military role.

== List of Commanders ==
No.	Portrait	Commander Eastern Command	Took office	Left office	Time in office	Notable Facts
01	Yaqub Khan	Lieutenant General; Yaqub Khan (1920–2016)	1 September 1969	7 March 1971	1 year, 187 days	Resigned from his post in March 1971 due to his opposition to the military crackdown in East Pakistan.
02	Tikka Khan	Lieutenant General; Tikka Khan (1915–2002)	7 March 1971	10 April 1971	34 days	Known as “Butcher of Bengal” for initiating Operation Searchlight to suppress dissent.
03	A.A.K. Niazi	Lieutenant General; A.A.K. Niazi (1915–2004)	10 April 1971	16 December 1971	250 days	Commander during insurgency, Signed the instrument of surrender, marking the end of East Pakistan.

== Notable events ==
- Operation Searchlight (March 1971): Initiated by Lieutenant General Tikka Khan, this military operation aimed to suppress the Bengali nationalist movement but resulted in widespread atrocities and increased resistance from the Mukti Bahini.
- Bangladesh Liberation War (April – December 1971): The Eastern Command, under Lieutenant General A. A. K. Niazi, faced a full-scale insurgency supported by India, leading to a decisive defeat and the surrender of 93,000 Pakistani troops in December 1971.
