= Tajammul Hussain Malik =

Pakistan Army general

Major General Tajammul Hussain Malik
- Born: June 13, 1924; Chakwal District, Punjab Province, British Indian Empire
- Died: 2003 (aged 78–79)
- Burial place: Mountains of Chakwal
- Military career
- Allegiance: British India 1946-47; Pakistan 1947-80
- Branch: British Indian Army; Pakistan Army
- Service years: 1946-1980
- Rank: Major General
- Units: Rajput Regiment (British Indian Army); Baloch Regiment (Pakistan Army)
- Commands: 3rd Baluch (1965 war), 205 Brigade (1971-War in East Pakistan), 23rd Infantry Division
- Conflicts: Indo-Pakistani War of 1947; Indo-Pakistani War of 1965; Indo-Pakistani War of 1971; Battle of Hilli

Tajammul Hussain Malik (June 13, 1924 – 2003) was a senior officer in the Pakistan Army and the former General Officer Commanding of the 23rd Division of Pakistan Army, retiring with the rank of major general. He was the commanding officer of Pakistani forces at the Battle of Hilli during the Indo-Pakistani war of 1971, and headed a failed coup attempt against the regime of Zia-ul-Haq in 1980 which resulted in a court-martial held by Judge Advocate General Branch of Pakistan Armed Forces headed by General Zia-ul-Haq.

== Career ==
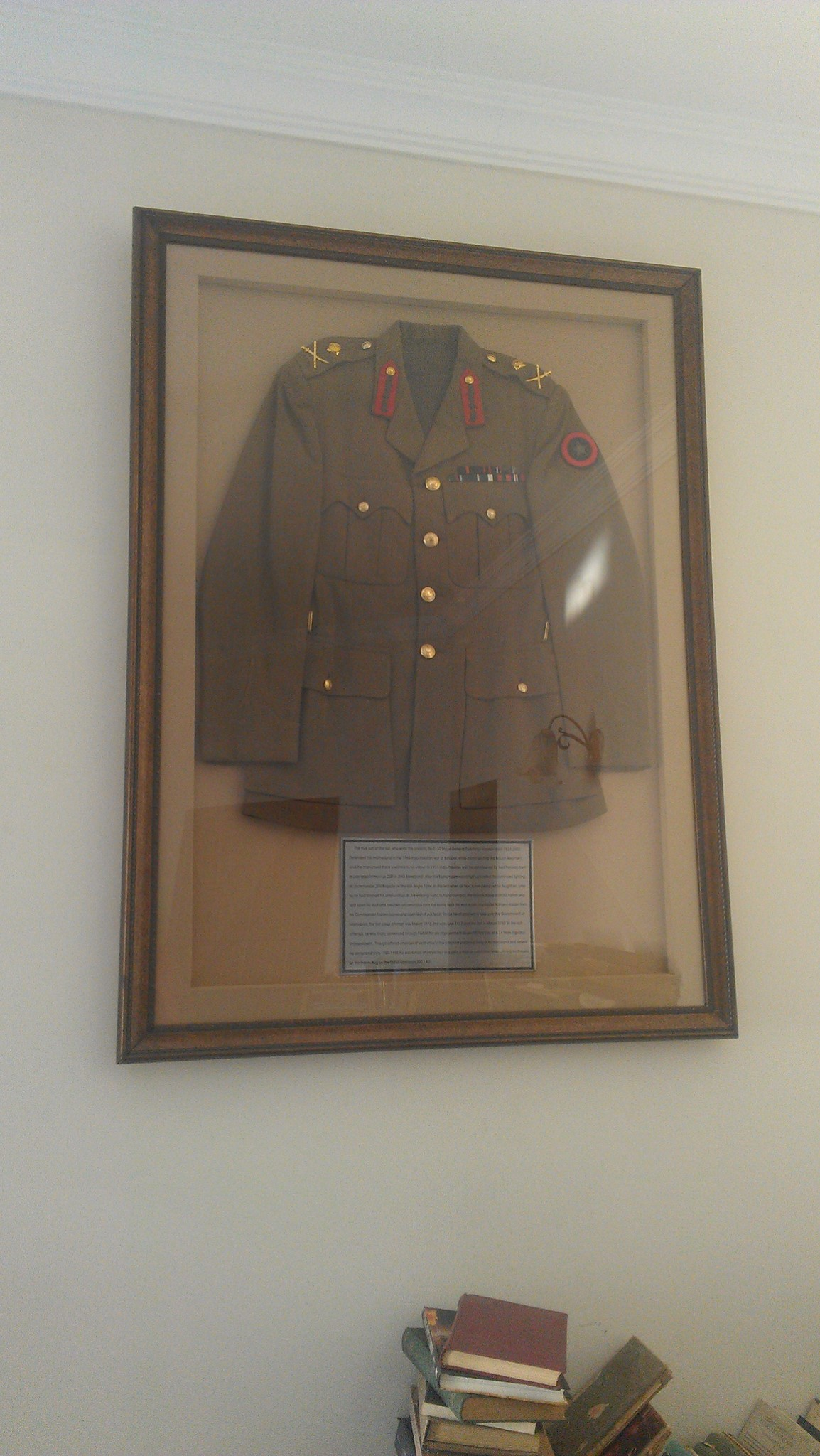
Uniform of General Tajammal Hussain Malik

Tajammul Hussain Malik, from the Awan tribe, was born on June 13, 1924, in the Chakwal District in the Punjab province and became a career officer in the British Indian Army, 7 Rajput Regiment, later joining the army of the new state of Pakistan in 1947. He had participated in Indo-Pakistani War of 1947 and the 1965 War - Battle of Batapur. In 1969, he was promoted as Brigadier, and, in October 1971, he was posted as Director of Staff Duties (DSD) at the General Headquarters. From there, at his personal request to volunteer to fight in East Pakistan, he was posted to 205 Brigade deployed on the Hilli-Bogra Front. He joined the brigade on November 20, 1971, deployed at Hilli in East Pakistan (now Bangladesh).

During the war, he was cited for a live award of Nishan-e-Haider (the highest award for valour in the Pakistani Armed Forces); Malik's unit continued fighting even after Pakistani forces formally surrendered to Indian forces in Dhaka. He was the Commander of the Pakistani Forces in the Battle of Hilli. He was the only red tape Pakistani officer who did not surrender even as his GOC 16 Division had surrendered. He had been taken from the battle field unconscious, and refused to undergo the surrender ceremony and it was his GOC, Major General Nazar Hussain Shah, who went through the surrender ceremony of 205 Brigade to the opposing commander Major General Lachhman Singh. He became a well known war hero in West Pakistan.

== War achievements ==
Malik was the commanding officer of the 3rd Baloch Regiment which had defended Lahore in the 1965 war. He was at the time a Lt Col and had destroyed the Batapur Bridge and defended a vital opening of the grand trunk road to save Lahore on 6 September 1965. A monument has been laid at the site and the day is celebrated in Pakistan as 'Defence Day' to remind the nation of General Tajammul's war efforts and those of the other vital commanding officers.

He was a brigadier during the 1971 Pakistan-India War at the Bangladesh scene. He had volunteered to go and fight while he was director of staff duties at the GHQ (General Headquarters), a coveted position. He took over command of 203 Infantry Brigade and defended Hilli while he was up against an Indian division and a brigade of Bengali insurgents on the then Pakistani soil next to the Indian border. Bogra was surrounded from all sides by the greater numbers of the Indian army and the Mukti Bahini. Brig. Malik (who retired as Maj. Gen.) continued to resist even after the Pakistani Eastern Command surrendered in Dhaka on 16 December. He, in his staff car with flags and stars uncovered, went around the streets of Bogra motivating his soldiers to keep fighting.

The Indian army had, by then, surrounded the city of Bogra. The brigade major (B.M.) along with some 50 other ranks surrendered but Malik, still full of vigour, refused to give up. He ordered the rest of his brigade to break out in small groups to Naogong, where one of his units was still fighting on. However, en route, his jeep was ambushed, severely injuring him and his orderly. Muktis captured both of them and subjected them to torture. They broke his arms and split his head, after which he was taken semi-conscious to an Indian Army hospital. Major General Nazar Hussain Shah was especially flown in from Natore for the surrender of this brigade on 18 December 1971, due to the refusal of Malik to surrender. Upon return from captivity, he was the only brigadier, who fought the 1971 War in East Pakistan to have been promoted to the rank of major general.

== Coup attempt ==
After his release and repatriation to Pakistan and having undergone the Hamoodur Rehman Commission inquiry, he held the command of 23rd Division in Jhelum as a major general. However, he was retired by a military tribunal of the Judge Advocate General Branch headed by Army Chief General Zia-ul-Haq over accusations of attempting to overthrow the government of Zulfiqar Ali Bhutto and install a government headed by General Tajammul in its place.

Malik organized two coups, first of the two on June 26, 1977 (which was aborted later). In 1980, he organized yet another coup attempt against the military regime of Zia-ul-Haq, with many other senior army officers, including his son Naveed Tajammul. The plan was to assassinate Zia-ul-Haq during the Pakistan Day parade on March 23, 1980. However the plot was exposed and Malik, his son (Naveed Tajammal) and the other conspirators were arrested and sentenced to rigorous life imprisonment. Though offered chances of exile, even when the risk of being executed was high, General Malik and his son (Naveed Tajammal) never took the offer to be exiled and preferred their homeland.

== Later life ==
Malik was released from imprisonment in 1988 following the death of Zia-ul-Haq in a plane crash. He published his autobiography, The Story Of My Struggle, in 1991. He joined the field of politics, and twice contested elections for the National Assembly of Pakistan as an independent candidate from Chakwal district. He formed his own Islamic political party in 1977.

His two children Naveed Tajammal and Waseem Pasha Tajammal became politicians, and after retiring from politics entered the business world in the energy and defense sectors.
