= Mitha =

Mitha may refer to:

- Aboobaker Osman Mitha (1923–1999), Pakistan Army general
- Indu Mitha (born 1929), Pakistani dancer and dance teacher
- Mitha Khan Kakar, Pakistani politician elected in 2018
- Mitha Khan Zardari (1918–2011), Pakistani musician
- Mitha, Kapurthala, Punjab, India, a village

== See also ==
- Mithai (disambiguation)
