= 1971 Pakistan Military Officers' Revolt =

1971 Pakistan Mutiny
- Part of Military coups in Pakistan
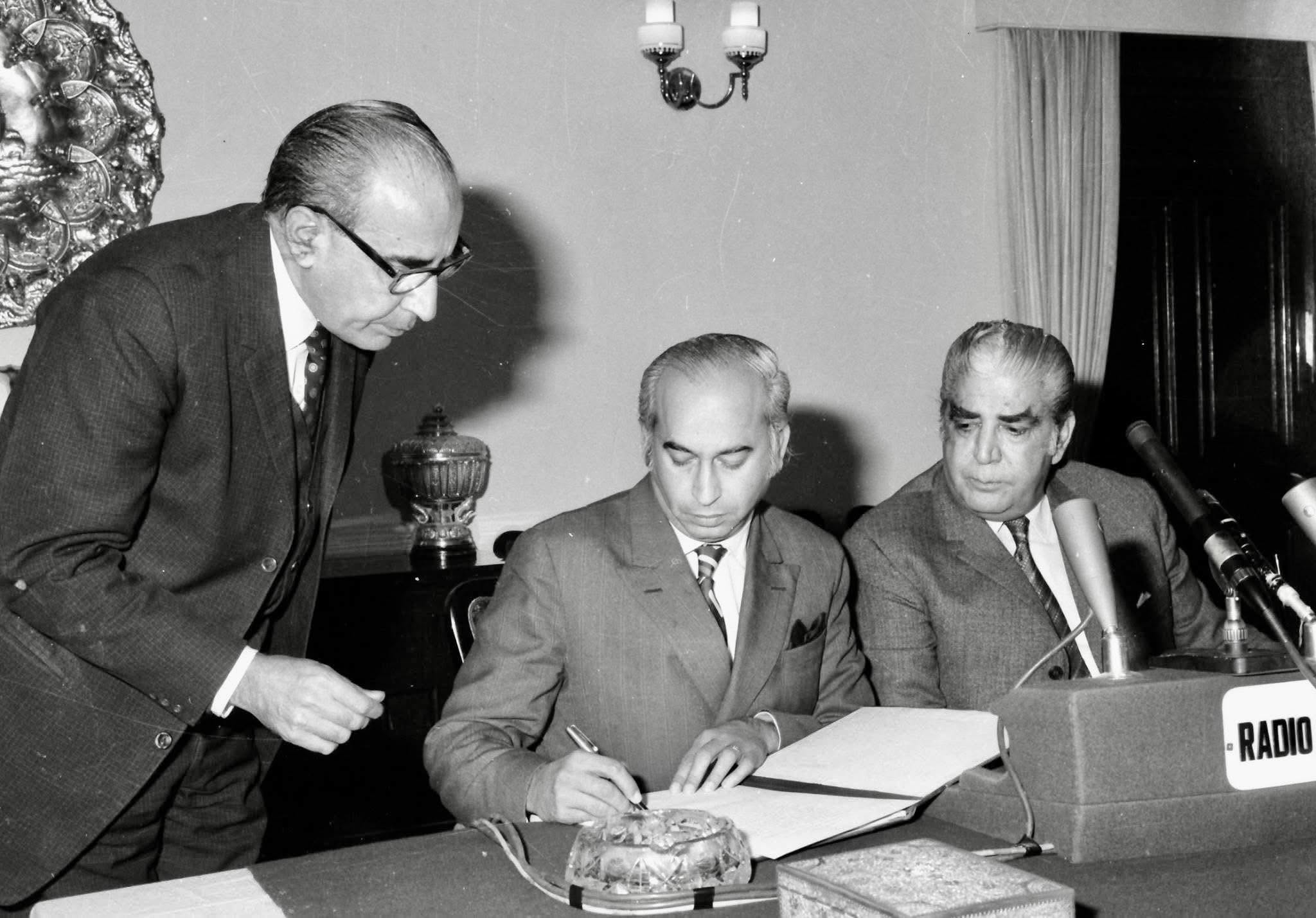
- General Yahya Khan (right) hands over power to Zulfikar Ali Bhutto (center), 20 December 1971
Date	17–20 December 1971
Location	Gujranwala, Punjab, Pakistan
Result	Yahya Khan resigns: Start of the presidency of Zulfikar Ali Bhutto; Release of Sheikh Mujibur Rahman

Belligerents
Government of Pakistan	Pakistan Army mutineers: 6th Armoured Division Artillery; 9th Armoured Brigade; Signals Battalion; 9th Frontier Force Regiment

Commanders and leaders
Yahya Khan; Abdul Hamid Khan (Note: Until 19 December) (Pakistan) S. G. M. M. Peerzada (Pakistan) A. O. Mitha (Pakistan) Iskander Al-Karim	Farrukh Bakht Ali; Iqbal Mehdi Shah; Aleem Afridi; Agha Javed Iqbal; Mohammed Khursheed Hussain; Abdur Rahim Khan (Pakistan) Gul Hassan Khan

1971 Pakistan Military Officer's Revolt, also known as the Majors and Colonels Revolt, refers to the deposition of the Yahya Khan's regime in Pakistan by Pakistani military officers such as Brigadier Farrukh Bakht Ali, Brigadier Iqbal Mehdi Shah, Colonel Aleem Afridi, Colonel Agha Javed Iqbal, Lt Col Mohammed Khursheed Hussain and other officers. Their goal was to overthrow the government and transferring power to the elected civilian representatives. The revolt succeeded as General Yahya Khan and his government resigned, with Zulfikar Ali Bhutto then taking power as president of Pakistan.

== Background ==
The plan to separate East Pakistan from Pakistan had been suggested since 1962 when then president Ayub Khan had requested assistance of West Pakistani politician Abdul Wali Khan to ensure a breakup of Pakistan into two parts, but he refused and insisted to work against him. Ayub also offered an independent East Pakistan to Muhammad Ibrahim, who was the minister of law in Pakistan and a Bengali. Ayub removed Ibrahim because of his refusal and replaced him with Muhammad Munir, who was supportive of Ayub in his attempt to break up Pakistan.

The Santahar massacre (perpetrated by the Mukti Bahini, the Bengali resistance force, and Bengali mobs) led to the deaths of more than 14,000 Muhajirs, Biharis, and West Pakistanis was used by the Pakistan Army as a justification to launch Operation Searchlight against the Bengali nationalist movement. During Operation Searchlight in 1971, many civilians were killed and Bengali nationalists retributed equal amounts of violence on the communities of Muhajirs, Biharis, and West Pakistanis. Due to Operation Searchlight, the Pakistani policemen and military personnel of Bengali origin had deserted and defected to the Mukti Bahini, which led to the start of the Bangladesh Liberation War.

When the news of Pakistan's surrender was broadcast by Pakistani media, the spontaneous and overwhelming public anger over the defeat and over the breakup of Pakistan into two parts led to street demonstrations throughout Pakistan.

== The mutiny ==
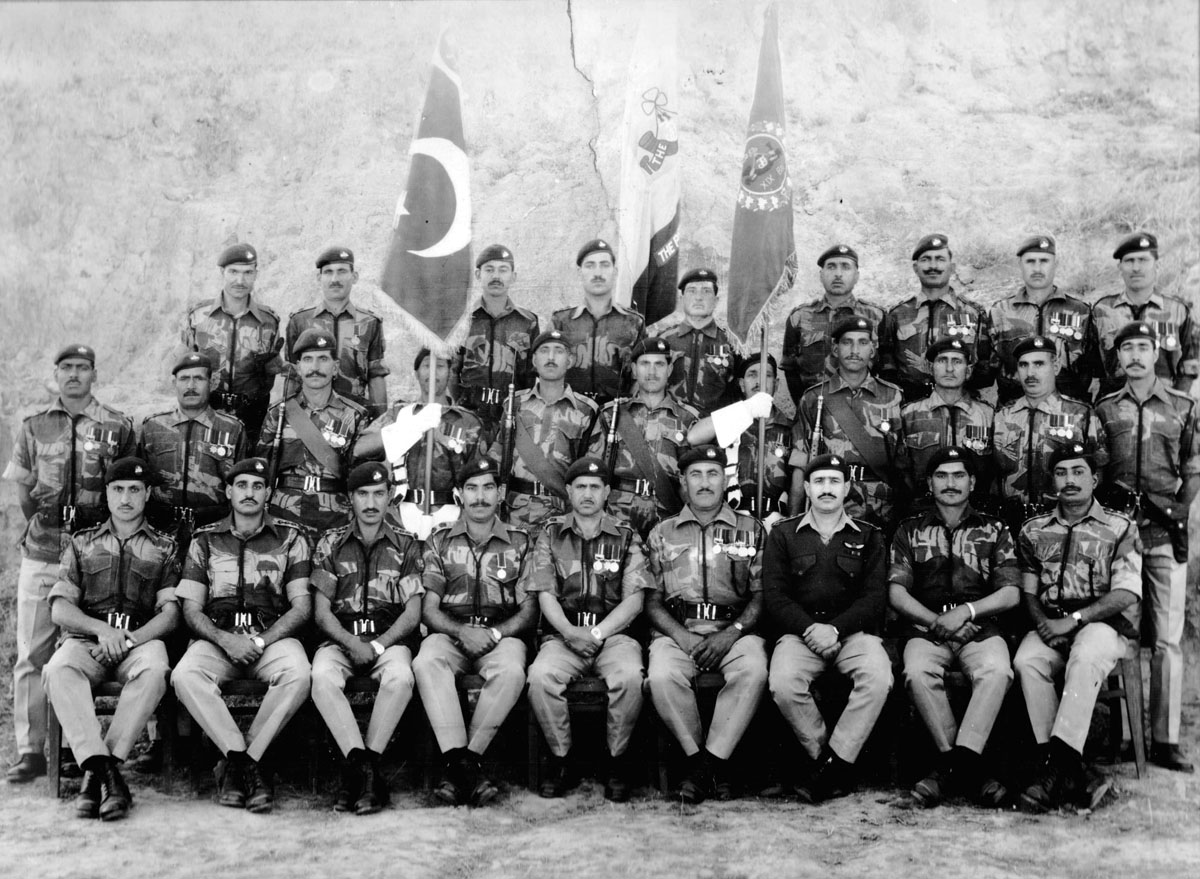
Officers of the 9th Battalion of the Frontier Force Regiment on 23 March 1974

On 17 December 1971 just one day after the surrender by the Pakistan Army's Eastern Command, Brigadier Farrukh Bakht Ali, who was an Army officer, wrote his resignation letter, accepting his own responsibility for the loss of East Pakistan and expected that Yahya Khan and his advisers would follow suit and also resign. But the next day Brigadier Ali had heard that President General Yahya was planning to create a new constitution, which infuriated Ali. Brigadier Ali determined that the loss of the war with India was enough and that it was imperative to get rid of Yahya's military government. He gathered up other army officers such as Brigadier Iqbal Mehdi Shah, Colonel Aleem Afridi, Colonel Agha Javed Iqbal, Lt Col Khursheed, and others and told them that they owed it to Pakistan to get rid of the discredited junta and hand over power to the elected civilian representatives of 1970 Pakistani general election.

All officers present, agreed. However, there was a problem as more senior officers such as Maj Gen Bashir "Ranghar", Major General R.D. Shamim, and Major General "Bachoo" Karim were in Gujranwala and had the authority to counter Farrukh Bakht Ali's orders.

On 19 December 1971, Farrukh Bakht Ali arrested the three generals and seized command of Major General "Bachoo" Karim's 6th Armoured Division. Brigadier Ali then sent Colonel Aleem Afridi and Colonel Agha Javed Iqbal to deliver a letter demanding Yahya Khan's resignation by 8 PM that night for being responsible for the loss of East Pakistan. The two colonels took the letter to Chief of General Staff Gul Hassan, who initially felt saddened by the defeat in the war and told them that he planned to leave the army. However, upon learning about the contents of the letter from the two Colonels, Hassan's mood brightened, and he went to Air Marshal Abdur Rahim Khan. Hassan told Colonel Aleem Afridi and Colonel Agha Javed Iqbal to sit in Major Javed Nasir's office.

Earlier in the day, during an address by General Abdul Hamid Khan in Gujranwala, young officers, led by Brigadier Fazal-e-Rasiq Khan, unleashed a barrage of insults in English, Urdu, and Punjabi towards Abdul Hamid, Yahya Khan, and other superiors. They called them "bloody bastards," "debauches," and "drunkards", expressing their deep frustration.

== Aftermath and Reactions ==
General Abdul Hamid Khan was rushed out of the auditorium and sought advice from Major General Abu Bakr Osman Mitha, who stated that he could deploy Special Service Group troops to prevent a potential takeover by 6 Division but there were not enough troops. Major General Abu Bakr Osman Mitha then reached out to Brigadier Ali suggesting that Abdul Hamid Khan should take over from Yahya Khan. Brigadier Ali refused stating that Hamid was too close to Yahya Khan and was just as responsible for the loss of East Pakistan. Lt Gen. S. G. M. M. Peerzada, Principal Staff Officer to Yahya Khan, is said to have ordered SSG commandos to carry out an air assault on the Mangla HQ and arrest F. B. Ali and other officers. The order was refused as it was not possible.

Meanwhile, the reports of near mutiny in Gujranwala prompted Gul Hassan Khan and Air Marshal Abdur Rahim Khan to go to Yahya Khan, requesting him to resign. Abdur Rahim Khan had threatened to bring in the Pakistan Air Force to back the mutiny while General Hassan told Yahya that the junior brass of the Army were also not happy with him. A Pakistan International Airlines flight was sent to fetch Zulfikar Ali Bhutto from New York City, where he was presenting Pakistan's case before the United Nations Security Council on the East Pakistan Crisis. Bhutto returned home on 18 December 1971. On 20 December, he was taken to the President House in Rawalpindi, where he took over two positions from Yahya Khan, one as the President (a position which had been under the control of the military since 1958) and the other as the first civilian Chief Martial Law Administrator.

Within hours of Yahya Khan stepping down, President Bhutto reversed the Judge Advocate General Branch's verdict against East Pakistani leader Sheikh Mujibur Rahman and instead released him, allowing him to fly to London. President Bhutto also issued orders for the house arrest of Yahya, the man who imprisoned Mujib in the first place. Both actions made news headlines around the world.

== See also ==
- Tikka Khan
- Operation Grand Slam
- Indo-Pakistani war of 1971
- List of wars involving Pakistan
