= M. I. Karim =

Bangladeshi army officer (d. 2018)

Iskander Al-Karim
- Born: 23 November 1924
- Died: 4 February 2018 (aged 93); Dhaka, Bangladesh
- Alma mater: Indian Military Academy
- Military career
- Allegiance: (British Raj) British India (1945–1947); Pakistan (Before 1972); Bangladesh
- Branch: British Indian Army; Pakistan Army; Bangladesh Army
- Service years: 1945–1974
- Rank: Major General
- Nickname: Bacchu
- Units: Central India Horse; Armoured Corps
- Commands: CO of 15th Lancers; Commander of 5th Armoured Brigade; GOC of 6th Armoured Division
- Conflicts: Indo-Pakistani war of 1947–1948; Indo-Pakistani war of 1965; Bangladesh Liberation War (as POW); 1971 Pakistan Military Officer's Revolt
- Awards: Sitara-e-Quaid-e-Azam; Tamgha-e-Pakistan

Mohammad Iskander Al-Karim, SQA, TPk awc, psc, natively known as Bacchu Karim, was a Bengali major general. He most notably was the commander of the Pakistan Army's 6th Armoured Division in Gujranwala.

== Military career ==
Karim graduated from the Indian Military Academy. He was commissioned into the Central India Horse on 20 January 1945 in Greece. During his military career, he served in the 19 Lancers. As a major, he served in the Pakistan Military Academy as the company commander of Khalid Company. On 4 September 1965, he was appointed commanding officer of the 15 Lancers. He served till 27 February 1967. Later he served as the commander of the 5th Armoured Brigade. He eventually reached the rank of major general in the Pakistan Army.

=== Bangladesh Liberation War ===
Prior to Operation Searchlight, then-brigadier Karim was the officer-in-charge of civil affairs at the HQ, CMLA.

Later on, in 1971, he was promoted to major general and made GOC of the 6th Armoured Division in Gujranwala. During the war, he was kept under close surveillance, with Major General Bashir Ahmad openly telling his staff officers that he was to keep an eye on Bacchu Karim.

=== Military officer's revolt ===
After the defeat of Pakistani forces in the Bangladesh Liberation War, his junior officers revolted against Yahya Khan. They made him send a flash message to Chief of General Staff Lt. General Gul Hassan Khan, which stated their demand for the army top brass to be changed. During the revolt, he was confined to a caravan and forcibly relieved of his command. Afterwards, Brigadier F.B. Ali took control of the division and successfully got Yahya Khan to resign.

== Repatriation and retirement ==
After Bangladesh became independent, he was repatriated to Bangladesh in 1973. He was forcibly retired upon repatriation because of his continued involvement with the Pakistan Army's higher command, up until the military officer's revolt. After retirement, he founded the Vantage Group of Companies.

== Death ==
In 2018, he died at the age of 94.
