= Amna Mawaz Khan =

Pakistani classical dancer and activist (born 1989)

- آمنہ مواز خان
- Born: Amna Mawaz Khan; July 22, 1989 (age 37); Rawalpindi, Pakistan
- Occupations: Dancer, activist
- Organization: Women Democratic Front

Amna Mawaz Khan (Urdu: آمنہ مواز خان, born July 22, 1989) is a Pakistani dancer, theatre artist, feminist and political worker. She is a founding member of Women Democratic Front.

== Early life and education ==
Khan was born in Rawalpindi on July 22, 1989. She got her early education from Khaldunia High School, Islamabad. She completed her bachelor's degree in arts from University of the Punjab. She studied her master's degree in Pakistan studies in 2013 from National Institute of Pakistan Studies, Quaid-i-Azam University Islamabad. She is doing Masters in transcultural studies at the Heidelberg University.

== Dance ==
Khan began classical dance learning at the age of 11 from renowned dancer Indu Mitha in her school, Mazmoon-e-Shauq and learnt from her for 11 years. After that, she started teaching dance for six years. Khan also did a short course in contemporary dance and choreography from Trinity Laban Conservatoire in Greenwich, London, England.

From 2016 to 2018, Khan worked as dance instructor and head choreographer of the permanent dance ensemble, the National Performing Arts Group, at the Pakistan National Council of Arts, Islamabad. Khan aims to preserve this rare classical dance in the country and pass the art on to others.

Khan has also learnt and explored Kathak, Uday Shankar's style of dance and Pakistani folk dances. She has performed and given workshops across Pakistan as well as in America, China, India, Switzerland and the United Kingdom. She has performed on various occasions with Tehreema Mitha (daughter of Indu Mitha), who is also a renowned classical dancer, living in USA. Khan has performed her dance in many art and literature festivals. Khan was featured in a documentary "How She Moves" which was displayed in Portland Film Festival.

She wrote a perspective Raqs-e-Mahavaar in the book Period Matters: Menstruation in South Asia written by Farah Ahamed with expressions through Bharatanatyam choreography and its genesis.

She performed in 16th International Urdu Conference in Arts Council of Pakistan Karachi in December 2023.

== Theatre art ==
Khan is a peace and social activist and a feminist. She helped in making of the socialist, progressive art collective Laal Hartaal. She performed on various occasions with members of Laal Hartaal in Women Marches, Student Marches, Art festivals, Faiz Amn Mela. and climate action day event.

Khan often works with the Pakistan National Council of the Arts, Theatrewallay and Kuch Khaas in their creative productions.

She is a member of the Magdalena Project which facilitates support and training to cross-cultural network of women's theatre and performance. She curated the exhibition "Peepal and Banyan" in Berlin, featuring the work of contemporary artists from Pakistan.

== Politics ==
Khan is also a left wing political worker. Her activism began in 2007, during the emergency imposed under dictatorship, she was a student then. She mobilized students for protest demonstrations, wrote, acted and directed for street theatre. She joined the Awami Workers Party in 2012 when it was founded. Since then, Khan has been active in campaigns for release of progressive political prisoners and movements on housing rights, women issues, students, transgender people, peasants and minorities. Khan also stood in the local body elections of Islamabad in 2015 as Awami Workers Party's (AWP) candidate for vice chairman in UC-28. Since 2007, Khan is working as political organizer and a feminist.

She is founding member of Women Democratic Front, a feminist, socialist organization.

In March 2016, she also delivered a TED talk on "Identification and rectification of socially constructed barriers" in Islamabad. She has used theatre and dance to create awareness for climate justice due to recent devastating floods in Pakistan.

== Notable works ==
- Jathiswaram Duet
- Dukhi
- A Perception (2015): Short drama, directed and written by Hassan Ahmed Raja
- Hum gunehgar aurtain’: Kishwar Naheed's well known satirical poem, ‘Hum gunehgar aurtain’ (we sinful women) in honour of women who struggle every day against the injustices and oppression of a patriarchal society; an affirmation of the beauty; strength and power of womanhood.
- Khabaram Raseeda: Hazrat Amir Khusrows khabaram raseeda, ‘in the hope of a new beginning where everything is encompassed by love.
- Barzakh
- Situation 101
- Mehergarh
- Zulm rahe aur amn bhi ho: based on Habib Jalib's poem Zulm rahe aur amn bhi ho, paying homage to Mashal.
- Niqab
- Featured in How She Moves (2018): Documentary, a tribute to Indu Mitha
- Teen Taal: Based on Malkauns raga dates back to Emperor Akbar's court. The performance with technical dance, called Alarippu in multiple styles of manipuri, khattak and bharatnatyam, is considered the foundation of bharatnatyam taught to every student.
- Hazaron Khwahishein Aisi’ (A thousands yearnings)
- Jaal: organized by Kuch Khas
- Saavan
- Aamad
- Ae Ri Sakhi
- Be Maut Muaato Laaye Kutha
- When All of This is Over
- Azad Aurat: Poem by Rubina Ahmed
- Kabhi Hum Bhi Khoobsurat Thay
- Saans Lenay Do
- no man's land
- Kya Aisa Jahan Mumkin Hai?
- Ye Hosla Kaise Jhuke
- Dharti ka dam ghut'ta hy
- Qalandar
- Iss Paar aur Uss Paar
