= F. B. Ali =

Pakistani military officer (1929–2021)

Farrukh Bakht Ali
- فرخ بخت علی
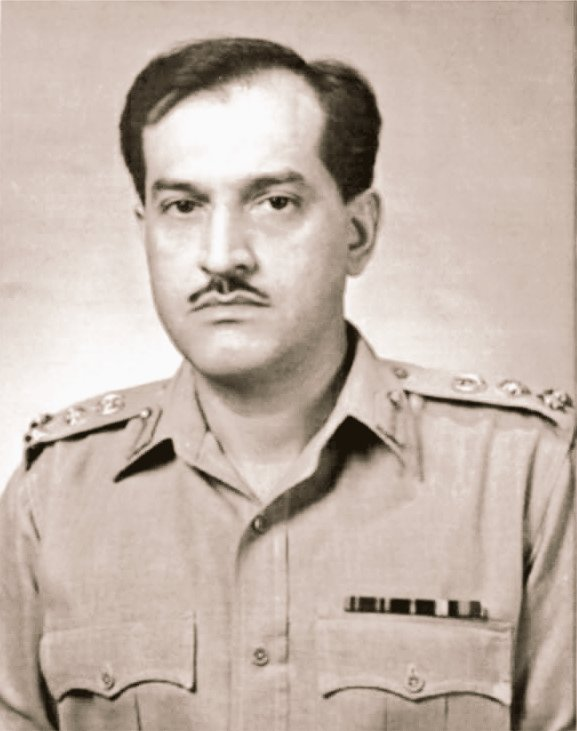
- Military portrait of Ali.
- Born: 8 February 1929; Delhi, British Raj
- Died: 21 February 2021 (aged 92); Canada
- Education: Government College, Lahore; Pakistan Military Academy
- Military career
- Allegiance: Pakistan
- Branch: Pakistan Army
- Service years: 1947–1973
- Rank: Brigadier
- Unit: Pakistan Army Infantry Corps
- Commands: Artillery Army Reserve North; 6th Armoured Division
- Conflicts: Indo-Pakistani War of 1965; Indo-Pakistani War of 1971; Battle of Turtuk; 1971 Military Revolt

Farrukh Bakht Ali (8 February 1929 – 21 February 2021) was a one-star rank officer of the Pakistan Army. He played a vital role in the 1971 Pakistan Military Officer's Revolt, which led to the removal of President Yahya Khan from power.

== Early life and education ==
Farrukh Bakht Ali was born in Delhi, British Raj to a Patiala family. His family had been serving in the Police service for decades. While his father was posted at Lahore, he was enrolled into Government College Lahore. During his student days, he was actively involved in Muslim League campaigns. He had met Khurshid Anwar, the then key political figure who initiated an armed struggle in Kashmir. Though Ali wanted to join Anwar's plan, he later decided to join the Pakistan Army following his father's advice.

== Military career ==
Ali was commissioned in Pakistan Army in November 1948 in Artillery Regiment. During his military career, he served at various capacities, which includes 1st Mountain Regiment, 7th Field Regiment and 9th Medium Regiment. He was the commanding officer of 44th SP Field Regiment.

As a colonel, he had served as Chief of Staff of the 18th Division. Getting promoted to the rank of Brigadier, he was appointed as Deputy Commandant of Pakistan Military Academy. Later he commanded the 6th Armored Division Artillery. Before his retirement, he held the appointment of Commandant of School of Artillery.

== 1971 Mutiny ==
The surrender of Pakistani forces in eastern command coupled with losses in the 1947–48 and 1965 wars made numerous officers furious, one of them were Ali. Ali had written his resignation letter and expected Yahya Khan and his cabinet to do so. But when he learned about the fact that Yahya was planning to establish a new constitution, it made him furious.

Reportedly, Ali arrested three generals and had taken the command of 6th Armoured Division. He sent his representatives, Aleem Afridi and Javed Iqbal who were serving as colonel. They went to meet CGS Gul Hassan. Hassan later went to meet Air Marshal Abdur Rahim Khan, as both of them wanted Yahya's resignation.

Getting backlash for poor performance and facing a revolt of his own army, Yahya was forced to surrender, handing over the power of Zulfiqar Ali Bhutto.

== Imprisonment ==
In 1973, Brigadier Ali was court-martialed under Zulfikar Ali Bhutto's government on charges of conspiring against the state. The proceedings were overseen by then Major General Zia-ul-Haq, who later, as Army Chief, ordered Ali’s release in 1978 after five years in prison, overriding his original life sentence.
