= Pride of Performance Awards (2020–2029) =

Pride of Performance

Awarded by Government of Pakistan
- Type: Literary award
- Established: March 19, 1957
- Country: Islamic Republic of Pakistan
- Ribbon
- Awarded for: "meritorious contribution to the field of literature, arts, sports, medicine and science".
- Status: Active

Statistics
- First induction: 1958
- Last induction: 2020

Pride of Performance award recipients
Category	Number of recipients (2020)
Arts	17
Science	12
Literature	6
Sports	3
Education	3
Social work	1
Other	1

The Pride of Performance is a civil award presented annually on independence day (14 August) by the president to the Pakistani citizens and foreign people in recognition of their contribution to the art, sports, literature, science and education. It also seeks to recognize the "meritorious contribution" to the national interest of Pakistan. It is the highest literary award bestowed by Pakistan.

== 2020 ==
In 2020, the government of Pakistan presented forty-three Pride of Performance awards to the people working in different fields as described by its eligibility criteria.

Key
# Indicates a posthumous honour

Awardee	Field	Category	Country/Province
Waris Baig	Film playback singing	Singing	Punjab
Kiran Iqbal	Science	Chemistry	Sindh
Taj Joyo (Note: declined to receive the award)	Literature	Poet	Sindh
Shakeel Abbas Rofi	Science	Engineering (nuclear)	Sindh
Zahid Noor Peracha	Science	Engineering (electronics)	Sindh
Humayun Saeed	Arts	Acting	Sindh
Sakina Samo	Arts	Acting	Sindh
Mohammed Ali Shehki	Arts	Singing	Sindh
Salman Hashmi	Arts	Formatting & Scanning	Sindh
Zulfiqar Ali Lund	Arts	Instrumentalist	Sindh
Abdul Qudoos Arif alias (A. Q. Arif)	Arts	Painting	Sindh
Mahtab Mahboob	Literature	Writer	
Hina Nasrullah	Arts	Sufi Singer/ Naat Khuwan	Punjab
Ali Zafar	Arts	Singing	Punjab
Salman Ghani	Journalism		Punjab
Muhammad Aslam Ansari	Literature	Poet/writer	Punjab
Resham	Arts	Acting	Punjab
Krishan Gee	Arts	Singing	Punjab
Khalid Masud Gondal	Education	academic and physician	Punjab
Saleem Akhtar	Science	Engineering (mechanical)	Punjab
Amir Shahzad	Science	Engineering	Punjab
Muhammad Mazhar Iqbal	Science	Engineering (chemical)	Punjab
Umar Asghar	Science	Engineering (electrical)	Punjab
Munir Ahmed	Science	Engineering (process control and aging management)	Punjab
Inam Ur Rehman	Science	Engineering (nuclear)	Punjab
Liaqat Ali	Science	(Laser and Optics)	Punjab
Muhammad Baqir	Arts	Fresco Painting	Punjab
Shafique Farooqi	Arts	Painting/Calligraphy	Punjab
Asif Ali Khan	Arts	Qawwali singer	Punjab
Indu Mariam Mitha	Arts	Choreography	Punjab
Mirza Athar Baig	Literature	Writer	Punjab
Tariq Jamil	Religion	Islamic scholar	Punjab
Muhammad Irfan	Sports	Kabaddi	Punjab
Haider Ali	Sports	Paralympic Athlete	
Muhammad Fuzail	Science	Chemistry	Khyber Pakhtunkhwa
Qurrat-ul-Ain	Science	Plasma Physics	Khyber Pakhtunkhwa
Raisa Begum Gul	Education	Nursing	Khyber Pakhtunkhwa
Naimatullah alias Naimat Sarhadi	Education	Nursing	Khyber Pakhtunkhwa
Soraiya Khan alias Mahjabeen Qazalbash	Arts	Singing	Khyber Pakhtunkhwa
Muhammad Faheem	Arts	Wood Lacque	Khyber Pakhtunkhwa
Abaseen Yousufzai	Literature	Writer	Khyber Pakhtunkhwa
Farhan Mehboob	Sports	Squash	Khyber Pakhtunkhwa
Abdul Majid Qureshi	Social work	Activist	Khyber Pakhtunkhwa
Daryan Khan	Arts	Musical instruments maker	Balochistan
Muhammad Yousuf alias Yousuf Gichki	Literature	Writer	Balochistan
Sarmad Sehbai	Arts	Playwright/poet	Islamabad
Ruth Wenny Lekardal	—N/a	Service to Pakistan	Sweden

== See also ==
- Pride of Performance Awards (2010–2019)
