= S. G. M. M. Peerzada =

Pakistani military person

S. G. M. M. Peerzada SPk SQA
- ایس جی ایم ایم پیرزادہ
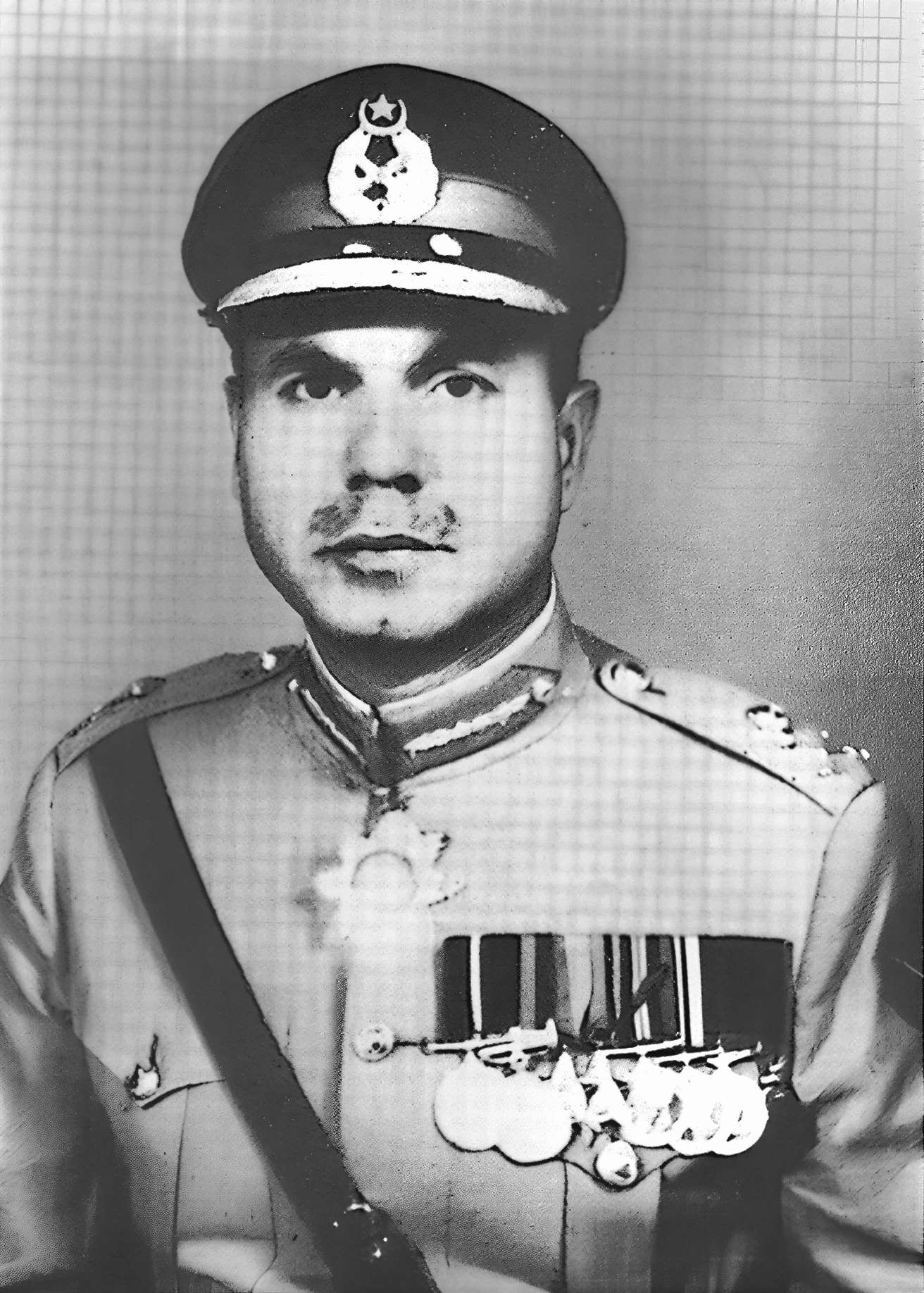
- Official military portrait c. 1966
- Born: 14 March 1918; Bombay, British India (now Mumbai, india)
- Died: 1993 (aged 74-75); Rawalpindi, Punjab, Pakistan
- Education: St. Xavier's College (BA, Hons); Staff College, Camberley
- Military career
- Allegiance: British India; Pakistan
- Branch: British Indian Army (1941–1947); Pakistan Army (1947–1971)
- Service years: 1941—1971
- Rank: Lieutenant General
- Nickname: "Peeroo"
- Unit: 8th Punjab Regiment
- Conflicts: World War II; Burma Campaign; Indo-Pakistani war of 1965; Bangladesh Liberation War; Indo-Pakistani war of 1971
- Awards: Sitara-i-Pakistan; Sitara-i-Quaid-e-Azam; Mentioned in Despatches (1)

Sayad Ghulam Mohamad Mohiuddin Peerzada (Note: Urdu: سید غلام محمد محی الدین پیرزادہ) (14 March 1918 – 1993) known as S. G. M. M. Peerzada, was a Pakistani three-star rank general who served as Principal Staff Officer to President Yahya Khan from 1969 to 1971. Described as the Prime minister and the "Rasputin" of the regime, he headed the Headquarters of the Chief Martial Law Administrator.

== Early life and education ==
Sayad Ghulam Mohamad Mohiuddin Peerzada was born on 14 March 1918 in Bombay. He graduated from St. Xavier's College in 1939, with a Bachelor of Arts Honours degree. Peerzada's family still live in the Bombay area.

== Military career (1941-1971) ==
=== British Indian Army & World War II ===
He received an emergency commission into the 8th Punjab Regiment of the British Indian Army on 15 May 1941, with the service number E.C. 518. During World War II, he saw action in the Burma campaign.

In October 1944, Lieutenant (temporary Captain) Peerzada was among several officers mentioned in despatches in recognition of "gallant and distinguished services" in Burma and the Eastern Frontier of India.

=== Pakistan Army ===
During the Partition of India, Major Peerzada opted for the Pakistan Army, initially arriving in Dhaka, East Pakistan in December 1947.

Temporary Lieutenant Colonel Peerzada completed the 21st course of the Staff College, Camberley which ended on 13 December 1950. He later became an instructor at Command and Staff College Quetta.

In December 1962, Brigadier Peerzada participated as an aide to the Pakistani delegation during the Kashmir bilateral talks with India in Rawalpindi.

Brigadier Peerzada was appointed as the Military Secretary to President Ayub Khan on 5 April 1963. In 1964, Peerzada suffered a heart attack, in which he had to be hospitalized several times at the General Headquarters. As a result, Ayub Khan relieved him of his post as military secretary.

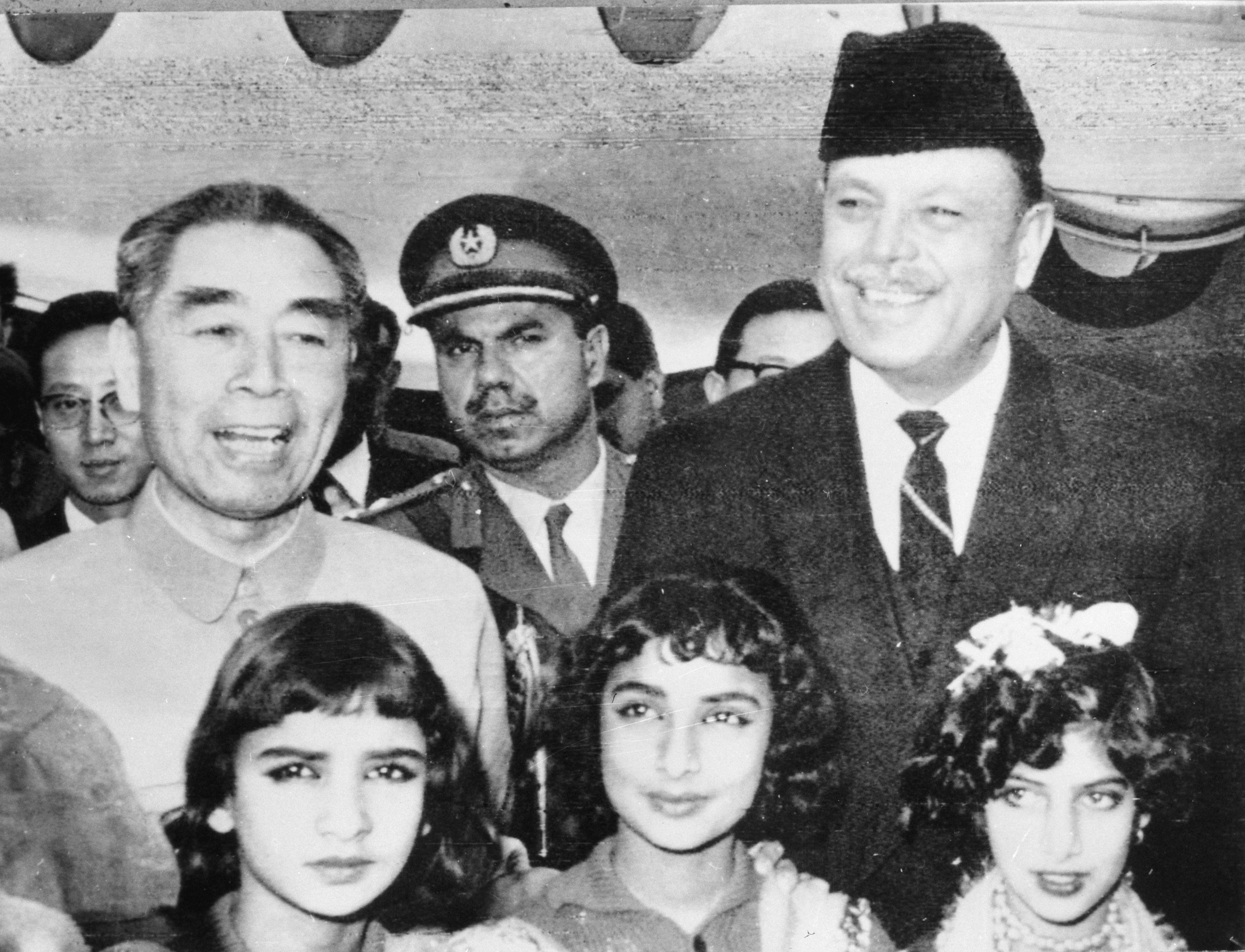
President Ayub Khan with Chinese Premier Zhou Enlai. Brigadier Peerzada is seen behind both, 1964.

Subsequently at the GHQ, he served in various staff roles, such as Chief joint secretary. In the aftermath of the India–Pakistan war of 1965, Peerzada contested diplomatic border resolutions proposed by Mahmood Shafquat of the Foreign Office. on 10 May 1966, Peerzada was promoted to Major-General and appointed as the Adjutant General of the Pakistan Army.

==== Yahya Khan Junta ====
Peerzada served as Principal Staff Officer of President Yahya Khan during the political crisis in East Pakistan in early 1971. He was part of the Pakistani leadership involved in talks with the Awami League in March 1971. Peerzada conveyed assurances that the military government would respond after consultations with Yahya Khan regarding the handover of power to the elected representatives. He played a vital role during the negotiation phase preceding Operation Searchlight in East Pakistan.

==== Military decision-making ====
On 25 March 1971, the Pakistan Army launched Operation Searchlight. Peerzada was among the senior officers serving within Yahya Khan's central military administration at the time the operation was launched. Peerzada's role during this period was mainly administrative and advisory. He held no field command during the Bangladesh Liberation War.

During his time in service, General Peerzada was awarded the Sitara-i-Pakistan and Sitara-i-Quaid-e-Azam.

During the 1971 Pakistan Military Officers' Revolt, Peerzada is said to have ordered SSG commandos to carry out an air assault on the Mangla HQ and arrest F. B. Ali and other officers. The order was refused as it was not possible.

== Post war ==
In December 1971, Peerzada was reportedly dismissed from military service following the India–Pakistan war of 1971. For his influence in the military regime, he was known as prime minister of the military regime. On 22 February 1973, he was placed under house arrest at his home in Rawalpindi.

The Hamoodur Rahman Commission recommended that Peerzada along with General Yahya Khan and other officers, be tried in public on charges of conspiring to usurp power from President Ayub Khan and rigging the 1970 Pakistani general election.

Air Cdre Sajad Haider described Peerzada as "a despised intriguer, who was widely disliked in the army for his machinations."

== Awards and decorations ==
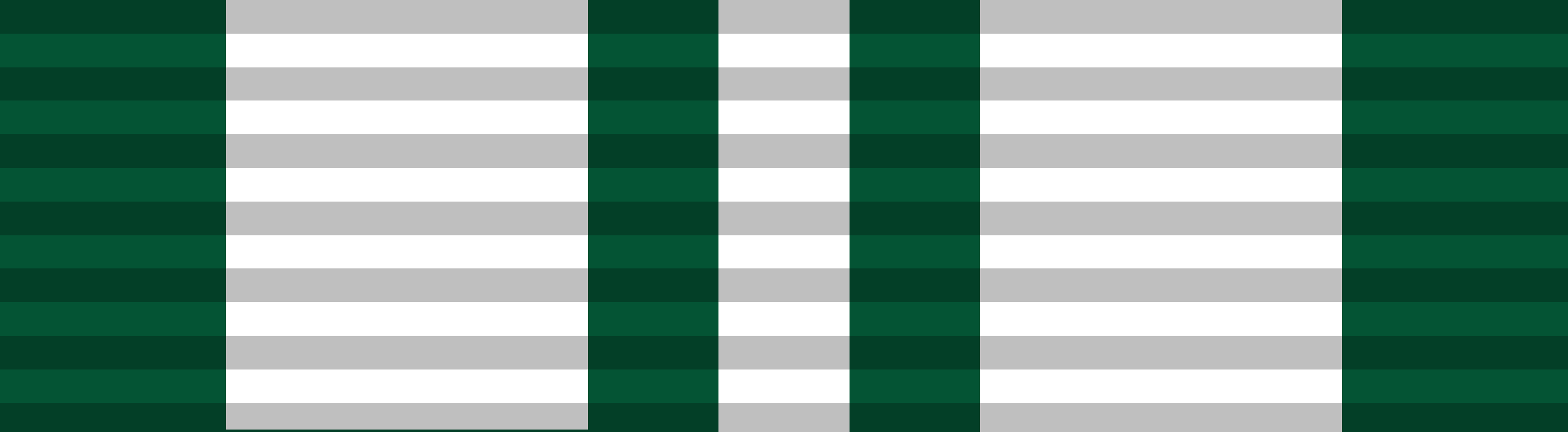
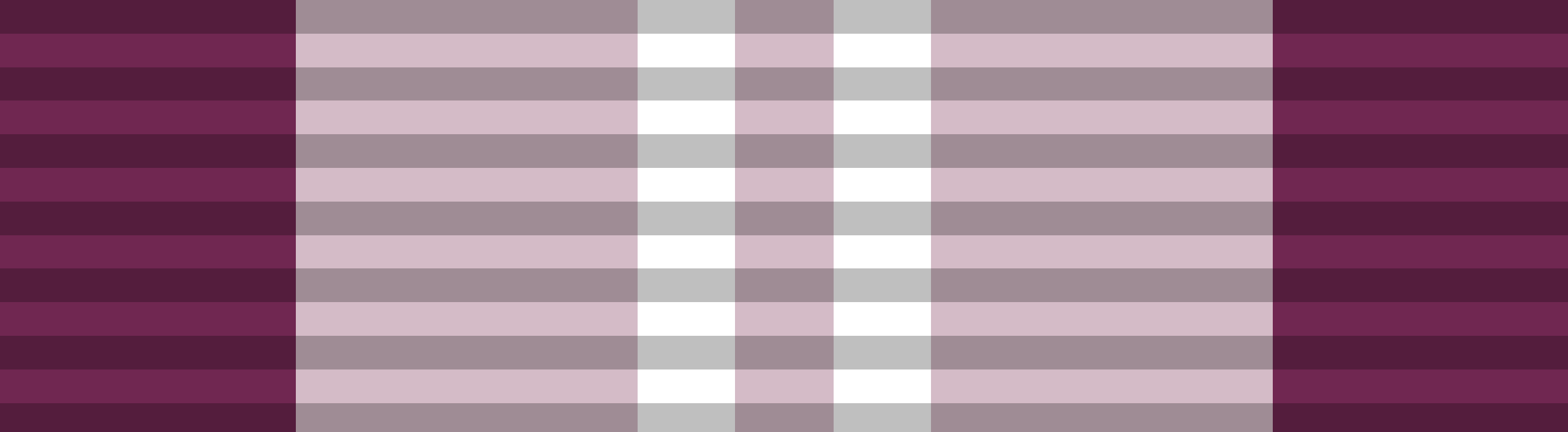

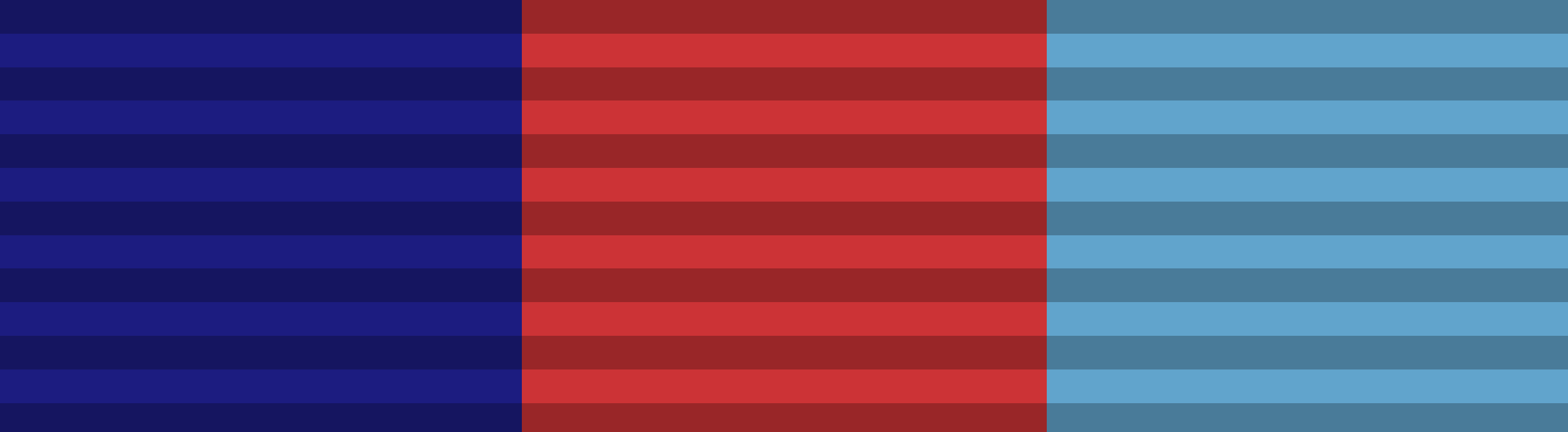

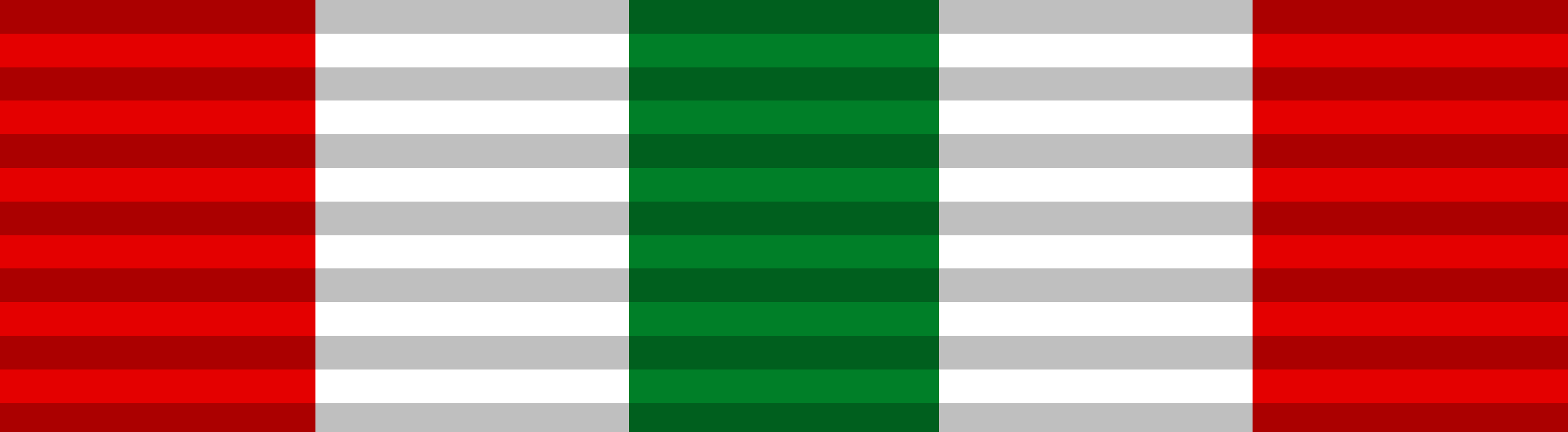

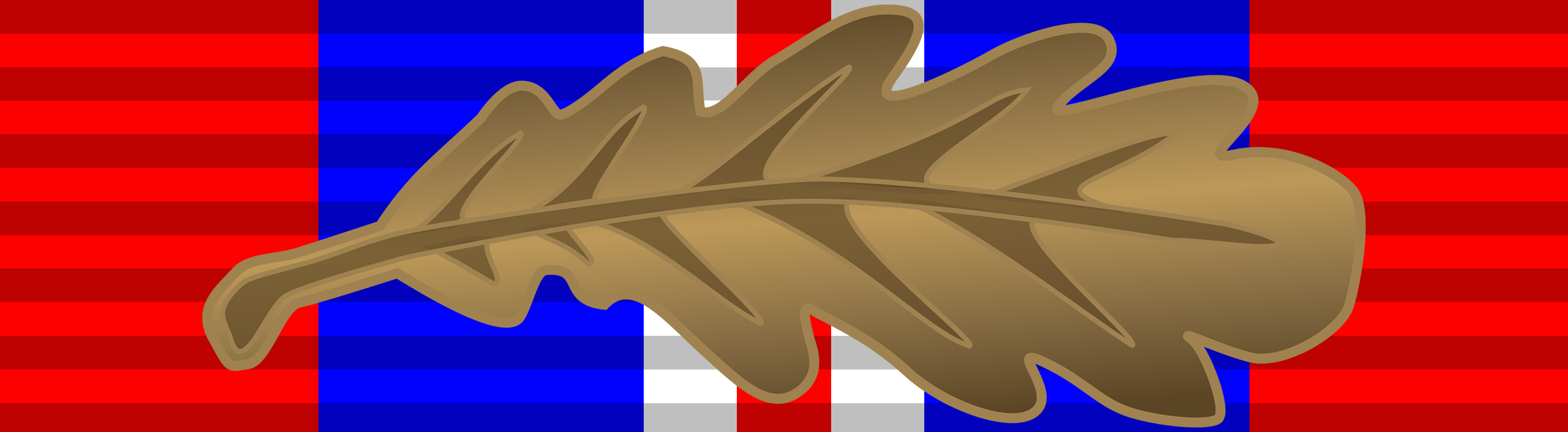

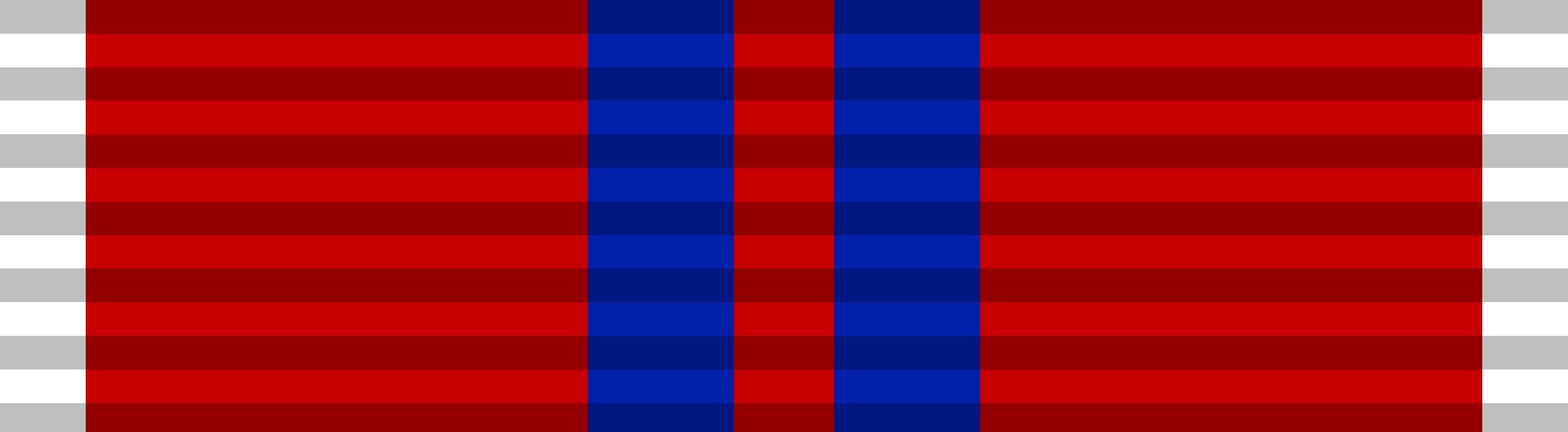

Sitara-i-Pakistan (Star of Pakistan) (SPk)		Sitara-i-Quaid-e-Azam (Star of the Great Leader) (SQA)	Tamgha-e-Jang 1965 War (War Medal 1965)	Pakistan Tamgha (Pakistan Medal) 1947	Tamgha-e-Jamhuria (Republic Commemoration Medal) 1956
1939-1945 Star	Burma Star	Defence Medal	War Medal 1939-1945 (with MiD oak leaf)	Queen Elizabeth II Coronation Medal (1953)	

=== Foreign Decorations ===
Foreign Awards
UK	1939-1945 Star
UK	Burma Star
UK	Defence Medal
UK	War Medal 1939-1945
UK	Queen Elizabeth II Coronation Medal
