= Mithai =

Mithai may refer to:

- Mithai (confectionery), confectionery of the Indian subcontinent
  - Bal Mithai, a brown chocolate-like fudge
  - Khurma (sweet), known in Guyana as simply mithai/meethai
- Mithai (film), a 2019 Telugu dark comedy film
- Mithai (Bengali TV series), a 2021 Bengali television series
- Mithai (Hindi TV series), a 2022 Hindi television series

== See also ==
- Mitha (disambiguation)
