= Wenny Lekardal =

Swedish missionary, nurse and translator

- Born: Gothenburg, Sweden
- Occupation(s): Nurse, missionary, translator
- Years active: 1969–2007
- Awards: Pride of Performance

Ruth Wenny Lekardal is a Swedish missionary known for her contribution to the field of education, social work, and health care in Pakistan. She moved from Sweden to Pakistan in 1960s and spent about thirty-seven years in various cities of Pakistan, including in Punjab. She moved to Sweden in 2007 after retiring from the service at Taxila Christian Hospital.

== Biography ==
She grew up in Ale Municipality. Before moving to Pakistan, she received her nurse training and later began working at Sahlgrenska University Hospital for five years.

She came to Karachi, Pakistan in 1960s, and then started working from Rawalpindi in 1969 for the first seven years. During her stay in the country, she learnt Urdu and Punjabi languages for better communication with the local residents and patients in particular.

Her work was focused on sanitation, providing medical assistance to sanitation workers, immunization to children and pregnant women.

She was later transferred to Swat where she worked in Sahiwal for tuberculosis patients and undernutrition children, in addition to providing maternal health, including pregnant women and child health.

She spent most of her time in Taxila where she served at Taxila Christian Hospital from 1981 to 2007. Her work was focused on education and social work in Taxila.

She moved to Gothenburg, Sweden and Västra Frölunda in 2007 and started working as an Urdu translator.

== Awards ==
In March 2021, the president of Pakistan, Arif Alvi awarded her the Pride of Performance in recognition of her service to Pakistan in the field of health care. She became the first Swedish to receive the Pride of Performance award.
