= Mohammad Rahim Khan =

14th defence secretary of Pakistan

Major General Mohammad Rahim Khan HJ SPk

14th Defence Secretary
- In office November 1980 – December 1981
- President: Muhammad Zia-ul-Haq
- Preceded by: Rasheed ud Din Arshad

Commandant National Defence College
- In office 20 July 1974 – 31 August 1975
- Military career
- Born: Rawalakot, Jammu and Kashmir, British India (now Azad Kashmir, Pakistan)
- Died: 30 September 2020, age 96
- Alma mater: Staff College, Camberley
- Spouse: Kamala Isaac (m. 1945; died 2007)
- Allegiance: Pakistan
- Branch: Pakistan Army
- Rank: Major general
- Unit: 39 Infantry Division
- Commands: Chandpur, East Pakistan
- Conflicts: Indo-Pakistan War of 1971
- Other work: Chairperson of Pakistan International Airlines and Pakistan Civil Aviation Authority

Personal details
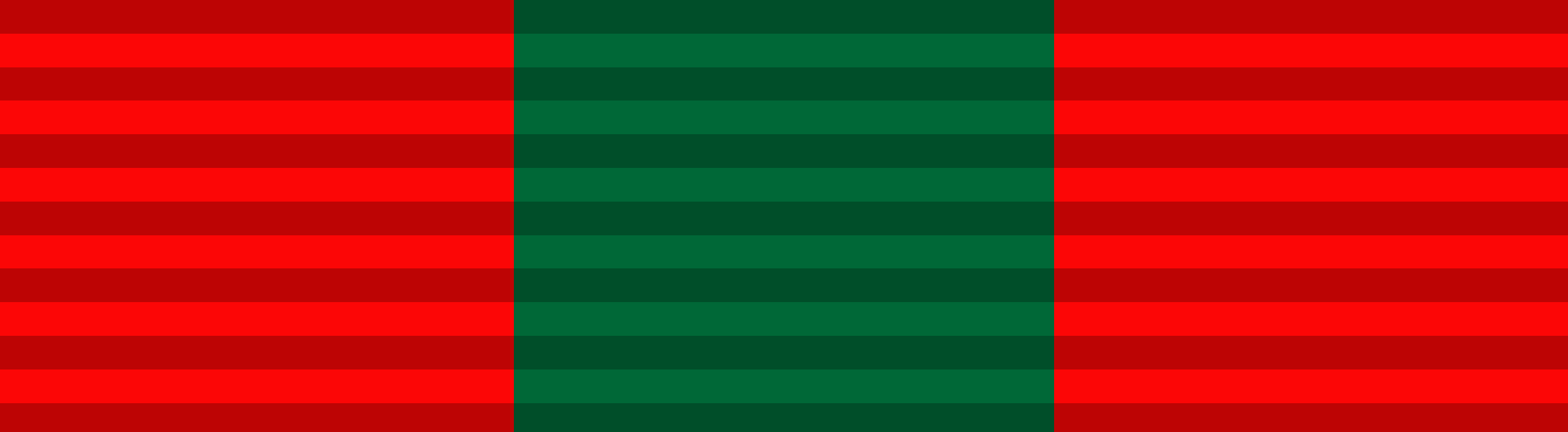
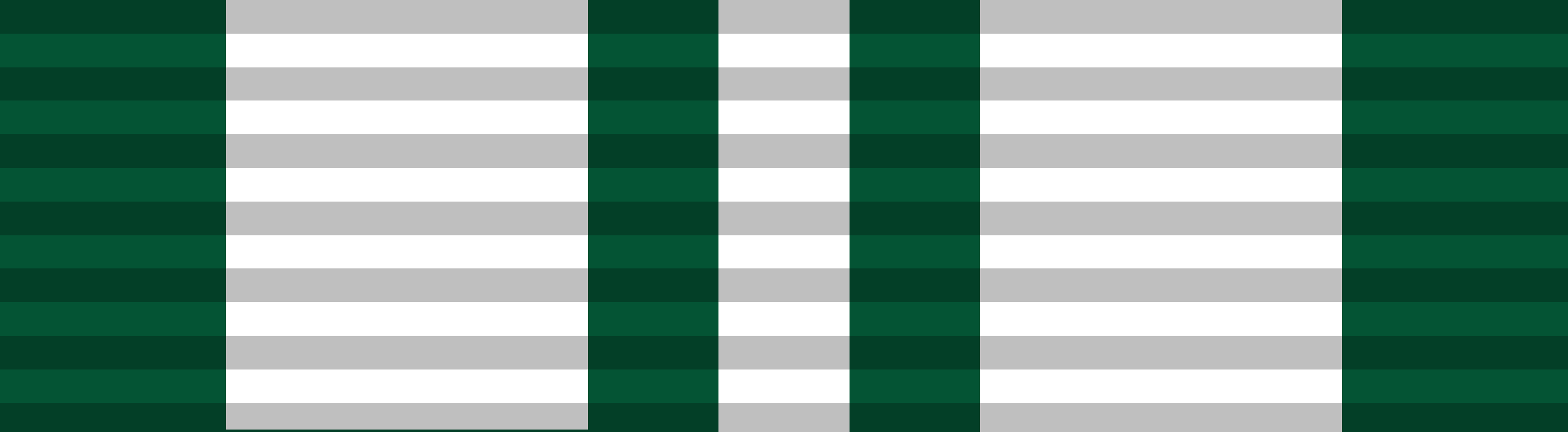
- Awards: Hilal-e-Jurat Sitara-e-Pakistan

Mohammad Rahim Khan HJ was a two star Pakistani military general, diplomat, and later civil servant who served as the 14th defence secretary of Pakistan from November 1980 to December 1981. Before the partition of the Indian subcontinent, he served in the British Indian Army twice in 1943 with the second appointment in 1951. General Rahim also remained CGS of Pakistan Army. He has also served as president of the National Defence College from July 1974 to August 1975.

== Early life and education ==
Khan was born to Qasim Khan who was a farmer and Qasir Bibi in Rawalakot that later became a part of British India. He was the fourth of 10 children in the family. Survived by two siblings, he was married to Kamala Isaac in 1945 who died in 2007. He moved to Rawalpindi where he spent his life. He received his primary education at the government middle school in Rawalakot and later secondary education at Victoria Jubilee high school in Poonch, Pakistan.

== Military career ==
When Pakistan was declared as a sovereign state in 1947, he was sent to the UK by the Pakistan Army where he received his training from the Staff College, Camberley (now defunct). After returning from the UK, he served in the Pakistan Army and then he was promoted to the rank of major general in 1969. During the Indo-Pakistani War of 1971, he commanded an 39 Infantry Division in East Pakistan.

=== Indo-Pakistani War of 1971 ===
Khan was among the other generals accused of Pakistan's defeat in Indo-Pakistani War of 1971. As a general officer commanding of the 39 Infantry Division stationed at Chandpur, East Pakistan, he allegedly left his divisional headquarter on 8 December 1971. He allegedly ordered the officers to move during the day time due to fear of Bangladeshi Forces. His orders caused the death of fourteen naval servicemen, four officers posted at his infantry division, with several others injured, including Khan himself.

He reportedly avoided to alert the general headquarters about the poor performance of communication equipments that caused the Indian troops to carry out the ground attacks. During the war, he left for the West Pakistan and avoided to submit a debriefing to the army headquarters. When he learned about the substandard situation, he went to Dacca, for which he was reportedly criticised by his senior officer, Khadim Hussain Raja.

== Diplomatic career ==
After retiring from the military service and before serving in the civil services, he was appointed as ambassador of Pakistan to Mozambique and then ambassador to Malaysia. During his diplomatic career, he served as chairperson of Pakistan International Airlines and Pakistan Civil Aviation Authority.

== Later work ==
When he retired in 1994, he, along with others established a network of educational institutions for the children. The network was co-supported by the UK NGOs or other schools associated with the network. Later, he and his brother established Kashmir Education Foundation (KEF) for the rural areas children and girls in particular. KEF was later shifted to his house in Rawalpindi. Two KEF institutions were registered under the Global Schools Partnership, operating under the British Council programme.

== Awards and decorations ==
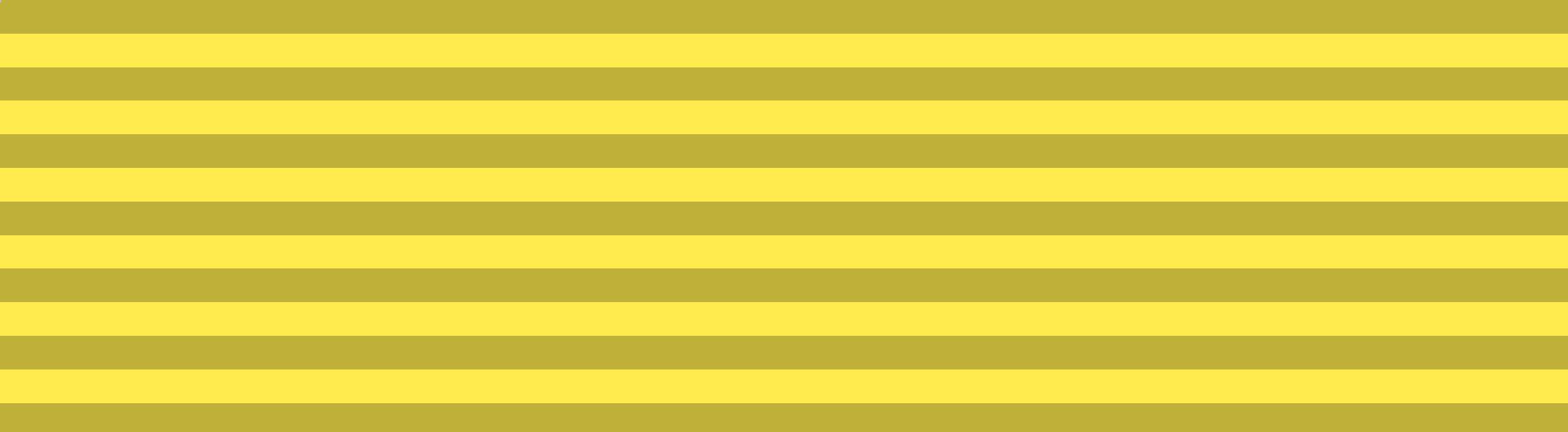

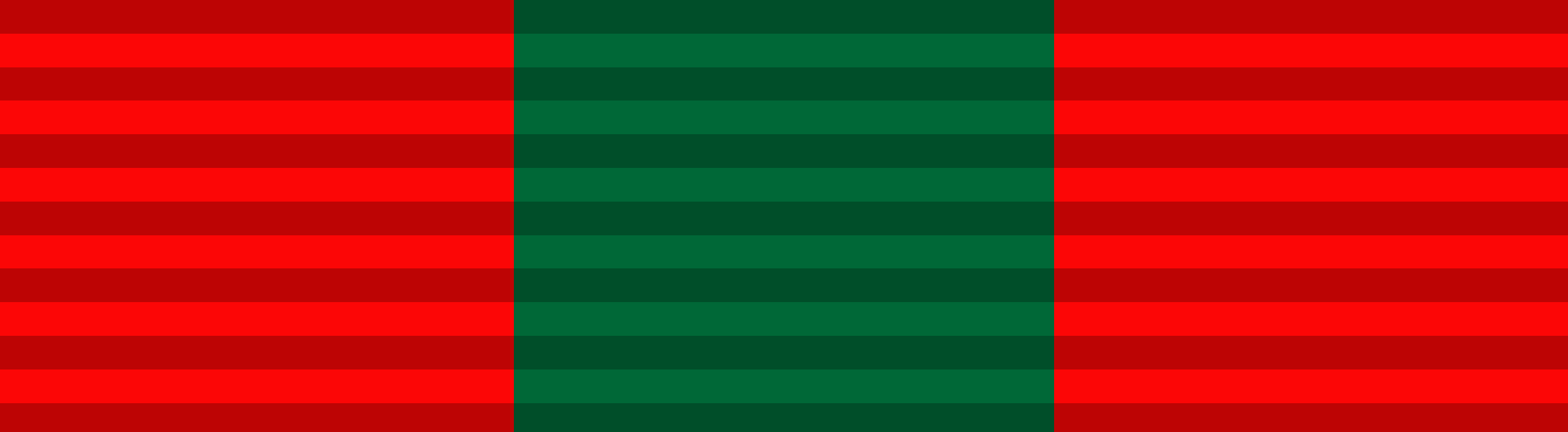

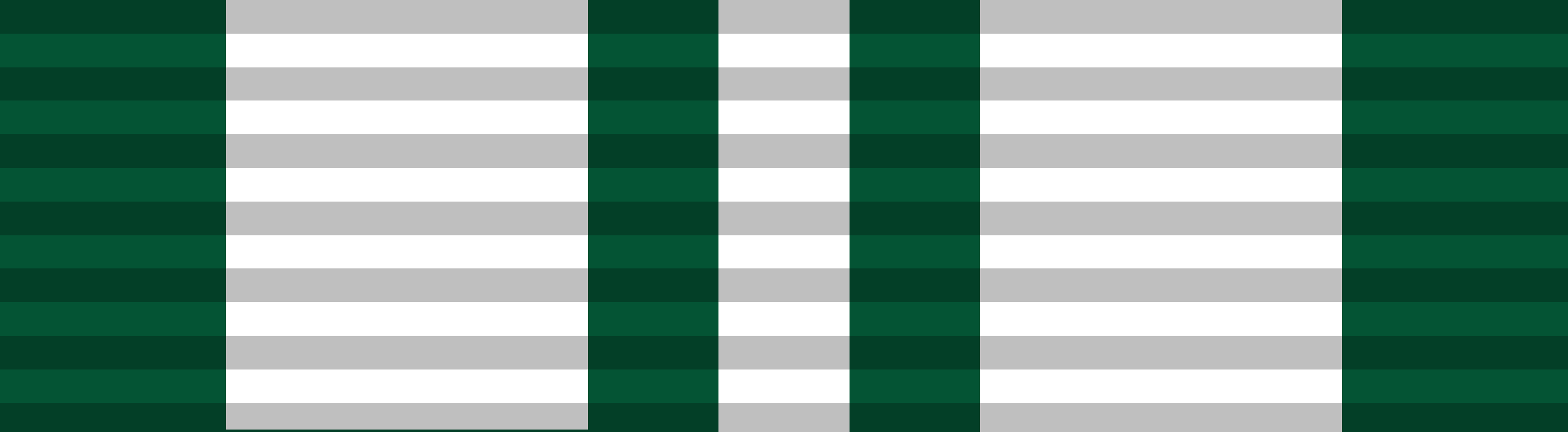

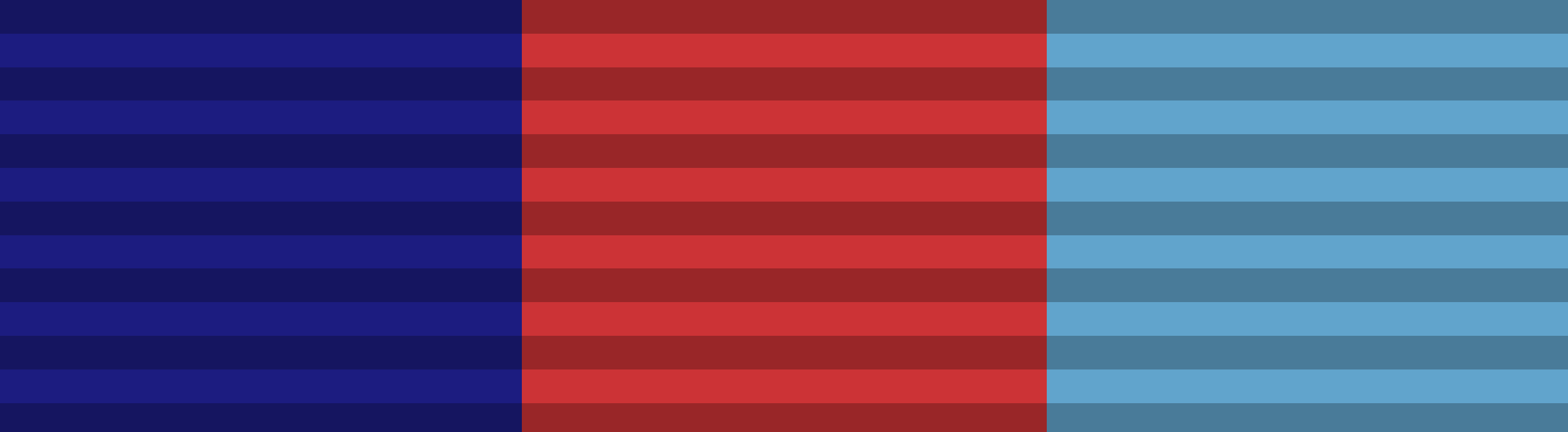

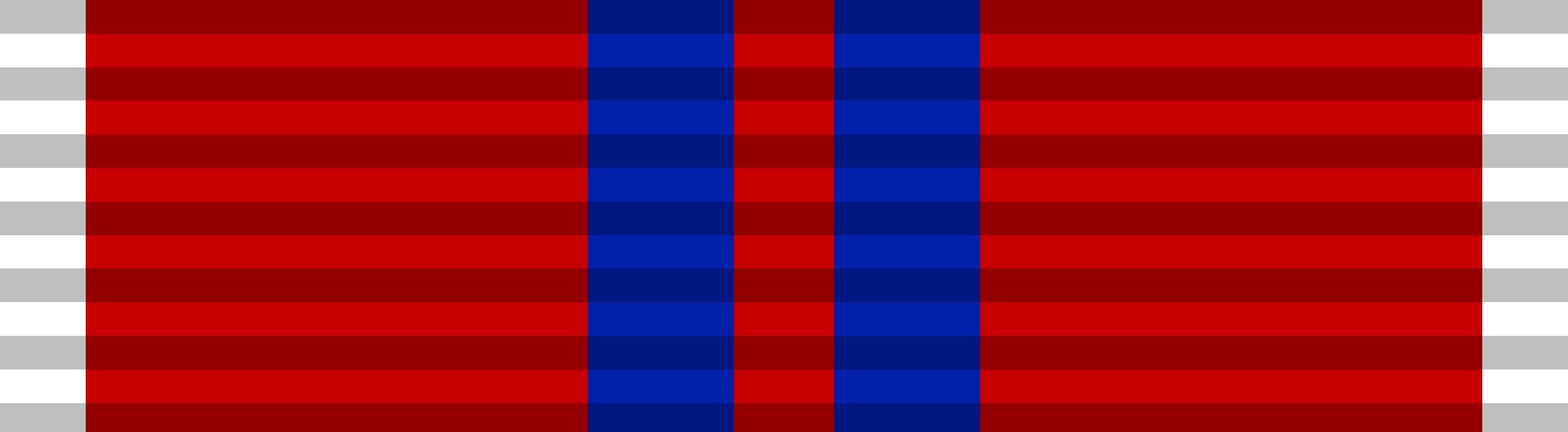

	Gold Wound Stripe		
	Hilal-e-Jurat (Crescent of Courage) 1971 War	Sitara-e-Pakistan (Star of Pakistan) (SPk)	
Tamgha-e-Diffa (General Service Medal): 1. 1965 War Clasp; 2. 1971 War Clasp	Sitara-e-Harb 1965 War (War Star 1965)	Sitara-e-Harb 1971 War (War Star 1971)	Tamgha-e-Jang 1965 War (War Medal 1965)
Tamgha-e-Jang 1971 War (War Medal 1971)	Pakistan Tamgha (Pakistan Medal) 1947	Tamgha-e-Jamhuria (Republic Commemoration Medal) 1956	1939-1945 Star
Burma Star	War Medal 1939-1945	India Service Medal 1939–1945	Queen Elizabeth II Coronation Medal (1953)

=== Foreign Decorations ===
Foreign Awards
UK	1939-1945 Star
UK	Burma Star
UK	War Medal 1939-1945
UK	India Service Medal 1939–1945
UK	Queen Elizabeth II Coronation Medal
