= Aboobaker Osman Mitha =

Pakistani general (1923–1999)

Aboobaker Osman Mitha HJ SQA TPk
- ابوبکر عثمان متہ
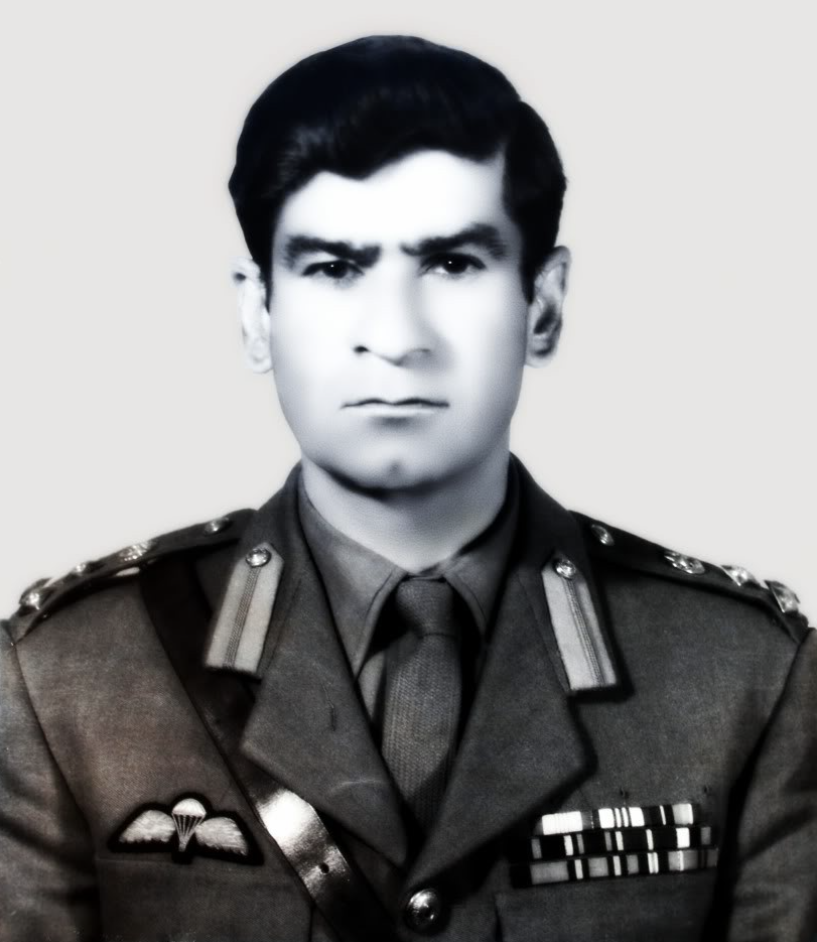
- Official military portrait c. 1971
- Born: 1 June 1923; Bombay, British India
- Died: December 1, 1999 (aged 76); Islamabad, Pakistan
- Spouse: Indu Mitha
- Children: Tehreema Mitha
- Military career
- Allegiance: (British Raj) British India; Pakistan
- Branch: (British Raj) British Indian Army (1942–1947); Pakistan Army (1947–1971)
- Service years: 1942–1971
- Rank: Major General
- Nickname: Father of the SSG
- Unit: Parachute Regiment
- Commands: Special Services Group; Quartermaster General GHQ; Pakistan Military Academy
- Conflicts: World War II; Burma Campaign; Indo-Pakistani War of 1965; Bangladesh Liberation War; Operation Searchlight; Indo-Pakistani War of 1971; 1971 Pakistan Military Officers' Revolt
- Awards: Hilal-i-Jurat; Sitara-i-Quaid-e-Azam

Aboobaker Osman Mitha HJ SQA TPk (1 June 1923 – 1 December 1999), popularized as A. O. Mitha, was a Pakistani general and special forces operative who was one of the founders of Special Services Group (SSG). With the help from the US Army Special Forces, he created the special forces unit in Cherat, Khyber Pakhtunkhwa in 1956.

== Early life and education ==
Aboobaker Osman Mitha was born on 1 June 1923 at his family residence in the Malabar Hill neighbourhood of Bombay, British India. He was born into an affluent and wealthy business family belonging to the Memon community. He grew up in a traditional Indian joint family environment, presided over by an imperious grandfather and powerful grandmother. His entire childhood and early youth was spent in tony south Bombay, he attended the elite schools and colleges there and was attended on by a retinue of servants.

== Military career ==
=== British Indian Army ===
As a young man, Mitha rejected both a career in business and the bride chosen for him by his grandfather, deciding instead to embark upon a career in the army. After finishing high school he joined a pre-cadet academy, and was selected for a commission in the British Indian Army. He passed out of the Indian Military Academy, Dehradun, on 21 June 1942. He was granted an emergency commission in the Indian Army and appointed to the 2nd battalion 4th Bombay Grenadiers. After volunteering for the Indian Parachute Regiment, he served in Burma during World War II and was dropped behind Japanese lines for high-risk operations. He was promoted war substantive Lieutenant 21 December 1942. He was granted a regular Indian Army commission on 25 May 1946 with an initial commission date of 1 June 1944 and to the rank of Lieutenant from 1 December 1945.

Mitha refers to the blatant racism that British officers practised against their Indian colleagues in his posthumously published book, Unlikely Beginnings. He wrote, "If there were ten officers in a mess, two of them British, they would see to it that they had little, if anything, to do with their Indian counterparts".

=== Pakistan Army ===
When British India divided into the Republic of India and the Dominion of Pakistan in August 1947, Mitha opted for Pakistan. He qualified for the Staff College, Quetta and served as General Staff Officer - 1 (GSO 1) in GHQ Pakistan. He describes the GHQ in Rawalpindi of the early days of Pakistan in graphic detail, with junior officers using wooden packing cases for desks and chairs and bringing their own pencils to work. Toilet paper, called "bog paper" by the British, was used to write on, as ordinary paper was just not available.

Lt Col (later Maj Gen) Aboobaker Osman Mitha held several important positions as an army officer. He was extremely hands on and leading from the front type of an officer. This made him a legend not only in the Army, but also with the Navy and Air Force.

In 1954, Mitha was selected to raise an elite commando unit for Pakistan Army, the Special Service Group (SSG). Cherat, a hill station near Peshawar, was chosen as the highly restricted site where the commandos were to be trained and based. Mitha's sole instruction to his handpicked Pakistani officers was, "Be proud of your poverty." He became a legend within the SSG, a fact attested to by SSG officers who came after he had moved on from the SSG.

He remained head of the SSG for 6 years, from 1954 to 1960. So well-received were his training and personality development skills that in 1966, he was appointed commandant of the Pakistan Military Academy. He left his mark on hundreds of young cadets when he commanded the Pakistan Military Academy from 1966 to 1968. He then commanded the 1 Armoured Division from 1968 to 1970. Then he was moved to East Pakistan.

=== In East Pakistan ===
In 1951, Mitha had married a Bengali Christian girl of Brahmin heritage, and this gave him a connection with East Pakistan. In 1965 he commanded an Infantry Brigade in East Pakistan and was also active there in early 1971 as Deputy Corps Commander. He was particularly active in East Pakistan in the days preceding the military action of 25 March 1971. Other generals were present in Dhaka along with Yahya Khan. They secretly departed on the evening of 25 March 1971, that fateful day after fixing the deadline for the military action. Mitha is said to have remained behind. Lt Gen Tikka Khan, Maj Gen Rao Farman Ali and Maj Gen Khadim Hussain Raja were associated with the planning of the military action. Eventually their action bloodied the capital city Dhaka with the blood of thousands of residents including students, military and police personnel, politician and the general mass. Later documents regarding their action on the early hours of 26 March 1971 known as Operation Searchlight was revealed to the world.

=== Betrayal by Lt Gen Gul Hassan ===
Mitha was Quartermaster General at the GHQ when he was prematurely retired by the civilian Chief Martial Law Administrator, Zulfikar Ali Bhutto, in December 1971. He was around 48 years old at the time. Lt General Gul Hasan added Mitha's name to a list of officers whose retirements were announced by Zulfikar Ali Bhutto in his first speech as president on 20 December 1971, four days after the end of the Indo-Pakistani War of 1971. His sacking came as a surprise to Mitha as he had no hand in the Officers' Revolt at Gujranwala or the hooting down of General Abdul Hamid Khan (Chief of Staff) at a GHQ meeting.

According to Mitha, the same Gul Hasan who got him sacked had saved then-Brigadier Muhammad Zia-ul-Haq from being sacked. Brigadier Zia was in Jordan and the year was 1971. Gen Yahya Khan received a signal from Maj Gen Nawazish, the head of the Pakistan military mission in Amman, asking that Zia be court martialled for disobeying GHQ orders by commanding a Jordanian armoured division against the Palestinians, as part of actions in which thousands were killed. That ignominious event is known as Operation Black September. It was Gul Hasan who interceded for Zia and Yahya Khan let Zia off the hook.

=== Honors, dishonors and death ===
In the course of his military career, he was awarded the Hilal-i-Jur'at, Sitara-i-Pakistan, and Sitara-i-Quaid-i-Azam. After retirement he was stripped of his medals and pensions without due cause, and that was quite a surprise to the public as he was never court-martialed. But Mitha gained more popularity by this due to which he was kept under surveillance by the Bhutto Administration as he was also a hero for his juniors in the SSG. He remained under surveillance throughout the Bhutto years.

After being sacked from the Pakistani army, Mitha had a hard time finding any kind of employment. Had it not been for the generosity of a friend living in Britain, who asked Mitha to manage his farm for him in Pakistan, he would have been on the street. Mitha died in December 1999, twenty-eight years into his enforced retirement. Upon his death, one of his friends wrote to his wife:

At the end of a tumultuous life, all he wanted was a room to sleep in, one to write and eat in – a space to walk, reflect and gaze across the fields to the distant hills.

== Personal life ==
While he was serving in the British Indian army (pre-partition), Mitha fell in love with Indu Chatterji, daughter of Prof. Gyanesh C. Chatterji of Lahore Government College. Indu belonged to a Bengali Christian family; they were originally Bengali Brahmins but had converted to Christianity at some point. She had grown up in Lahore, but the family had moved to Delhi at the time of partition. Her family (as also Mitha's) were strongly opposed to the marriage on grounds of culture: there were differences of religion, language, food habits and even other elements of their basic value systems. For instance, Indu was trained in the south Indian classical dance form Bharatanatyam, and after marriage, she had to give up dancing in public, because this was frowned upon in Pakistan, especially when the dancer was the wife of an army officer. Also, Indu had filmi connections - her elder sister Uma Anand was already the wife of Indian (and Hindu) film-maker Chetan Anand, and later in 1954, her cousin Kalpana Kartik, herself an actress, would marry Chetan's brother, the famous Indian hero and heart-throb, Dev Anand. Indu Mitha died on 1 September 2026 in Dublin.

Despite all these very obvious differences, Mitha persisted in a long-distance courtship, and Indu reciprocated. Four years later, in 1951, Indu came to Karachi, against the wishes of her family, and married Mitha. They became the parents of three daughters, two of whom turned out to be very talented classical Bharatanatyam dancers.

== Bibliography ==
- Fallacies & realities : an analysis of Lt. Gen. Gul Hassan's "Memoirs"
- Unlikely beginnings : a soldier's life

== Awards and decorations ==
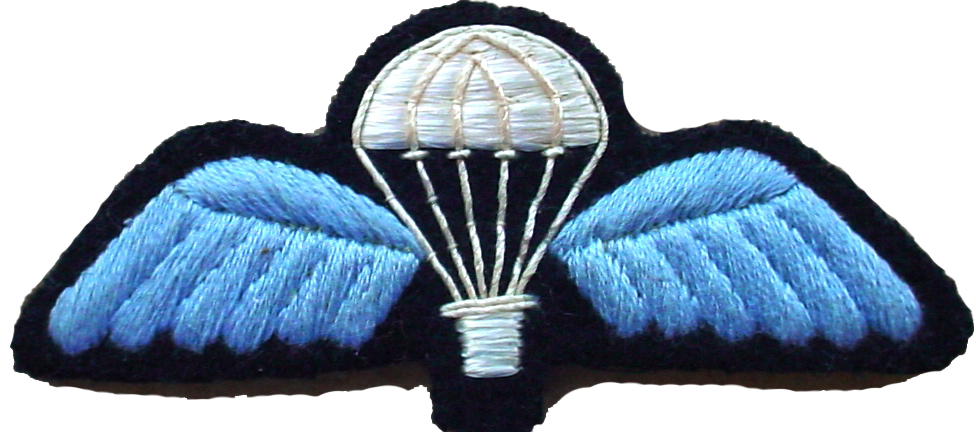

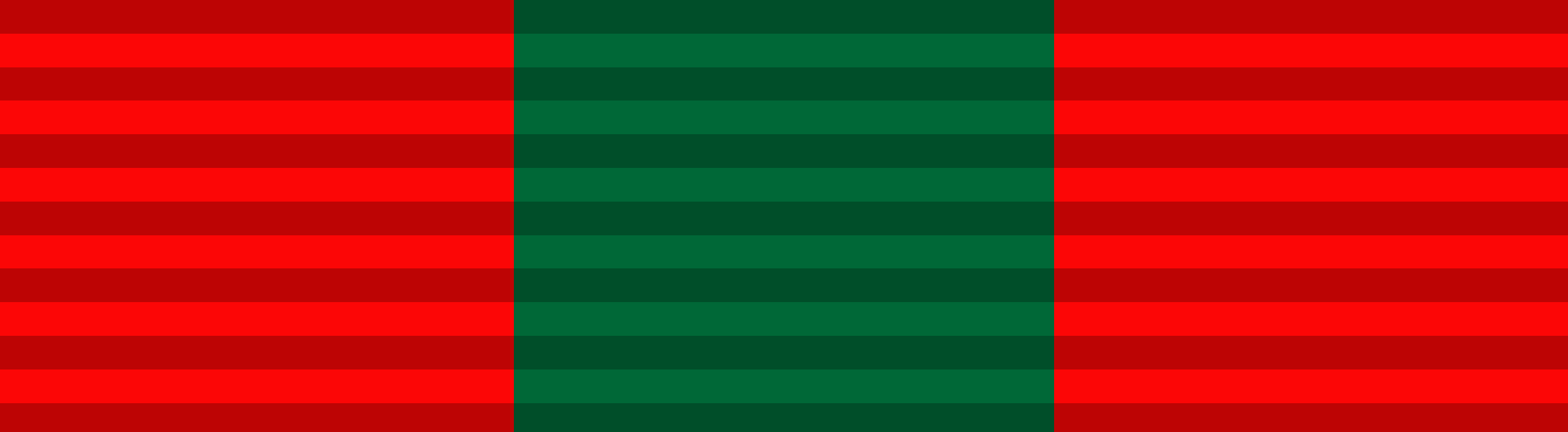

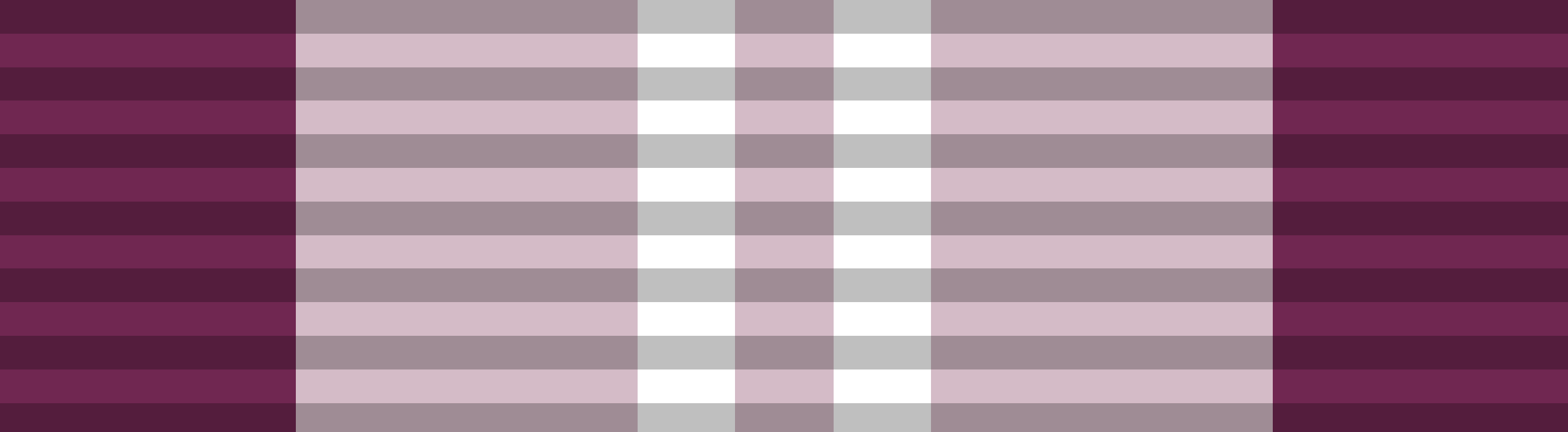

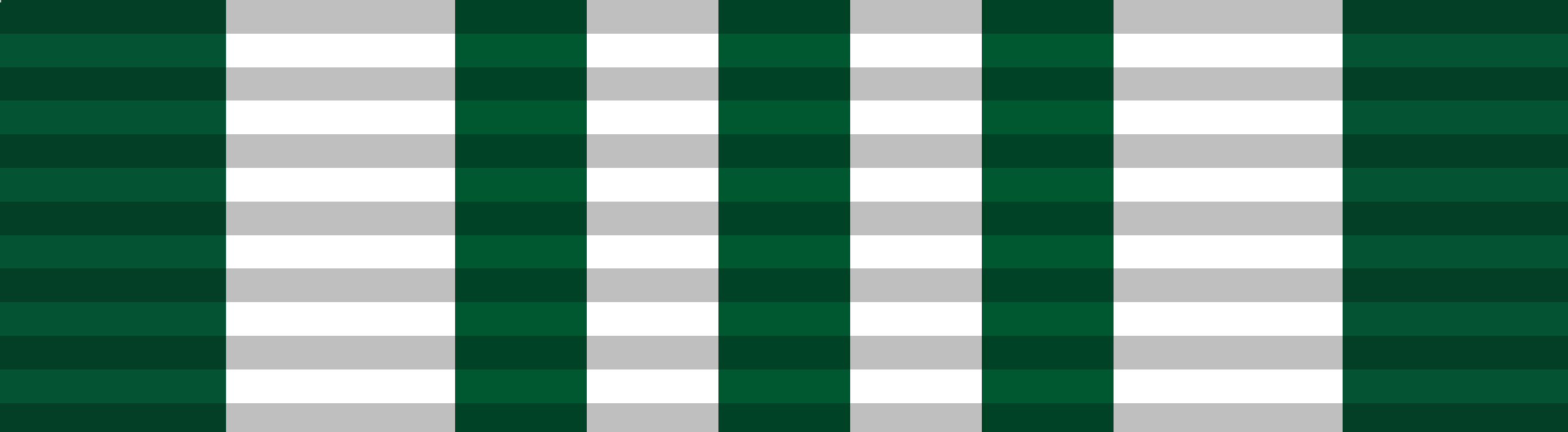

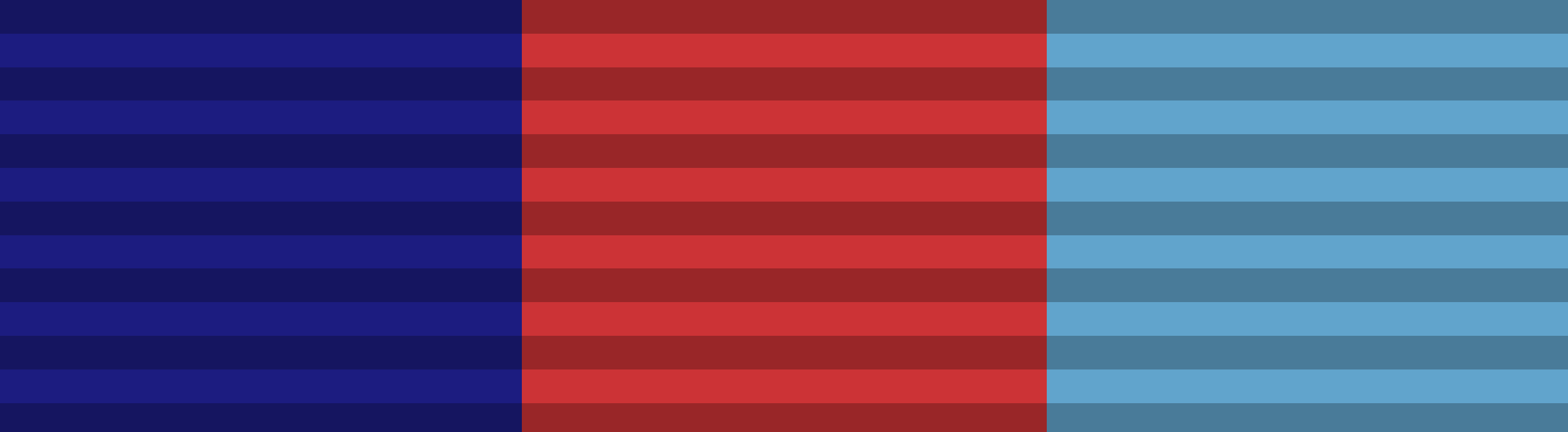

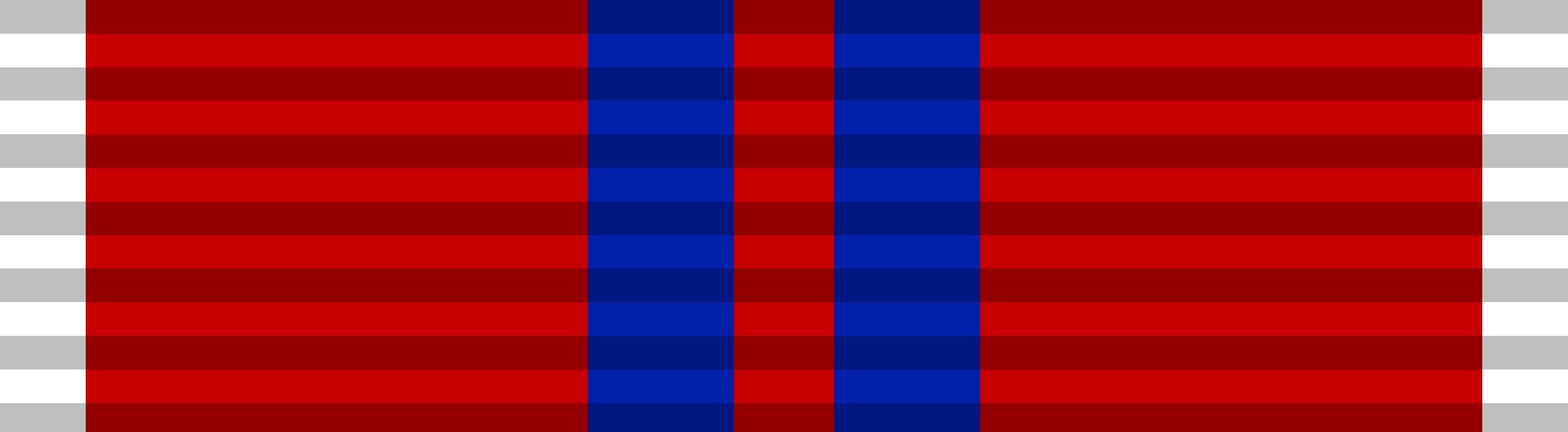

Parachutist Badge
Hilal-i-Jur'at (Crescent of Courage) 1971 War WITHDRAWN	Sitara-e-Quaid-e-Azam (Star of the Great Leader) (SQA)	Tamgha-e-Pakistan (Medal of Pakistan) (TPk)	Tamgha-e-Diffa (Defence Medal) 1965 War Clasp
Sitara-e-Harb 1965 War (War Star 1965)	Tamgha-e-Jang 1965 War (War Medal 1965)	Pakistan Medal (Pakistan Tamgha) 1947	Tamgha-e-Qayam-e-Jamhuria (Republic Commemoration Medal) 1956
1939-1945 Star	Burma Star	War Medal 1939-1945	Queen Elizabeth II Coronation Medal (1953)
