= Khaldunia High School =

Coordinates: 33.67308°N 72.99569°E

- Islamabad; Pakistan

Information
- Type: Private fee-paying school
- Established: 1997
- Grades: Preschool, Primary, Secondary
- Gender: Co-educational
- Campus: Urban
- Affiliation: GCE O-Level
- Website: http://khaldunia.edu.pk/

Khaldunia High School (KHS) is a private fee-paying academic institution located in Islamabad, Pakistan. Khaldunia provides preschool education, primary education, secondary education and preparation for the General Certificate of Education(GCE) O Level examinations.

== History of the school ==
Hajra Ahmed and Farukh Pracha founded Khaldunia High School. Classes commenced in January 1997 beginning with Grades 6 through 9. In September, GCE Ordinary level was launched. In September 1999, primary and elementary classes were introduced followed by preschool classes termed Reception in 2002. The Advisory Committee included Pervez Hoodbhoy, M. A K. Chaudhry, Ibn Abdur Rehman and Vaqar Zaqaria. The word Khaldunia is inspired from Ibn Khaldun, the naming being a brainchild of Eqbal Ahmad. In February 2012, the plan to construct a purpose built campus was approved by the Capital Development Authority (CDA). The land was brought by the school from the CDA on a relatively low cost.

== Events and Facilities ==
The lone campus is located in Plot # 2, St 94, G-11/3 in Islamabad, Pakistan. The school hosts convocations, Annual Sports Days, Arts and Crafts Fairs, and Field Trips. Two science laboratories, a computer laboratory and a library are present in the campus. Students can become members of several clubs and societies and be elected student council. Twice weekly assemblies are conducted by different classes regularly in the morning before classes begin. Guest lecturers are invited to speak to students, among with include notable speakers such as Eqbal Ahmad, Pervez Hoodbhoy, Zia Mian, Abdul Hameed Nayyar, Tariq Rahman, and Zafar Abbas.

== Criticism ==
Khaldunia High School is classified as a high-cost private school. In December 2018, the Supreme Court of Pakistan passed an order that forced such schools to reduce any fees over Rs. 5,000 by 20 per cent. The order was passed on the insistence of protesting parents who stated that private schools were charging 'extortionary' fees, and subjecting them to arbitrary increases.
