= Mitha, Kapurthala =

Mitha
- Village
- Location in Punjab, India Mitha (India)
- Coordinates: 31.289715°N 75.291653°E
- Country: India
- State: Punjab
- District: Kapurthala

Government
  - Type: Panchayati raj (India)
  - Body: Gram panchayat

Population (2011)
  - Total: 209
- Sex ratio 106/103♂/♀

Languages
  - Official: Punjabi
  - Other spoken: Hindi
- Time zone: UTC+5:30 (IST)
- PIN: 144620
- Telephone code: 01822
- ISO 3166 code: IN-PB
- Vehicle registration: PB-09
- Website: kapurthala.gov.in

Mitha is a village in Kapurthala district of Punjab State, India. It is located 16 kilometres (9.9 mi) from Kapurthala, which is both its district and sub-district headquarters. The village is administrated by a Sarpanch who is an elected representative.

== Demography ==
According to the 2011 Census of India, Mitha had 45 houses and a population of 209, of which 106 were males and 103 females. The literacy rate was 71.82%, lower than the state average of 75.84%. The population of children under the age of 6 was 28, being 13.40% of total population, and the child sex ratio was approximately 474, lower than state average of 846.

== Population data ==
Particulars	Total	Male	Female
Total No. of Houses	45	-	-
Population	209	106	103
Child (0-6)	28	19	9
Schedule Caste	44	27	17
Schedule Tribe	0	0	0
Literacy	71.82 %	72.41 %	71.28 %
Total Workers	67	52	15
Main Worker	67	0	0
Marginal Worker	0	0	0

== Air travel connectivity ==
The closest airport to the village is Sri Guru Ram Dass Jee International Airport.
