= Indu Mitha =

Pakistani dancer and choreographer (1929–2026)

- اندو مٹھا
- Born: Indu Chatterjee; 28 July 1929; Lahore, Punjab, British India
- Died: 31 August 2026 (aged 97); Dublin, Ireland
- Spouse: Aboobaker Osman Mitha
- Children: Tehreema Mitha
- Parent: Gyanesh Chandra Chatterjee
- Relatives: Uma Anand (sister)

Indu Mitha (née Chatterjee; 28 July 1929 – 31 August 2026) was a Pakistani dancer and choreographer who was an exponent of Bharatnatyam, and one of only two in the nation (the other being Sheema Kirmani) at the time of her death. She also remained a faculty member at the Rawalpindi campus of the National College of the Arts after retirement.

== Early life ==
Indu Chatterjee was born in Lahore, Pakistan in 1930, into a Bengali Christian family of Brahmin heritage that had converted to Christianity. She studied MA philosophy from Delhi University in 1951. Her father, Gyanesh Chandra Chatterjee, was a professor of philosophy and president of the Government College in Lahore, which was where Mitha grew up. Her elder sister Uma Anand married famous Bollywood director Chetan Anand. Her family moved to Delhi from Lahore during the Partition of India. In Delhi, she learned Bharatanatyam from Vijay Raghava Rao and Shrimati Lalita. Mitha learnt modern expressional dance from the iconic choreographer and actress Zohra Sehgal. After Independence, Mitha continued her dance training at Sangeet Bharat School and then later from S.V.Lalita.

== Career ==
In the years following her husband's retirement, Mitha began teaching Bharatnatyam in Lahore. Her first position was at the Lahore Grammar school, where she became a celebrated dance teacher. Her students and she were even able to put on a full-on performance at the end of her first teaching sojourn.

Her early performances were at private all-women parties, military functions, Red Cross charity shows or in front of the All Pakistan Women's Association. She later did one show a year for private audiences, mostly all-women groups, due to the atmosphere linked to the increasing Islamization in Pakistan.

Mitha ran an academy/school "Mazmoon e Shauq" to teach classical dance where she taught many students like Amna Mawaz Khan.

== Adaptations ==
To suit Pakistani cultural and religious norms, Mitha altered the performance and style of the Bharatnatyam she taught. She composed Bharatnatyam songs in Urdu, due to her lack of understanding of Tamil, Telugu or Sanskrit, the three languages Bharatnatyam songs are traditionally composed in.

== Personal life and death ==
In 1951, she married Captain Aboobaker Osman Mitha, a Mumbai Memon against the wishes of her family, and moved back to Pakistan with him. Their daughter, Tehreema Mitha is an accomplished Bharatnatyam dancer.

Mitha died on 31 August 2026.

== Awards ==
Mitha received President's Award for Pride of Performance Awards (2020–2029) in August 2020.

== Notes ==
- Tikekar, Monisha (2004). Across the Wagah: an Indian's sojourn in Pakistan. New Delhi: Promilla & Co. in association with Bibliophile South Asia.
