= 6th Armoured Division (Pakistan) =

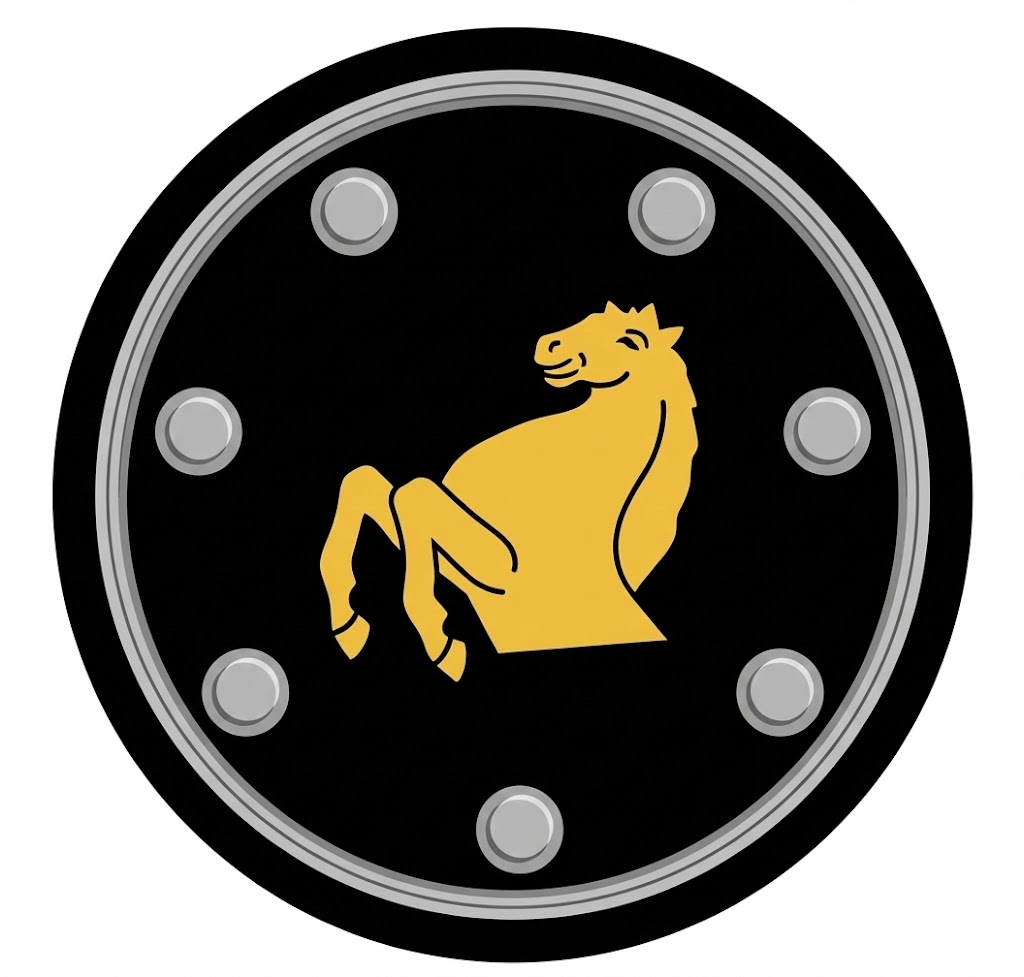
- 6 Armoured Division Insignia
- Active: 14 April 1964- Present
- Country: Pakistan
- Branch: Pakistan Army
- Type: Armoured Division
- Role: Striking Offensive
- Size: 15,000 men approximately (though this may vary as units are rotated)
- Part of: I Strike Corps
- Headquarters: Gujranwala, Punjab Province
- Nicknames: Shahsawar, Men of Steel
- Colors: Black and Gold
- Equipment: Armour: VT-4/Haider; Artillery: M109A2; Mechanised: VCC-1; VCC-2; Sakb; M113; Engineering: Type 79A ribbon bridge; Indigenous assault trackway; Indigenous Troll Anti-Mine (TAM) vehicle; Indigenous M47-based AVLB; Indigenous Al-Khalid-based AVLB; AM 50; Indigenous mine dispensing system; Indigenous rocket delivery mine system; Air defence: Giraffe radar; APC-mounted RBS 70
- Engagements: Indo-Pakistani War of 1965; Indo-Pakistani War of 1971

Commanders
- General Officer Commanding: Maj. Gen. Abu bakr Sheraz

- Colonel Staff: Brig. N/A
- Notable commanders: (Then Brigadier) General Zia-ul-Haq; Lt. Gen Gul Hassan Khan; Lt. Gen Mian Muhammad Afzaal HI(M) SI(M) OA(M) SBt (Shaheed) (Then Maj. Gen & Later CGS); Lt. Gen Zarrar Azim HI(M) (Then Maj. Gen); Lt. Gen Fazle Haq(Then Maj. Gen); Lt. Gen Shah Rafi Alam SJ (Then Maj. Gen); Maj. Gen Abrar Husain; Maj. Gen M. I. Karim; Maj. Gen Iftikhar Janjua; Maj. Gen S Wajahat Hussain; Maj. Gen Jamshed Malik (Late) Maj. Gen Muhammad Ali Khan

The 6th Armoured Division is a Pakistan Army armoured division currently based in Gujranwala, in Punjab Province.

== History ==
=== Formation ===
The division was originally an armoured brigade known as the 100 Independent Armoured Brigade Group. In 1964, it was decided to use the headquarters and other assets of this formation to create a new armoured division. It was still in the process of raising when the 1965 war against India broke out.

=== 1965 War ===
The formation would see its first taste of action in Operation Grand Slam in Chamb sector where it was the armoured contingent. However the general weakness of Pakistan Army defence around Sialkot and the fact that war was expected to break out over the international border, meant that the division would see only a few days of fighting before it was sent to Sialkot, where it would earn its spurs at a village called Chawinda. On 8 September the Indian attack came and thus began the Battle of Chawinda. Initially the division was surprised and outflanked by the Indians who chose an unexpected axis to attack. Desperate holding actions by some individual units, famously, the 25th Cavalry (of the 15th Infantry Division), would hamper the Indian advance. A battle ensued against the Indians at Phillora (Phillaurah) resulting in a loss of 66 tanks. The 6th Armoured Division then settled in defensive positions around Chawinda alongside other divisions, withstood multiple brigade-sized attacks by elements of the Indian I Corps, until the biggest on 18 September when the Indian 1st Armoured and 6th Mountain divisions launched a combined assault, but was ultimately repulsed, thanks largely to the accurate fire assaults conducted by superior Pakistani artillery.

The divisions' action at Chawinda remains its most famous action. This battle was the largest tank battle since Kursk in 1943 and has been forever associated with the 6th. Amongst the many commendations received was one by the President which read:

The President of Pakistan has commanded that his personal congratulations be conveyed to All Ranks under your command for the exemplary, successful and courageous battle that they have fought. The President and the whole Nation are proud of these untarnishable deeds of valour.

== Present order of battle ==
The division is at present stationed in Gujranwala and has four armoured brigades attached.

- HQ 6 Armoured Division, Gujranwala
  - 7th Armoured Brigade, Gujranwala
  - 9th Armoured Brigade(Asad-e-Ilahi), Gujranawala
  - 11th Armoured Brigade, Gujranwala
  - 8th Armoured Brigade Group, Mangla (wartime only, normally under corps control)
  - 106 Air Defence Brigade

One of the regiments of the division is reportedly the 29th Cavalry. In addition the following units are attached and stationed in Kharain.

- 6 Armoured Division Support troops (a brigades worth of troops, mostly engineers, signal and other logistic troops)
  - 313 Assault Engineers battalion
  - 314 Assault Engineers battalion
- 6 Armoured Division Artillery (Equivalent to a Brigade)
- 6 Armoured Div Aviation Air Brigade (wartime only, ordinarily units are dispersed)
