= Gul Hassan Khan =

Pakistani general (1921-99)

Gul Hassan SPk SQA
- گل حسن
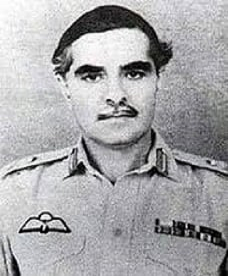
- Khan as a Major General, c. 1965

6th Commander-in-Chief Pakistan Army
- In office (acting); 20 December 1971 – 21 January 1972
- President: Zulfikar Ali Bhutto
- Preceded by: Yahya Khan
- In office 22 January 1972 – 3 March 1972
- Succeeded by: Tikka Khan (as Chief of Army Staff)

Ambassador of Pakistan to Greece
- In office April 1975 – 14 April 1977
- Preceded by: Office Established
- Succeeded by: S. Wajahat Hussain

Ambassador of Pakistan to Austria
- In office 26 May 1972 – April 1975
- Preceded by: Enver Murad
- Succeeded by: Abdul Sattar

10th Chief of General Staff Pakistan Army
- In office 20 December 1968 – 19 December 1971
- Preceded by: Sahabzada Yaqub Khan
- Succeeded by: M. Rahim Khan

Directing Staff Staff College, Quetta
- In office 30 June 1957 – 16 June 1959

Personal details
- Born: Gul Hassan Khan; 9 June 1921 Quetta, Baluchistan (Chief Commissioner's Province)
- Died: 10 October 1999 (aged 78) Rawalpindi, Pakistan
- Resting place: Pabbi, North-West Frontier Province, Pakistan
- Children: 1
- Education: Prince of Wales Royal Indian Military College; Indian Military Academy; Staff College, Quetta; United States Army Armor School

Military service
- Branch/service: British Indian Army (1942–1947); Pakistan Army (1947–1972)
- Years of service: 1942–1972
- Rank: Lieutenant General
- Unit: Pakistan Army Armoured Corps
- Commands: Pakistan Army; Chief of General Staff; 100 Independent Armoured Brigade Group
- Battles/wars: World War II; Burma Campaign; Battle of Kohima; Indo-Pakistani War of 1947; Indo-Pakistani war of 1965; Indo-Pakistani war of 1971
- Awards: See list
- Service number: PA-457

Gul Hassan Khan (Note: Urdu: گل حسن خان) (9 June 1921 – 10 October 1999) also known as George, (Note: Gul Hassan was secretly referred to as 'George by his colleagues.) was a Pakistani three-star rank general and diplomat who served as the sixth and last Commander-in-Chief of the Pakistan Army, from 20 December 1971 until 3 March 1972, marking the shortest tenure in the role. He was forced to resign along with Air Marshal Abdur Rahim Khan for refusing President Zulfikar Ali Bhutto's orders to deploy their forces to suppress a police strike protesting against the government for a pay increase.

Throughout his career, he held the positions of Aide-de-camp to Cameron Nicholson, General Viscount Slim, and Muhammad Ali Jinnah, Directing Staff Staff College, Quetta, Commander 1 Armoured Division, Chief of General Staff, Director Military Operations, and Commander 100 Independent Armoured Brigade Group.

== Early life ==
Gul Hassan Khan was born in Quetta into a middle-class Pashtun family on 9 June 1921. His father was the Superintendent of the Government Railway Police. Gul Hassan had three brothers and a sister, of which he was the second oldest. He has relatives still residing in Pabbi Nowshera District and in Quetta.

Gul Hassan survived both the 1930 earthquake in Balochistan and the devastating 1935 Quetta earthquake. In 1939, he joined the Prince of Wales Royal Indian Military College (PWRIMC) and was described as an "usually quite Pathan" and the smartest cadet. In March 1940, he appeared for the competitive entrance examination into the Indian Military Academy (IMA) at Dehra Dun but failed, not because of his academics, but because he was late to his interview which was worth 500 marks on the exam.

In January 1941, he took the exam again and received admission into the IMA, where he would become known as an "excellent" Hockey player and gained fame as a boxer.

== Personal life ==
Gul Hassan was fluent in Urdu, Pashto, Punjabi, English, and Persian. He was married to a Greek woman and had one son, Sher Hassan Khan, born in 1982. When his wife came from Vienna to see him in the hospital in the days leading up to his death, he had given her Rs1.1 million rupees and his son a similar amount. The last Rs100,000 rupees he had left, he instructed his family to use for his funeral.

On one occasion while training officers, he wanted the artillery practice to mimic real war conditions. He had a bunker built at the target end of the Muzaffargarh range, which offered some security but was not completely safe, as a direct hit could destroy it. Despite the risk, Gul Hassan entered the bunker himself and instructed the gunners to fire with a narrow margin of error to test their training. He insisted that each artillery regiment take turns firing at the bunker to assess their skills. (Retd) Colonel EAS Bokhari wrote: "Luckily the units fired perfectly - and though Gen Gul was shaken in the bunker and came out of it with a lot of dust and fear of God in him - but he was quite safe. I have never seen any General Officer do this and ask for fire on a target where he himself was located."

(Retd) Colonel Abdul Qayyum recalled that Gul Hassan was "short on strategic vision," "but he was a field commander par excellence - by our standards, at any rate. He almost equaled Patton in linguistic matters, but he was our version of Robert E. Lee in the field. Gul Hassan was warm, sincere, forthright, without a trace of cant or deceit, wholly committed to his command, bold and generous of spirit."

== Military career ==
=== British Indian Army ===
He was commissioned as a second lieutenant in the British Indian Army on 22 February 1942 into the 9th battalion of the Frontier Force Rifles and was later transferred to the Armoured Corps.

He attended an Intelligence course in March 1943 at Karachi where his commandant was Lieutenant Colonel J Campbell.

==== World War II ====
Gul Hassan was stationed in Assam with Assam Rifles and participated in the Burma Campaign 1944–45. In his memoirs, Hassan recalled the stench of the dead bodies of Japanese soldiers and that he witnessed the British Indian Army burn bodies of the Japanese.

Near the end of the war, he was appointed as the aide-de-camp to General Viscount Slim who commanded the 14th Army in Burma.

=== Pakistan Army ===
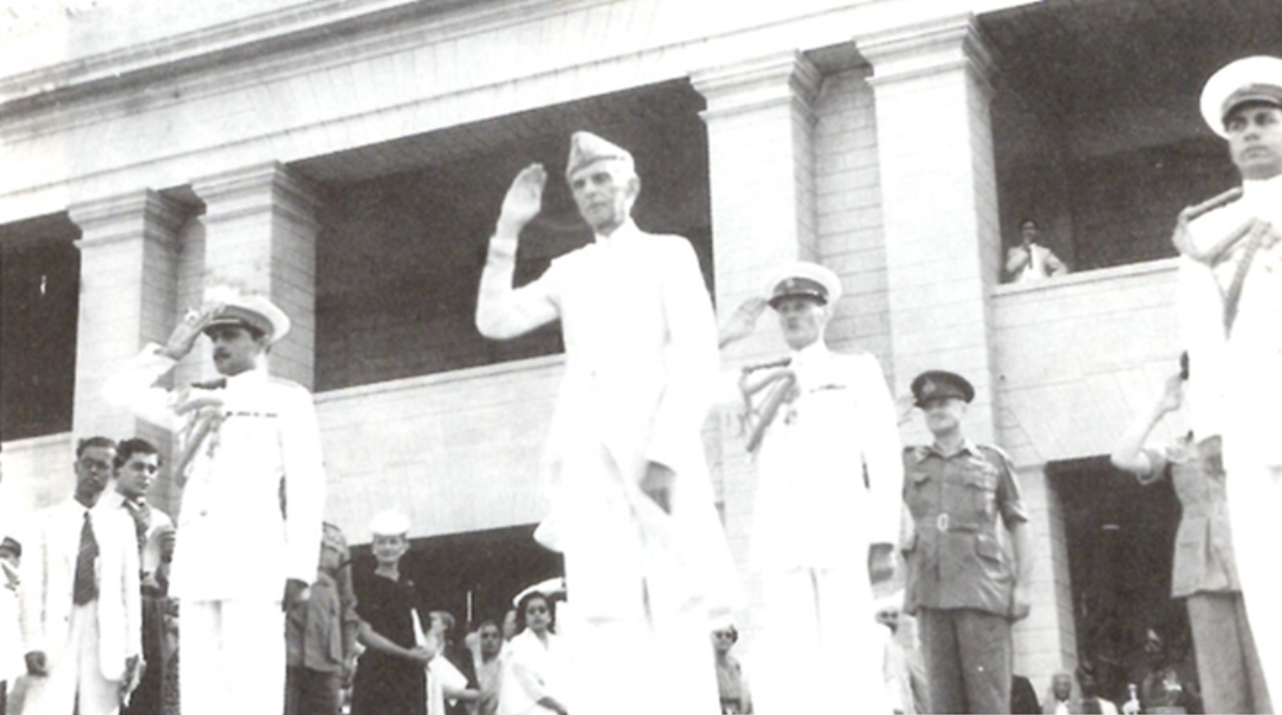
ADC Gul Hassan (left) saluting alongside Governor-General Muhammad Ali Jinnah (1947)

After the Partition of British India in August 1947, Captain Gul Hassan opted for Pakistan and served as the aide-de-camp (ADC) to Muhammad Ali Jinnah.

In 1950, Gul Hassan attended the Staff College, Quetta. In September 1951, he was posted to the Military Training Directorate at the General Headquarters under director Brigadier Jerrad.

He served as the Directing Staff at Staff College, Quetta from 30 June 1957 to 16 June 1959.

At the outbreak of the Indo-Pakistani War of 1965, Brigadier Gul Hassan was the Director of Military Operations in the GHQ. For his service in the war, Hassan was awarded the Sitara-e-Pakistan by President Ayub Khan. He was later promoted to major general and appointed General Officer Commanding of the 1st Armoured Division headquartered in Multan. In September 1968, he was appointed as Colonel Commandant of the Pakistan Army Corps of Engineers.

On 20 December 1968, Major General Gul Hassan was appointed as Chief of General Staff. He was promoted to Lieutenant General while serving in this post in 1971. He was the Director of Exercise for an event aimed at assessing the technical skills and professional capabilities of various participating Pakistan Army units. Air Marshal Abdur Rahim Khan and President Yahya Khan arrived to observe the maneuvers on 30 January 1971 near Multan.

==== Role in saving Zia-ul-Haq's career ====
According to A.O. Mitha, it was Gul Hassan's lobbying at the GHQ which saved then Brigadier Zia-ul-Haq, the chief of Pakistan's military mission, from being dismissed from service. Brigadier Zia-ul-Haq, who was deployed to Jordan in 1971, was recommended to be court-martialed by Major General Nawazish to President Yahya Khan for disobeying GHQ orders by commanding a Jordanian armoured division against the Palestinians, as part of "Operation Black September" in which thousands were killed. It was Gul Hassan who interceded for Zia ultimately leading to Yahya Khan letting Zia off the hook.

According to several sources, Gul Hassan was unaware of Operation Searchlight and had a strong dislike for General A. A. K. Niazi. In a conversation with President Yahya Khan, Gul Hassan was informed about Niazi's promotion and his own. Yahya Khan asked, "When did you see General Abdul Hamid Khan [the Chief of Staff] last?" Gul Hassan replied, "I just came from his office."

Yahya continued, "Didn't he tell you that you have been promoted?" Gul Hassan, puzzled, responded, "No, Sir. Where am I going?"

Yahya clarified, "Nowhere." Confused, Gul Hassan questioned, "Then why should I be promoted?" Yahya explained, "Because we are promoting Niazi who is junior to you. So we have had to give you the next rank."

Gul Hassan further inquired, "Where is Niazi going?" Yahya replied, "As commander Eastern Command."

In frustration, Gul Hassan uttered an expletive. In response, President Yahya Khan remarked to Sultan Khan who was also present, "This is what he (Gul) thinks of my senior officers." Gul Hassan had assessed Niazi as having a professional ceiling no more than that of a company commander.

General Abdul Hamid Khan, as Chief of Staff, was the de facto Commander-in-Chief as Yahya Khan was usually drunk. According to Gul Hassan, Abdul Hamid failed to fulfill his responsibilities in either role. Hassan wrote that Abdul Hamid had the authority but avoided taking responsibility and withheld crucial information from the GHQ, leaving them unaware of diplomatic developments and military plans. Gul Hassan adds that despite General A. A. K. Niazi's incompetence, Abdul Hamid supported him, worsening the situation. Gul Hassan stated that by September 1971, it seemed inevitable that India would intervene in East Pakistan and Yahya Khan attempted to seek help from the United States but received no response. Yahya Khan also reached out to China and they told him to find a political solution. Gul Hassan went on to say that Yahya was praying that Pakistan would be rescued by angels. Gul Hassan recalled that A. A. K. Niazi, oblivious to the reality, did not anticipate an Indian invasion and falsely reported normalcy in East Pakistan.

Despite warnings, Abdul Hamid failed to convey critical assessments to Yahya, who remained detached from the situation, "foolishly" declining a request for an urgent briefing by Gul Hassan. The army faced a dire disadvantage against India and rebels, with Yahya's leadership lacking direction. After the war, Yahya blamed the loss of East Pakistan on "the treachery of Indians", while Gul Hassan attributed the loss to Pakistan's "own blunders."

==== Role in Yahya Khan's removal ====
On 17 December 1971, Brigadier F.B. Ali wrote his resignation letter accepting his own responsibility for the loss of East Pakistan and expected that President Yahya Khan and his advisors would follow suit and also resign. But the next day Ali had heard that Yahya was planning to create a new Constitution which infuriated Ali. Brigadier Ali determined that the loss of one war was enough and that it was imperative to get rid of the military junta of Yahya Khan. He picked up Brigadier Iqbal Mehdi Shah, Colonel Aleem Afridi, Colonel Agha Javed Iqbal, Lt Col Khursheed, and other officers and told them that they owed it to Pakistan to get rid of the discredited junta and hand over power to the elected civilian representatives.

All officers present, agreed. However, there was a problem as Maj Gen Bashir "Ranghar", Major General R.D. Shamim, and Major General "Bachoo" Karim were in Gujranwala and had the authority to counter F.B. Ali's orders.

On 19 December 1971, F.B. Ali arrested the three generals and seized command of Major General "Bachoo" Karim's 6th Armoured Division. Ali then sent Colonels Aleem Afridi and Agha Javed Iqbal to deliver a letter demanding Yahya Khan's resignation by 8 PM that night for being responsible for the loss of East Pakistan. The two Colonels took the letter to Chief of General Staff Gul Hassan, who initially felt saddened by the defeat in the war and told them that he planned to leave the army. However, upon learning about the contents of the letter from the two Colonels, Gul Hassan's mood brightened, and he went to Air Marshal Abdur Rahim Khan. Gul Hassan told Colonel Aleem Afridi and Colonel Agha Javed Iqbal to sit in Major Javed Nasir's office.

Earlier in the day, during an address by General Abdul Hamid Khan in Gujranwala, young officers, led by Brigadier Fazal-e-Rasiq Khan, unleashed a barrage of insults in English, Urdu, and Punjabi towards Abdul Hamid, Yahya Khan, and other superiors. They called them "bloody bastards," "debauches," and "drunkards," expressing their deep frustration.

Abdul Hamid Khan was rushed out of the auditorium and sought advice from Major General A.O. Mitha who stated that he could deploy SSG troops to prevent a potential takeover by 6 Division but there were not enough troops. A.O. Mitha then reached out to Ali suggesting that Abdul Hamid Khan should take over from Yahya Khan. Ali refused stating that Abdul Hamid was too close to Yahya Khan and was just as responsible for the loss of East Pakistan.

Meanwhile, the reports of near mutiny in Gujranwala prompted Gul Hassan Khan and Air Marshal Abdur Rahim Khan to go to Yahya Khan, telling him to resign. Zulfikar Ali Bhutto was invited by Abdur Rahim Khan and Gul Hassan Khan from Rome to assume leadership, leading to him becoming the fourth President of Pakistan.

==== Hamoodur Rahman Commission ====
A witness mentioned him in the Hamoodur Rahman Commission report for asking soldiers how many Bengalis they had shot during his visits to East Pakistan.

Despite there being no other mention of Gul Hassan's role in the Bengali genocide, Bengali Dr. A.H. Jaffor Ullah believes Gul Hassan did play a role, though not as the main actor. While Dr. Jaffor Ullah acknowledges that Gul Hassan was not the one who directly executed orders as Lt. Gen. Tikka Khan was the trigger man, Dr. Jaffor Ullah argues that Hassan provided intellectual support and leadership, contributing to the genocide's occurrence.

==== Commander-in-Chief (1971-1972) ====
Commander-in-Chief Gul Hassan arrives at the Western Front as part of his morale-boosting plan after the previous leadership surrendered, 1971

President Zulfikar Ali Bhutto, Lt. General Gul Hassan, and Air Marshal Abdur Rahim Khan, meet with Premier Zhou Enlai in Peking, 1972

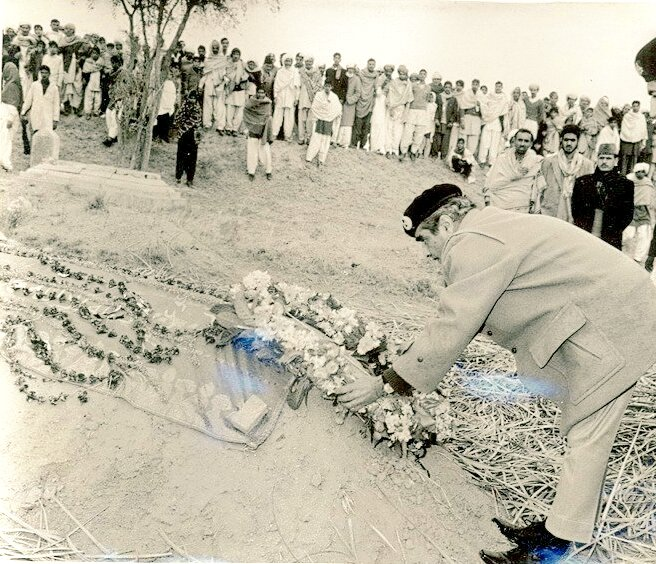
Gul Hassan laying a wreath at the grave of Sawar Muhammad Hussain, 1972

After Zulfikar Ali Bhutto arrived in Pakistan from Rome on the jet that Abdur Rahim Khan sent for him, Bhutto called Gul Hassan to take over the post of Commander-in-Chief of the Pakistan Army, which Gul Hassan refused citing the fact that the army had been demoralised from the defeat.

In a meeting at the Punjab House with Zulfikar Ali Bhutto, Gul Hassan gave Bhutto four conditions if he were to accept the role:

- He wanted to remain a Lieutenant General, even though the Commander-in-Chief was traditionally a four-star General.
- Bhutto had to organise the withdrawal of troops from the border.
- Martial Law had to be lifted.
- Bhutto would not meddle in the operations of the Pakistan Army.

Bhutto accepted Hassan's conditions and in a televised address on 20 December 1971 said:

ADDRESS
PRESIDENT OF PAKISTAN ZULFIKAR ALI BHUTTO

"I have asked General Gul Hassan to be acting Commander-in-Chief. He is a professional soldier. I do not think he has dabbled in politics and I think he has the respect and support of the Armed Forces... but he will retain the rank of lieutenant general. We are not going to make unnecessary promotions. We are a poor country. We are not going to unnecessarily fatten people."

The next day, Gul Hassan called President Bhutto and asked why he had claimed that it was his decision to keep Gul Hassan as a Lt Gen, as if Hassan had not chosen to remain in the rank as one of his conditions for accepting the post. Bhutto responded by saying the Commander-in-Chief did not grasp politics well and missed the point. Despite Gul Hassan's request to keep politics out of their dealings, Bhutto persisted. Days later, Bhutto asked if Gul Hassan had watched the Dhaka surrender film, inviting him to view it. Gul Hassan refused, feeling that Bhutto, now the Supreme Commander of the Armed Forces, was aggravating wounds instead of healing them. Gul Hassan later discovered Bhutto had brought the film from abroad and aired it on national television repeatedly until public outcry halted it.

Bhutto later wanted to join the Commander-in-Chief on a troop tour, but Gul Hassan refused. He feared that Bhutto, as a skilled public speaker, would twist the situation to suggest Gul Hassan lacked courage. Gul Hassan believed Bhutto would win politically either way, making him appear weak or overshadow Gul Hassan's authority.

===== Resignation =====
Gul Hassan and Air Marshal Abdur Rahim Khan refused Prime Minister Zulfikar Ali Bhutto's orders of sending in the Pakistan Army and Pakistan Air Force to end a strike of police officers protesting for pay increase. They believed that their forces should be kept out of political matters and the civilian leadership should deal with it. Bhutto termed the police strike as a mutiny and made the two resign from their positions for not following his illegal orders.

Bhutto invited the two chiefs to a meeting and initiated the discussion by saying, "Gentlemen, the country is going through one crisis after another and with the latest one being the strike by the police and for which no cooperation has been forthcoming from the army and the air force when asked for, I regret that a stage has come when we can no longer carry on like this. Therefore I am not prepared to run the government in this sort of an environment." As soon as Bhutto finished, Gul Hassan, stood up and confronted Bhutto, and said: "Well that's all right Mr President but let me also make it clear that this kind of non-cooperation will continue if the demands placed on the services and especially on the army is not lawful. And as far as I am personally concerned I want to make it quite clear that I am ready to quit right now."

After Gul Hassan's statement, Bhutto "wore a mischievous smile" and promptly handed over two file covers to Gul Hassan and Abdur Rahim Khan. Inside were resignation letters prepared for them to sign. Gul Hassan, threw the file back at Bhutto, who then attempted to shake his hand.

== Diplomatic career ==
Gul Hassan was appointed as Pakistan's ambassador to Austria by President Zulfikar Ali Bhutto on 26 May 1972. Bhutto designated Gul Hassan as Ambassador of Pakistan to Greece in April 1975.

On 15 April 1977, in a letter of resignation, Gul Hassan condemned the leadership of Prime Minister Zulfikar Ali Bhutto and called him a traitor for his role in the loss of East Pakistan. Hassan further accused him of failing the people of Pakistan, causing chaos and violence in the country, exploiting the nation for personal gain, and rigging the 1977 Pakistani general election. Subsequently, the Government of Pakistan alongside the Federal Investigation Agency (FIA) filed an FIR against Gul Hassan for "hatred or contempt and inciting disaffection towards the Government."

== Later life and death ==
Afterwards, Gul Hassan started a carpet business and lived a quiet life, residing in two rooms of the Artillery Mess at the General Headquarters. In his final years, he divided his time between Rawalpindi and Vienna, where his wife and their son lived.

In a 1997 interview with Rediff, Gul Hassan responded to a question regarding Benazir Bhutto's assertion that her hawkish stance on India caused her to lose the election, stating: "Benazir talks rubbish. She is highly immature and so was her father. One American journalist, who was writing a book on Bhutto, came and asked me, "Everybody says that Bhutto was intelligent. Do you find him intelligent?" I said, "If he was intelligent, he would have been alive today." Who says Benazir was harsh on India?"

Gul Hassan Khan died on 10 October 1999 and was buried in Pabbi in Nowshera District (Main town of Chirrat Cant, Chowki Mumriaz, Taroo Jaba, Akber Pura). Prior to his death, Gul Hassan had a small amount of money in his bank account and instructed that his burial cloth be brought with it.

== Published work ==
Memoirs of Lt. Gen. Gul Hassan Khan. Oxford University Press. 1993. ISBN 9780195774474.

== Interviews ==
"'Farooq Abdullah is nobody to say that Pakistan should take this and India should take this'". Rediff. 1997.

"'The US thinks they can bully anyone'". Rediff. 1997.

"'Benazir talks rubbish. She is highly immature and so was her father'". Rediff. 1997.

== Awards and decorations ==
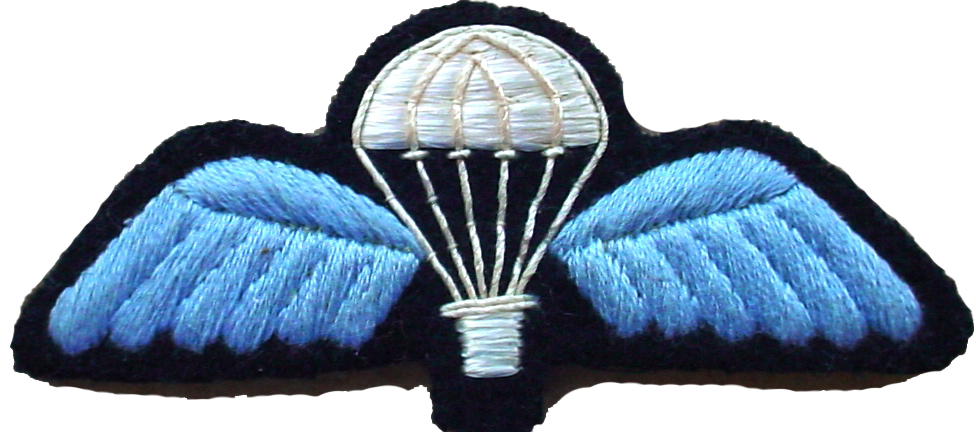

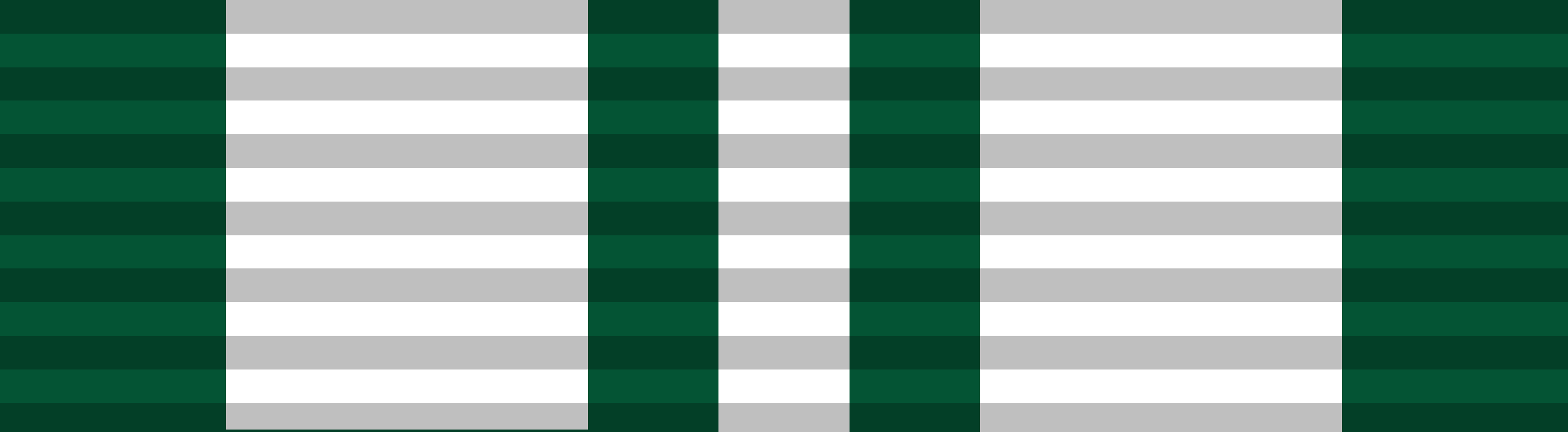

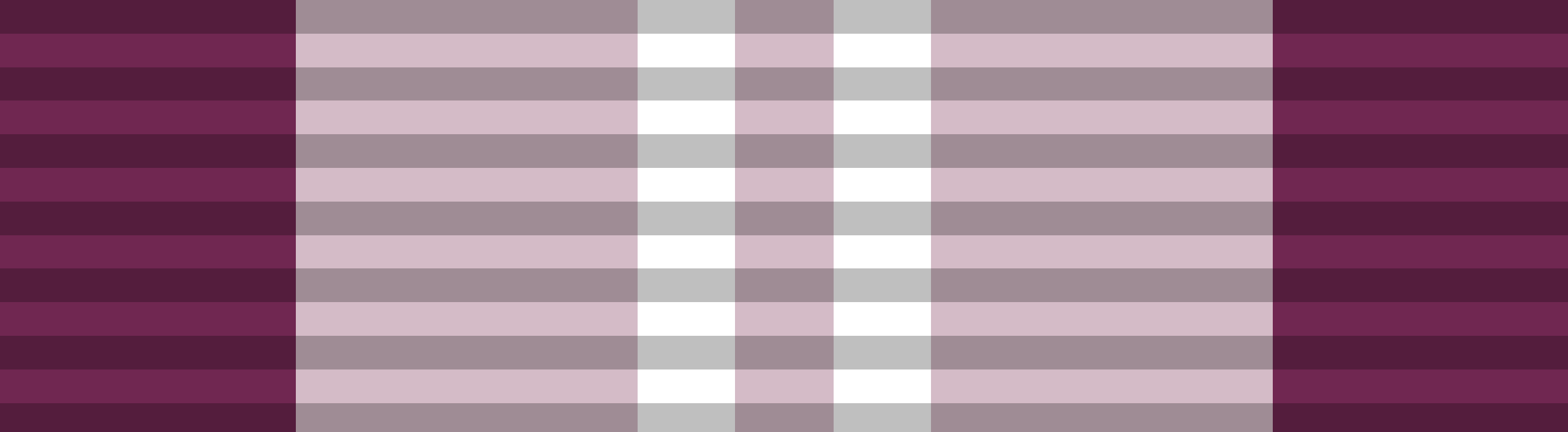

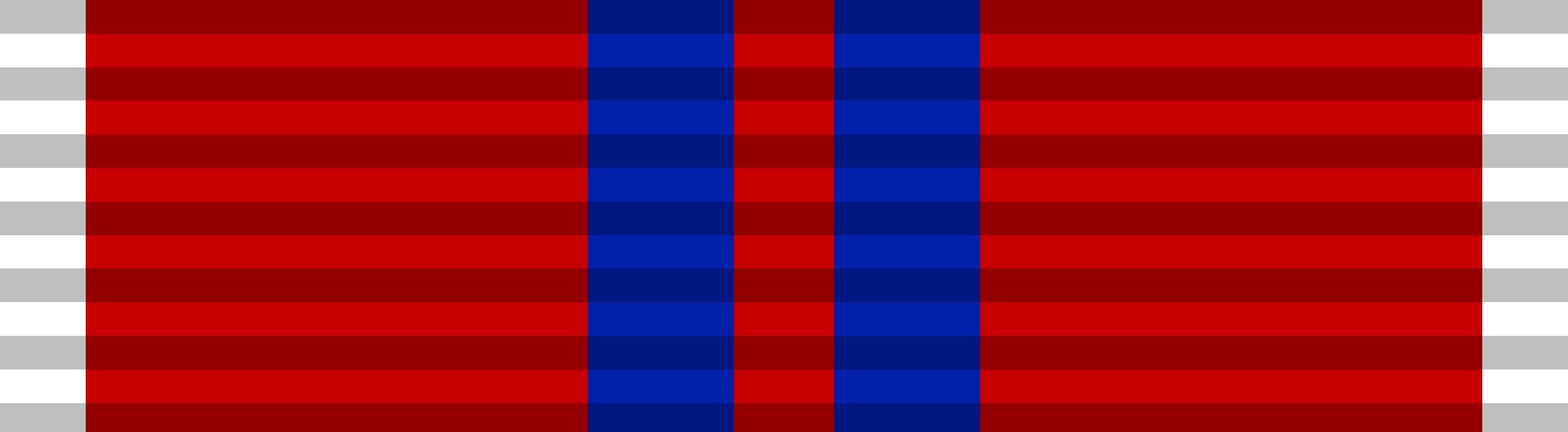

Parachutist Badge
Sitara-e-Pakistan (Star of Pakistan) (SPk)		Sitara-e-Quaid-e-Azam (SQA)	
Tamgha-e-Diffa (Defence Medal): 1. 1965 War Clasp; 2. 1971 War Clasp	Tamgha-e-Jang 1965 War (War Medal 1965)	Tamgha-e-Jang 1971 War (War Medal 1971)	Pakistan Tamgha (Pakistan Medal) 1947
Tamgha-e-Qayam-e-Jamhuria (Republic Commemoration Medal) 1956	Burma Star	War Medal 1939–1945	Queen Elizabeth II Coronation Medal (1953)

=== Foreign decorations ===
Foreign Awards
UK	Burma Star
UK	War Medal 1939–1945
UK	Queen Elizabeth II Coronation Medal

== See also ==
- Sahabzada Yaqub Khan
- General Musa Khan
- Rao Farman Ali
- General Mitha

== Notes ==
Military offices
Preceded by Sahabzada Yaqub Khan	Chief of General Staff; 1968–1971	Succeeded by M. Rahim Khan
Preceded by Yahya Khan	Commander-in-Chief of the Pakistan Army; 1971–1972	Succeeded by Chief of Army Staff; Tikka Khan
