= Qadirabad Cantonment =

Bangladeshi military cantonment

- কাদিরাবাদ সেনানিবাস
- Natore, Rajshahi, Bangladesh
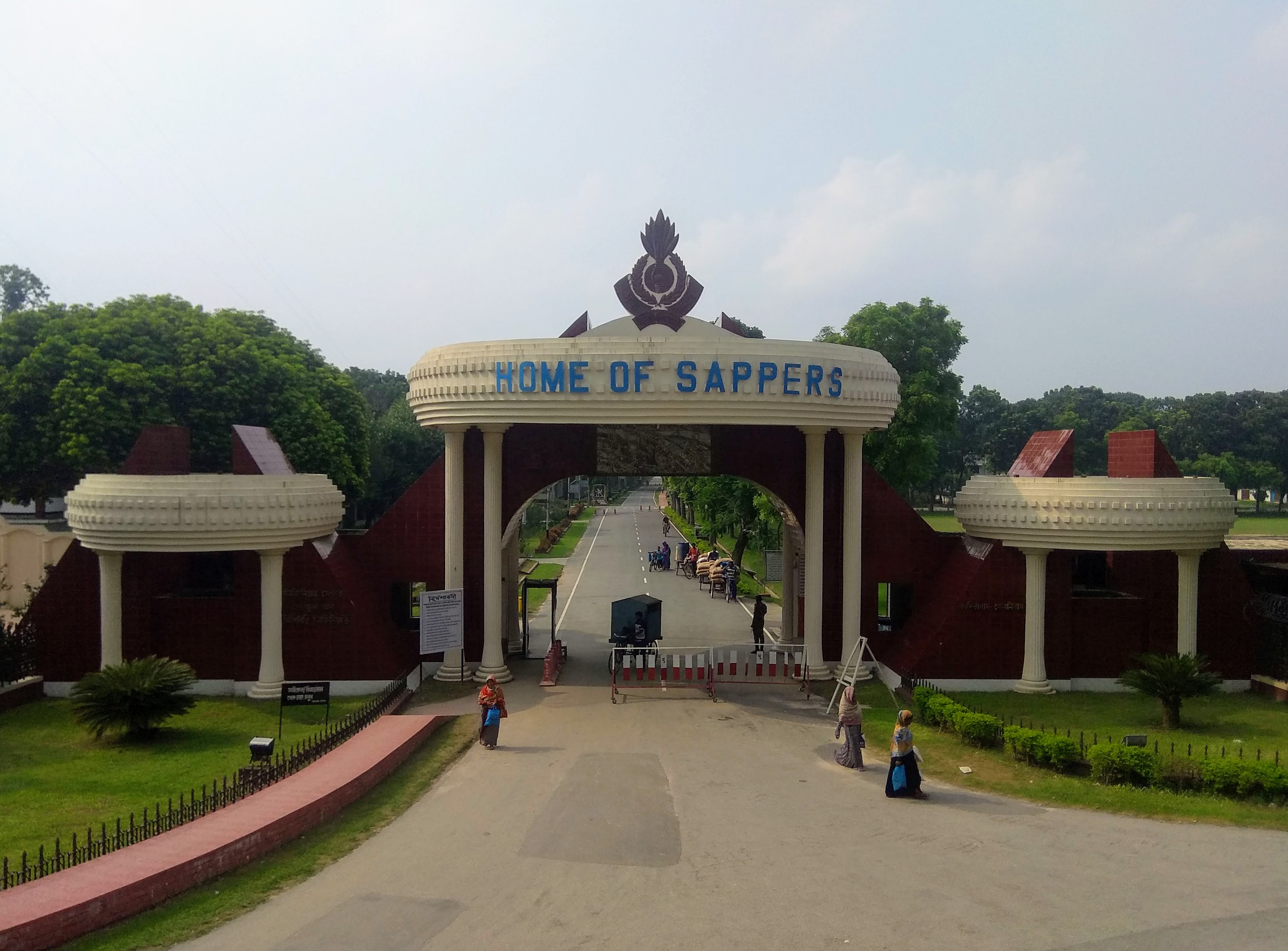
- Main Gate of Qadirabad Cantonment

Site information
- Type: Cantonment
- Controlled by: Bangladesh Army

Qadirabad Cantonment is a cantonment located in southwestern part of Natore, Rajshahi in Bangladesh. It is the garrison headquarters of Engineer Center and School of Military Engineering.

== History ==
The cantonment was named after Lt Col Abdul Qadir, who was killed in the Bangladesh War. His son Nadeem Qadir discovered the body in a mass grave in Panchlaish Thana, Chittagong District in 2007; he was reburied in the cantonment in September 2011.

== Installations ==
- Engineer Centre and School of Military Engineering (ECSME)
  - 5th Engineers Regiment (attached under 11th Infantry Division)
  - ECSME Training Battalion
- Station Headquarters, Qadirabad (attached under 11th Infantry Division)
  - Static Signal Company
  - Garrison Engineers (Army), Qadirabad
  - OSP-3

== Institutions ==
=== Educational institutions ===
- Qadirabad Cantonment Public School
- Bangladesh Army University of Engineering & Technology
- Qadirabad Cantonment Sapper College
- Mahmudul Hasan Primary School

=== Medical facilities ===
- Combined Military Hospital
