= Operation Searchlight =

1971 Pakistani army offensive

- Part of the Bangladesh Liberation War and Bangladesh genocide
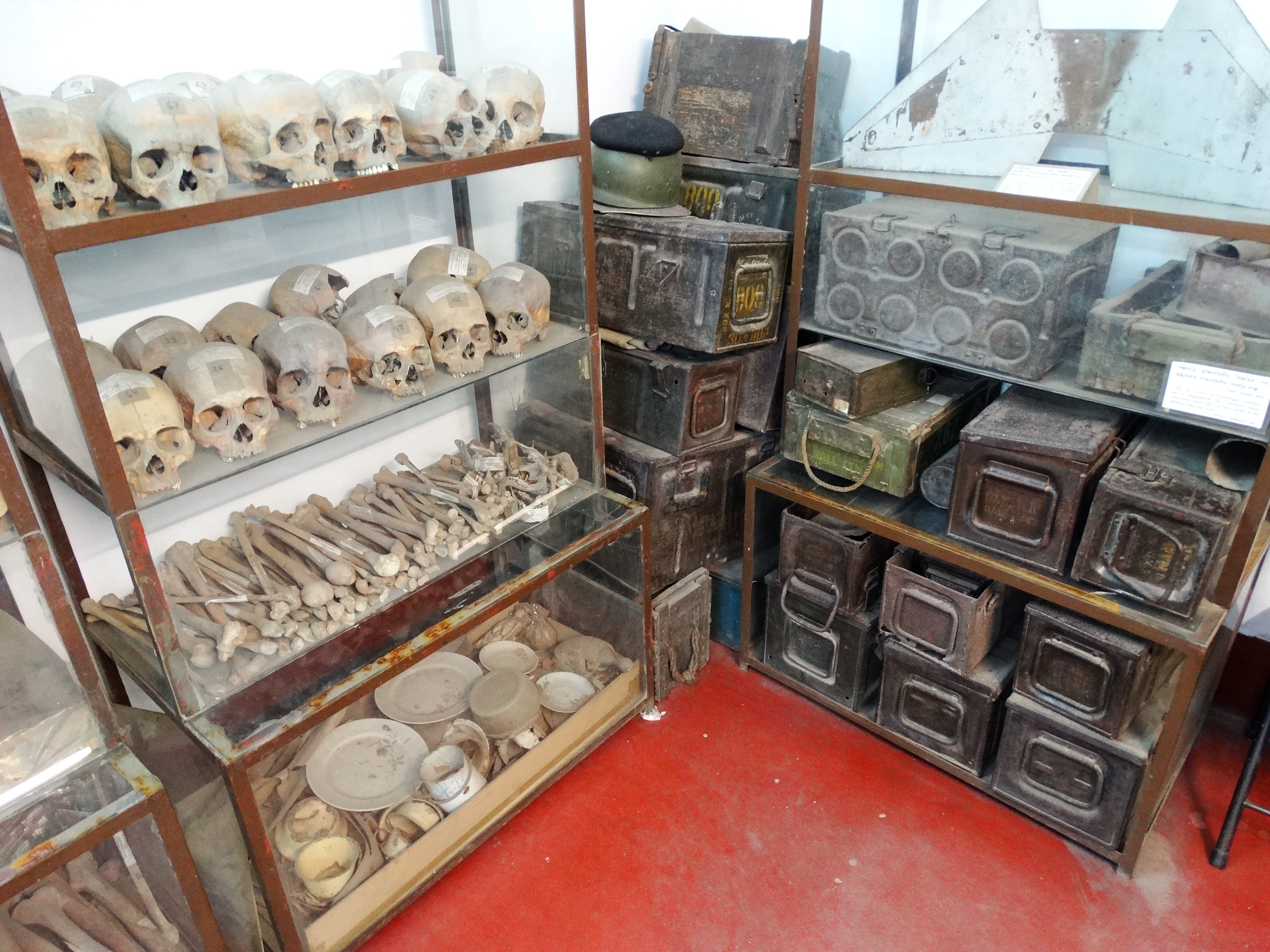
- Human remains and war material from the Bangladesh genocide at the Liberation War Museum, Dhaka, Bangladesh
Date	26 March 1971 – 20 May 1971
Location	East Pakistan (present-day Bangladesh)
Result	Pakistani operational success: Arrest of Sheikh Mujibur Rahman; Major East Pakistani towns captured by Pakistan Army; Initiation of Bangladesh Liberation War; Start of the Bangladesh genocide; Mass killing of West Pakistanis by Bengali nationalists; (see Aftermath section)
Territorial changes	Provisional Government of Bangladesh declares independence from Pakistan

Belligerents
Provisional Government of Bangladesh (Apr.–Dec.): Mukti Bahini	Pakistan: Pakistan Armed Forces; Pakistani loyalists

Commanders and leaders
(Bangladesh) Tajuddin Ahmad; M. A. G. Osmani	Yahya Khan; Abdul Hamid Khan; (Pakistan) Tikka Khan; (Pakistan) A. O. Mitha; (Pakistan) Khadim Hussain Raja; (Pakistan) Rao Farman Ali; (Pakistan) William Harrison; Mohammad Shariff

Strength
Bengali Resistance Forces: ~8,000 defected Bengali troops from East Bengal Regiment; Paramilitary Forces: ~13,000 defected East Pakistan Rifles; ~30,000+ defected East Pakistani police and Bangladesh Ansar personnel armed with .303 rifles; Reinforcements: Unknown number of ex-servicemen and civilian volunteers	Pakistan Army: 14th Infantry Division (approx. 18,000+ troops); 1 armoured regiment (75 M24 Chaffee tanks); Paramilitary Forces: ~3,000 East Pakistan Rifles; 1,800 East Pakistani police personnel; Pakistan Navy: 4 gunboats; 1 patrol boat; 1 destroyer; Pakistan Air Force: 20 North American Sabrejets; 3 T-33 jet trainers; 4 helicopters; 5 C-130 Hercules transport aircraft; Land Reinforcements: 9th Infantry Division; 16th Infantry Division

Casualties and losses
Mukti Bahini: unknown; ~10,000+ POWs	~6,000 KIA or wounded; Small number of POWs

Operation Searchlight was a military operation carried out by the Pakistan Army in an effort to curb the Bengali nationalist movement in former East Pakistan in March 1971. Pakistan retroactively justified the operation on the basis of anti-Bihari violence carried out en masse by the Bengalis earlier that month. (Note: Although the reason was non-cooperation movement.) Ordered by the central government in West Pakistan, the original plans envisioned taking control of all of East Pakistan's major cities on 26 March, and then eliminating all Bengali opposition, whether political or military within the following month.

West Pakistani military leaders had not anticipated prolonged Bengali resistance or later Indian military intervention. The main phase of Operation Searchlight ended with the fall of the last major Bengali-held town to West Pakistan in mid-May 1971. The operation also directly precipitated the 1971 Bangladesh genocide, in which between 300,000 and 3,000,000 Bengalis were killed while around 10 million fled to neighbouring India as refugees.

Bengali intelligentsia, academics, and Hindus were widely targeted alongside Bengali nationalists—with widespread, indiscriminate extrajudicial killings. The nature of these systematic purges enraged the Bengalis, who declared independence from West Pakistan to establish the new nation of Bangladesh in the erstwhile region of East Bengal.

The widespread violence resulting from Pakistan's Operation Searchlight ultimately led to the Bangladesh Liberation War, in which Mukti Bahini guerrillas fought to remove Pakistani forces from East Pakistan. The civil war escalated in the following months as East Pakistani loyalists, primarily Biharis, formed militias to support West Pakistani troops on the ground against the Mukti Bahini. However, the conflict took a decisive turn in the Bengalis' favour following the ill-fated Operation Chengiz Khan, which resulted in direct Indian military intervention in the civil war, eventually prompting Pakistan's unconditional surrender to the joint command of Indian forces and the Mukti Bahini on 16 December 1971.

== Background ==
After the Bengali Awami League had won a decisive majority (capturing 167 out of 313 seats) in the 1970 Pakistan parliamentary elections, the Bengali population expected a swift transfer of power to the Awami League based on the Six Point Programme. On 28 February 1971, Yahya Khan, then President of Pakistan, under the pressure of Zulfikar Ali Bhutto's Pakistan Peoples Party (PPP), postponed the national assembly meeting scheduled for March 3rd. The PPP had already started lobbying to weaken the stand of Sheikh Mujibur Rahman, and Bhutto was heard saying that he wanted the Bengalis to stay away. The Awami League, in response to the postponement, launched a program of non-cooperation (largely outlined in the 7 March Awami League rally), which was so successful that the authority of the Pakistani government became limited to military cantonments and official government institutions in East Pakistan.

Clashes between Bengalis and the Pakistan Army, as well as between Bengalis and Biharis, erupted and soon became widespread. President Yahya Khan flew to Dacca to hold talks with Mujibur Rahman, then leader of the Awami League, in March and was later joined by Bhutto, whose party had secured the second-largest share of seats (81 out of 300) in the general elections. Unwilling to transfer federal power from West Pakistan to East Pakistan as demanded by the Awami League (fearing a transfer of power would weaken or destroy the multiethnic Pakistani federation) or to lose face by backing down in face of the non-cooperation movement, the West Pakistani generals, most of whom (including Commander-in-Chief Gul Hassan Khan) supported the PPP, finally decided on a military crackdown against the rebelling Bengalis in East Pakistan.

After the convening of the Pakistan National Assembly was postponed by Yahya Khan on 1 March, ethnic Biharis in East Pakistan, who supported West Pakistan, were targeted by the Bengali majority. In early March 1971, over 300 Biharis were killed in rioting by Bengali mobs in Chittagong. The total death toll from anti-Bihari violence perpetrated by Bengali nationalists prior to the launch of Operation Searchlight is disputed, with estimates ranging from several thousand to tens of thousands Biharis killed in the carnage. Following these series of incidents, the Government of Pakistan used the "Bihari massacre" to justify its military intervention in East Pakistan on 25 March, when it initiated Operation Searchlight.

Prior to the launch of the operation, a final meeting was held at the Army General Headquarters (GHQ). The Governor of East Pakistan, Vice Admiral S. M. Ahsan, objected to the planned operation. Air Commodore Muhammad Zafar Masud, the Air Officer Commanding (AOC) of the Pakistan Air Force base in Dacca, also objected to the operation. Masud was wary of a military crackdown, suspecting that it would only provoke East Pakistan's Bengali-majority population into more violence. However, under pressure during the meeting from Pakistan Army and Air Force generals, Yahya Khan gave orders to his commanders to launch the operation. Admiral Ahsan was subsequently relieved of the governorship. When the operation came into effect, Zafar Masud refused to conduct air sorties and was likewise removed from his post on 31 March.

== Operational plan ==
=== Planning process ===
The plan was drawn up in March 1971 by Major General Khadim Hussain Raja, GOC 14th Division, and Major General Rao Farman Ali, as a follow-up to decisions taken at a meeting of the Pakistan Army staff on 22 February. The 16th infantry division from Quetta and the 9th division from Kharian, West Pakistan, were ordered to prepare to move to East Pakistan in mid-February also as a result of that meeting.

The governor of East Pakistan, Vice Admiral S. M. Ahsan, opposed the use of military force and was subsequently removed from his position. His successor, Lieutenant General Shahabzada Yakub Khan, the General Officer Commanding (GOC) of East Pakistan, held a similar view and resigned shortly thereafter. Lieutenant General Tikka Khan became the Governor and GOC of East Pakistan. On 17 March, General Raja was given authority to plan the operation via telephone by General Abdul Hamid Khan, Chief of Staff of the Pakistan Army. On the morning of 18 March, General Raja and Major General Rao Farman Ali wrote the plan at the GOC's office at Dhaka (Dhaka) cantonment. The plan was written on a "Light Blue Office Pad with a Lead Pencil" by General Farman, containing "16 Paragraphs Spread Over Five Pages".

General Farman defined the operational premises and conditions for success, while General Khadim Raja dealt with the distribution of forces and tasks assigned to the individual brigades and other units. It assumed that the Bengali Army and other military units would revolt at the onset of operations, and the planners suggested that all armed Bengali units should be disarmed prior to commencing the operation and the political leadership arrested during a planned meeting with the President, General Yahya Khan. No operational reserves were earmarked.

The handwritten plan was reviewed by General Abdul Hamid Khan and Lt. General Tikka Khan on 20 March at the flag staff house. General Abdul Hamid Khan objected to the immediate disarming of regular army Bengali units but approved the disarming of the East Pakistan Rifles (EPR), armed police and other paramilitary formations. Yahya Khan refused to sanction the arrest of Awami League leaders during a meeting with him, as the plan had proposed. The amended plan was approved and distributed to various area commanders.

The Operation was to start on the night of 25 March 1971 in Dhaka, and other garrisons were to be alerted via phone about their zero hour to start their activities. General Farman Ali commanded the forces in Dhaka, while the rest of the province was commanded by General Khadim. Lt. General Tikka Khan and his staff were present in the 31st field command centre to supervise and support the command staff of the 14th division. The initial plan to arrest by a company of No 3 SSG, led by major ZA Khan, was scheduled at 0100 on 26 March night.

== Major components of the plan ==
=== Operational premises ===
As outlined by the Pakistani planners, the operation aimed to eliminate the Awami League apparatus and any civilians and personnel of the armed forces supporting the Awami League movement in defiance of martial law. Cunning, surprise, deception and speed was emphasised as crucial for success. Use of free and greater force was authorised. Search and assault of civilian areas and Hindu areas also were authorised.

=== Requirements for success ===
Requirements for success:

1. Operation to be launched simultaneously all across East Pakistan.
2. Maximum number of political and student leaders, and those among cultural organisations and teaching staff to be arrested.
3. Operation must achieve 100% success in Dhaka. Dhaka University would be occupied and searched.
4. Free and greater use of fire authorised for securing cantonments.
5. All internal and international communications to be cut off, including telephone, television, radio and telegraph.
6. All East Pakistani (Bengali) troops to be neutralised by seizing weapons and ammunition.
7. To deceive the Awami League, President Yahya Khan to pretend to continue dialogue, even if Mr. Bhutto disagrees, and to agree to Awami League demands.

The designated centres of offensive operations under that plan were Dhaka, Khulna, Chittagong, Comilla, Jessore, Rajshahi, Rangpur, Saidpur and Sylhet, areas where West Pakistani army units were concentrated. Pakistani Army units and paramilitary elements in other areas of East Pakistan were to maintain control of their respective areas and await reinforcements during the initial phase of the operation. Once Dhaka had been secured, the 9th and 16th divisions from Pakistan were to be airlifted into East Pakistan as reinforcements. Cities with airfields (Chittagong, Sylhet, Jessore, Rangpur, Comilla) would be reinforced via C-130 aircraft or heliborne troops directly from Dhaka.

Although the plan did not specify the time needed to subdue East Pakistan, it was assumed that after the arrest of the political leadership and disarming of the Bengali military and paramilitary units, civilians could be terrorised into submitting to martial law within a week. Lt. Gen. Tikka Khan estimated that no resistance would remain after 10 April.

=== Composition of Pakistan Armed Forces in East Pakistan ===
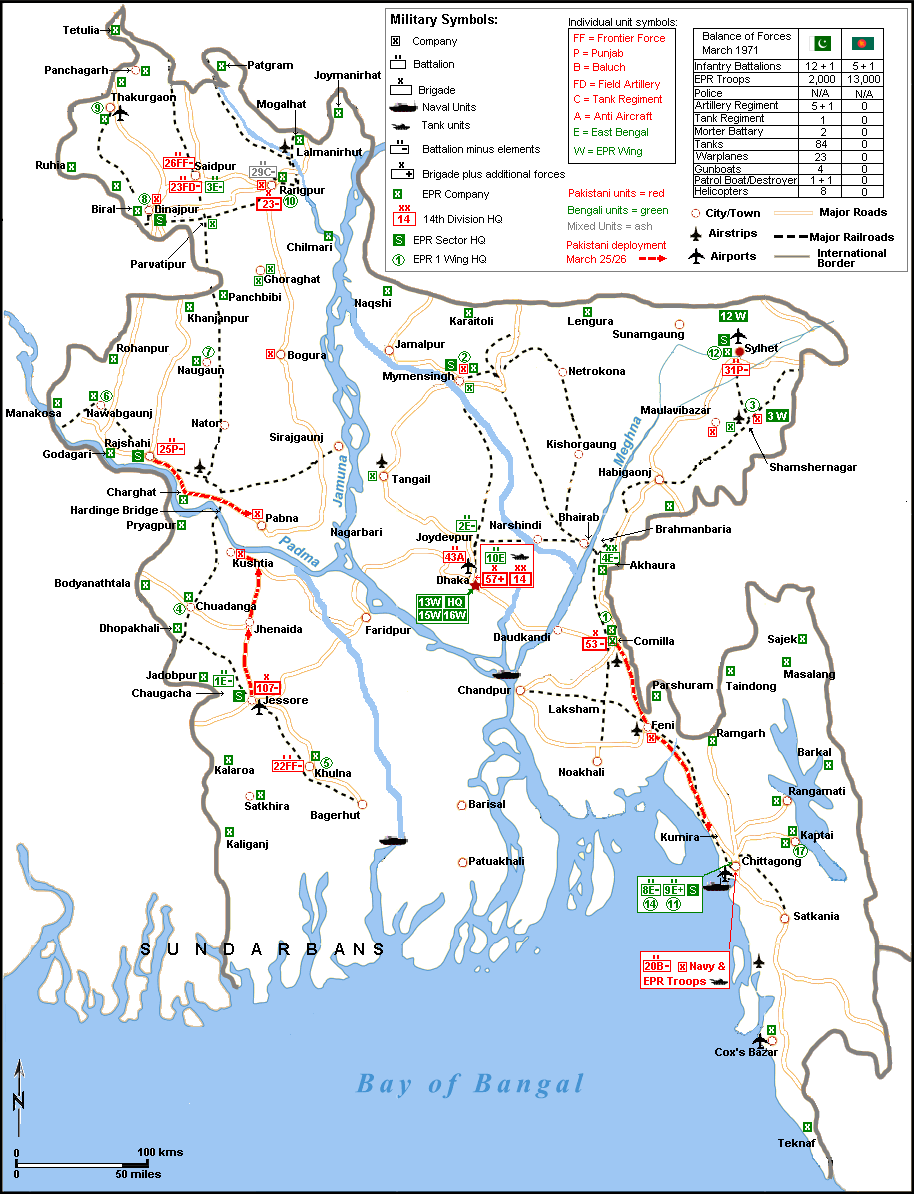
Operation Searchlight: The location of Pakistani and Bengali units on 25 March 1971. Some unit locations are not shown.

The 14th infantry division was the only Pakistan Army division stationed in East Pakistan in March 1971. This division had four infantry brigades attached to it, instead of the normally allotted three brigades. The 57th infantry brigade (under Brig. Jahanzab Arbab – W. Pakistani) was headquartered in Dhaka, the 53rd (Brig. Iqbal Shafi- W. Pakistani) was in Comilla, the 23rd (Brig. Abdullah Khan Malik – Pakistani) in Rangpur and the 107th (Brig. A.R. Durrani – W. Pakistani) was in Jessore. Brig. M.H. Mozumdar, a Bengali, was in command of the Chittagong area. Normally, each brigade contained 3 or 4 infantry battalions and a field artillery regiment and various support elements.

These four brigades had 12 infantry battalions (regiments normally had 915 soldiers each) containing purely West Pakistani personnel (mainly hailing from Punjabi, Baluch, Pathan and Sindhi background) before 25 March 1971. This division also had 5 field artillery regiments, a light anti aircraft regiment, a commando battalion (the 3rd), all of which contained a majority of Pakistani personnel, in various East Pakistani bases. The only armoured regiment in East Pakistan, the 29th Cavalry in Rangpur, was a mixed unit.

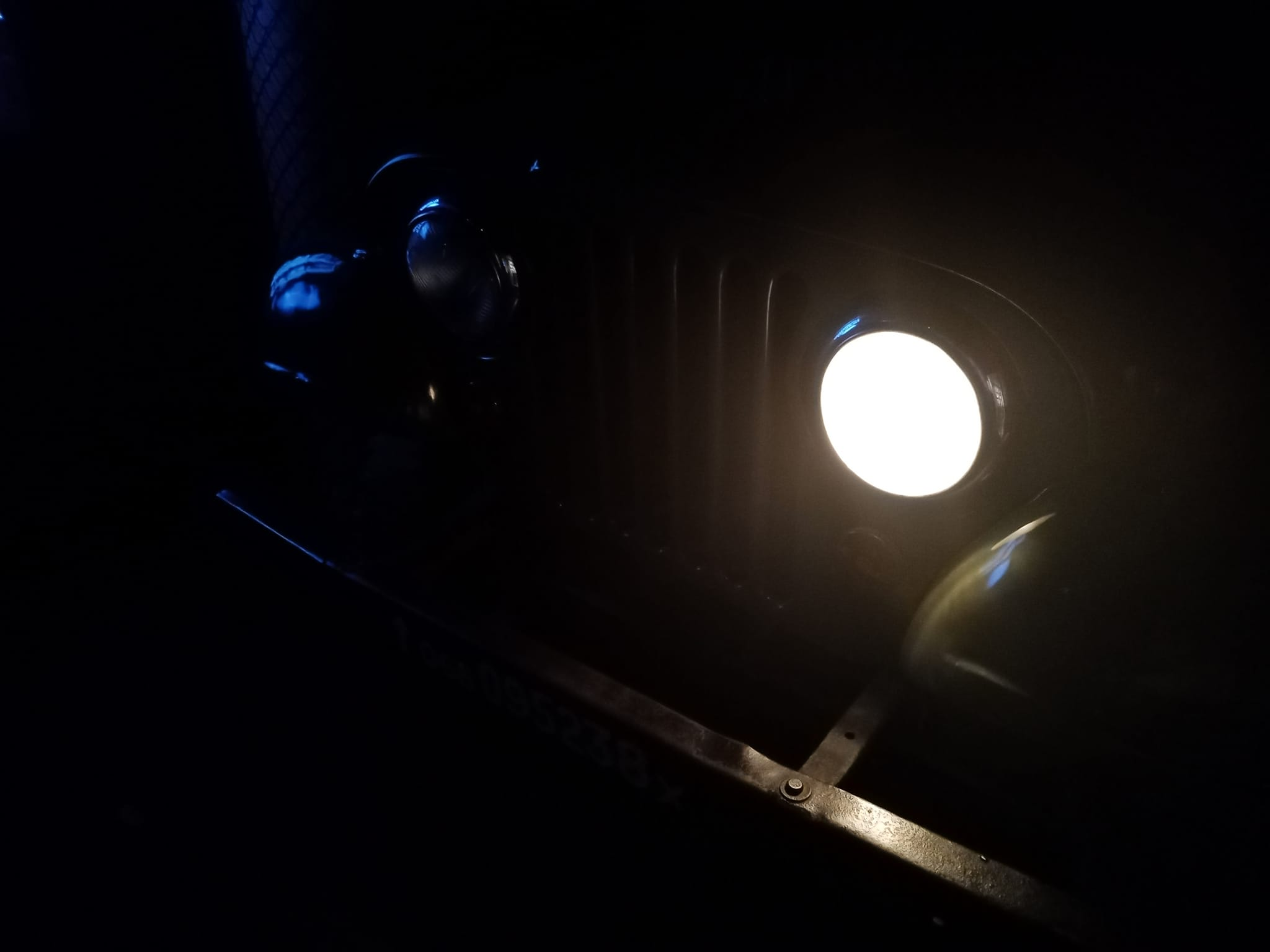
Depiction of Operation Searchlight at the Liberation War Museum

Twenty percent of the East Pakistan Rifles (EPR) personnel were also from West Pakistan, while the support elements of the various units and cantonments were mostly of mixed nationality. Most of the individual unit commanders and majority of the officers were from West Pakistan. West Pakistani Army personnel were also posted at Station HQ, Dhaka, Pakistan Ordnance Factory, Gazipur, Central Ordnance Depot, Dhaka, Ammunition Depot, Rajendrapur, Embercation Unit – Chittagong and with some field intelligence units.

The Pakistan Air Force had 20 F-86 Sabre Jets and 3 T-33 Trainers at the Dhaka airbase. The Army aviation wing had a flight of 2 Mil Mi-8 and 2 Alouette III helicopters, under the command of Major Liakat Bukhari posted in East Pakistan. The whole squadron was transferred to Dhaka after 25 March 1971. C-130 Hercules planes were transferred from West Pakistan to Dhaka for the operation. Airfields were located in Chittagong, Comilla, Lalmonirhat near Rangpur, in Salutikor near Sylhet, in Jessore and near Thakurgaon.

Rear-Admiral Mohammad Shariff (later 4-Star Admiral) was given the command of the navy in East Pakistan. The Pakistan Navy had 4 gunboats (Rajshahi, Jessore, Comilla, and Sylhet) a patrol boat (Balaghat) and the destroyer PNS Jahangir in East Pakistan. PNS Babur, flagship of the Pakistan Navy would visit East Pakistan after the operation started. Major naval bases were located in Dhaka, Chittagong and Mongla.

==== Pakistan Army Bengali units in East Pakistan ====
Six regular army Bengali infantry regiments were present in East Pakistan in March 1971. The 1st East Bengal Regiment (EBR) was in Jessore, attached to the 107th Brigade. The 2nd EBR was in Joydebpur north of Dhaka, attached to the 57th Brigade. The 3rd EBR was in Saidpur with the 23rd Brigade, and the 4th EBR was in Comilla with the 53rd Brigade. The 8th EBR was preparing to ship to West Pakistan and was at 75% strength in Chittagong.

The East Bengal Regimental Center (EBRC) in Chittagong housed 2,000 Bengali troops including the newly raised 9th EBR. The 10th EBR, a training unit, was in the Dhaka cantonment attached to the 14th Division. Bengali officers commanded the 1st, 2nd and the 10th EBR, while the rest were under Pakistani officers.

==== Other Bengali forces ====
East Pakistan Police, almost exclusively Bengali, had 33,995 members of all ranks, 23,606 members were armed while the rest had firearms training. Twenty-five thousand Anser and Mujahid members, all of whom had weapons training, were scattered around the province. The East Pakistan Rifles (EPR), a 15,000 strong paramilitary force, was divided into 17 operational wings (each wing contained 3 to 6 companies of 150 men each) in 7 sectors (headquartered in Dhaka, Mymenshingh, Jessore, Rajshahi, Dinajpur, Sylhet and Chittagong) and was deployed around the country.

The EPR companies were often divided into sections (15–20 soldiers) and platoons (20–35 soldiers) and deployed in camps near the border or in border outposts. Unlike regular army units, EPR companies were commanded by JCO/NCOs (army companies normally were commanded by Captains or Major ranked officers), and EPR wings contained only light anti-tank weapons and a mortar platoon with 6 mortars as artillery. EPR Headquarters and 2,500 EPR troops were posted in Dhaka. The majority of the EPR officers were from West Pakistan, serving on deputation from the regular army for 2 to 3 years.

== Pre operational steps implementation ==
The planners needed to ensure that all Pakistani unit commanders became aware of their role prior to commencing the operation, which had to be done while maintaining complete secrecy. The concentration of forces and allocation of supplies, as well as arrival of reinforcements from West Pakistan and briefing of area commanders had to be carried out without raising suspicion. Senior Pakistani officers visited major garrisons and personally briefed garrison commanders on the operation. General Farman was sent to Khulna, General Khadim briefed Chittagong, while Brig. El-Edrus and Col. Saadullah visited Sylhet and Rangpur.

Secrecy through operations security had been strictly maintained; only a few Lt. Colonels learned about the plan beforehand on a need to know basis. Although some Bengali officers had become suspicious of the all-West Pakistani officer briefings, no one outside the briefings learned the details beforehand.

=== Managing logistics ===
The main ammunition depots were located in Rajendrapur near Dhaka and 9000 tons of arms and ammunition were in Chittagong aboard MV Swat, so it was decided to speed up the unloading of the ship. Pakistani troops started arriving in Dhaka via PIA flights carrying "special passengers", in addition to the 13 FF and 22 Baluch which had already arrived.

Pakistanis planned to send a brigade to East Pakistan to enhance the chance of success prior to 25 March, and the new arrivals were part of that processes.

=== Shuffling of armed forces personnel ===
The army also took steps to enhance their chances of success by relocating Bengali officers away from sensitive areas, and bringing Pakistani troops to the cities. The rotation back to West Pakistan of two Pakistan Army units, the 25th Punjab and the 20th Baluch was delayed, while the 13th Frontier Force and the 22nd Baluch regiments were flown to Dhaka from West Pakistan before 25 March. To maintain secrecy, no major reinforcements were initially sent to the other garrisons in East Pakistan before 25 March.

Brig. Mozumdar, who had refused to fire on Bengali civilians blocking the unloading of MV Swat, was relieved of his post on 24 March by Gen. Khadim himself on the pretext that he was needed to address 2 EBR at Joydebpur and Brig. M.H. Ansari (West Pakistani – Station Commander Dhaka) took command of Chittagong area. Maj. Khaled Musharraf, Brigade Major of the 57th Brigade in Dhaka, was sent to 4th EBR in Comilla as 2IC on 22 March.

Lt. Col. Masudul Hasan Khan (CO 2nd EBR) was relieved of his post on 23 March, and Lt. Col. Quazi A.F.M.A Raquib took over on 25 March. Pakistanis refrained from mass transfer of Bengali officers, as that might have compromised security of the plan. Bengali officers were urged to take leave (although all leave had been cancelled since February 1971), while West Pakistani officers were told to stay put. Families of West Pakistani officers and soldiers were evacuated from East Pakistan, and when possible families of some West Pakistani civilians were brought into the cities.

==== Dispersion of Bengali units before 25 March ====
Denied permission by General Hamid to disarm the regular Bengali army units en masse before the crackdown, the Pakistani command employed other ploys to minimise the threat of these formations.

Bengali units were sent out of the cantonments, or were broken into smaller units and deployed away from each other, and cut off from the main radio and wireless communication grid before or on 25 March. Bengali officers were sent on leave, or were posted away from command centres or units directly involved in the operation. In some cases, West Pakistani officers took command of Bengali formations. Some Bengali soldiers were sent on leave, and some were disarmed on various pretexts whenever possible without raising alarm.

The 1st EBR (at 50% strength), was sent out of Jessore cantonment to Chaugacha near the border for winter training, where they stayed until 29 March. Companies of the 2nd EBR were disbursed around areas outside Dhaka and their radio communication net was shut off. The 3rd EBR had its companies disbursed around Ghoraghat, and at Parvatipur outside the Saidpur cantonment. The 4th EBR units were deployed between Brahmanbaria and Shamshernagar. Only in Chittagong did the regular Bengali army units remain in their respective bases.

West Pakistani EPR troops were posted in the cities whenever possible, while Bengali EPR troops were sent to the border outposts. Most EPR units were away from the main action areas, and would need at least a day to reach the major cities. The EPR wireless net was shut off on the night of 24 or 25 March.

== Operation Searchlight: 25/26 March to 10 April ==
This is a brief description of the units engaged and the result of Pakistani military action from 25 March until 10 April, when the operation was supposed to end. This only covers events in the areas that were the major focus of Operation Searchlight, not the Bengali resistance throughout East Pakistan. In some areas, Pakistani assault and mass murders started clashes with the Bengali forces on 25 March. In other areas, no clashes took place until as late as 30 March.

=== Dhaka ===
Operation Searchlight: The location of Pakistani targets in Dhaka on 25 March 1971. Map is not to exact scale.

Pakistani troops in Dhaka, commanded by Maj. Gen. Farman, had the following objectives:

- Impose curfew at 01:10, close telephone/telegraph/radio stations, and shut all presses down
- Seal off the city by taking over road, rail and river communication and patrol rivers
- Arrest Sheikh Mujib and 15 top Awami League leaders during operation
- Conduct house to house searches in Dhanmondi and Hindu areas
- Subdue Dhaka University, EPR HQ and Rajarbagh police line, disarm 2nd and 10th EBR
- Take over and protect the ammunition factory at Gazipur and the arms depot at Rajendrapur.

Pakistani forces: In addition to the Eastern Command HQ, the headquarters of the 14th division and the 57th brigade were also located in Dhaka cantonment. The regular army units present were: the 57th Brigade containing: 18th and 32nd Punjab (C.O: Lt. Col. Taj) regiments, 13th Frontier Force regiment, 22nd Baluch regiment, 604th Intelligence unit and the 31st Field Artillery Regiment (CO: Lt. Col. Zahid Hassan).

The 14th division HQ had the following units attached to it: 43rd Light Ack-Ack regiment (CO: Lt. Col. Shaffat Ali – Pakistani), elements of the 3rd Commando Battalion (CO: Lt. Col. Z.A. Khan – Pakistani), 19th Signal Regiment (CO: Lt. Col. Ifthekhar Hussain -Pakistani) and the 149th infantry workshop. PAF personnel were stationed at the Tejgaon Airport.

A squadron of at least 14 M24 Chaffee tanks from the 29th Cavalry regiment was stationed in Dhaka along with 2 Tank troops with 6 PT-76 tanks. In addition to these units, other support elements (engineering, supply and medical units) of the 57th brigade, the 14th division and the Eastern Command HQ were located in Dhaka.

Bengali forces: The 10th EBR, called "National Service Battalion" had a few trainers under the command of Lt. Col Moyeeduddin Ahmed, a Bengali officer. 2,500 EPR troops were attached with the EPR HQ (the 13th, 15th and 16th wings, plus the EPR HQ wing) at Pilkhana. Each EPR wing contained 3 companies, although most EPR troops were at Pilkhana, 2 companies were deployed in Mirpur, two at the President house and one at the Governor house in the city.

W. Pakistani Brig. Nissar Ahmad Khan was the director general of all EPR while Lt. Col. Anwar Hossain Shah (W. Pakistani) commanded EPR Dhaka sector troops. The Rajarbag police line housed at least 2,000 armed police. 2nd EBR (C.O: Lt. Col. Rakib – Bengali) was at Joydebpur to the north of Dhaka, with one company in Tangail and one at Mymensying and a small detachment at Gazipur. EPR 2nd wing HQ (C.O – Capt. Qamar Abbas – W. Pakistani) was also at Mymensingh, containing no Bengali officers.

Course of events:

The Pakistani plan of action for Dhaka, as drawn up by Maj. Gen. Farman, was:

1. 13th Frontier Force to stay in cantonment as reserve and provide security
2. 43rd Light Ack Ack regiment was to secure Tejgaon airport
3. 22nd Baluch regiment would disarm the EPR and seize wireless at Pilkhana EPR HQ
4. 32nd Punjab was to neutralise Rajarbag Police line
5. 18th Punjab was to fan out and secure Nawabpur and old Dhaka
6. 31st Field was to secure Second capital, Mohammadpur and Mirpur
7. A platoon from 3 SSG was to capture Sheikh Mujib
8. 22nd Baluch and 32nd Punjab was to neutralise Dhaka University "rebels"
9. 22 Baluch would be reinforced at Pilkhana

Bengali EPR officers were detained by the Pakistanis in Pilkhana and the troops were mostly ordered to stand down and relax, while 22nd Baluch took over security duties at Pilkhana on 25 March morning hours. Rumor spread in the city after dusk that Yahia Khan had left and Awami League volunteers put up makeshift barricades in the streets, but these did not cause any significant delay to Pakistani troop movements. The volunteers manning the barricades were the first civilians to be shot by Pakistani troops. Although the operation was to start at 0110 hours, Pakistani troops moved out at 11:30 pm from Dhaka cantonment as the Pakistani field commander wished to cut the reaction time of the Bengali forces. The army was given a 6-hour deadline to achieve its goal in Dhaka. Pakistan Army troops quickly shut off all communication channels in Dhaka before commencing the operation.

The 10th Bengal was easily disarmed in the cantonment and later eliminated. The 31st Field was deployed in the second capital of Dhaka city itself and secured the northern part of the city. The commandos, accompanied by Major Belal and Lt. Col. Z.A. Khan easily captured Sheikh Mujibur Rahman at the beginning of the crackdown, but most of the Awami League senior leadership managed to evade capture and escape to India.

22nd Baluch at the EPR HQ attacked and subdued the disorganised resistance of the EPR after an all night battle. Pakistanis captured the EPR troops posted at Mirpur, the President House and the Governor House without resistance, but many managed to flee while others were executed.

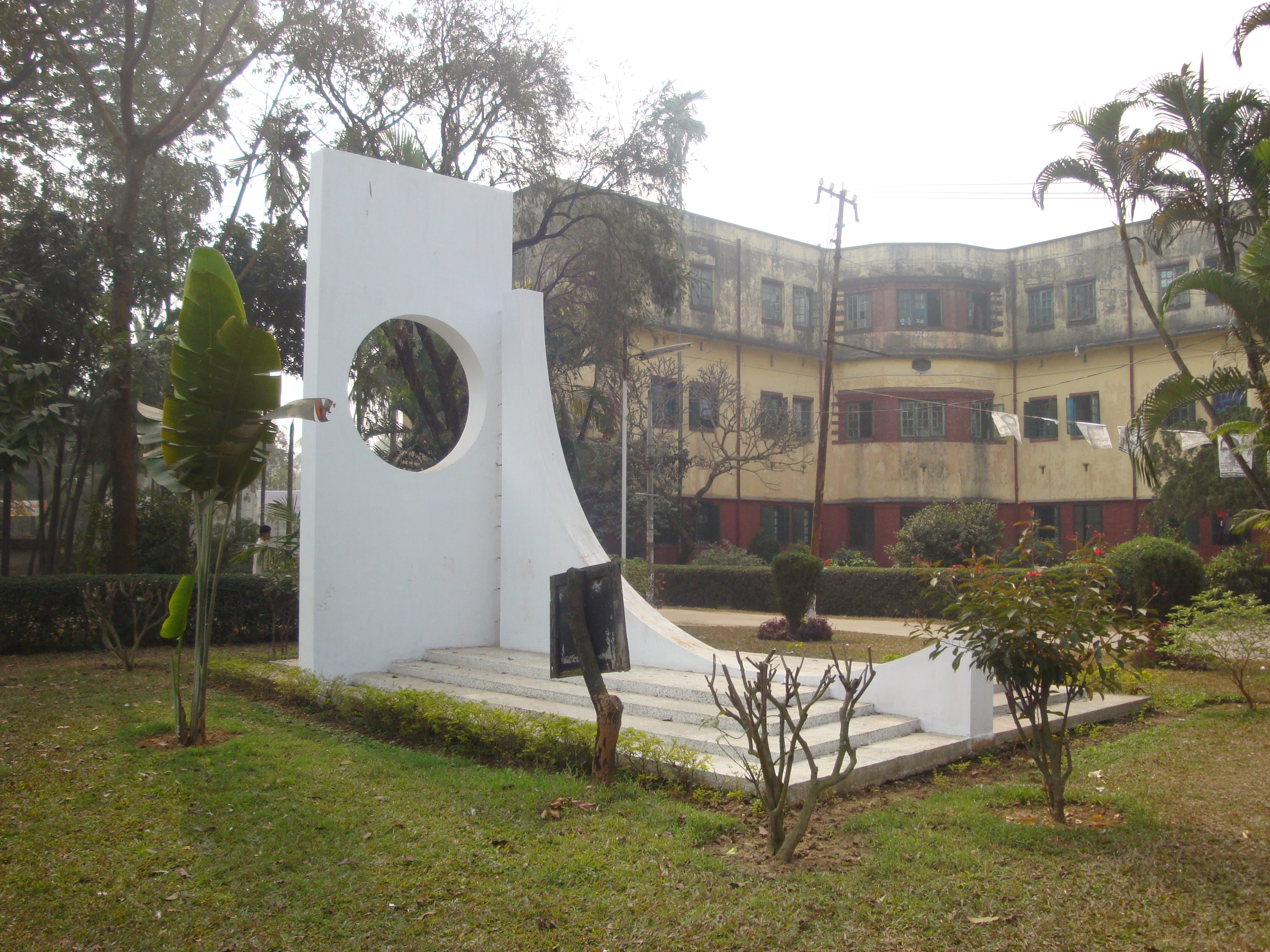
Grave of the 1971 martyrs, in front of Jagannath Hall, Dhaka University.

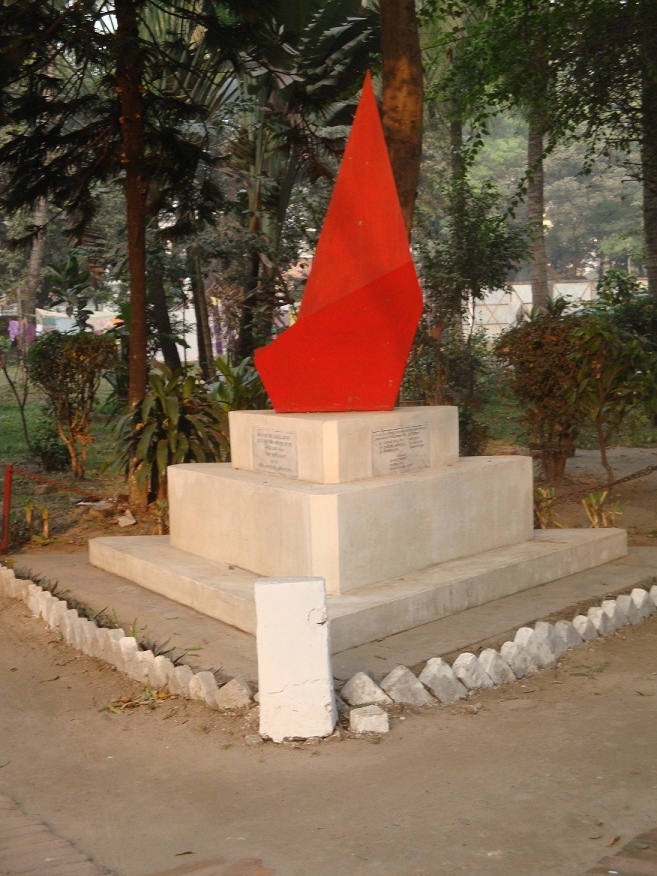
Memorial in front of university staff quarters apartment building at 34, Secretariat Road, Dhaka

Contingents from the 18th and 32nd Punjab regiments surrounded and assaulted the Dhaka University area, subdued the light resistance from the Awami League volunteers, killed over a hundred unarmed students present in the resident halls, murdered 10 professors, then moved on to attack the Hindu areas and the old town on the morning of 26 March. The Police at Rajarbag, aided by Awami League volunteers, put up a fierce resistance, but were eventually overcome and most survivors were captured or scattered.

Pakistani forces had used artillery and armour liberally, disregarding civilian safety altogether during the operation. The city was secured before dawn and a curfew was imposed. Surviving EPR and police fled the city, some crossed the Buriganga river to gather at Jingira. Sporadic attacks on the Army took place during 26 March – 5 April, but barring the failure to arrest Awami League leaders, the Army had achieved its objectives. Pakistani soldiers had also destroyed the Shaheed Minar, offices of The Daily Ittefaq, Daily People and the Kali temple at Ramna, none of which had any military value.

Captured Bengali soldiers, EPR and police personnel were either summarily executed or imprisoned without trial. From 26 March to 6 April, in an operation dubbed "GREAT FLY-IN" PIA Boeings and C 130 Transports would fly the 9th (made of the 27th, 313ed and 117th Brigades) and 16th (34th and 205th Brigades) divisions (a total of 5 Brigade HQs, containing 16 infantry battalions) to Dhaka, and elements of these formations would be flown to various locations in East Pakistan to reinforce Pakistani garrisons.

Two mortar batteries and two wings each of EPCAF and West Pakistan Rangers, accompanied by a considerable number of Tochi and Thal Scouts were also deployed. PAF No. 6 Squadron had 9 C-130B/E Hercules Aircraft available in March 1971. 5 C-130B and 1 C-130E were employed to transfer troops from West to East Pakistan under Operation Great Fly-In. After 25 March, two C-130B planes were stationed in Dhaka. PIA fleet had 7 Boeing 707 and 4 Boeing 720 planes, 75% of PIA transport capacity was also used to ferry troops from West Pakistan.

Pakistan Army lifted the curfew for 2 hours on 27 March, when thousands of civilians left Dhaka for the countryside. Pakistani troops began to move out of the city after 26 March, taking up positions at Demra to the east, Tongi to the north and Narayangaung to the south to block road access to the city. By 10 April, Pakistani Army had taken over the area between the Padma River to the south and Tangail-Narshindi to the north.

==== Mymensingh-Joydebpur ====
The 2nd EBR was posted in Joydebpur to the north of Dhaka, Pakistani planners had feared that this unit could launch attacks on Dhaka Cantonment and disrupt the operation during the early hours of 25/26 March, when Dhaka garrison had no reserve forces to spare. Although Lt. Col. Masoudul Hossain Khan had informed Maj. K M Shafiullah of the Pakistani crackdown on 26 March via telephone, the unit did not take any action until 27 March. Pakistani troops took control of the Rajendrapur factory on 26 March and began to replenish munitions from that depot.

EPR 2nd wing (4 companies, one in Mymenshing, while other were posted to the north at Naqshi, Karaitoli and Lengura) was HQed at Mymenshing, along with a company of 2 EBR and a mixed company of W. Pakistani soldiers. The Pakistani unit attacked the EPR company on 27 March but was wiped out on 28 March, while other 2nd Wing companies neutralised Pakistani soldiers (either arrested them and sent them across the border or killed them) and deployed in towns to the east and west of Mymensingh by 29 March.

The 2nd EBR, under Major Shafiullah, revolted on 28 March, and regrouped at Mymensingh on 29 March. Shafiullah initially deployed his forces at Tangail, Bahadurabad, Sirajgaung, and Gaffargaon by 31 March, intending to launch an attack on Dhaka.

Shafiullah cancelled this plan on 31 March and joined the forces of Khaled Mosharraf north of Comilla with the 2nd EBR troops. Shafiullah deployed his forces as follows: 1 company each at Narshindi, Ashuganj, Ajabpur, Brahmanbaria, Sarail, Taliapara, 2 EBR HQ at Teliapara, and 1 company sent to Shadipur in Sylhet, and 1 to Chittagong to help Major Zia.

Pakistani forces (27th Brigade) moved north from Dhaka on 1 April, one column headed for Tangail while the other for Narshindi. EPR forces ambushed them near Tangail, but Pakistanis broke through despite heavy casualties and Tangail fell on 9 April. Two columns headed north from Tangail, one towards Jamalpur and the other towards Mymensingh. Despite being repeatedly ambushed by Bengali forces, Jamalpur fell on 14 April and Mymensingh by 22 April.

PAF bombed Narshindi on 6 April, dispursing the EPR forces, and the army column (31st Baluch) attacked EPR positions near Narshindi on 8 April. This was repulsed, but the next attack, aided by artillery and Saber jets, broke through on 9 April and Narshindi fell on 12 April. Mopping up action was conducted by the 27th Brigade, which secured Mymensingh, Sylhet and part of Comilla division by June.

=== Chittagong ===
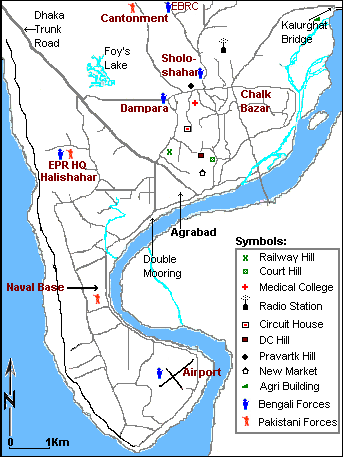
Operation Searchlight: The location of Pakistani targets in Chittagong on 25 March 1971. Map is not to exact scale.

Chittagong housed the only oil refinery in East Pakistan, had a large fuel depot, was the largest seaport and MV Swat, with 9000 tons of arms and ammunition was in port. Bengali units substantially outnumbered the West Pakistani Chittagong garrison, which was a cause of concern for Pakistani planners. Bengali officers of EPR and EBR had discussed a preemptive strike on Pakistan forces, but the senior Bengali officers (Lt. Col M.R. Choudhury -Chief Instructor, EBRC) and Major Ziaur Rahman (2IC, 8 EBR), dissuaded Captain Rafiq (Sector Adjutant, EPR) from rebelling in the belief that the Pakistani army would not take action against civilians, but confirmed that they would revolt in case of any Pakistani attack. Attempts to unload arms and ammunition from MV Swat were a partial failure during 20–25 March, as civilian protestors blocked any attempt to take the arms to the cantonment and many were shot by the army. Brig. Mazumdar was relieved of his post because of this failure.

Pakistani units were given the following objectives in Chittagong:

- Disarm EBRC units, 8 EBR, EPR and police units
- Seize police armoury, radio station and telephone exchange
- Liaise with Pakistani Navy
- Arrest Lt. Col. M.R. Choudhury and Awami League leaders.

The Chittagong garrison was to be reinforced by the bulk of 53rd Brigade troops from Comilla on 26 March.

Pakistani forces: The Chittagong cantonment is located to the north of the city, while the Naval base was near the airport on the south end of the city. The port facilities are positioned between the airport and the naval base. The 20th Baluch regiment (CO: Lt. Col. Fatami-Pakistani), minus its advance party, was the only army unit present in the cantonment besides a company from the 31st Punjab and elements from the 3rd Commando battalion. These were supported by a section of 6 M24 Chaffee tanks from the 29 Cavalry. 20 Baluch had 400 troops, 29th Cavalry had 100 soldiers, while another 100 troops were attached with various service units. Some plain cloths Commandos were in the city

The Pakistani Navy (under Commodore Mumtaz) had 300 troops and the PAF had an unknown number of personnel at the naval base and at the airport respectively. Also, some commandos were operating in civilian clothing in the city. EPR had about 300 Pakistani troops in Chittagong EPR HQ. PNS Jahangir, a destroyer, and the gunboat PNS Rajshahi and PNS Balaghat was also present in Chittagong. Brig. Ansari took command of the port area, while Lt. Col Fatami looked after the cantonment.

Bengali forces: The East Bengal Regimental Center (EBRC – Commanded by Lt. Col. Shaigri- Pakistani), located in the cantonment housed 2,000 Bengali troops, including the newly raised 9th EBR. The 8th EBR (CO: Lt. Col. Rashid Janjua, Pakistani) was at 50% strength and stationed outside the cantonment. EPR Sector #6 was HQed in Chittagong (CO: Lt. Col. Abdul Aziz Sheikh – W. Pakistani) contained the 11th (5 companies, CO Major Md. Iqbal, W. Pakistani), 14th (4 companies, CO Major Shamsuddin Ahmed, Bengali) and the 17th wings(4 companies, CO Major Peer Mohammad, W. Pakistani).

The sector HQ was at Halishahar south of the cantonment, where a company from each wing in addition to HQ company, nearly 600 Bengali and 300 Pakistani troops were billeted. Other 14th Wing companies were deployed at Ramgarh, Taindong and Sajek, to the north and east of Chittagong. 17th wing had 2 companies at Kaptai and 1 at Rangamati. 11th Wing had a company each at Cox's Bazar, Teknaf, Barkal and Maislong areas. The Dampara police line housed a substantial police contingent. A company of Bengali troops were deployed to unload munitions from the MV Swat at the port, while an EPR platoon guarded the airport.

Course of events:

==== 24-25 March ====
The daytime witnessed nothing unusual, Pakistani and Bengali troops continued normal activities, while civilians barricaded streets to impede army movements. 1 Company of Bengali soldiers unloaded the MV Swat, all day and night, which would be finished by 26 March midday. Pakistani navy secured the airport just after dusk, capturing all EPR personnel stationed there. Commodore Mumtaj prevented any massacre of Bengali Naval personnel at the naval base but also ensured they caused no mischief. The port facility was secured by a Pakistani infantry company by 9:00 PM. Communication networks were partially shutdown.

On 24 March, around 8:30 PM, Captain Rafiq was informed of troop movements in Dhaka by Chittagong Awami League leader Dr. Zafar. He immediately went to the EPR HQ and successfully took control of the facility by 10:30, imprisoning about 300 Pakistani EPR members, then sent a prearranged signal to all Bengali EPR companies attached to the Chittagong EPR sector to imprison all Pakistani soldiers and come to the city. This is the only instance where Bengali units launched a preemptive strike against the Pakistanis during the operation. Captain Rafiq deployed his troops in Agrabad (100 soldiers), Railway Hill (150) and Court hill (a platoon). The rest guarded the EPR HQ. The EPR Ramgarh contingent was told to blow up the Shuvopur bridge. As per his discussions with Lt. Col. M.R. Choudhury and Major Zia, he had assumed they would take over the cantonment – an assumption that would have fatal consequences.

20 Baluch, under Lt. Col Fatami, sent 6 truck loaded with troops to secure EBRC around 11:30 pm. Rafiqul-Islam (1981) claimed that they killed a thousand Bengali troops, but this is highly unlikely because Fatimi's unit only had six hundred soldiers who were anyway being phased out, and no other source including pro-Bengali sources such as Samir Bhattacharya (2013, p. 729) corroborate this claim; he puts the West Pakistani strength at six hundred and the Bengali soldiers' strength at five thousand soldiers, a ratio of over eight to one. However, Lt Col. M.R. Choudhury was among those killed by the West Pakistanis, while surviving Bengali personnel were scattered. Pakistani forces had partially achieved their objectives by securing the cantonment, the port and the airport, and they awaited reinforcements from Comilla before taking further steps.

Bengali officers were divided in their opinion, some wanted to take on the 20 Baluch at EBRC to save Bengali lives, but ultimately it was decided that such a move would be suicidal. 8 EBR left the city and took position across the Kalurghat bridge around 1:15 am. 8 EBR CO, Lt. Col. Janjua was killed by his second in command Major Ziaur Rahman.

Pakistani troops from the Naval base launched an unsuccessful attack on the EPR HQ in the early hours (2:00 am – 4:00 am) of 26 March. Around 4:00 March 26, Major Bahar (CO 53rd Brigade Signal Company -Bengali), warned Captain Rafiq of 80 to 100 vehicles bearing the bulk of 53rd Brigade troops under Brig. Iqbal Shaffi was moving towards Chittagong. Captain Rafiq sent an EPR Machine gun platoon under Subadar Musa, with a mortar and rocket launcher to delay the Pakistani column near Kumira, 12 miles north of Chittagong.

M. R. Siddiqui (Awami League leader) had phoned Captain Haroon (2IC 17th EPR Wing) in Kaptai around 9:40 pm about the situation in Chittagong. By 11:30 pm Captain Haroon had taken control of the wing, put Pakistani personnel in jail, and had signalled EPR troops in border areas to move to Chittagong by 3:30 am. Captain Haroon with his troops reached Kalurghat Bridge by 26 March morning, where Major Zia ordered him to stay with the 8 EBR troops, along with 2 EPR companies coming from Teknaf Rangamati EPR Company imprisoned their Pakistani members and took position to the north east of cantonment by the early hours of 26 March. Bengali plan of resistance had fallen apart, EPR troops were to remain without the expected reinforcements throughout the battle.

==== 26 March ====
53rd Brigade detachment had moved out around 3:00 am from Comilla, but was repeatedly faced delays on the way because of barricades, damaged culverts and other obstacles thrown up by civilians during their 100-mile journey to Chittagong, forcing them to stop and make makeshift repairs and diversion roads before moving on. They captured the partially damaged Suvapor Bridge intact around 10:00 am then stopped to make repairs. Brig. Shaffi was ordered to make for Chittagong, so he resumed his advance with the infantry, commando troops and some mortars after midday, when his engineers put up a path across the ravine, leaving his engineers and mortar battery at Shuvopur. By 7 pm, 26 March, this group had reached Kumira (Comeera), by which time Captain S.A. Bhuyan (after talking with Captain Rafiq over phone) of EBRC had reinforced the EPR Platoon at Kumira with 70 soldiers, and had divided his forces in 3 platoons to set up an ambush.

20 Baluch with some tanks had secured the area immediately around the cantonment in the morning. During the day Pakistani troops from naval base and EPR soldiers had several clashes inside the city, especially around the Agrabad area and the Railway hill resulting in Pakistani soldiers being bottled up in the naval base. Bengali positions in the city came under shellfire from Pakistani Naval ships and artillery, while Bengali troops at the port facility were disarmed around midday and shot before dusk. Around 2:30 pm local Awami League leader M. A. Hannan made a declaration of Independence on behalf of Sheikh Mujibur Rahman from the Kalurghat Radio station, which was not picked up by many people.

Around 7 pm, Brig. Shaffi's troops were ambushed near Kumira, losing 10 killed, and suffering almost 100 casualties, including Lt. Col. Shahpur Khan (CO 24 FF). Brig. Shaffi himself had to flee for the hills, and 2 truck full of arms were recovered by the Bengalis. Half the convoy was outside the ambush firing range and Pakistanis, commanded by Major Amzad Hussain (Bengali −2IC 24 FF) fought back, and a 2-hour long battle ensued. The mortars were handled by Captain Fazlur Rahman Bhuyan (Bengali), who ironically was a Kakul Academy batch mate of Captain S.A. Bhuyan, leading the Bengali ambush. The Pakistani column lost all contact with Comilla and the GHQ at Dhaka, raising fears that it had been wiped out, which, if true, might have crippled the Pakistani effort.

The EPR HQ and Railway hill came under intense bombardment by Pakistani naval ships (PNS Jahangir and 2 gunboats) and artillery during the day. Pakistani troops launched two attacks on the Railway hill and EPR HQ after a 2-hour barrage around 8:30 pm, but both attacks were repulsed. Pakistanis continued to shell both areas throughout the night.

At the end of 26 March, both Pakistani and Bengali troops had been denied land based reinforcements. Pakistani troops were stuck at Kumira, while Major Zia was keeping any EPR troops heading to the city at Kalurghat. Pakistani troops were in control of the northern and southern part of the city, and they were getting reinforcements through the air. The 2nd SSG (CO: Lt. Col Sulayman) was flown to Chittagong, while ammunition was flown out to replenish Pakistani forces around the province. Bengali troops were stuck in the middle (literally and figuratively) so the lack of communication and co-ordination between Maj. Zia and Captain Rafiq meant Bengali positions would come under intense pressure. Major Zia apportioned his troops to different parts of Chittagong city for various operations. From the Kalurghat radio station he broadcast declaration of independence of Bangladesh with himself as the provisional head of state in the evening.

The next day he broadcast again, amending the declaration to say it was on behalf of Sheikh Mujibur Rahman. The impact of this broadcast, which was picked up by the civilians and isolated Bengali units fighting the Pakistanis, was significant. EPR troops from Ramgarh could not reach the city as Pakistanis stuck at Kumira barred their way, and the troops from Rangamati were stuck outside the cantonment. The Bengali soldiers in the city were in dire need of supplies and reinforcements.

==== 27 March ====
Captain Rafiq and EPR troops withdrew from the Railway Hill position, and planning to join the EPR troops on the north of the cantonment before sunrise. Captain Rafiq planned to attack the cantonment and take over the supply dumps, but his troops moving towards the cantonment were taken to Kalurghat by Maj Zia en route, scuttling this risky plan. Pakistani troops from the naval base moved through Agrabad towards the EPR HQ, but EPR troops managed to beat back the attack.

General Khadim, GOC East Pakistan flew to Chittagong cantonment in the morning and conferred with Col. Fatami, then tried to locate Brig. Shaffi's troops flying along the Comilla-Chittagong highway by helicopter. The helicopter was hit by small arms fire near Kumira, and returned to Dhaka without making contact. Gen Khadim moved his HQ from Dhaka to Chittagong cantonment next, and sent a column of 20 Baluch to locate the 53rd Brigade troops, but this column clashed with the EPR troops north of the city and got bogged down. General Mitha arrived in Chittagong around midday via Helicopter and planned to send a commando platoon from 2 SSG under Lt. Col Sulayman to link up with 20 Baluch before going on to locate Shaffi. The platoon raced north from the naval base in 2 jeeps and 3 pick-up trucks, but were ambushed near Double Mooring, losing 13 members including the CO.

Meanwhile, Shaffi had regrouped his forces at Kumira, and the Pakistani soldiers from Shuvopur had joined him after leaving a rearguard on the bridge. He sent a column east to bypass the Bengali position and linkup with the 20 Baluch, but it was ambushed and forced to withdraw. Another column moving along the seashore was also ambushed, and some Pakistani soldiers lost their way and were killed by Bengali mobs. Bengali civilians had provided warnings which were crucial for setting up the ambushes.

The EPR troops at Kumira were almost out of ammunition and fell back 5 miles south to Bhatiari. Captain Bhuyan left for the city to get supplies, but could not return to Kumira. Captain Rafiq finally managed to re-supply the troops, but it took 7 long hours. Later that day Capt. Rafiq left for Ramgarh to seek Indian assistance. In the meantime, EPR troops took control of Feni, thus cutting off the road link between Comilla and Brig. Shaffi. EPR troops at Ramgarh split in two groups, one moved to join the Bengali soldiers near the Chittagong cantonment, while the others made for Shuvopur.

At the Chittagong naval base Brig. Ansari formed a task force of 2 tanks, one infantry battalion and mortars to hold the port area, supported by the 2 SSG commandos and naval ships. He was later reinforced by another battalion flown from Dhaka. Pakistanis made another attack on the EPR HQ without success later in the day. Gen. Mitha planned to send another commando platoon to blow up the station, but the fate of the first platoon convinced him to send this in speedboats instead of overland.

EPR troops attempted to capture the Shuvopur bridge without success. Pakistani troops had failed to take control of Chittagong as planned, but they had access to airborne reinforcements and no lack of supplies, while Bengali troops were running out of supplies, needed reinforcements and the lack of co-ordination between Zia and Rafiq meant their effort were not fully effective. By 27 March, most Bengali troops outside Chittagong city had assembled near the Kalurghat bridge under Zia's command and they went for some quick operations in the city against the Pakistani forces.

==== 28 March ====
Pakistani forces at Kumira launched a 3 pronged attack on Bengali forces in the morning, supported by mortars and PNS Rajshahi and Balaghat from the sea. The attack broke through and surviving EPR troops retreated to Fauzdarhut, where they were joined by an EPR platoon. Brig. Shaffi soon began attacking the area around 8 am. After a clash of 3 hours, Bengali troops fell back to a position near the Haji Camp, which soon came under attack from Brig. Shaffi's troops.

The Pakistani commando platoon sent to blow up Kalurghat Radio station was cornered in the Agri Building near the river and wiped out. Gen. Khadim then ordered the 20 Baluch to attack the station, which was repulsed. 20 Baluch also unsuccessfully attempted to dislodge the EPR troops positioned to the north of the cantonment around midday. Pakistani troops managed to push south from the cantonment and take control of the Circuit house (this became the HQ for Gen. Khadim). Pakistani ships and artillery continued pummel Bengali positions, but Pakistani attempts from the naval base to drive the EPR from Agrabad and link up with the 20 Baluch failed, although 20 Baluch and Brig. Shaffi's group made contact with each other later in the day.

Captain Bhuyan, who was posted at Kalurghat Radio station by Major Zia, made two Radio announcements. The first one was to observe a blackout, the second was for all Bengali armed forces personnel to gather at Laldighi Moydan. Realizing the danger from the PAF in an open air gathering, the second announcement was cancelled, which was mainly given to gather scattered Bengali troops in the city. For a time the Pakistan troops retreated and shut themselves in their fortifications. According to Major Zia, the battle in Chittagong city was fierce. EPR troops from Ramgarh, now commanded by Maj. Shamsuddin (CO 14th EPR Wing) attacked the Pakistani guard on Shuvopur bridge in the evening, wiping out the Pakistani contingent and capturing the bridge.

==== 29 March ====
Brig. Ansari sent a Pakistani detachment from the naval base bypassing EPR positions at Agrabad and captured New market and DC hill in the morning, but they were repulsed at Court Hill. Brig. Shaffi, who had taken control of the Haji camp and linked up with the 20 Baluch, now pushed south to the edge of Agrabad and made contact with Brig. Ansari's detachment around evening, much to the relief of Pakistani HQ in Dhaka then captured the Medical college and Pravartak hill as well.

Bengali troops fell back to Halishahar. The initiative now fully rested with the Pakistan forces after 4 days of bitter fighting.

==== 30 March ====
Brig. Ansari began organising a task force to clear the city, while Brig. Shaffi took overall command with the task of taking out the Radio station, EPR HQ and the Dampara police line immediately. While Pakistan Navy and army shelled the Bengali positions, Gen. Mitha again sent a commando platoon to attack Kalurghat Radio Station, which failed. 20 Baluch next attacked towards the station but was repulsed after heavy fighting.

Finally the PAF bombed the station, and the transmitters were removed to another location by Bengali personnel. Sporadic clashes took place around the EPR HQ, while Major Zia left Maj. Shawkat in command at Kalurghat Bridge and left for Ramgarh around 7:30 pm to seek Indian assistance.

==== 31 March ====
Brig. Ansari launched a battalion sized attack on the EPR HQ at Halishahar (a strongly fortified area), supported by another battalion and 2 tanks, with PNS Babur and Jahangir and 2 gunboats, plus a mortar battery lending fire support. The buildings at the HQ were levelled by shellfire – inadvertently leading to the death of Pakistani POWs. The battle raged from 7 am to 2 pm, and when the attack stalled around midday, PAF jets bombed the area, and another 3 hours were needed before the base was secured. Bengali survivors fled north through by lanes and left the city altogether.

==== Aftermath ====
Brig. Ansari next attacked the Dampara police line on 31 March with his task force which fell after a sharp firefight. On 1 April the Pakistani attack on Court hill was repulsed with the loss of a tank. Brig. Ansari launched an attack with 2 companies on 2 April, which got stalled. He then sent 4 companies from two directions at Court hill, and captured the place, leaving Bengali troops with control of Chawlkbazar only in Chittagong city. For his services the superseded Brig. Ansari was awarded the Hilal-i-Jurat and the rank of Major General.

Between 3–6 April, Pakistani troops carried out mop up operations and fought several sharp street battles in and around Chawlkbazar, and by 10 April they had secured the city. Captain Rafiq and Maj. Zia had secured aid from BSF by 6 April, and were busy organising Bengali forces around Ramgarh. Bengali troops had captured 18 Pakistani officers near Ramgarh including Lt. Col Sheikh and Major Iqbal, all of whom surrendered to the Indian authorities.

Major Shafiullah and Major Khaled Musharraf sent 1 company each to Ramgarh in aid to 8 EBR, while Maj. Zia was busy attending them at Teliapara conference. All Bengali troops had left the city to regroup in 2 areas, at Kalurghat (1,000+ Bengali troops of the EPR and EBR), and at Kumira to the north of the city. By 10 April, Pakistani troops were poised to launch a three pronged coordinated attack to drive the Bengali troops from their positions.

=== Comilla ===
Comilla is on the strategically important Dhaka-Chittagong Highway and a crucial road link. Pakistani objectives were:

- Disarm 4 EBR, EPR and police
- Secure town, telephone exchange and arrest Awami League leaders

Pakistani forces: 53rd brigade (CO: Brig. Iqbal Shaffi-W. Pakistani) was situated at Mainamati cantonment 5 miles from Comilla city. The 24th Frontier Force (CO Lt Col. Shahpur Khan – W. Pakistani), 3rd Commando Battalion (CO: Lt. Col. Z.A. Khan – W. Pakistani) and the 53rd Field Regiment (CO – Lt. Col. Yakub Malik), along with the 88th and 171st mortar (120mm) batteries, the brigade signal company (CO Major Bahar – Bengali), 40th Field Ambulance (CO: Lt. Col. A.N.M Jahangir – Bengali), Brigade workshop and Field intelligence unit was situated in the base. 31st Punjab was in Sylhet while the Chittagong area troops (20 Baluch, 8 EBR) were detached from the brigade and placed under the command of Brig. Mozumdar in mid March.

Bengali forces: EPR Wing No. 1 (4 companies, CO Major Karab Ali-West Pakistani), part of EPR Sylhet sector was HQed at Courtbari near Comilla city with its companies deployed at the HQ, at Akhaura, Nayanpur in Comilla district and at Parshuran near Belonia in Noakhali District. There were no Bengali officers attached to this wing.

2 companies of the 4th EBR (Lt. Col. Khijir Hayat – Pakistani) was at Brahmanbaria, 50 miles north of Comilla, one under the command of Major Shafat Jamil. Another company under Major Khaled Mosharraf was sent to Shamshernagar in Sylhet on 25 March. Col. Hayat left the EBR rear party at Comilla and joined the rest of his troops at Brahmanbaria on 25 March, and ordered Shaffat Jamil to move to Shahbazpur with his company, where he remained until being recalled on 26 March evening back to Brahmanbaria.

Course of Events: Pakistani plan was to have one 31 Punjab company ambush Maj. Khaled's detachment as it moved to Shamshernagar while another company neutralised the remainder of the 4 EBR at Brahmanbaria. The plan was foiled because Maj. Khaled took an alternative route to Shamshernagar, thus avoiding the ambush, and the other company was delayed because of barricades on the road. Major Shafat learned of the Pakistani crackdown on 26 March morning from people fleeing Dhaka and managed to warn Major Khaled, who ordered Jamil to remain vigilant until Khaled arrived in Brahmanbari to lead the revolt. An unknown person warned Major Jamil of the approach of the 31st Punjab detachment on 27 March early hours, and Major Jamil managed to arrest all Pakistani personnel prior to the scheduled 10:00 PM meeting. Major Khaled arrived later that day and deployed his troops to the north and east of Comilla.

The Pakistanis easily arrested and imprisoned or executed Bengali troops in Comilla cantonment, then wiped out the police in Comilla city on 26 March. The EPR HQ wing was warned of the attack and most EPR personnel managed to escape. A convoy of 80 to 100 vehicles bearing the 24th Frontier Force, the mortar batteries, commando troops and the engineers started for Chittagong after Comilla was secured. An engineering company had been sent to Feni on 25 March to secure the road. This column was ambushed by the EPR 12 miles from Chittagong on 26 March evening. The 3rd Commando battalion attacked and eliminated the 4th EBR rear party in the cantonment on 29 March.

Nearly 1000+ Bengali soldiers and their families, including doctors posted at the CMH, were killed on the orders of Lt. Col. Malik by 30 March in Comilla. Pakistanis maintained control of the city and the airfield throughout the operation. By 10 April, Bengali troops still controlled major cities in Comilla, Noakhali and Sylhet. Pakistani 27th, 313th, and 117th Brigades were attacking these positions. Comilla was reinforced by helibourne troops from 2 April, but their efforts to break-out from the city were foiled by Bengali fighters. The first major success of the Pakistani Comilla contingent came on 19 April, when Akhaura fell to them.[Unknown]

=== Sylhet ===
Pakistani objectives were:

- Secure Radio station and exchange
- Secure Kean bridge and airport
- Disarm EPR and police, arrest Awami league leaders

Pakistani forces: 31st Punjab battalion (CO: Lt Col. Yakub-Pakistani) posted in Sylhet was attached to the 53rd Brigade in Comilla. EPR Sector #2 was HQed in Sylhet (CO: Lt. Col. Sekendar Khan – W. Pakistani) and contained some W. Pakistani personnel. 2 companies from 31 Punjab had been sent to neutralise the 4 EBR, one company was at Shamshernagar, presumably to ambush the 4th Bengal company under Khaled Mosharraf, and another was at Maulavibazar, presumably moving to Brahmanbaria to subdue the rest of 4th Bengal. These companies were delayed en route by barricades thrown up on the roads by Bengalies. The remnant of 31st Punjab was in Sylhet.

Bengali forces EPR Sector #2 in Sylhet (CO: Sekendar Khan –W. Pakistani) contained 3 wings, the 1st, 3rd and 12th and only 1 Bengali officer. The 1st wing (4 companies) was HQed at Courtbari near Comilla. EPR 3rd wing (4 companies, CO Maj. Javad Barkat Chowdhury – W. Pakistani) was HQed in Sylhet city, and its companies were deployed in Sylhet and along the border to the north of the city. 12th Wing (3 companies, CO Maj. Shawkat Hayat Khan – W. Pakistani) was HQed in Khadimnagar (north of Sylhet city and between the city and Salitukar airfield) and its companies were deployed to the east of Sylhet.

Course of events: Pakistani troops took over Sylhet city on 26 March without resistance, while Bengali EPR troops from 3rd wing and EPR Sector HQ managed to escape capture because Major Javed Barkat aided them. 31st Punjab companies sent to neutralise 4 EBR took up platoon size defensive position at Sherpur, Sadipur and Shamshernagar after being foiled by the 4 EBR revolt in Brahmanbaria. EPR 12th wing troops began to gather at Sunamganj while 3rd wing troops began taking over the BOPs after learning of the Pakistani crackdown from 27 March onward.

==== Initial clashes ====
An EPR company attacked Samshernagar on 27 March and drove back the Pakistani platoon towards Sylhet. Another EPR company attacked 2 Pakistani platoons at Maulvi Bazar on 27 March and occupied the town. EPR troops also repulsed a Pakistani platoon sized attacked on Sunamganj on 29 March, while remaining 12th wing companies imprisoned W. Pakistani personnel of the wing and joined the resistance, some joining Major CR Dutta in Habiganj while others joined Maj. Khaled Musharraf near Comilla. A 31st Punjab company attacked and captured Shamshernagar on 31 March early morning with PAF assistance from the EPR forces. Some EPR troops took up position at Khadimnagar by 31 March.

==== Bengali resistance solidifies ====
Major C. R. Dutta with the aid of Lt. Col. (ret) M. A. Rab had gathered at Habiganj a mixed force of EPR, Ansars and volunteers totalling 2 companies. This force moved to Maulvibazar and started advancing on Sylhet in early April. On 4 April EPR troops from Sunamganj attacked Pakistanis in Sylhet with inconclusive results. While the Pakistanis began to reinforce Salutikar airfield, Major Dutta advanced on Sherpur on 4 April, crossed the river at night with civilian assistance, and launched a 3 pronged attack on Pakistani forces on 5 April around 5 am. After a 7-hour firefight surviving Pakistanis fell back to Sadipur.

Major Shafiullah had sent a 2nd EBR company (CO Captain Aziz) to aid Major Dutta. While Major Dutta advanced north along the Sylhet-Comilla highway, Capt. Aziz took an easterly route towards Sylhet. On 6 April, he arrived within 3 miles of Sylhet, and after a sharp fight with some Pakistani troops, managed to take control of the south side of Surma river.

By this time Major Dutta had driven the Pakistanis from Sadipur to Sylhet and joined Capt. Aziz on 7 April, augmenting his forces to 4 infantry companies. Captain Aziz took position on the southern end of Keane Bridge in Sylhet city, cutting off-road access to areas south of the Surma river. Pakistanis evacuated Sylhet city on 7 April and took up defence around Salutikar Airfield.

EPR companies from Sunamgaj entered Sylhet on the same day. An attack on the airport by EPR troops on 8 April was unsuccessful, after which 1 EPR company reinforced the troops at Khadimnagar.

Reinforced through air by 2 infantry battalions and a mortar battery (possibly the 22 Baluch, 30 Frontier Force and the 81st Ind. Mortar Battery) of the 313st brigade, a Pakistani column attacked Khadimnagar on 9 April night, and by 3:00 am drove out the Bengali troops, who retreated to Haripur. Another detachment attacked Sylhet city and occupied the area after a 4-hour struggle. Pakistani planes bombed Keane bridge around 2:00 pm 10 April, then launched a 3 prong attack on the bridge, outflanked the position by crossing the river both upstream and downstream, and by dusk Captain Aziz retreated south to Sadipur. Aside from sporadic fighting, no major clashes took place near Sylhet until 18 April.

=== Jessore ===
Pakistani army Jessore contingent were given the following objectives:

- Disarm 1st EBR, EPR sector HQ and police
- Secure town, telephone exchange and arrest Awami League leaders
- Maintain control of cantonment and airfield
- Reinforce Khulna if required.

Pakistani forces: The 107th Brigade HQ was in Jessore. It had the 26th Baluch regiment, the 27th Baluch regiment minus a company, elements of the 22nd Frontier Force, the 55th Field Artillery Regiment and elements of the 24th Field Artillery Regiment and various support and supply formations attached to the brigade.

Bengali forces: The 1st EBR (Lt. Col. Rezaul Jalil – Bengali) was in winter training away from the cantonment. The unit was at 50% strength, as it was preparing to move to West Pakistan. Other than support and supply troops in the cantonment, there were armed police in the city. EPR sector HQ was located nearby. 7th Field ambulance was in the cantonment. EPR sector HQ troops and a platoon from EPR 5th wing was in the city.

Course of events: Pakistani soldiers entered Jessore city around 11:30 pm on 25 March, took up positions on several locations and began patrolling the city. A few shots were exchanged near the EPR HQ but no major clash took place that night. ERP Bengali troops took up arms and began patrolling inside the HQ. Sector CO Lt. Col Aslam requested Bengali troops to stand down on 26 March, assuring them that he would stand with them in case of an army attack, and Bengali troops reluctantly surrendered some of their weapons around midday. Major Osman (CO EPR 4 Wing at Chuadanga) tried to contact Bengali officers of the wing on 26 March but the officers refused to talk to him. The situation in Jessore remained calm until 30 March.

From January 1971 1st EBR was training at Chaugacha (13 miles west of Jessore) near the Indian border and was unaware of the events taking place around the country. This unit was scheduled to relocate to West Pakistan and 50% of its troops were on pre-embarkation leave. On 27 and 28 March Major Osman had requested Col. Jalil to join the resistance but he had refused and warned Major Osman not to bother him further. On 28 March 1 EBR was ordered to Jessore and they reached the cantonment on 29 March, 4:00 pm.

7th Field Ambulance soldiers requested 1 EBR troops not to deposit their arms to the armoury, but this request was disregarded. Around 8:00 am on 30 March Brig. Durrani himself came to 1 EBR barracks and ordered all arms to be surrendered and took away the keys of the armoury. Bengali soldiers then revolted, broke arms out of the kotes and began firing at the nearby Baluch barracks around 9:00 am. The EBR line immediately came under mortar and automatic weapons fire from entrenched Pakistani soldiers from 3 sides.

Lt. Col Jalil refused to join his soldiers. On his orders, about 50 Bengali soldiers surrendered to the Pakistanis, and, despite Jalil's promise of pardons, were shot as traitors. Lt. Hafiz and Lt. Anwar took command of the Bengali troops and led the firefight until 4:30 pm, when Bengali soldiers began an orderly retreat from the cantonment in small groups after losing nearly half the unit present strength and leaving their families behind.

Lt. Hafiz managed to regroup his surviving troops 11 miles west of the cantonment around 8:30 pm. The retreat was carried out through heavy interdiction fire and majority of the surviving troops made it, except Lt. Anwar, who was shot while leading a group out, and 40 soldiers. 7th Field Ambulance troops also revolted and were wiped out. Pakistanis killed several Bengali soldiers and their family members, including doctors at the CMH (including Lt. Col. S.A. Hai), and the surviving Bengali families were interned for their safety.

EPR troops received news of the cantonment clash and readied their defences by 9:30 am on 30 March. All Pakistani personnel were imprisoned, but the Bengali officers left the HQ after the revolt started, leaving command to the JCOs. The city police also joined the revolt and began attacking army positions all around the city, while arms kept in government installations were distributed among civilian volunteers. EPR troops ambushed a Pakistani convoy coming from Khulna on 30 March evening, despite suffering heavy losses, surviving Pakistani troops managed to reach Jessore cantonment.

A confused battle erupted around the city, and on 31 March 3 companies from the EPR 5th Wing cut off the Jessore – Khulna highway link. Pakistani troops abandoned the city and withdrew to the cantonment on 31 March, to the anger of Pakistan Army Eastern HQ. 2 EPR companies coming from Chuadanga got stuck just east of the city and failed to arrive. However, Bengali fighters managed to take up positions with 6 miles of the cantonment and began shelling Pakistani outposts with 3 inch mortars.

Pakistani reinforcements began arriving from Dhaka via C-130 planes and helicopters from 2 April. Jessore Airfield was inside the cantonment area and Pakistani troops maintained control of both throughout the operation. A Pakistani column moved towards Kushtia, but was ambushed on 3 April and driven back, although Pakistanis took up positions in the Bihari colony in the city suburbs the same day. The Pakistanis made several unsuccessful attempts on 5 April to move towards Jhenida.

On 6 April, the Pakistan army simultaneously attacked all Bengali position near Jessore and recaptured the city. A Pakistani column moving towards Jhenida was ambushed and driven back on 7 April. Bengali troops regrouped at Narail and moved towards Jessore, but were scattered by Pakistani air attacks on 9 April.

On 11 April several Pakistani army columns left Jessore, one heading for Jhenida, one towards Khulna, and one towards Benapol. Pakistani 57th Brigade crossed over from Rajshahi and began attacking Kushtia. By the last week of April, Bengali resistance had been driven across the border by the converging attacks of the 57th and 10th brigade.

=== Khulna ===
Pakistan army Khulna detachment had the following objectives:

- Secure town, Telephone exchange and Radio Station.
- Disarm EPR Wing HQ and police line
- Arrest Awami League and Communist leaders.

Pakistani forces: The 22nd Frontier Force regiment (75% strength-CO Lt. Col. Shams) was posted in Khulna, attached to the 107th brigade. Non Bengali EPR troops from EPR 5 wing.

Bengali forces: 5th EPR wing (4 companies) was HQed at Khulna. The Wing did not have any Bengali officers attached to it. One company was posted in Khulna itself, while the others were posted at Satkhira, Kaliganj and Kalaroa, to the south-east and north-west of Khulna. 2 platoons were posted in the sector HQ at Jessore. There were a number of police in the city as well.

Course of events: Pakistani forces maintained their positions throughout the operation, and had arrested the Bengali EPR personnel in Khulna on 25 March. Some of the political leaders had also been arrested. There were sporadic clashes in the city, but by 28 March, Khulna was under firm Pakistani control. A Pakistani troop column from Jessore had reached the city after brushing aside two clumsy ambushes by a mixed force of volunteers and police on 28 March. Operation Searchlight had anticipated Jessore garrison reinforcing Khulna, but ironically the Khulna detachment was requested to provide reinforcements for Jessore.

==== 28 March – 10 April: Khulna cut off ====
EPR forces outside the city learned of the crackdown on 26 March and revolted. Many of the captured EPR personnel managed to escape from Khulna and joined their compatriots. One company from Kaliganj joined the EPR 4 wing, while the other 3 took positions on the Khulna – Jessore highway. EPR troops ambushed a Pakistani column heading for Jessore on 30 March, a few individuals managed to reach Jessore. On 4 April, Bengali fighters from Barisal launched an unsuccessful attack on the Khulna Radio station located outside the city. Khulna garrison remained isolated until the end of April.

=== Kushtia ===
Pakistani objectives were to secure the town, establish a presence and take control of the telephone exchange.

Pakistani forces: A company from the 27th Baluch.

Bengali forces: EPR 4 wing (5 companies, CO Major Abu Osman Chowdhury – Bengali), part of EPR sector No. 3, was HQed at Chuadanga, about 10 miles west of Kushtia. It had 1 company in the HQ, while others were posted to the west at Pryagpur, Bodyanathtala, Dhopkhali and Jadobpur on the border. Kushtia police line housed a substantial police contingent. This wing had the full complement of anti tank weapons and mortars in addition to the usual infantry weapons. Police and Bengali volunteers also joined the EPR after the Pakistani crackdown.

Course of events: 27th Baluch company moved to Kushtia, which is about 54 miles north from Jessore and sits on the Rajshahi – Jessore highway, around 11:30 pm on 25 March in 13 vehicles from Jessore cantonment. They first took control of the Police lines and disarmed 500 police personnel. The CO then spread out his forces and set up outposts at the Town Police HQ, VHF Radio Station, Telephone exchange and District school, and disabled the phone and telegraph lines. By 26 March 6 am a curfew imposed and the town was calm for the next 48 hours. Some of the police managed to escape on 28 March and join the EPR at Chuadanga.

==== Bengali resistance forms up ====
Major Abu Osman Chowdhury managed to escape from Kushtia on 26 March and reached Chuadanga via Jhenida. The EPR wing had learned of the crackdown through the EPR wireless net and had imprisoned all W. Pakistani personnel by this time. Major Osman met with political leaders, government officials and at 2:30 pm raised the Bangladesh flag at EPR HQ – signalling the start of revolt. The other companies were alerted via radio and they began to set up roadblocks on the roads around Kushtia.

Pakistani troops from Jessore made probing attacks near the border from Jessore but did not push on after meeting resistance near Courtchadpur on 27 March. All EPR troops at the border were ordered to Chuadanga on the same day, while Major Osman sent a letter to Lt. Col. Jalil (CO 1 EBR – Bengali), then at Chaugacha with his battalion, informing him of the Pakistani crackdown and requesting him to take command. He sent a messenger to Col. Jalil the following day, Col Jalil dismissed his suggestion as insane babbling and warned not to bother him again.

All EPR companies assembled at Chuadanga on 28 March. Major Osman had gathered a force containing 600 EPR troops and 400 mixed volunteers, and deployed to attack Kushtia. A mixed group of 200 troops were kept at Kushtia, another similar group under Jhenida SDP Mahbubuddin took position near Kaliganj south of Jhenida. 2 EPR Platoons were sent to Courtchandpur while a company was posted at Jhenida. Captain AR Chowdhury led a company directly from Chuadanga to Kushtia, while another company advanced from Pryagpur towards Kushtia.

==== Assault on Kushtia ====
Major Shoaib was warned of the coming Bengali attack by the local police but his forces failed to take it seriously, they did not bother to entrench themselves. Captain Chowdhury planned to attack Kushtia from 3 directions. An EPR company was to attack the District force from the south-east, while another struck the radio station from the east. The main group, reinforced by 2 mixed companies, would attack the Police line.

About 5,000 civilians were to raise as much noise as possible to confuse the Pakistanis. Bengali forces began shelling Pakistani positions and skirmishing around 3:45 pm on 29 March. Around 4:00 am on 30 March the Bengalis struck all Pakistani positions simultaneously after a mortar barrage, preventing the Pakistanis from reinforcing each other.

The force attacking the police line took over an adjacent three-storey building and sprayed the Pakistanis with bullets, a Pakistani troop section tried to hit the building with Recoilless rifles around 1:30 pm but were cut down. Around 5 pm Pakistani survivors retreated to the company HQ after losing 20 men. Pakistanis at the Radio station and Telephone exchange also retreated to the company HQ at the District School. Bengali assault on the school was repulsed and sporadic fighting continued throughout the night. Major Shoaib had requested reinforcements and air support via Radio from Jessore, both requests were denied.

Pakistani forces held out the following day, then 65 survivors tried to escape in a 3-ton truck, one dodge and 6 jeeps after dusk. This convoy was ambushed 25 kilometres south of Kushtia, losing 2 jeeps and the dodge. The survivors scattered in the countryside, Bengali mobs killed all but 2 Pakistani soldiers. Lt. Ataullah Shah and another were rescued by the EPR, given medical treatment and surrendered to the Indian authorities. Kusthia would remain under Bengali control until 16 April.

=== Rajshahi ===
The objectives allocated for the Pakistani garrison in Rajshahi were:

- Disarm police and EPR Sector HQ
- Secure Radio station and telephone exchange
- Arrest Awami League leaders and secure University/Medical college

Pakistani forces: The 25th Punjab regiment (CO: Lt. Col. Shafqat Baluch) minus 1 company, attached to the 23rd brigade. Pakistani EPR troops from EPR sector HQ.

Bengali forces: EPR sector no 4 was HQed in Rahshaji and contained no Bengali officers, and about a company of EPR troops were at the sector HQ in Rajshahi. EPR wing no 6 (4 companies, HQ Nawabganj to the west of Rajshahi) and No 7 Wing (5 companies, HQ Naogaon, CO: Nazmul Huq – Bengali) was attached to the Rajshshi sector. No. 6 Wing had no Bengali officers and its companies were at the Wing HQ, and on the Indian border at Charghat, Godagari and Mankosha.

No. 7 wing companies were at the Wing HQ and on the Indian border between Panchbibi and Rohanpur. Police and Bengali volunteers were also present in Rajshahi. Pakistani officers had posted non Bengali personnel at the Sector HQ kotes and communication centre during the second week of March.

Course of events: The CO of 25 Punjab, Lt. Col. S. Baluch was away and joined his unit on 25 March. As per the plan, he sent a company to Pabna, a town to the east of Rajshahi sitting on the vital road link to Dhaka, on the same day to establish Pakistani presence. Pakistan troops began patrolling Rajshahi from 25 March, and the situation was normal, if tense the following day. Bengali police had dug bunkers expecting an attack, but nothing happened. EPR 6 Wing troops at Nawabgaung did not face anything unusual during 25–26 March.

The situation at Naogaon was different. Bengali troops at Rohanpur had clashed with Pakistani troops on 23 March, and on 26 March soldiers at Naogaon revolted after receiving news of the countrywide Pakistani crackdown. The Bengali troops managed to imprison all Pakistani personnel while they were at dinner. Major Nazmul Huq joined his troops and began assembling the wing companies at Naogaon.

==== Situation explodes: 27 March ====
25th Punjab took defensive positions near the Rajshshi police line and EPR HQ on 27 March. Although a truce was negotiated between the police and Pakistani army, an attack was launched on the police lines after 12:00 PM, which fell after a 3-hour battle. Rajshahi police had contacted the EPR at Naogaon prior to the Pakistani attack, but received no help as EPR troops could not cover the 60 mile distance in time. But as the news of this Pakistani attack alerted the Bengali EPR soldiers, and they began to take measures.

Pakistani EPR troops relocated to the cantonment the same day with most of the arms from the sector HQ, while some took position at the circuit house. Warned by the non Bengali sector adjutant Captain Ishaq, some Bengali EPR troops revolted, armed themselves, and sporadic clashes took place after dark which led to nothing. Bengali EPR personnel left Rajshahi the following day. The situation during 28 March – 2 April was uneventful except for thousands of civilians leaving the city to escape Pakistani retribution and prosecution.

Pakistani EPR troops suddenly attacked Bengali troops at Nawabgaung on the same day, but were forced to surrender after a 3-hour battle. The 6 wing soldiers contacted Major Nazmul Huq at Naogaon and also joined the revolt.

==== Escalation of hostilities: 28–29 March ====
The 25 Punjab company in Pabna was deployed in small detachments around the town. A mixed force of Bengali EPR, police and volunteers attacked the company on 27 March, and which caused casualties on both sides (including the company CO Captain Asghar and Lt. Rashid, 3 JCOs and 80 Pakistani troops). After a botched Heli evacuation attempt, Major Aslam led 2 platoons from Rajshahi to Pabna on 28 March and extricated the survivors. This column was ambushed near Ishwardi on 29 March by a Bengali force under Captain Rashid, lost 40 soldiers including Major Aslam, and only 18 soldiers ultimately reached Rajshahi after 3 days.

The 23rd Field company in Bogra was deployed in 2 groups, one guarding the ammunition dump while the other patrolling the town without incident during 25–29 March. Attempts to reinforce this group from Rangpur had not succeeded. A Bengali EPR company under Captain Gias moved to Bogra, 35 miles from Naogaun on 28 March morning, reaching the place in the evening. With the aid of 200 armed police and several hundred civilian volunteers, a Pakistani patrol was ambushed on 29 March, and surviving Pakistanis fled to Rangpur. Captain Gias left Bogra the following day. Local Bengali fighters attacked the ammunition dump on 1 April, put surviving Pakistani troops in jail and freed the town.

==== Ring around Rajshahi ====
After securing Pabna and Bogra, Major Nazmul Huq focused on Rajshahi, around which Bengali fighters had been gathering since 28 March. After keeping a small reserve at Naogaon, Major Nazmul Huq concentrated a mixed force of EPR, Police and volunteers around Rajshahi by 1 April. Captain Gias commanded a mixed force of almost 1,000 fighters from Nawabgaung while Captain Rashid led another 1,000 from Panba to Rajshahi. Sporadic clashes with Pakistanis started on the following day.

A three pronged attack was launched on the town, with Captain Gias attacking from the south, Captain Rashid from the east and another group from the northwest on 4 April. After a fierce 4 hour battle causing severe casualties on both sides, Pakistani forces left the town and took up a strong defensive position around the cantonment at Sapura, using minefields and barbed wire to beef up the place. Between 1–5 April, the PAF had launched airstrikes to little effect on Rajshahi. Bengali fighters launched several attacks on the cantonment between 6–10 April, and although the Pakistanis were ultimately confined in an area only 800 yards square, the Punjab regiment managed to survive.

Rajshahi town remained free until 15 April. On 10 April 3 EPR companies took position to block the Pakistani 57th infantry brigade at Nagarbari. Pakistani forces softened the position by airstrikes on 10 April, a launch borne forced probed it the following day. At night Pakistani assault force crossed the Jamuna River and secured the position, forcing the battered remnants of Bengali fighters to flee towards Pabna. Brig. Arbab began cleaving a path of terror and destruction as he headed for Rajshahi with the 57th brigade.

=== Rangpur-Saidpur ===
Pakistani Army objectives for Rangpur were:

- Secure both towns, Telephone exchange and Radio station in Rangpur.
- Diasarm 3 EBR at Saidpur and EPR Sector HQ at Dinajpur
- Secure Ammo dump at Bogra
- Arrest Awami League leaders in Rangpur

Pakistani forces: The 23rd brigade (CO Brig. Abdullah Malik Khan – W. Pakistani) was HQed at Rangpur. 23 Field Artillery regiment (CO Lt. Col. Shaffi -Pakistani) and the 26th Frontier Force (CO Lt Col. Hakeem A. Qureshi – Pakistani) was at Saidpur. A company from the 23rd Field was in Bogra and another company from the 26th FF was based at the Dinajpur Circuit house. 29th Cavalry (55 tanks, 50% Bengali personnel, CO Lt Col. Sagir Hissain Syed- Pakistani), the only tank regiment in East Pakistan was at Rangpur, along with the brigade signals, engineers and the 10th Field Ambulance (CO Lt. Col. Masud – W. Pakistani). The 25th Punjab was at Rajshahi.

Bengali forces: 3 EBR (CO Lt. Col Fazal Karim- Pakistani) was at Saidpur. 2 of its companies (CO Major Nizam – Bengali) were posted at Ghoraghat and one (CO Captain Shafat Hossain – Pakistani) was at Parvatipur. EPR sector no 5 (CO Lt. Col. Tareq R. Qureshi – Pakistani) was HQed at Dinajpur. This sector contained the EPR wing no 8 (5 companies, HQ Dinajpur, CO Major Amin Tareq – W. Pakistani), EPR 9 Wing (5 companies, HQ Thakurgaon, CO Major Sawar Muhammad Hussain) and EPR Wing 10 (5 companies, HQ Rangpur, CO Major Md. Kazmi – W. Pakistani).

EPR 8 wing had 2 companies at Dinajpur and the rest was deployed near the border at Biral and Basudevpur. EPR 0 wing companies were deployed at Thakurgaon, Ruhia, Chilahati, Tetulia and Panchagarh. EPR 10 wing companies were posted at Rangpur, Chilamari, Patgram, Mogolhat and Joymonirhut. Rangpur and Saidpur also had some armed police in the city. 29th Cavalry had 50% Bengali personnel.

Course of events: As part of a pre arranged plan 3 EBR companies had been posted away from Saidpur to minimise their threat, and its anti tank weapons were given to the 26 FF company in Dinajpur for training purposes, further diminishing its firepower. 26 FF planned to disarm the EPR troops at Dinajpur during a Bara Khana on 23 March, which failed because Bengali troops protested the presence of armed Pakistani soldiers in the dinner area and refused to eat until the Pakistani contingent put away their arms before sitting down to eat.

Pakistani troops moved into Rangpur on 25 March around 12:00 am and took up positions around the city. Capt. Nawajesh had barely escaped from the EPR HQ with some men, but the Pakistanis neutralised the police and remaining EPR troops easily. Pakistani troops also took control of Saidpur without any resistance.

The situation in Dinajpur, Thakurgaon and Saidpur remained calm. Pakistani troops from 23rd Field and 29th Cavalry began regular patrolling in Rangpur from 26 March onward, aided by local non-Bengali police members. On 27 March a group of Bengali civilians, armed with spears and such tried to enter Rangpur cantonment and were mown down by automatic fire, their bodies were burnt.

Captain Ashraf, after persuading 3 EBR 21C Major Akthar of his desire to stay loyal to Pakistan, was sent to Thakurgaon with a 3 EBR company from Saidpur on 26 March morning. There were no clashes between Pakistani and Bengali forces although the situation remained tense and some Biharis began looting Bengali property at Saidpur. At Thakurgaon the EPR troops did not react to the martial law declaration. The following morning EPR troops entrenched themselves at the wing HQ.

There were civil demonstrations at Thakurgaon during 26–27 March, and Pakistani troops fired at the crowds causing some casualties. Things remained unchanged until 28 March, when EPR companies deployed on the border became aware of the countrywide Pakistani crackdown from radio intercepts, and began to neutralise Pakistani EPR personnel in their midst. Capt. Nawajeshuddin met with EPR company commanders of the 10th wing and decided to take control of the Tista bridge, thus cutting off all territory north of the Tista river from Pakistani control on 28 March.

On 28 March around 11:30 am a rumour spread among EPR troops in Dinajpur that they might be attacked, and clash with the 26th FF company erupted around 3:00 pm. The combatants began shelling each other with anti tank weapons and mortars and began exchanging fire from entrenched positions at their respective HQs. EPR troops posted in the city rushed to the EPR HQ, the police also joined the EPR troops, while Bengali EPR officers were captured by Pakistani troops and Pakistani EPR personnel and officers joined the 26th FF.

The battle raged throughout the night and continued for the next 3 days. An EPR company took up position at Phulbari on 29 March while the other companies made for Dinajpur, including some EPR 10 Wing troops from Rangpur. EPR troops at Phulbari fought a series of battles on 29 and 30 March, and managed to retain their position. A group of Pakistani EPR troops retreating towards Saidpur were also ambushed on 29 March, leading to the death of 2 Pakistani officers but Pakistani survivors managed to reach Saidpur.

As the situation grew serious for the Pakistani troops at Dinajpur, a detachment from the 26th FF (CO Captain Fida H. Shah) was sent to Dinajpur. They ran afoul some Bengali EPR en route but managed to reach the city by nightfall. Unable to linkup with the Pakistani detachment at Dinajpur, this column resumed their advance the following morning, advanced slowly through the town. By this time Brig. A.K. Malik had decided to evacuate Dinajpur, but a communication mix up prevented a concerted action between the two groups.

The beleaguered Pakistani troops left the town using one avenue while Capt. Fida's group raced to the Pakistani base to find it empty and fought their way out. The retreat was disorganised and some Pakistani troops were killed in an ambush en route. EPR troops freed the captured Bengali officers. By 31 March Dinajpur was in Bengali hands.

Thakurgaon EPR troops learned of the Dinajpur clash on 28 March evening, and attacked the Pakistani EPR troops around 10:30 pm that night. The Pakistanis, however, were prepared and a firefight raged throughout the night and the following day around a 3-story building housing the Pakistani personnel. 9th Wing EPR companies at the border were requested to come to Thakurgaon via Radio on 29 March, while the police joined the EPR. On 30 March the Pakistani troops at Thakurgaon were wiped out. EPR companies from the border arrived the following day.

Lt. Col. Hakeem was almost ambushed while leading a detachment towards Bogra at Palasbari on 30 March (or 28 March, according to other sources) around 1:30 pm by a 3 EBR platoon and some EPR troops. Col. Hakeem fortunately managed to avoid the trap by calling out Lt. Rafiquddin Sarkar, 3 EBR platoon leader and keeping him in his jeep before opening fire, and returned to Saidpur after a firefight erupted. Lt. Rafiq was executed by Pakistanis later. Brig. Malik decided to disarm the 3 EBR and 29 Cavalry Bengali personnel on the same day.

==== Disarming Bengali soldiers ====
29 cavalry Bengali troops were divided into small groups for patrolling on 28 March, and their return was staggered from Rangpur. Pakistani troops first disarmed Bengali guards at Rangpur cantonment, then each Bengali patrol group was surrounded by waiting Pakistani soldiers on their return and disarmed. Bengali officers and soldiers of 23rd Field and 29 cavalry were neutralised this way and most were executed.

3 EBR companies were at Parvatipur (CO Maj. S. Shaffat Hussain – Pakistani), Thakurgaon (CO Captain Ashraf – Bengali), Ghoraghat (2 companies, CO Maj. Nizamuddin – Bengali) and Saidpur (Rear party and HQ company, OC Capt. Anwar). 3 EBR companies conducted routine work during 26–28 March, when the news on Pakistani attacks on Bengalis caused all except the one in Saidpur to revolt. Bengali troops at Ghoraghta were the first to react by setting up the failed ambush under Lt. Rafiq at Palashbari on 28 March. Other EBR companies stayed in their positions until 31 March.

26 FF attacked the 3 EBR barracks on 30 March (1 April, 3:00 am, according to other sources) with 23rd Field regiment guns providing fire support. Captain Fida was killed at the beginning of the battle, and the surviving EBR was finally forced to retreat after a bloody firefight that took a heavy toll on both sides. The initial attack on the Bengali positions was launched from the north, the second from the north west, while small groups of Pakistani troops infiltrated the positions to take out defensive strong points.

After a few hours, surviving Bengali troops decided to retreat and left their position in 2 groups, having suffered 55 casualties out of 120 soldiers. Families were left behind and after some Pakistani soldiers abused them (including raping the wives of officers), they were moved to the Saidpur and Rangpur jail. Several Bengali officers attached to the 23rd Brigade were executed while several Bengali officers were sent to West Pakistan.

==== Securing the air-link ====
EPR 10th wing troops had taken control of the Tista bridge on 28 March, and had deployed 2 companies near the bridge, 1 at Lalmanirhat airfield and the other 2 at Kurigram and Mogolhut. No clashes with Pakistani troops took place until 1 April.

Helicopters began ferrying 48 Punjab and 4 FF troops began to Rangpur after the disarming of Bengali troops. On 1 April a 4 FF platoon probed the area around Tista Bridge, and in the ensuing clash Maj. Ejaj was killed. The following day an infantry company with 29 cavalry reconnaissance troops moved to the bridge. They directed artillery on the Bengali position and with the aid of air strikes and tanks managed to force the Bengalis to fall back slightly by evening.

Another Pakistani column moved north and crossed the river at a different point and attacked and captured Lalmunirhat airfield. The outflanked EPR troops abandoned the bridge, and by 4 April the airport was fully operational, with troops and supplies being flown in and families flown out. Apart from small hit and run attacks, Pakistani position remained secured north of the Tista river. On 11 April around 3:30 am 4 EPR companies attacked the airfield, but Pakistani resistance forced them to break off the attack at daybreak.

==== Bengali deployment around Saidpur 1 April ====
EPR troops at Thakurgaon began to take up positions north of Saidpur from 31 March. On 2 April, Bengali officers and EPR JCOs of 8 and 9 wings decided to deploy troops around Saidpur. Thakurgaon EPR contingent moved to Nilphamari to the north of Saidpur, Bhushibandar to the west of it. Small contingents were deployed in areas in between these two positions. Pakistani troops moved to Parvatipur, south of Saidpur after 3 EBR company had gone south to Phulbaria on 2 April.

On 4 April Bengali commanders held another near Bhatgaon and decided to attack Saidpur, after which 1 EBR and 3 EPR companies (CO captain Ashraf) dug in at Bhushibandar, another EPR company (CO Capt. Anwar) went to Badarganj (west of Parvatipur), and another company stayed at Bhatgaon. 3 EBR companies attacked Parvatipur on the same day, the Pakistani troops and armed Biharis retreated to Saidpur. The significance of the deployment of the Bengali forces in the west, south and north of Saidpur in a semicircle, with the road east to Rangpur open, was not lost to the Pakistani commanders.

==== Pakistani counterattack from Rangpur/Saidpur ====
Bengali troops lacked proper communication equipment for co-ordinating an attack on Saidpur and although Indian authorities had been contacted for help, none had been received. Pakistani troops, reinforced through the air after the capture of Lalmunirhut, began to attack Bengali positions from 6 April onwards. Task forces were created from the 26 FF, 48 Punjab and 4 FF battalions, accompanied by a squadron/troop from the 29 cavalry and artillery pieces from the 23rd Field regiment, several Pakistani infantry columns backed by air support begun to attack Bengali positions simultaneously from 4 April.

Bhushibandar was taken on 5 April, Parvatipur was taken on 6 April, Nilphamari was unsuccessfully attacked the same day. 3 EBR troops attacking Parvatipur from Phulbai on the same day met with bloody repulse and retreated to Phulbari. Pakistani troops attacked Nilphamari on 7 April, Bengali troops left the town the same day and Pakistanis took the town the following day.

By 10 April, Pakistani troops were poised to attack Bengali positions at T-Junction to the west of Bhushibandar, and areas to the west of Nilphamari and south of Parvatipur. By 27 April the division was secured, and the area north of the Tista river was retaken by Mid May. But in securing the division, 26 FF, the same regiment that had the maximum casualties later on till surrender of Pakistan Army, lost a very valuable resource on 1 May.

Capt. Mujahid who was at the flank along with three soldiers and his CO, Lt Col Hakeem was attacked by the 3rd EBR. The attack put the team of five in a defensive mode and cross firing started. Capt. Mujahid died after being shot through the heart.

== Aftermath ==
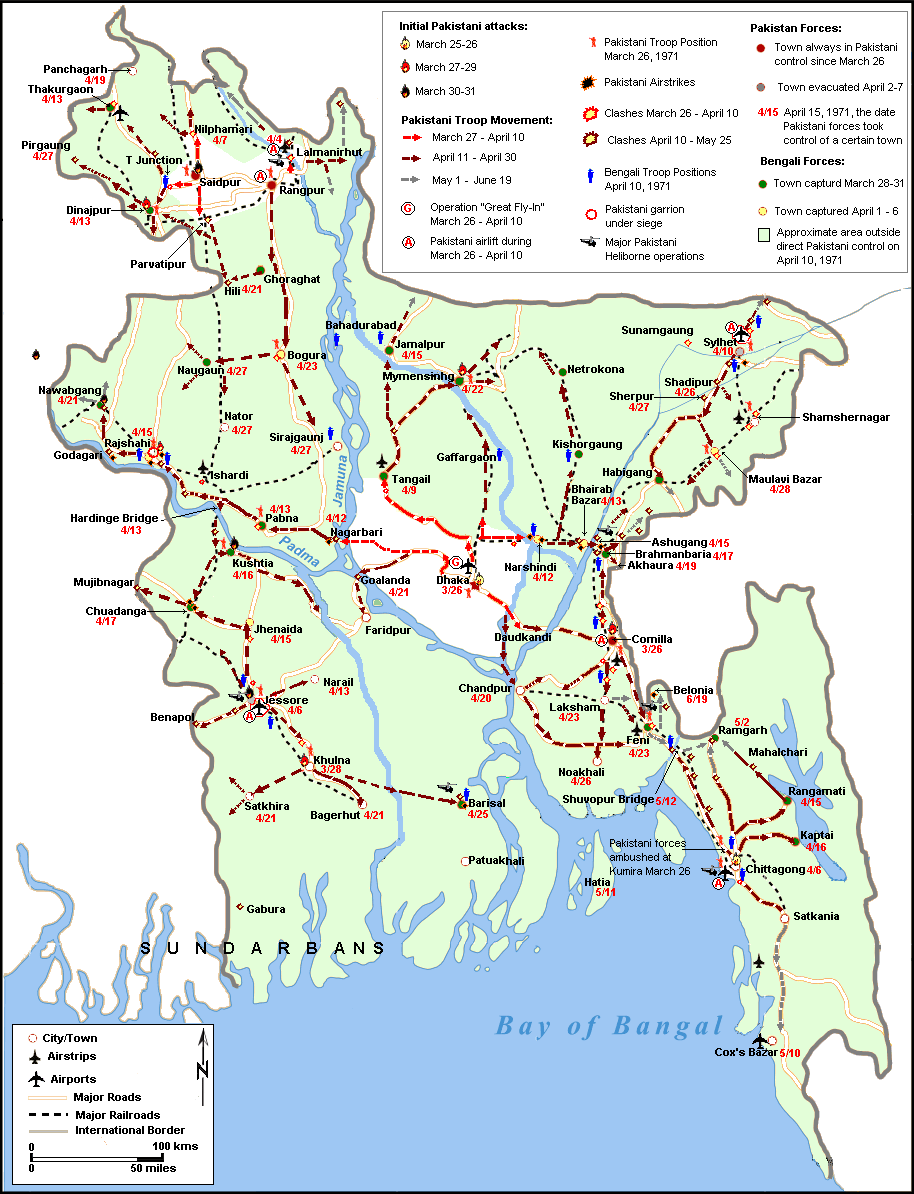
Operation Searchlight: Pakistan army operation 10 April – 19 June. Not to exact scale and some troop movements/location are indicative only.

By the dawn of 10 April, Pakistani forces had gained control of Dhaka, Rangpur-Saidpur, Comilla, Chittagong, and Khulna. Their forces had lost or abandoned Rajshahi, Sylhet, Pabna, Dinajpur, Mymenshing and Kushtia. The vital airfields and all the cantonments remained under Pakistani control, while the rest of the province was unoccupied and outside government control.

The Bengali resistance had put up an unexpected stiff resistance and had managed to derail the initial Pakistani estimate of pacifying East Pakistan by 10 April. The initial successes were not sustainable as the Bengali forces began to suffer from lack of trained men, officers, co-ordination among scattered troops and lack of central command structure, proper supplies (despite limited aid from BSF).

The Pakistani army had airlifted the 9th and 16th infantry division to Bangladesh by 10 April and was poised to seize the initiative. Gen. Niazi, who took command of Pakistan forces in Bangladesh on 11 April, obtained a brief from Gen. Raja (the departing GOC) and implemented the following strategy:

- Clear all the big cities of insurgents and secure Chittagong.
- Take control and open all river, highway and rail communication network.
- Drive the insurgents away from the interior of the country
- Launch combing operations across Bangladesh to wipe out the insurgent network.

Against this strategy Bengali field commanders opted to go with "holding as much area for as long as possible", The Bengali leadership hoped to keep the Pakistanis confined into the cities, while the Bangladesh government in exile sought diplomatic recognition and the resistance prepared for eventual guerrilla warfare and awaited the expected Indian military intervention.

Lacking everything except unskilled volunteers, Mukti Bahini fought a conventional battle against an enemy enjoying superiority in number of trained men, firepower, and complete air superiority and played to the strength of Pakistanis. Choosing to attack Bengali forces all over Bangladesh simultaneously, Gen. Niazi concentrated battalion and brigade size forces on company and battalion size defence positions repeatedly, used air strikes and artillery to soften targets, and employed Heli-borne troops to outflank positions and hammered through to reach chosen objectives. Pakistani troop convoys were repeatedly ambushed, but these only delayed the Pakistani advance temporarily.

By using their superiority of weapons and command of air ruthlessly, with little regard for safety of civilians and often targeting civilian areas to spread terror, the Pakistani army began to fan out of their bases and take over the province. By late April, all the major cities had fallen, by mid May all major towns had been captured and by mid June the battered remnant of Bengali fighters had been driven across the border into India. The Bengali resistance, suffering from a lack of trained men, proper logistics and co-ordination, lost the conventional battle against the Pakistan forces.

=== Temporary Pakistani occupation ===
Lt. General Amir Abdullah Khan Niazi had been posted as GOC East Pakistan Command on 11 April 1971, while Gen. Tikka Khan was retained as the governor of the province. General Khadim Raja was relieved from the command of the 14th division, and General Farman continued to serve as advisor on civilian affairs to the governor.

The Pakistan Army in East Pakistan, after being reinforced by "Operation GREAT FLYIN", was reorganised to run the counterinsurgency operation. The 9th division (HQ Jessore, Maj. Gen. Shaukat Riza commanding) was given the 57th (HQ in Jhenida) and 107th (HQ in Jessore) brigades for controlling Kushtia, Jessore, Khulna, Faridpur, Barisal and Patuakhali districts. The 16th Division (HQ Natore, Maj. Gen. Nazar Hussain Shah commanding) was given the 23rd (HQ Rangpur), 205th (HQ Bogra) and 34th (HQ Nator) brigades and was to control Dinajpur, Rangpur, Bogra, Pabna and Rajshahi districts. The 14th division (HQ Dhaka, Maj. Gen. Rahim Khan) controlled the rest of the province with the 27th (HQ Mymenshingh), 313th (HQ Sylhet), 117th (HQ Comilla) and the 53rd (HQ Chittagong) brigades.

E.P.C.A.F (East Pakistan Civil Armed Force) was organised to replace the EPR. Commanded by Maj. Gen. Jamshed, this force contained 17 combat wings, 7 sector wings (Sector HQs at Dhaka, Mymeshingh, Jessore, Rajshahi, Dinajpur, Comilla and Chittagong), totalling an estimated 20,000 personnel (West Pakistanies and Biharis), serving under the command of Pakistani army officers. The force was deployed to patrol the border, maintain internal security and support army operations.

Razakars and Shanti Committees were formed to support the army occupation. Mostly recruited from Bengalis and ex-EPR servicemen, an estimated 40,000 Razakers (against a target of 100,000 recruits) of mixed effectiveness was eventually fielded. Al-Badr and Al-Shams, formed by Jaamat-i-Islami, contributed another 5,000 members each. Pakistan also deployed hundreds of West Pakistani civilians and 5,000 police to support the occupation.

Admiral Mohammad Shariff, who was a rear-admiral at that time, and the principal commander of Navy of East Pakistan, released his autobiography, entitled, "Admiral's Diary". In his autobiography, Admiral Shariff provided the account of Operation Searchlight, as he said Shariff concluded, "The initial military success in regaining the law and order situation in East Pakistan in March 1971 was misunderstood as a complete success. In actuality, the law and order situation deteriorated with time, particularly after September of the same year when the population turned increasingly against the army as well as the government".

=== Creation of Mukti Bahini ===
The initial resistance, which started on 26 March, functioned without any central command structure. Senior Bengali army officers met at Teliapara in Sylhet on 10 April, and selected Col. (ret) M. A. G. Osmani as commander of Bengali armed forces. On 11 April Osmani designated four sector commanders: Major Zia for the Chittagong area, Major Khaled Mussarraf for Comilla, Major Shafiullah for Sylhet and Major Abu Osman Chowdhury for Jessore area.

The Bangladesh government in exile was formed by the Awami League leadership on 17 April at Meherpur in Kushtia, which confirmed Col. Osmani as commander of Mukti Bahini (regular armed forces and insurgents) under the authority of Prime Minister Tajuddin Ahmad. Bangladesh Forces Headquarters were set up in Kolkata (Calcutta) with Col. MAG Osmani as commander in chief, Lt. Col. MA Rab as Chief of Staff (based in Agartala, Tripura), and Group Captain AR Khandker as deputy Chief of Staff. The Bengali resistance, after being driven out of Bangladesh, began reorganising to focus on irregular warfare.

=== Bengali refugees in India ===
A few thousand people sought refuge during April and May, mostly the resistance. However, as Pakistani army operations spread throughout the province, refugees fleeing to India increased. Ultimately approximately 10 million people would leave East Pakistan, and about 6.7 million were housed in 825 refugee camps.

An estimated 7.3 million were in West Bengal, and 1.5 million in Tripura. The rest were mainly in Assam and Bihar. The temporary presence of this large foreign population created economic (the cost of feeding, housing and medical care), social (tensions between locals and refugees) and national security (arms falling in the hands of Mizo and Naga rebels) concerns for India.

=== India's role ===
The main reason Generals Farman and Yakub had opposed any military action against civilians in East Pakistan was the fear of an Indian attack, which the Pakistan army was woefully unprepared to meet in March 1971. After the crackdown, Tajuddin Ahmad met with Indian Prime Minister Indira Gandhi on 3 April 1971 and asked for all possible aid, by which time the Indian government had already opened East Pakistan border and the BSF was offering limited aid to the Bengali resistance. The issue of direct military intervention was discussed between the Indian military and political leadership in April 1971. The case for intervention was based on the following:

- Until 10 April, most of Bangladesh was outside Pakistani control, and the troops were bottled up in a few cities and were facing fierce resistance. It is likely the Indian Army, with proper air support, could have quickly taken control of most of the province by aiding the Mukti Bahini.
- Indian Eastern Naval contingent (1 aircraft carrier and several warships) could have imposed a blockade of the province and cut off supplies from the sea, as the Pakistan Naval arm in the east only contained 1 destroyer and 4 gunboats.
- Pakistani forces were flying in crucial reinforcements from West Pakistan during 26 March – 2 May and were dependent of the supply depots located in Dhaka, Chittagong, and Narayanganj for fuel and ammunitions. Most Pakistani garrisons were cut off from each other and reliant on supplies through airlifts. The Indian Air Force, vastly outnumbering the Pakistan Air Force Eastern contingent, could have cut off the air-links and destroyed the supply depots (as it did in December 1971).

Against this, the military leadership had to consider the following:

- Indian army did not have a suitable force available for action in April 1971, and would have to assemble one from forces deployed in other areas for such an operation. Could an adequate force be put in place without jeopardising the security of the northern and western borders of India in time to make a difference in East Pakistan?
- Could a logistical network be established around East Pakistan to support the combat force operation before Pakistani army took over the province?
- Should the Indians fail to gain a quick victory, was the army and the government ready (logistically, politically, diplomatically and otherwise) for a longer war, especially during the monsoon season in Bangladesh which would favour the defenders?
- Intervening in East Pakistan would make India the aggressor in International circles. Was India ready to diplomatically meet the international reaction and had India ensured the co-operation of a superpower as a diplomatic ally and arms supplier, crucial for running a long war?

Although some of the Bengali leadership hoped for and expected an Indian military operation at the earliest, a view also shared by some Indian officers, Indian army eastern command decided in the present condition such a move was inadvisable, and a full attack could only take place after 15 November 1971 at the earliest, only after deliberate and extensive preparations, which was further elaborated to the Indian cabinet by Gen. Sam Manekshaw. Indian leadership decided not to directly intervene, but chose to get involved: Eastern command took over responsibility for East Pakistan operations on 29 April, and on 15 May launched Operation Jackpot, a full-fledged operation to recruit, train, arm, equip, supply and advise the Mukti Bahini fighters engaged in guerrilla warfare against the Pakistan armed forces.

=== Bengali civilian casualties ===
The killings which began on 25 March 1971 and sparked the Bangladesh Liberation War led to the deaths of at least 26,000 people, as admitted by Pakistan (by the Hamoodur Rahman Commission) and as many as 3,000,000 as claimed by Bangladesh (from 1972 to 1975 the first post-war prime minister of Bangladesh, Sheikh Mujibur Rahman, mentioned on several occasions that at least three million died). Biharis and non-Bengalis had also suffered in the initial stages of the conflict – houses were looted and some died in Bengali hands.

Christian Gerlach concluded that overall deaths due to the war in East Pakistan slightly exceeded half a million and could not have exceeded 1 million, adding that the majority of death were rural dwellers who died of "hunger, want, and exhaustion" with many deaths occurring in the year following the conflict. Out of 200,000 member of the Awami League the paper states 17,000 were killed with the leaders of the league experiencing a death ratio of 15 to 20 out of 167. The paper also denies based on statistical evidence that there was a coordinated attempt to exterminate the Bengali intelligentsia stating: "if one accepts the data published by the Bangladesh propaganda ministry, 4.2 per cent of all university professors were killed, along with 1.4 per cent of all college teachers, 0.6 per cent of all secondary and primary school teachers, and 0.6 per cent of all teaching personnel. On the basis of the aforementioned Ministry of Education data, 1.2 per cent of all teaching personnel were killed. This is hardly proof of an extermination campaign."

The genocide also included killing of serving Bengali senior army officers of the rank of Lt. Colonel and above in East Pakistan within the first few days of Operation Searchlight. The deaths included Col. Badiul Alam, Lt. Col. MA Qadir, Lt. Col. S. A. Hai, Lt. Col. M. R. Choudhury, Lt. Col. (Dr.) Abul Fazal Ziaur Rahman, Lt. Col. N. A. M. Jahangir and another dozens of senior majors who were executed by April 1971. Also, around a hundred junior officers and thousands of unfortunate captured Bengali soldiers, including members of the East Pakistan Rifles and Police, serving in East Pakistan were executed. After the defeat of the Pakistan Army, there was a call to try nearly 200 Pakistani POWs for war crimes, but no trials took place.

== Evaluation and importance ==
- The Pakistani army maintained operational security, for the most part, before the operation commenced. They also airlifted 2 infantry divisions (the 9th and the 16th) to Bangladesh in a span of 4 weeks after 26 March, despite a ban on flights over India.
- The disorganised initial resistance of Bengali units was crushed by mid June, and the country was under Pakistani control. As insurgent activity slacked off in July, civilians returned to work and trade resumed, and Pakistanis could claim the country was almost "normal". On the surface, Operation Searchlight had achieved most of its goals. Pakistani military leadership were satisfied with the results, even General Gul Hasan, no admirer of the Pakistani operation in East Pakistan in General and of Gen. Niazi in particular, praised the efforts of Pakistani troops and their achievements in April 1971.
- The capture of Sheikh Mujib might have been a big blow for the resistance had Tajuddin Ahmad failed to rally support for his leadership from the other Awami League senior members and create the Bangladesh government in exile. The Pakistanis failed to capture the Awami League political leaders during the operation, which was a crucial part of the plan. Out of the 167 elected Members of National Assembly and 299 members of Provincial Assembly from Awami League, Pakistinis managed to kill 4, 4 surrendered themselves while 2 were captured. The rest moved to India, and using their networks and popular support in Bangladesh, effectively organised the insurgency and joined the Bangladesh government in Exile in various capacity.
- The survival of the Awami League political apparatus permitted India to channel aid through a structured organisation, rather than dealing with various resistance groups competing for their support. The Awami League included elected members of parliament who claimed to be legitimate representatives of the people, thus enhancing the credibility of the organisation in international circles. Bengali army officers worked under civilian leaders, so there was no serious struggle for power in the resistance. While civilian leadership ran the administration and coordinated logistics, army personnel fought the war and trained freedom fighters.
- Pakistani planners assumed that if the political leadership was captured, the Bengali armed units disarmed, and the civilians sufficiently terrorised, after a month no organised resistance would remain in East Pakistan. Their assumptions were proven wrong in the long run. The political leadership escaped to organise the resistance and lobby for international support, Bengali soldiers formed the core of the armed resistance, and civilians, despite the terror campaign, supported the insurgency with logistics, intelligence and volunteers for the irregular warfare.
- Operation Searchlight included no follow-up plan. Anticipating a relatively quick success, Pakistani planners did not plan for a long irregular war or the eventual involvement of India. Pakistan had no regular troops to spare after stationing 4 divisions in Bangladesh by November 1971 since they needed to maintain parity with the Indian army in the west. With the EPR and police defecting, a large number of paramilitary units were needed to police the country. Siddique Salik estimated that Pakistan needed at least 250,000 to 300,000 troops, but even after organising the Razakars (estimated strength 40,000), Pakistan could field only 150,000 (45,000 regular army, rest paramilitary units) soldiers in Bangladesh.

The eventual strain of combating the insurgency caused Pakistan to attack India on 3 December 1971, with the objective to stop Indian support for the Mukti Bahini. This attack initiated the Indo-Pakistani War of 1971, which concluded with the unconditional surrender of Pakistan forces on 16 December.

== See also ==
- Timeline of the Bangladesh Liberation War
- Military plans of the Bangladesh Liberation War
- Mitro Bahini order of battle
- Pakistan Army order of battle, December 1971
- Evolution of Pakistan Eastern Command plan
- 1971 Bangladesh genocide
- Indo-Pakistani wars and conflicts
- Operation Azm-e-Istehkam
