= Qadirabad Cantonment Public School =

Educational institution in Natore, Bangladesh

Qadirabad Cantonment Public School কাদিরাবাদ ক্যান্টনমেন্ট পাবলিক স্কুল

Location
- Qadirabad Cantonment, Natore, Rajshahi Division; Bangladesh
- Coordinates: 24.2771°N 89.0102°E

Information
- Established: 1928
- School code: 2175
- Chairman: Brigadier General Syeed Ahmed
- Headmaster: Md. Sharif Uddin Khan
- Gender: Male; Female
- Website: www.qcps.edu.bd

Qadirabad Cantonment Public School (Bengali: কাদিরাবাদ ক্যান্টনমেন্ট পাবলিক স্কুল, romanized: Kādirābāda kyānṭanamēnṭa pābalika skula) is an educational institution in Qadirabad Cantonment, Natore, Rajshahi Division, Bangladesh.

== History ==
Qadirabad Cantonment Public School was established in 1928.

In 2018, Qadirabad Cantonment Public School performed best in SSC examination in Bagatipara Upazila, Natore with 99 getting GPA-5 out of 130 students.

In 2022, Qadirabad Cantonment Public School performed best in SSC examination in Bagatipara Upazila, Natore with 129 getting GPA-5 out of 141 students.

== Administration ==
=== Management ===
As of 2025, the chairman is Brigadier General Syeed Ahmed. And the headmaster is Md. Sharif Uddin Khan.

=== Affiliation ===
It is under Board of Intermediate and Secondary Education, Rajshahi. It is run by Qadirabad Cantonment Board.

== EIIN ==
Qadirabad Cantonment Public School's Educational Institute Identification Number (EIIN) is 123838.

== See also ==
- Education in Bangladesh
- List of schools in Bangladesh
- Board of Intermediate and Secondary Education, Rajshahi
