= Khadim Hussain Raja =

Pakistani general, diplomat, author (1922–1999)

Major General Khadim Hussain Raja
- خادم حسین راجہ

Ambassador of Pakistan to Mozambique, Angola, Swaziland, Lesotho

Managing Director Army Welfare Trust
- In office 1972–1977

DG Artillery
- In office 12 April 1971 – 1972

GOC 14th Division

Personal details
- Born: 23 November 1922 Haranpur, Jhelum District, British India
- Died: 9 December 1999 (aged 77) Islamabad, Pakistan
- Education: Government College University, Lahore; Indian Military Academy; Staff College, Quetta; United States Army Command and General Staff College

Military service
- Allegiance: British India (1942-47); Pakistan (1947-71)
- Branch/service: British Indian Army; Pakistan Army
- Years of service: 1942–1971
- Rank: Major General
- Unit: Regiment of Artillery
- Commands: 14 Infantry Division (East Pakistan)
- Battles/wars: World War II; Burma campaign; Indo-Pakistani War of 1947; Indo-Pakistani War of 1965; Bangladesh Liberation War; Operation Searchlight; Indo-Pakistani War of 1971

Khadim Hussain Raja (Urdu: خادم حسین راجہ; 23 November 1922 – 9 December 1999) was a Pakistani military officer and author. He is largely known for his role in the Indo-Pakistani War of 1971 and was in charge of planning Operation Searchlight. He was the general officer commanding of the 14th Division during the war.

== Early life and education ==
Raja was born on 23 November 1922 in Haranpur, Jhelum District to an agriculturist family. He received his education from Central Model High School in Lahore and graduated with Honours in English from Government College University, Lahore.

== Military career ==
=== Commission ===
He joined the British Indian Army in 1942 and received the King's Commission from the Indian Military Academy in Dehradun.

=== World War II deployment ===
He served in an infantry battalion in the Burma campaign of World War II until the end of the war.

=== Pakistan Army ===
After the Partition of British India in 1947, he opted to join the Pakistan Army. He volunteered in the Indo-Pakistani War of 1947-1948 where he saw action in Kashmir.

=== Military education ===
He graduated from the Staff College, Quetta and afterward from the United States Army Command and General Staff College.

=== Commands ===
He commanded the 1st Pakistani Battalion (Quaid-i-Azam's own) at the Pakistan Military Academy.

=== 1971 War ===
He was in charge of planning the military operation known as Operation Searchlight which was executed on 25 March 1971. Other generals were present in Dhaka along with Yahya Khan, who secretly departed on the evening of that day after setting the deadline for the military action. Lt Gen Tikka Khan, Maj Gen Rao Farman Ali and Maj Gen Khadim Hussain Raja were associated with the planning of the military action.

== Retirement and later career ==
On 11 April 1971, he was relieved of his duties as general officer commanding of 14th Division. He later retired the same year after serving as DG Artillery.

In 1972 he was appointed to Army Welfare Trust and became its first managing director. He held the position for five years before he eventually retired and became Ambassador of Pakistan to Mozambique on 1 August 1982 also accredited to Angola, Swaziland, and Lesotho.

== Death ==
Raja died on 9 December 1999 in Islamabad, Pakistan.

== Posthumous book release ==
Before his death, he authored a book and instructed his family to not publish it until after he died. The book was later released 13 years after his death.

The book detailed their actions in the early hours of 26 March 1971 known as Operation Searchlight. He wrote a book, A Stranger in My Own Country: East Pakistan, 1969-71 (Oxford University Press, 2012), in which he revealed secrets about the nine-month liberation war of Bangladesh.

The Mukti Bahini's (under M. A. G. Osmani) initial success in capturing a portable radio-transmitter near Rangamati was short-lived due to Raja's accidental discovery of the transmitter—he had authorised a search for it, and directed it from his personal helicopter through radio-contact when it was fired-upon.

== Awards and decorations ==
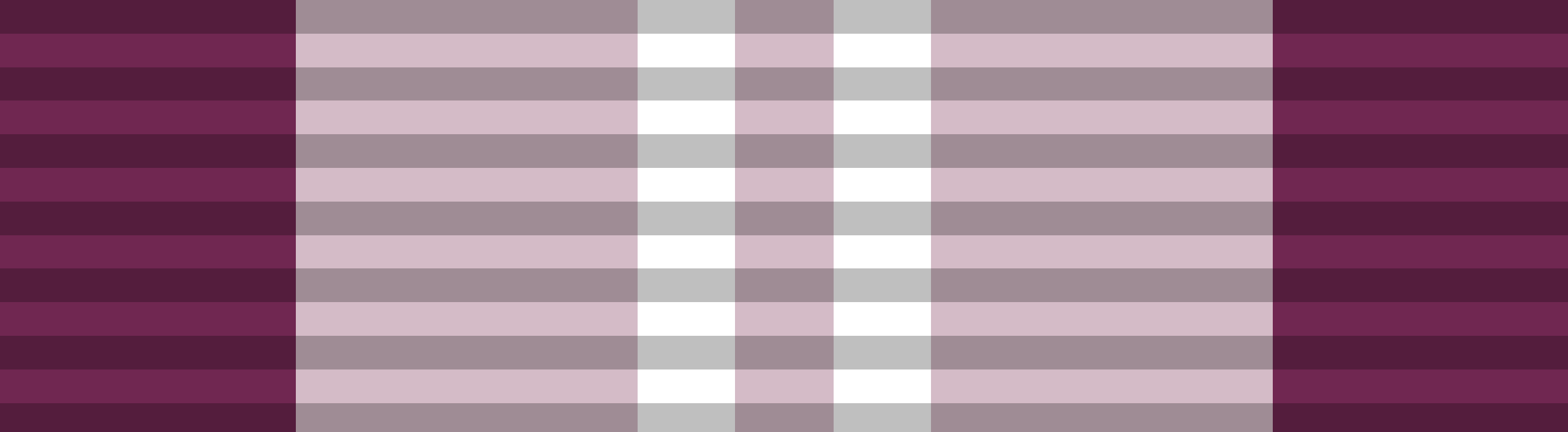

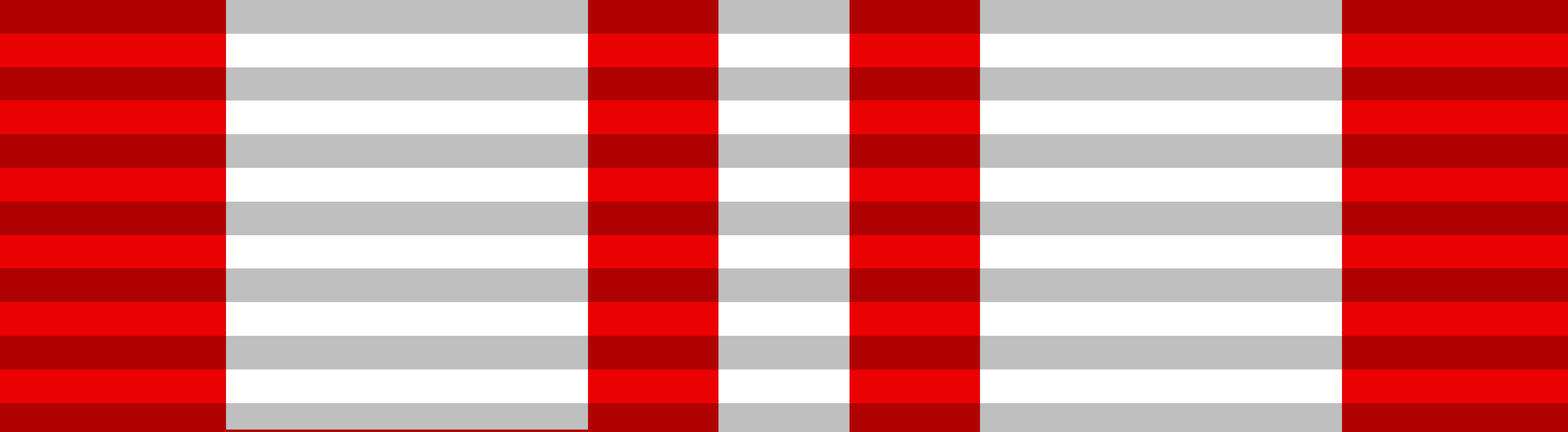

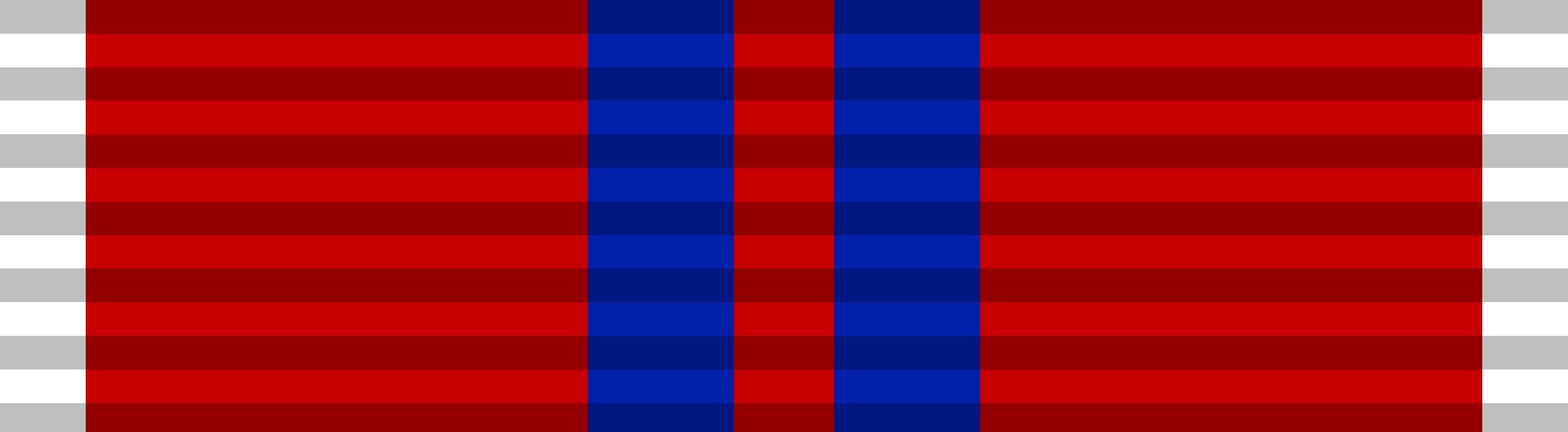

Sitara-e-Quaid-e-Azam (SQA)		Sitara-e-Khidmat (SK)	
Tamgha-e-Diffa (General Service Medal): 1. 1965 War Clasp; 2. 1971 War Clasp	Tamgha-e-Jang 1965 War (War Medal 1965)	Tamgha-e-Jang 1971 War (War Medal 1971)	Pakistan Tamgha (Pakistan Medal) 1947
Tamgha-e-Jamhuria (Republic Commemoration Medal) 1956	Burma Star	War Medal 1939-1945	Queen Elizabeth II Coronation Medal (1953)

=== Foreign decorations ===
Foreign Awards
UK	Burma Star
UK	War Medal 1939-1945
UK	Queen Elizabeth II Coronation Medal
