= Abdul Qadir (officer) =

Pro-Mukti Bahini Army Officer

- Born: 2 January 1929; Rangpur, Bengal, British India
- Died: 28 April 1971 (aged 42); Chittagong Cantonment, Chittagong, Bangladesh
- Burial place: Qadirabad Cantonment
- Military career
- Allegiance: Pakistan (Before 1971); Bangladesh
- Branch: Pakistan Army; Bangladesh Army
- Service years: 1949–1971
- Rank: Lieutenant Colonel
- Unit: Corps of Engineers
- Commands: ADOS of Sector – I
- Conflicts: Bangladesh Liberation War; Operation Searchlight †

Lieutenant Colonel Abdul Qadir (2 January 1929 – 28 April 1971) was an officer of the Pakistan Army and later ADOS for the Mukti Bahini while serving in Chittagong during the initial period of the Bangladesh Liberation War. He was involved in the Bengali independence movement and was arrested by the Pakistan Army in April 1971. He was presumed to have been murdered, and in 2008, his body was found in a mass grave.

== Biography ==
Abdul Qadir was born on 2 January 1929 in Rangpur, in what was then Bengal Province (now Bangladesh). He was a son of Abul Hossain Miah, a businessman. He joined the Corps of Engineers of the Pakistan Army in 1949. He graduated from the Army School of Engineering in 1962, and three years later completed an engineer officers' career course in Virginia, United States. He finished graduate studies at the Physics Department of Dhaka University. In 1966, he was promoted to lieutenant colonel. He was made the chief of the Oil and Gas Development Corporation of East Pakistan in 1970.

== Death ==
Qadir was sympathetic to the Bengali independence movement, and after the start of the Bangladesh Liberation War, he assisted the Bengali freedom fighters by supplying them with explosives and assisted groups in organizing the movement. He was arrested on 17 April 1971 by the Pakistan Army at his residence in Chittagong. He then disappeared in custody. His body was found in a mass grave in Chittagong in 2008. The site of the mass grave was located by Nadeem Qadir, his son. Qadir's body was exhumed from the mass grave and buried in Qadirabad Cantonment in Natore, Rajshahi, Bangladesh, with full military honours. The cantonment was later named after him. A stamp was issued with his image by the Government of Bangladesh.

== Personal life ==
He was married to Hasna Hena Qadir. She was one of the founders of Ekattorer Ghatak Dalal Nirmul Committee, an organisation that has been demanding trial of war criminals from the Bangladesh Liberation War. His son, Nadeem Qadir, is the press minister of the Bangladesh High Commission in the United Kingdom.
