= Babar Iftikhar =

Pakistani lieutenant general

Babar Iftikhar retired HI(M)
- بابرافتخار
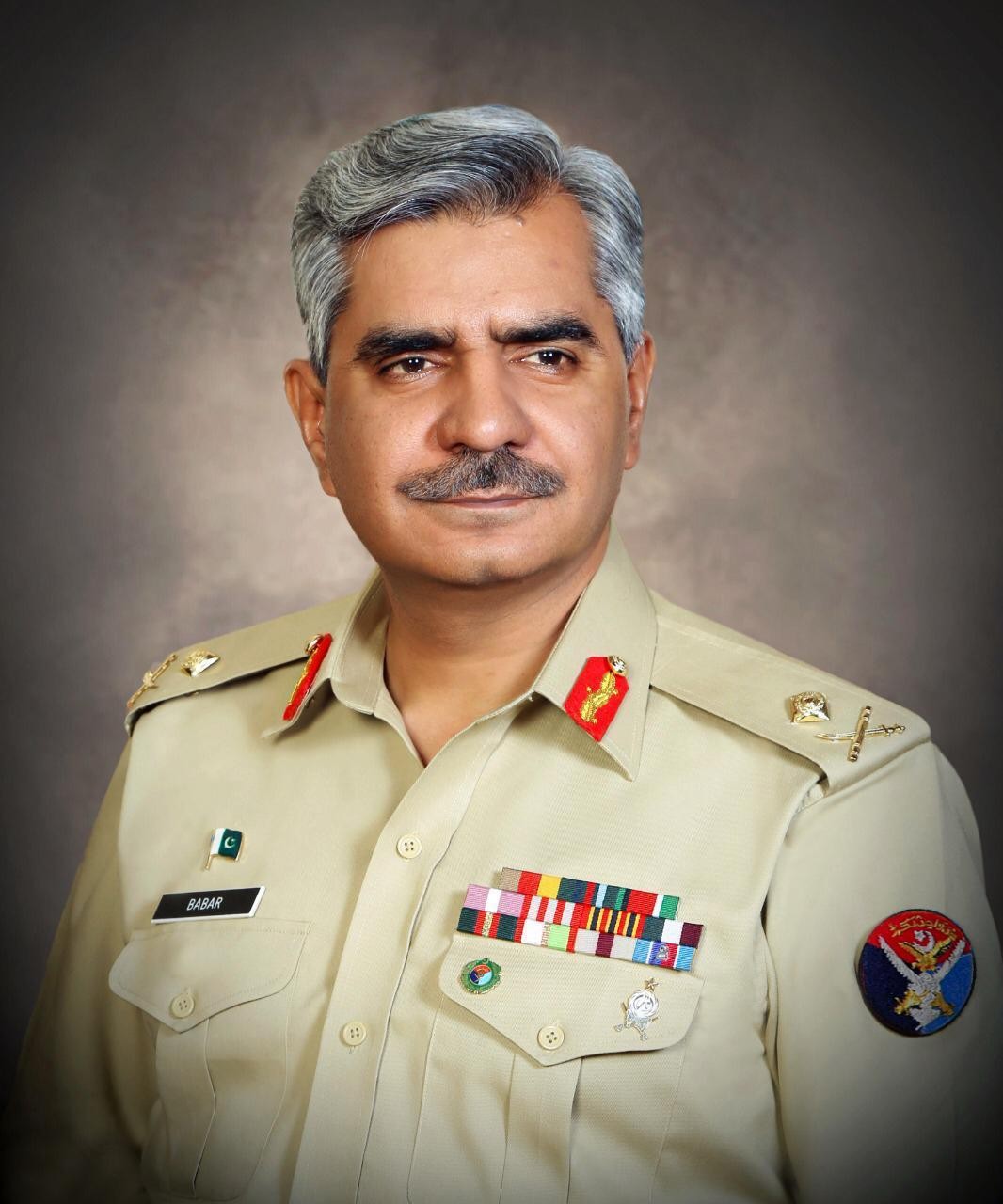
- Official portrait, 2020, pictured as a Major General

President National Defence University, Islamabad
- In office 22 January 2025 – 11 October 2026
- President: Asif Ali Zardari
- Prime Minister: Shehbaz Sharif
- Preceded by: Lt-Gen. Asif Ghafoor

Corps Commander V Corps
- In office 6 December 2022 – 24 January 2025
- President: Arif Alvi; Asif Ali Zardari
- Prime Minister: Shehbaz Sharif; Anwaar ul Haq Kakar (Acting); Shehbaz Sharif
- Chief of Army Staff: FM Asim Munir
- Preceded by: Lt-Gen. Muhammad Saeed (general)
- Succeeded by: Lt-Gen. Muhammad Avais Dastgir

Director General of ISPR
- In office 1 February 2020 – 5 December 2022
- President: Arif Alvi
- Prime Minister: Imran Khan; Shehbaz Sharif
- Chief of Army Staff: Gen Qamar Javed Bajwa
- Preceded by: Lt-Gen. Asif Ghafoor
- Succeeded by: Lt-Gen. Ahmed Sharif Chaudhry

Personal details
- Children: 4 sons
- Education: Army Burn Hall College; Pakistan Military Academy; Command and Staff College; Royal Jordanian Command & Staff College; National Defence University

Military service
- Allegiance: Pakistan
- Branch/service: Pakistan Army
- Years of service: 1990–present
- Rank: Lieutenant General
- Unit: 6th Lancers
- Commands: DG ISPR; Instructor Command & Staff College; Faculty National Defence University; 9th Armoured Brigade
- Battles/wars: Operation Zarb-e-Azb
- Awards: Hilal-i-Imtiaz (military)

Babar Iftikhar (Urdu: بابر افتخار) HI(M) is a retired three-star general in the Pakistan Army who is served as the President of the National Defence University (Pakistan) from 22 January 2025 to 11 October 2026. He was the former 21st director general of the Inter-Services Public Relations (ISPR) from 16 January 2020 to 6 December 2022. He was commissioned in the Pakistan Army in 1990. He is also former General Officer Commanding 1st Armoured Division in Multan. He is also the former commander of V Corps of the Pakistan Army which has its headquarters in Karachi.

== Education ==
Babur Iftikhar attended the Army Burn Hall College in Abbottabad. He graduated from the Command and Staff College and later attended the Royal Jordanian Command & Staff College. After earning his initial degrees, he attended the National Defence University.

== Military career ==
Iftikhar was commissioned in the 6th Lancers (Watson's Horse) in March 1990. He carries with him a rich command, staff and instructional experience. He served as Brigade Major at an armoured brigade, Commander 9 Armoured Brigade at 6th Armoured Division (Pakistan) also famous for being the very brigade of Zia-ul-Haq, Brigadier Staff at an infantry division in North Waziristan (OAM) during Operation Zarb-e-Azb and as Chief of Staff at Corps headquarters. He was faculty of the Pakistan Military Academy and National Defense University, Islamabad. In October 2022, he was promoted to the rank of lieutenant general.

He is the third Director-General in the history of ISPR to be promoted to the rank of Lieutenant General in the Pakistan Army. Others Include Major General Asim Saleem Bajwa (Retired as Lieutenant General) and Major General Asif Ghafoor (Retired Lieutenant General and former President National Defence University, Islamabad ).

Beside, he is the second Director-General in the history of ISPR to head ISPR with a rank of Lieutenant General. The first officer who headed ISPR with a rank of Lieutenant General was Lt.General Asim Saleem Bajwa.

As of January 2025, Ifitikhar as serving as the President National Defence University, Islamabad.

== Press-Conference with DG ISI ==
On October 27, 2022, Iftikhar along with Lieutenant General Nadeem Anjum, made a public appearance at a press conference. The two criticised former Prime Minister Imran Khan over his criticism of the military, motives behind anti-army remarks and portraying Army Chief General Qamar Javed Bajwa as a "traitor" among his followers.

== Effective dates of promotion ==
Insignia	Rank	Date
	Lieutenant General	October 2022
	Major General	June 2018
	Brigadier	June 2014
	Colonel	Direct Brigadier
	Lieutenant Colonel	April 2007
	Major	March 1998
	Captain	March 1993
	Lieutenant	August 1990
	Second Lieutenant	March 1990
