= Asif Ghafoor =

20th Director-General of the Inter-Services Public Relations (Pakistan)

Lieutenant General Asif Ghafoor HI(M)
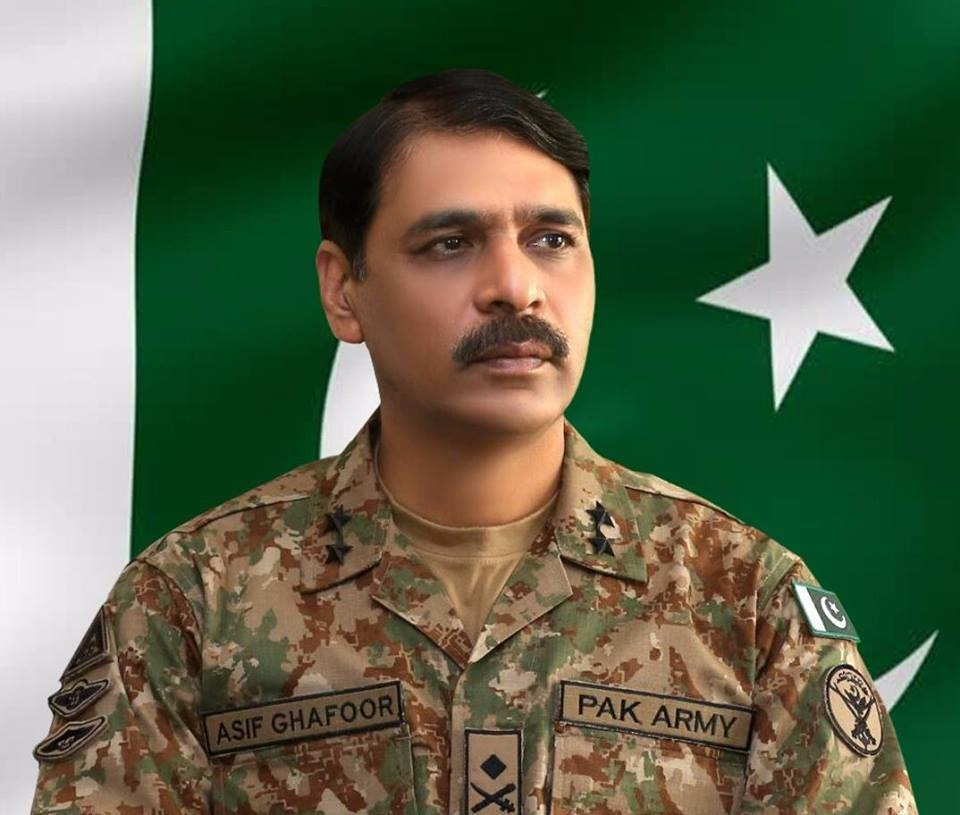
- Asif Ghafoor as Major General

President National Defence University, Islamabad
- In office 25 November 2023 – 22 December 2024
- Preceded by: Lt General Rahat Naseem
- Succeeded by: Lt General Babar Iftikhar

Corps Commander XII Corps
- In office 4 August 2022 – 24 November 2023
- Preceded by: Sarfraz Ali
- Succeeded by: Rahat Naseem

Inspector General Communication & Information Technology
- In office 28 November 2020 – 2 August 2022

General Officer Commanding 40th Infantry Division, Okara
- In office 31 January 2020 – 28 November 2020

20th Director-General of the ISPR
- In office 15 December 2016 – 31 January 2020
- President: Mamnoon Hussain; Arif Alvi
- Prime Minister: Nawaz Sharif; Shahid Khaqan Abbasi; Imran Khan
- Preceded by: Asim Saleem Bajwa
- Succeeded by: Babar Iftikhar

General Officer Commanding 21st Artillery Division, Swat
- In office February 2016 – 15 December 2016

Personal details
- Education: Pakistan Military Academy, Command & Staff College Quetta, Command & Staff College Bandung (Indonesia), National Defence University, Islamabad
- Awards: Hilal-e-Imtiaz (Military)

Military service
- Allegiance: Pakistan
- Branch/service: Pakistan Army
- Years of service: 1988–2024
- Rank: Lieutenant General
- Unit: 87 SP
- Commands: 21 Artillery Division; Director General ISPR; 40 Infantry Division; IG Communication and Information Technology; Commander XII Corps; President National Defence University
- Battles/wars: Kargil War; War in North-West Pakistan; Operation Sherdil; Operation Zarb-e-Azb; Operation Radd-ul-Fasaad; Insurgency in Balochistan; 2019 India–Pakistan border skirmishes
- Nick Name: AG

Asif Ghafoor HI(M) (Urdu: آصِف غفور ) is a retired three-star ranking general in the Pakistani Army, who most recently served as the president of the National Defence University uptill 2024. Previously, Ghafoor served as the Corps Commander Quetta and the 20th director general of the Inter-Services Public Relations (ISPR).

== Education ==
Asif Ghafoor is a graduate of the Command & Staff College in Quetta, Command & Staff College Bandung in Indonesia and the National Defence University in Islamabad. He holds a master's degree in Strategic Studies.

== Military life ==
He was commissioned on 9 September 1988 in the 87 SP Medium Regiment Artillery from PMA Kakul. He had participated in the Kargil War as a Major, operations against terrorists in tribal areas of FATA and Swat during 2008–10 as a Lieutenant Colonel in Operation Sherdil and has commanded a Division at Swat, Malakand in 2016 as a Major General. Asif has also served as Director Military Operations at Army Headquarters GHQ as a Brigadier commanded Divisional Artillery deployed along the Line of Control and infantry brigade along eastern border. He has been on faculty of Command and Staff College Quetta.

The General has served on various staff, instructional and command assignments including Brigade Major Infantry Brigade, Assistant Military Secretary MS Branch, GSO-I Military Operations Directorate, GHQ, Director Military Operations in Military Operations Directorate, GHQ. He has been on the faculty of Command and Staff College, Quetta. He has commanded his parent unit in Operation al-Mizan, Artillery Brigade on Line of Control, Infantry Brigade on Eastern Border and a Division at Swat, Malakand. The General is recipient of COAS Commendation Card for operations in Bajaur during 2008 and Hilal-i-Imtiaz (Military).

In December 2016, Ghafoor was appointed as the Director-General of the ISPR. While serving as DG ISPR, he faced criticism for maintaining a personal Twitter account and engaging in disputes with journalists and individuals who criticized Pakistan's military.

In January 2020, Gen. Ghafoor was appointed as the General Officer Commanding 40 Division in Okara. On 25 November 2020, he was promoted to the rank of Lieutenant General and appointed as Inspector General Communications and Information Technology till August 2022. In August 2022, Asif Ghafoor was appointed Quetta Corps Commander after the death of Lt General Sarfraz Ali in an air crash and continued to held command till November 2023.

He was appointed as the President National Defence University Islamabad in November 2023 and continued to serve in the capacity till his retirement in late December 2024.

== Awards and decorations ==

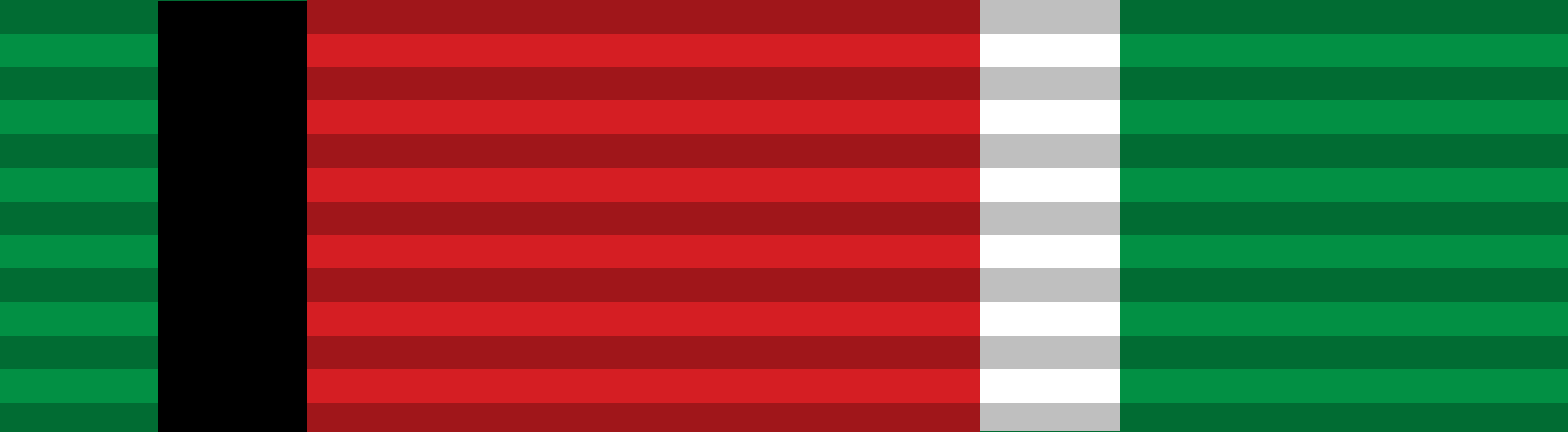

	Hilal-e-Imtiaz (Military) (Crescent of Excellence)		
Tamgha-e-Diffa (General Service Medal) Siachen Glacier Clasp	Tamgha-e-Baqa (Nuclear Test Medal) 1998	Tamgha-e-Istaqlal Pakistan (Escalation with India Medal) 2002	Tamgha-e-Azm (Medal of Conviction) (2018)
10 Years Service Medal	20 Years Service Medal	30 Years Service Medal	35 Years Service Medal
Jamhuriat Tamgha (Democracy Medal) 1988	Qarardad-e-Pakistan Tamgha (Resolution Day Golden Jubilee Medal) 1990	Tamgha-e-Salgirah Pakistan (Independence Day Golden Jubilee Medal) 1997	Command and Staff College Quetta Centenary Instructor's Medal

Military offices
Preceded by Lt Gen Asim Saleem Bajwa	Director General of the ISPR; 2016 - 2020	Succeeded by Major General Babar Iftikhar
