= Naveed Mukhtar =

Pakistani Army general

Chairman Army Welfare Trust
- Incumbent
- Assumed office 15 January 2021

22nd Commander of the V Corps
- In office October 2014 – 7 December 2016
- Preceded by: Lt Gen Sajjad Ghani
- Succeeded by: Shahid Baig Mirza

Director General of the ISI
- In office 11 December 2016 – 25 October 2018
- Prime Minister: Nawaz Sharif; Shahid Khaqan Abbasi; Imran Khan
- Preceded by: Lt. Gen. Rizwan Akhtar
- Succeeded by: Lt. Gen. Asim Munir

Personal details
- Education: Command and Staff College; National Defence University; United States Army War College (Strategic Studies)

Military service
- Allegiance: Pakistan
- Branch/service: Pakistan Army
- Years of service: 1983 – 2018
- Rank: Lieutenant General
- Unit: 13th Lancers
- Commands: Director General ISI; Director General CT Wing ISI; Commander V Corps; Commander 25th Mechanized Division, Malir

Naveed Mukhtar is a retired three-star Pakistan Army lieutenant general and former spymaster who served as the Director General of the ISI in office from 11 December 2016 until his retirement on 25 October 2018. Before his appointment as Director General of the ISI, Mukhtar commanded the V Corps. He is credited with having played a pivotal role in the success of Operation Lyari.

== Personal life ==
Mukhtar belongs to a Punjabi Muslim Arain family from the Nankana Sahib region of Punjab.

His father Mukhtar Ahmed is a retired brigadier of the Pakistan Army, whose cousin Chaudhry Munir is a businessman from Rahim Yar Khan. Chaudhry Munir's daughter is married to Naveed Mukhtar's son, while a sister has married into the Abu Dhabi royal family and a son has married the granddaughter of Nawaz Sharif.

== Military career ==
Mukhtar was commissioned in the Armored Corps regiment in 1983. He joined the Army in the 68th Pakistan Military Academy course. He grew his ranks until Major with 13 Lancers. He later commanded 22 Cavalry as a Lieutenant Colonel. He has commanded the 25th Mechanized Division. Naveed Mukhtar possesses a vast experience in the field of intelligence. He had also headed the counter-terrorism wing of the ISI in Islamabad.

He was promoted to the rank of Lieutenant General and posted to the V Corps as a Commander in September 2014 until 7 December 2016.

He was appointed the Director General of the ISI on 11 December 2016.

Since 15 Jan 2021, Naveed Mukhtar is serving as the Chairman of the Army Welfare Trust.

== Academic career ==
He graduated from the Command and Staff College, National Defence University and the prestigious United States Army War College. At the US Army War College, Mukhtar authored a strategy research project report titled 'Afghanistan – Alternative Futures and their Implications' in fulfillment of the requirements of the Master in Strategic Studies Degree.

Military offices
Preceded by Rizwan Akhtar	Director General of the Inter-Services Intelligence	Succeeded by Asim Munir
