= Avais Dastgir =

Pakistan military officer

- محمد اویس دستگیر
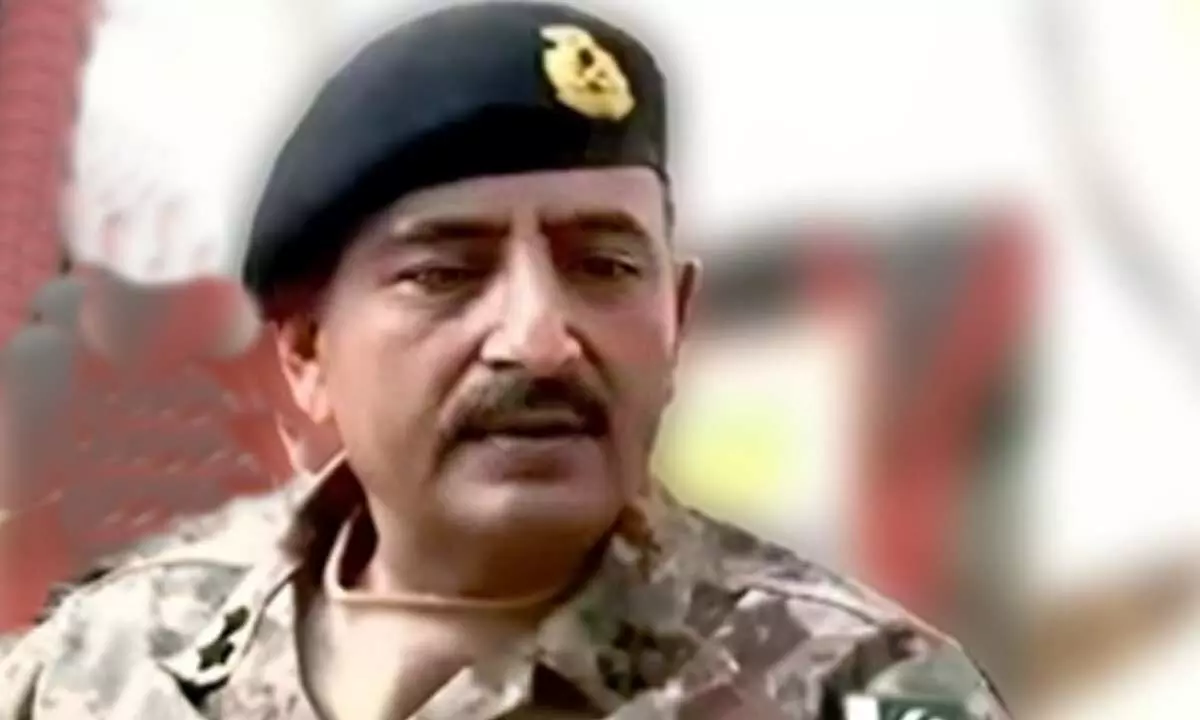
- Muhammad Avais Dastgir as Maj Gen

Commander V Corps, Karachi
- Incumbent
- Assumed office 24 January 2025
- President: Asif Ali Zardari
- Prime Minister: Shebaz Sharif
- Chief of Army Staff: FM Asim Munir
- Preceding: Lt-Gen. Babar Iftikhar

40th Chief of General Staff
- In office 25 November 2023 – 24 January 2025
- Chief of Army Staff: FM Asim Munir
- Preceded by: Lt-Gen. Muhammad Saeed
- Succeeded by: Lt-Gen. Syed Aamer Raza

Personal details
- Born: Pakistan
- Education: Pakistan Military Academy
- Awards: Hilal-e-Imtiaz (Military); Hilal-e-Imtiaz (Civilian)

Military service
- Allegiance: Pakistan
- Branch/service: Pakistan Army
- Years of service: 1991 — present
- Rank: Lieutenant General
- Unit: 58th Cavalry Regiment
- Commands: Chief of General Staff; Commander V Corps, Karachi

Muhammad Avais Dastgir, is a three-star general in the Pakistan Army, currently serving as the Corps Commander of V Corps (Karachi), since January 2025. He previously served as Chief of General Staff (CGS) at the GHQ, one of the most influential positions in the army hierarchy.

== Military career ==
Dastgir was commissioned into the 58th Cavalry of the Pakistan Armoured Corps. His early roles included instructional and command positions within the Armoured Corps. He later became the Director General Military Operations (DGMO), a key operational post at GHQ.

He was promoted to the rank of Major general in 2019. In November 2023, upon his promotion to the rank of lieutenant general, he was appointed as CGS, replacing Lt Gen Muhammad Saeed.

In January 2025, he took charge as Corps Commander Karachi (V Corps), succeeding Lt Gen Babar Iftikhar.

== Public appearances ==
In February 2025, Lt Gen Dastgir was the chief guest at the passing-out parade of the 52nd Basic Aviation Security Course and the 32nd Officer Basic Aviation Security Course at the Airports Security Force (ASF) Academy, Karachi. He praised ASF for its professionalism and its role in securing Pakistani airports.

He also inaugurated the 41st National Elite Men and 5th National Elite Women Boxing Championship in Karachi, highlighting the army’s support for national sports.

== International relations ==
As CGS, Lt Gen Dastgir visited China in November 2024 and met with General Li Qiaoming, Commander of the People's Liberation Army Ground Force. The meeting focused on regional security and the safety of Chinese personnel in Pakistan.
