= Rizwan Akhtar =

Pakistani university administrator

Lieutenant General Rizwan Akhtar HS HI(M)
- رضوان اختر

President National Defence University, Islamabad
- In office 11 December 2016 – 9 October 2017

26th Director General of the ISI
- In office 7 November 2014 – 11 December 2016
- President: Mamnoon Hussain
- Prime Minister: Nawaz Sharif
- Preceded by: Zaheer-ul-Islam
- Succeeded by: Naveed Mukhtar

Director General Pakistan Rangers (Sindh)

Military service
- Allegiance: Pakistan
- Branch/service: Pakistan Army
- Years of service: 1982 – 2017
- Rank: Lieutenant-General
- Unit: Frontier Force Regiment
- Commands: President National Defence University; DG ISI; DG Rangers (Sindh)
- Battles/wars: War in Afghanistan (2001–2021): War in North-West Pakistan; (Operation Zarb-e-Azb); Karachi Operation
- Awards: Hilal-e-Shujaat; Hilal-e-Imtiaz (Military)

Rizwan Akhtar HS HI(M) (Urdu: رضوان اختر) is a former three-star rank Pakistan Army general. He is a former spymaster who served as Director General of the ISI. He served from 8 November 2014 to 11 December 2016. On 8 October 2017, he announced his pre-mature retirement from the army.

== Military career ==
Rizwan Akhtar was commissioned in the Pakistan Army in the Frontier Force Regiment in September 1982. He commanded an infantry brigade and infantry division in the Federally Administered Tribal Areas (FATA) after serving as Operation and Planning Officer at Peshawar Corps.

As Director General of the Pakistan Rangers in Sindh, Major General Rizwan Akhtar played a key role in restoring normalcy in Karachi, which was reeling under high crime rate, gang-wars and terrorism.

Akhtar is also considered to have extensive experience of counterinsurgency from a previous posting in the border region of South Waziristan. After getting promoted to the rank of Lieutenant General in September 2014, he was posted as Director General of the ISI but took pre-mature retirement from the army in October 2017.

== Academic career ==
Rizwan Akhtar is a graduate of the Command and Staff College in Quetta, National Defense University, Islamabad (NDU) and United States Army War College, Pennsylvania, USA. At the US Army War College, Akhtar authored a strategy research project report titled ‘US-Pakistan trust deficit and the war on terror’ in fulfillment of the requirements of the Master in Strategic Studies Degree.

== Awards and decorations ==
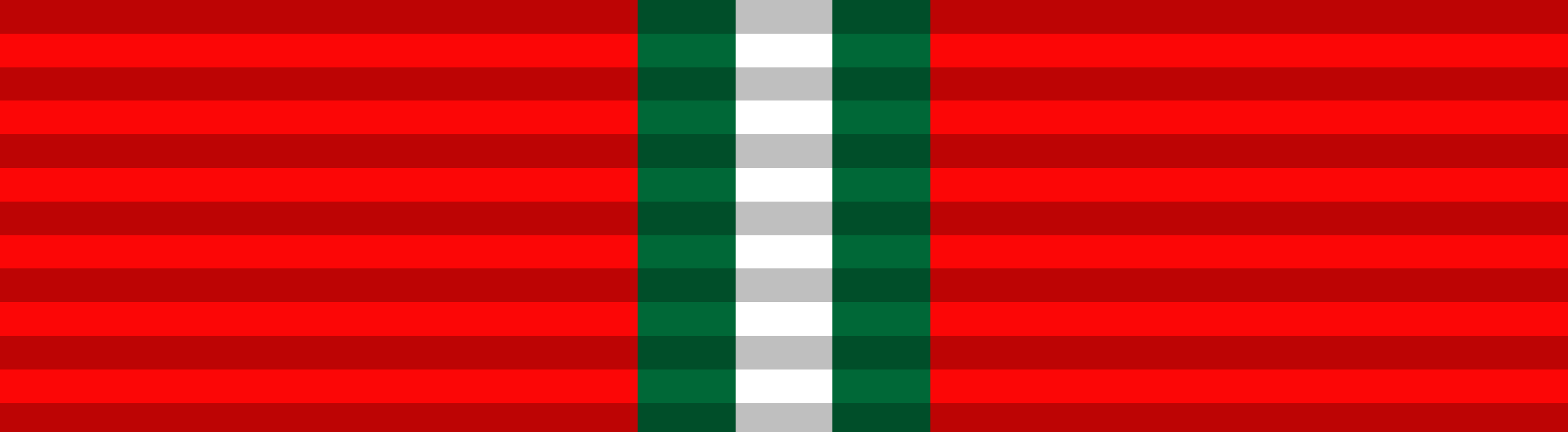

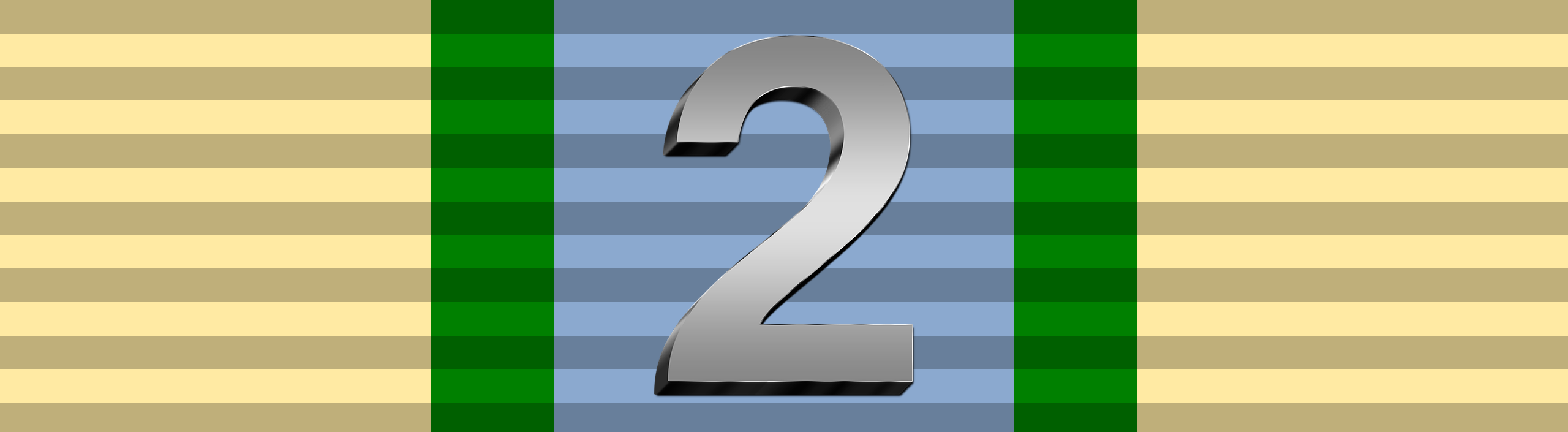

Hilal-e-Shujaat (Crescent of Bravery) 2015	Hilal-e-Imtiaz (Military) (Crescent of Excellence)		Tamgha-e-Baqa (Nuclear Test Medal) 1998
Tamgha-e-Istaqlal Pakistan (Escalation with India Medal) 2002	10 Years Service Medal	20 Years Service Medal	30 Years Service Medal
35 Years Service Medal	Tamgha-e-Sad Saala Jashan-e- Wiladat-e-Quaid-e-Azam (100th Birth Anniversary of Muhammad Ali Jinnah) 1976	Hijri Tamgha (Hijri Medal) 1979	Jamhuriat Tamgha (Democracy Medal) 1988
Qarardad-e-Pakistan Tamgha (Resolution Day Golden Jubilee Medal) 1990	Tamgha-e-Salgirah Pakistan (Independence Day Golden Jubilee Medal) 1997	Command & Staff College Quetta Instructor's Medal	United Nations MONUC Medal (2 Deployments)

=== Foreign decorations ===
Foreign Awards
United Nations	UN MONUC Congo Medal (2 Deployments)

Military offices
Preceded by Zaheer-ul-Islam	Director General of the Inter-Services Intelligence	Succeeded by Naveed Mukhtar
