= Raza Muhammad =

Pakistani military officer and diplomat

- Born: Raza Muhammad; 28 August 1957 (age 69); Havelian, Abbottabad, Khyber-Pakhtoonkhwa
- Alma mater: Pakistan Military Academy; Command and Staff College; Führungsakademie der Bundeswehr; National Defence University
- Military career
- Allegiance: Pakistan
- Branch: Pakistan Army
- Service years: 1978–2014
- Rank: Major General
- Unit: 20 Sindh Regiment
- Commands: Infantry Division Pakistan and one of the; DGs ISI; Ministry of Defence Production; Independent Infantry Brigade Group; Sindh Regiment; Director Military Intelligence; Chief of Staff X Corps (Pakistan). High Commissioner of Pakistan to Mauritius
- Conflicts: Siachen Offense; Indo-Pakistani War of 1989
- Awards: Hilal-i-Imtiaz (Military)

Raza Muhammad is a retired two-star general of the Pakistan Army, and has served as the High Commissioner of Pakistan to Mauritius. He was concurrently accredited to Republic of Seychelles, Republic of Madagascar and Union of the Comoros. Raza has also been awarded Hilal-i-Imtiaz (Military) for his meritorious services to the Islamic Republic of Pakistan.

He was an Advisor to President National Defence University (NDU) from 2019 to 2022, and the President of the Islamabad Policy Research Institute (IPRI). He had also served in Army Welfare Trust (AWT) as an Executive Director(Services).

He has also served at the Inter-Services Intelligence as one of the Director Generals before he was deputed to the Ministry of Defence Production (MoDP), Rawalpindi as Additional Secretary.

He is from the Sind Regiment and was promoted to the rank of Major General in August 2008. After being promoted, he was deputed as the General Officer Commanding (GOC) Infantry Division Pakistan where he was transferred command by the then GOC General Raheel Sharif . Before his promotion to the rank of Major General, he served as Chief of Staff Corps Headquarter, Director Military Intelligence Operations at the General Headquarters (Pakistan Army) Rawalpindi and Commander Independent Infantry Brigade Group.

== Early life and family ==
Raza Muhammad was born on 28 August 1957 in Havelian (Abbottabad) in the Khyber Pakhtunkhwa province of Pakistan. He obtained his earlier education in Havelian and studied in a college at Abbottabad.

Raza is married and had a son and has a daughter.

== Military career ==
Raza Muhammad was accepted into the Pakistan Military Academy (Kakul) in 1978 where he attended PMA Long Course. He was given commission into the Pakistan Army in March 1980, and was inducted into the Sind Regiment. As a young Major, Raza participated in the Siachin conflict between Pakistan and India. He served in KSA Army on deputation for two years(1985–1987).

Later on as a Major, he served as a Brigade Major and obtained his BSc in War Studies from Command and Staff College, University of Balochistan, Quetta, and also served there in the Directing Staff. From there he was sent to Germany where he attended a German Staff Course from Führungsakademie der Bundeswehr, Hamburg (General Staff College) and also did a year-long course in German Language. As a Lieutenant Colonel, he attended the War Course at the National Defence University, Islamabad, and obtained a M.Sc. degree in War Studies Quaid-e-Azam University, Islamabad, and an M.Phill in International Relations, NDU, with a gold medal. He was also retained twice as an instructor at the National Defence University, Islamabad, after having served at the Command and Staff College, Quetta as a Senior Instructor.

As a Brigadier, Raza also attended a United Nations Peacekeeping course for Decision Makers at DILS, New Port, United States of America.

General Raza was later sent to the Inter-Services Intelligence where he served for three years, handling the external wing of the organisation.

Deputation = 1985-1987 KSA
Education = BSC Honours University of Balochistan, MSC War Studies QAU, M.Phil(IR) NDU, Phd(IR) on CPEC from NDU in 2021

== Awards and decorations ==
Service Medals
10 Years Service Medal
20 Years Service Medal
30 Years Service Medal
Command and Staff College Centenary Medal
Non-operational Military Awards
Hilal-e-Imtiaz (Crescent of Excellence)
Commemorative Medals
Qarardad-e-Pakistan Tamgha (Resolution Day Golden Jubilee Medal)
Tamgha-e-Istaqlal (Escalation versus India Medal)
Hijri Tamgha (Hijri Medal)
Tamgha-e-Jamhuriat (Democracy Medal)
Independence Day Golden Jubilee Medal
Tamgha-e-Baqa (Nuclear Test Medal)

| |Siachin Medal with Clasp |}
