= Nadeem Anjum =

30th Director-General of Inter-Services Intelligence (Pakistan)

Nadeem Anjum HI(M)
- ندیم انجم
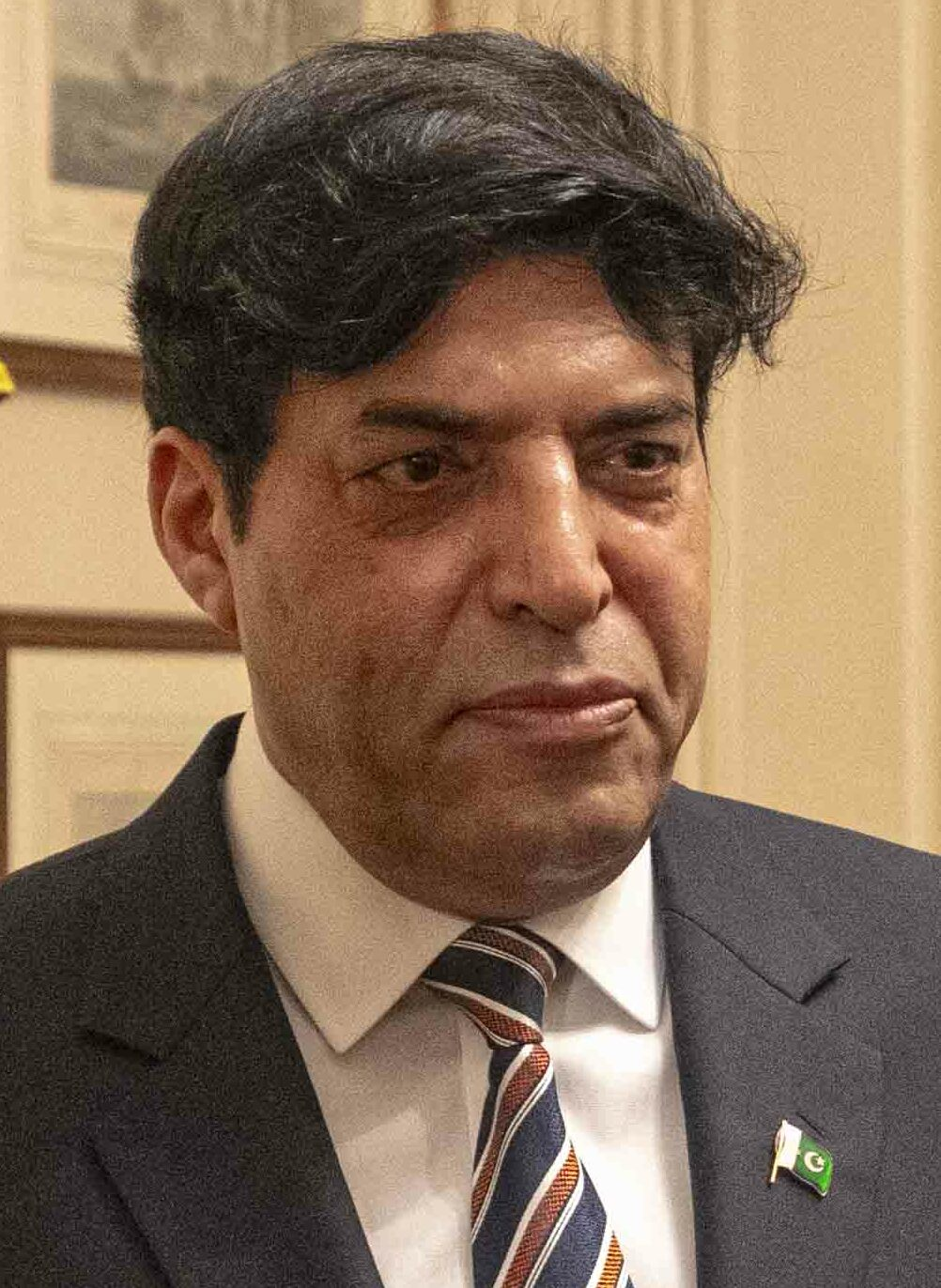
- Anjum in 2023

30th Director-General of Inter-Services Intelligence
- In office 20 November 2021 – 29 September 2024
- President: Arif Alvi; Asif Ali Zardari
- Prime Minister: Imran Khan; Shehbaz Sharif; Anwaar ul Haq Kakar (Caretaker); Shehbaz Sharif
- Preceded by: Lt. General Faiz Hameed
- Succeeded by: Lt. General Asim Malik

Commander V Corps Karachi, Sindh
- In office December 2020 – 9 November 2021
- President: Arif Alvi
- Prime Minister: Imran Khan
- Preceded by: Lt. Gen. Hamayun Aziz
- Succeeded by: Lt. Gen. Muhammed Saeed

Commandant Command and Staff College Quetta
- In office November 2018 – December 2020
- Preceded by: Sarfraz Ali
- Succeeded by: Maj Gen Amer Ahsan Nawaz

IG Frontier Corps (Balochistan)
- In office 14 December 2016 – December 2018
- Preceded by: Maj Gen Sher Afghun
- Succeeded by: Maj Gen Fayyaz Hussain Shah

Personal details
- Born: Mohra Sheikhan, Kauntrila, Rawalpindi District
- Education: Pakistan Military Academy; Combined Arms Centre UK; Command and Staff College Quetta; National Defence University, Pakistan; Asia-Pacific Center for Security Studies; Royal College of Defence Studies; King's College London

Military service
- Allegiance: Pakistan
- Branch/service: Pakistan Army
- Years of service: 1988–2024
- Rank: Lieutenant General
- Unit: 28 Punjab Regiment
- Battles/wars: Insurgency in Balochistan; Operation Zarb-e-Azb; Operation Radd-ul-Fasaad
- Awards: Hilal-i-Imtiaz (military)

Nadeem Ahmed Anjum is a retired three-star general of the Pakistan Army, who served as the 30th Director-General of Inter-Services Intelligence from 20 November 2021 to 29 September 2024.

== Early life and education ==
Nadeem Anjum was born into a Punjabi Shaikh family. He hails from the village of Mohra Sheikhan located in Kauntrila, in the Gujar Khan Tehsil of Rawalpindi District.

A product of the Pakistan Military Academy (PMA), Anjum is a graduate from the National Defence University (NDU) and later earned a master's degree from King's College, London, having also studied at the Asia-Pacific Centre for Security Studies, USA, then serving as an instructor at the PMA, at the NDU as well at the Army Staff College.

He is known to enjoy running, basketball and cricket and is also considered to be an avid reader.

== Military career ==
He was first commissioned in March 1988 in the 28th Punjab Regiment and is from the 77th PMA Long Course.

He served as the Inspector-General of the Frontier Corps in Balochistan from December 2016 to December 2018. For his role against the insurgency in Balochistan he eventually earned the title of Mohsin-e-Pakistan or benefactor of Pakistan.

He has also served as Corps Commander of the V Corps from December 2020 to October 2021.

== DG-ISI ==
=== Appointment ===
the beginning of October 2021 the Prime Minister's Office formally received three names from the COAS for the appointment of a new Director-General of the ISI, including Lt. Gen. Nadeem Anjum, Lt. Gen. Farhan Ali and Lt. Gen. Saqib Malik. Lieutenant General Nadeem Ahmed Anjum was appointed DG ISI on 20 November 2021.

=== Press conference of October 2022 ===
This marked the first time that the head of the ISI gave a live briefing or even addressed the media.

The pair addressed and tried to answer multiple issues that were taking place at the time, especially regarding Lettergate, Arshad Sharif's death, the failed assassination attempt on former Prime Minister Imran Khan, the military's support of Shahbaz Sharif amidst the alleged involvement of General Bajwa towards Imran Khan's ouster, and Khan's Azadi March 2022.

Regarding the Lettergate affair, Anjum asserted that during the National Security Committee of Pakistan's meeting on the cypher, Anjum "categorically clarified" that there was "no evidence found" regarding a foreign conspiracy to oust the PTI-led government. However, in National Security Council meeting, cypher was found to be real as presented in the NSC meeting and a strong demarche was issued. Therefore, in the National Security Committee meeting on the cypher, both civil and military leadership jointly agreed that the cypher represented a "blatant interference in the internal affairs of Pakistan", and issued a demarche to the Acting US envoy in Islamabad in response.

=== Extension ===
In September 2023, Anjum's tenure as ISI chief was extended for one year.

On 23 September 2024, it was reported that Anjum will retire from army service on 30 September 2024.

== Controversies ==
=== Appointment ===
His appointment as Director-General of the ISI attracted controversy, due to the civilian government not being consulted, despite the appointment needing its approval. A deadlock ensued between the civil government and the military, leading to the civil government taking three weeks to approve Anjum’s appointment as Director-General.

=== Murder of Arshad Sharif ===
The mother of Arshad Sharif accused senior Pakistani intelligence officers of involvement in the murder, including the then-Army Chief General Qamar Javed Bajwa and the head of the ISI, General Nadeem Anjum, for the "targeted, premeditated, planned and calculated murder" of her son.

Following the assassination of Sharif, the Ministry of Interior removed ISI representatives from the team that traveled to Kenya to investigate Sharif's killing.

=== Intimidiating the judiciary ===
On 26 March 2024, six judges of the Islamabad High Court (IHC) accused the ISI of interference in judicial matters and intimidation tactics. One judge accused the ISI of torturing his brother-in-law while another discovered secret cameras in his living room and bedroom.

=== Vote of no confidence against Imran Khan ===
In September 2024, Maulana Fazal-ur-Rehman alleged that Anjum influenced the vote of no confidence against Imran Khan. He articulated that Anjum was serving as the head of ISI while Qamar Javed Bajwa was the Chief of the Army Staff during the time of the no-confidence vote.

== Awards and decorations ==

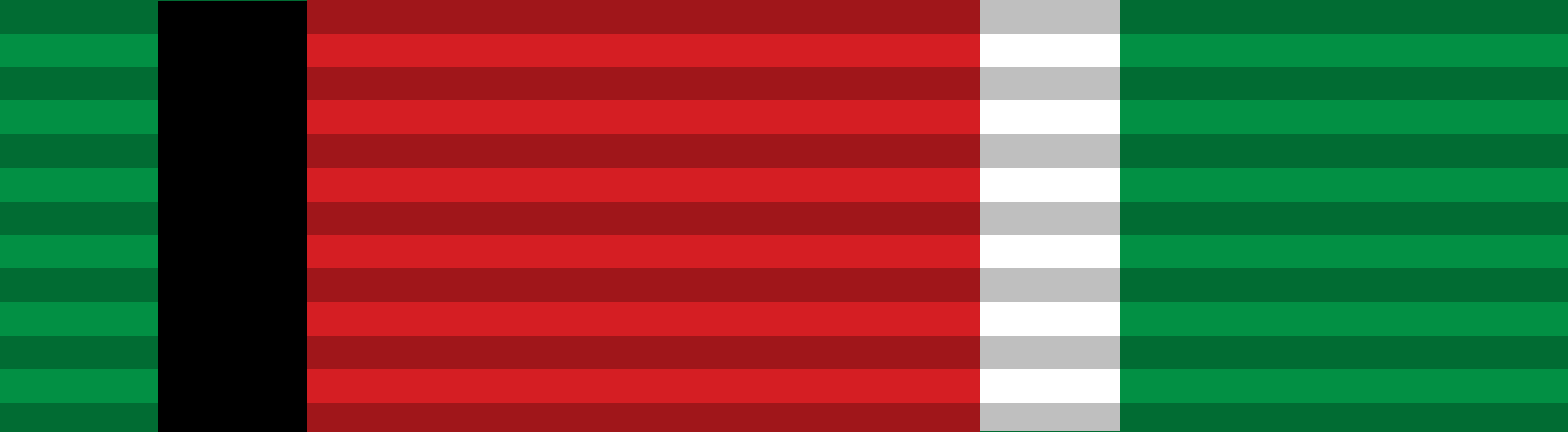

	Hilal-e-Imtiaz (Military) (Crescent of Excellence)		
Tamgha-e-Diffa (General Service Medal) Siachen Glacier Clasp	Tamgha-e-Baqa (Nuclear Test Medal) 1998	Tamgha-e-Istaqlal Pakistan (Escalation with India Medal) 2002	Tamgha-e-Azm (Medal of Conviction) (2018)
10 Years Service Medal	20 Years Service Medal	30 Years Service Medal	35 Years Service Medal
Jamhuriat Tamgha (Democracy Medal) 1988	Qarardad-e-Pakistan Tamgha (Resolution Day Golden Jubilee Medal) 1990	Tamgha-e-Salgirah Pakistan (Independence Day Golden Jubilee Medal) 1997	Command and Staff College Quetta Centenary Instructor's Medal

== Effective dates of promotion ==
Insignia	Rank	Date
	Lieutenant General	September 2019
	Major General	January 2016
	Brigadier	January 2012
	Colonel	April 2008
	Lieutenant Colonel	September 2004
	Major	October 1999
	Captain	April 1994
	Lieutenant	April 1990
	Second Lieutenant	September 1988

Military offices
Preceded by Lt. Gen. Faiz Hameed	Director General of the Inter-Services Intelligence	Succeeded by Current
