= V Corps (Pakistan) =

Pakistan Army's Holding Corps

- Badge of V Corps
- Active: 1975; 51 years ago
- Country: Pakistan
- Branch: Pakistan Army
- Type: XXX Corps
- Role: Maneuver/Deployment oversight.
- Size: ~45,000 approximately (Though this may vary as units are rotated)
- HQ/Garrison: Karachi Cantonment, Sindh, Pakistan
- Nickname: Karachi Corps
- Colors Identification: Red, white and gold
- Anniversaries: 1975
- Decorations: Military Decorations of Pakistan military

Commanders
- Commander: Lt-Gen. Muhammad Avais Dastgir
- Chief of Staff: Brig. Nauman Manzoor Awan
- Notable commanders: Gen. A. S. Hyat; Gen. Asif Nawaz; Lt-Gen. Arif Bangash; Lt.Gen.Zaheerul Islam; Lt-Gen. Naveed Mukhtar; Lt-Gen. Nadeem Anjum; Lt-Gen. Muzaffar Hussain Usmani

Insignia
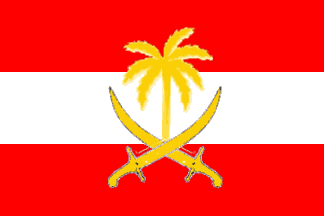
- War Flag

The V Corps is a field corps of the Pakistan Army currently headquartered in Karachi, Sindh in Pakistan. Its current mission objectives are to provide security and external security deployments within its area of responsibility. One of Pakistan army's ten field corps, it has an area of responsibility and responsibility to protect the Sindh region, and to halter Indian advancements into the Sindh, and lower Punjab region.

As of current, the corps is commanded by Lt-Gen. Muhammad Avais Dastgir.

== History ==
=== Formation and war service ===
As part of major re-organization of the Pakistani military, the Army GHQ raised the corps formation with a mission parameter to protect and intercept any Indian Army's attempt to disrupt the North-South landline link between Karachi and Lahore.

Despite its role, the V Corps has not seen active conflict with Indian Army but has provided its expertise in desert warfare while providing assistance to Sindh's police department to contain the local dacoits and law enforcements in Karachi by deploying the Army Rangers.The V Corps is the only strike corps of the army in Sindh; it has area of responsibility and protect the entire province of Sindh.

In 1999, the V Corps was a major part of North-South regional formation, falling under the Southern Command together with the XII Corps but this short-lived due to confusion among the commanders. The Southern Command now exclusively includes the XII Corps.

Despite its strike and combat role, The V Corps has been deployed by the Army GHQ to aide and assist the federal government as part of the military aid to the civil power to help and better prepare for natural disasters with its 18th Infantry Division being involved in establishing relief camps and evacuating people living near the coastline.

== Structure ==
Corps V Commander, Karachi
Lt. Gen. Avais Dastgir
Structure
Assigned Units	Unit Badge	Unit HQ
16th Infantry Division		Pano Aqil
18th Infantry Division		Hyderabad
25th Mechanized Division		Malir
Sindh Rangers		Karachi
31st Mechanized Brigade		Hyderabad
2nd Armored Brigade		Malir
Independent Artillery Brigade		Karachi
Independent Signal Brigade		N/A
Independent Engineering Brigade		N/A
Independent Air Defence Brigade		N/A

== List of corps commanders ==
#	Name	Start of tenure	End of tenure
1	Lt Gen Mohammad Akbar Khan	1974	March 1976
2	Lt Gen Jehanzeb Arbab	March 1976	January 1978
3	Lt Gen Iqbal Khan	January 1978	September 1978
4	Lt Gen S.M. Abbasi	September 1978	March 1980
5	Lt Gen Ahmad Jamal Khan	March 1980	March 1984
6	Lt Gen Ahmad Shamim Khan	March 1984	March 1988
7	Lt Gen Asif Nawaz	March 1988	March 1991
8	Lt Gen Arif Bangash	March 1991	1992
9	Lt Gen Naseer Akhtar	1992	1994
10	Lt Gen Lehrasab Khan	1994	May 1997
11	Lt Gen Afzal Janjua	May 1997	October 1998
12	Lt Gen Muzaffar Hussain Usmani	October 1998	May 2001
13	Lt Gen Tariq Wasim Ghazi	May 2001	January 2004
14	Lt Gen Ahsan Saleem Hyat	January 2004	October 2004
15	Lt Gen Syed Atahar Ali	October 2004	April 2006
16	Lt Gen Ahsan Azhar Hyat	April 2006	October 2008
17	Lt Gen Shahid Iqbal	October 2008	October 2010
18	Lt Gen Zaheerul Islam	October 2010	March 2012
19	Lt Gen Ijaz Chaudhry	March 2012	November 2013
20	Lt Gen Sajjad Ghani	November 2013	October 2014
21	Lt Gen Naveed Mukhtar	October 2014	December 2016
22	Lt Gen Shahid Baig Mirza	December 2016	August 2018
23	Lt Gen Humayun Aziz	August 2018	December 2020
24	Lt Gen Nadeem Ahmed Anjum	December 2020	November 2021
25	Lt Gen Muhammad Saeed	November 2021	December 2022
26	Lt Gen Babar Iftikhar	December 2022	January 2025
27.	Lt Gen Muhammad Avais Dastgir	January 2025	incumbent

== See also ==
- XI Corps (Pakistan)
- I Corps (Pakistan)
- Structure of the Pakistan Army
