= Muhammad Saeed (general) =

Pakistani general

Lieutenant general Muhammad Saeed HI (M)
- Alma mater: National Defence University, Pakistan
- Military career
- Allegiance: Pakistan
- Branch: Pakistan Army
- Service years: 1987–November 2023
- Rank: Lieutenant general
- Commands: Chief of General Staff (Pakistan); V Corps; National Defence University; Pakistan Rangers Sindh; Inter-Services Intelligence
- Awards: Hilal-i-Imtiaz

Muhammad Saeed HI is a retired three-star general of the Pakistan Army who served as the 39th Chief of General Staff (CGS) of Pakistan Army currently serving as the Chairman Water and Power Development Authority (WAPDA) and Chairman Kot Addu Power Company (KAPCO) since August 2025.

Muhammad Saeed previously served as Corps commander V Corps, Karachi and the 34th President of the National Defence University from November 2019 to November 2021, his previous staff assignments include Director-General Analysis (DG-A ISI) of the Inter-Services Intelligence.

== Early life and education ==
Saeed was commissioned in the Pakistan Army on 13 April 1987. He graduated from the National Defence University, Pakistan, and the Command and Staff College. He obtained his master's in science and war studies from Quaid-i-Azam University.

== Military career ==
=== Early appointments ===
He was initially appointed as commander of an infantry brigade, regiment, and later the General Officer Commanding (GOC) of 14th Infantry Division, Okara.

=== Intelligence and staff roles ===
His staff assignments include deputy assistant military secretary (DAMS) and Military Secretary to Chief (MSC) to General Ashfaq Parvez Kyani (Retd), the then Chief of the Army Staff at the GHQ, Rawalpindi. Later, Major-general Saeed served as the Director-General Analysis (DG-A ISI) of the Inter-Services Intelligence.

== Director-General Rangers (Sindh) ==
In January 2016, Muhammad Saeed was appointed Director-General of Pakistan Rangers (Sindh), succeeding Lieutenant General Bilal Akbar. During his tenure (2016–2019), the Rangers intensified operations against terrorists and criminal networks in Karachi in coordination with police and intelligence agencies. These efforts contributed significantly to the improvement of law and order in the city.

=== Anti-street crime measures ===
Saeed played a vital role in addressing street crime in Karachi. He advocated for the inclusion of street crimes under Section 7 of the Anti-Terrorism Act (ATA) to ensure stricter legal action. His leadership was credited with a decrease in crime rates, as highlighted in reports presented during Apex Committee meetings.

== President of National Defence University ==
On 28 November 2019, just days after his promotion to the rank of Lieutenant General, Muhammad Saeed was appointed as the 34th President of the National Defence University (NDU), Islamabad. In addition to his leadership roles, he has served as a faculty member at: School of Infantry and Tactics Pakistan Military Academy Command & Staff College National Defence University.

== Corps Commander Karachi ==
In November 2021, Lieutenant General Saeed assumed command of V Corps, based in Karachi, taking over from Lt Gen Nadeem Anjum, who became the Director General of the Inter-Services Intelligence (ISI).

== Chief of General Staff ==
Lieutenant General Muhammad Saeed served as the 39th Chief of the General Staff of Pakistan Army at GHQ from December 2022 till his retirement in November 2023.

== Chairman WAPDA ==
Post retirement, Lieutenant General (R) Muhammad Saeed serving as the Chairman Water and Power Development Authority(WAPDA) and Chairman Kot Addu Power Company (KAPCO) since August 2025.

== Awards and honours ==
Lieutenant General Muhammad Saeed has been awarded the Hilal-i-Imtiaz (Military) for his distinguished service in the Pakistan Army.

== Awards and decorations ==

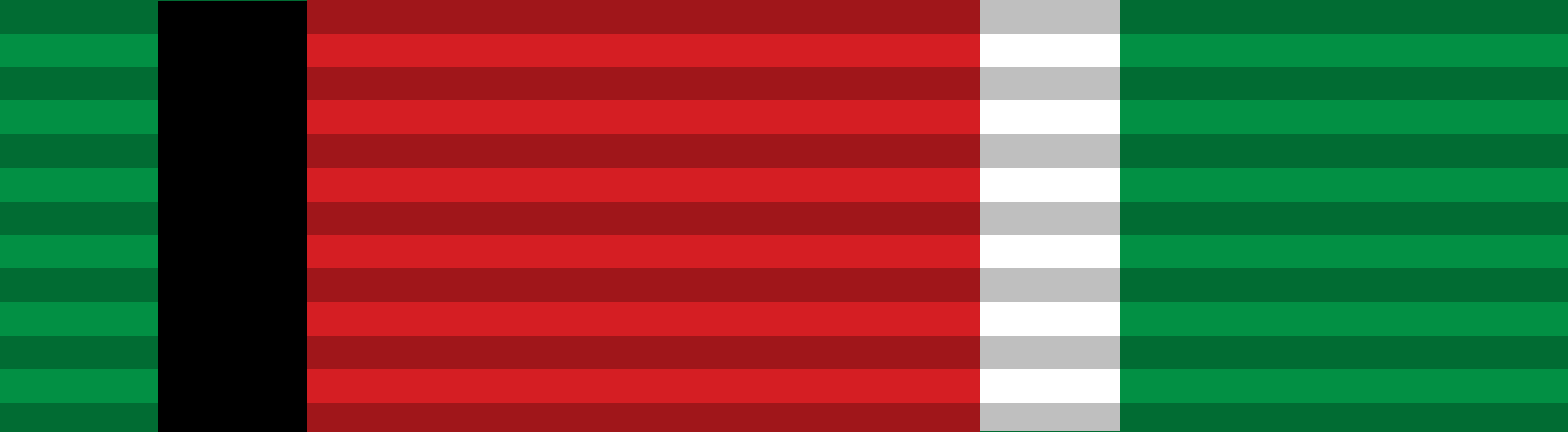

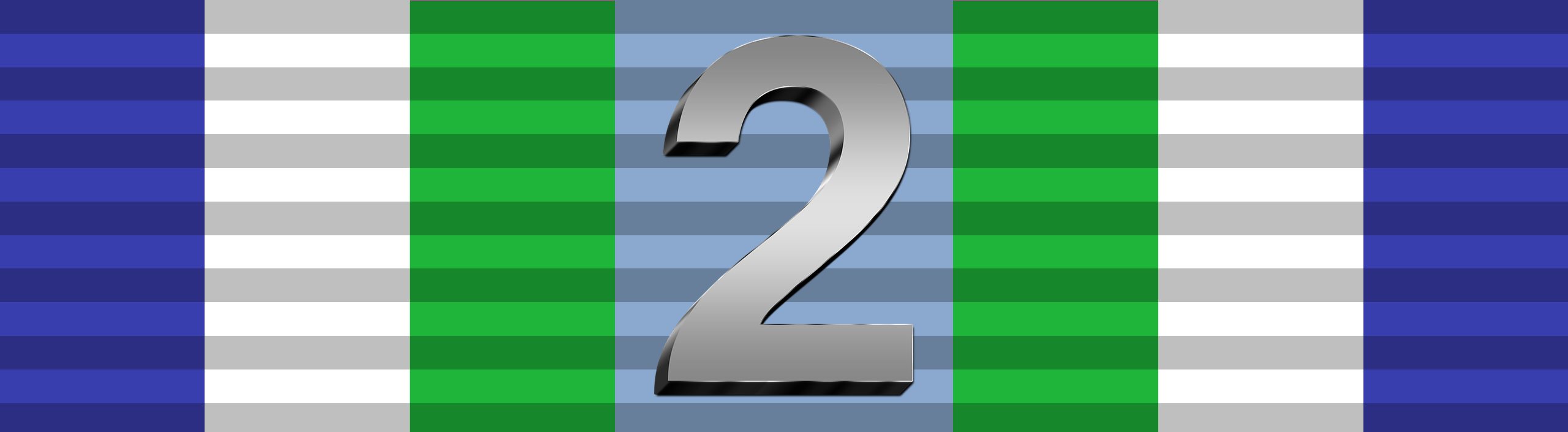

== Effective dates of promotion ==
Insignia	Rank	Date
	Lieutenant General	November 2019
	Major General	January 2016
	Brigadier	June 2010
	Lieutenant Colonel	September 2006
	Major	January 1998
	Captain	September 1993
	Lieutenant	April 1988
	Second Lieutenant	April 1987
