= Shahid Baig Mirza =

Pakistani military officer

Lieutenant General Shahid Baig Mirza
- شاهد بیگ مرزا

Commander V Corps Karachi
- In office 7 December 2016 – 25 August 2018
- Preceded by: Lt. Gen. Naveed Mukhtar
- Succeeded by: Lt. Gen. Humayun Aziz

Personal details
- Awards: Hilal-i-Imtiaz

Military service
- Allegiance: Pakistan
- Branch/service: Pakistan Army
- Years of service: 1984 - 2019
- Rank: Lt. Gen.
- Unit: 11th Punjab Regiment 27th Punjabis

Shahid Baig Mirza is a retired Pakistan Army general who served as a Commander of V Corps in Karachi. A three stars rank general of Pakistan Army, he was appointed as the commander of the corps on 7 December 2016.

== Early life ==
He was born into a military family of Mulhal Mughlan Chakwal District, he is the eldest of four brothers, three army officers and sons of Lieutenant Colonel (retd) Abdul Haq and Zaib-un-Nisa.

== Personal life ==
His youngest brother, Major Umar Baig Mirza, was martyred in a helicopter crash while performing rescue operations on 15 October 2005, and his other brother Lieutenant Colonel Amer Baig Mirza was in the ISI and was martyred in the Lahore terrorist attack on 27 May 2009.

== Military career ==
Then Major General Shahid Baig Mirza was the commandant of the Command and Staff College from January 2014 to May 2015. He was awarded the Hilal-i-Imtiaz on Pakistan Day, 23 March 2015 and was promoted to Lieutenant General in April 2015. Mirza served as Corps commander V Corps in Karachi following his promotion.
