= Sajjad Ghani =

Retired Pakistan Army general and former WAPDA chairman

Lieutenant General Sajjad Ghani HI(M)

Chairman, Water and Power Development Authority
- In office August 2022 – June 2025
- Preceded by: Muzammil Hussain
- Succeeded by: Naveed Asghar

Corps Commander, V Corps
- In office November 2013 – October,2014
- Preceded by: Muhammad Ijaz Chaudhry
- Succeeded by: Naveed Mukhtar

Military service
- Allegiance: Pakistan
- Branch/service: Pakistan Army
- Years of service: 1978 — 2016
- Rank: Lieutenant General
- Unit: Corps of Engineers
- Commands: Commander V Corps; Quartermaster General at General Headquarters

Sajjad Ghani, HI(M) is a retired three-star general of the Pakistan Army and former Chairman of the Water and Power Development Authority (WAPDA).

== Military career ==
Ghani was commissioned into the Pakistan Army in 1978 through the Pakistan Military Academy and joined the Corps of Engineers. He obtained a Bachelor's degree in Civil Engineering from the Military College of Engineering in 1984, followed by a Master's degree in Civil Engineering from UET Lahore in 1990.

Ghani commanded an Infantry Brigade and later 8th Infantry Division during the Second Battle of Swat. He was promoted to the rank of Major General in 2010. As a major general, he served as Vice Chief of General Staff. He was promoted to lieutenant general and appointed as Quartermaster General before taking over command of V Corps, Karachi in November 2013. As Corps Commander, he oversaw operational preparedness in southern Pakistan. He retired from military service in 2016.

== Post military career ==
On 12 August 2022, Ghani was appointed as the 23rd Chairman of WAPDA, succeeding Lt Gen (R) Muzammil Hussain. He was also appointed to the Board of Directors of Kot Addu Power Company (KAPCO) on 17 August 2022. In 2025, he announced the proposed plans to build more dams. As an aftermath of 2025 India–Pakistan conflict, he said that the organization has taken some major steps to expand its water & power storage amid India's breach to the Indus Waters Treaty.
