= Sarfraz Ali =

Pakistani general (1968–2022)

Lieutenant General Sarfraz Ali HI(M) TBt & Bar (Note: "Bar" refers to a second award of the same honour.)
- سرفراز علی
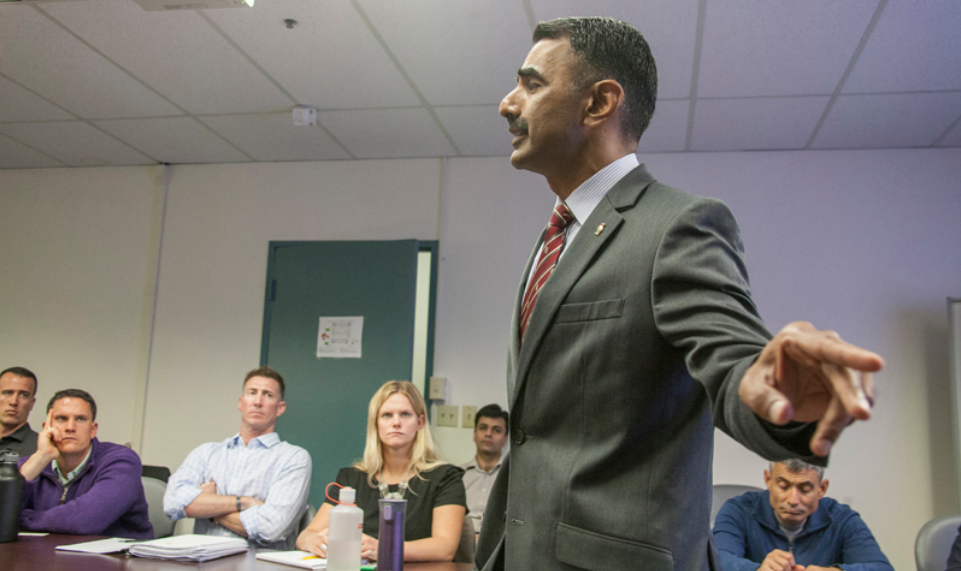
- Brigadier Ali addresses students of the Naval Postgraduate School, July 2016

Colonel Commandant Azad Kashmir Regiment
- In office 1 December 2021 – 1 August 2022

Corps Commander Quetta
- In office December 2020 – 1 August 2022
Preceding Commands
Inspector General Frontier Corps Balochistan (South)
In office
January 2020 – December 2020
Director General
Military Intelligence
In office
25 October 2018 – January 2020
Commandant
Command and Staff College Quetta
In office
January 2018 – 24 October 2018

Personal details
- Born: Chaudhary Sarfraz Ali; 1 December 1968 Sargodha, Pakistan
- Died: 1 August 2022 (aged 53) Lasbela District, Balochistan, Pakistan
- Cause of death: 2022 Pakistan Army helicopter incident
- Resting place: Shuhada Graveyard, Rawalpindi
- Spouse: Arifa Sarfraz (m. 1996)
- Children: 3
- Education: Pakistan Military Academy; Command and Staff College Quetta; Homs Military Academy; National Defence University, Pakistan; National University of Modern Languages

Military service
- Branch/service: Pakistan Army
- Years of service: 1989–2022
- Rank: Lieutenant General
- Unit: 6 Azad Kashmir Regiment
- Commands: AK Regiment; XII Corps; Military Intelligence; Frontier Corps Balochistan (South); 111th Infantry Brigade
- Battles/wars: United Nations Mission in Haiti; Insurgency in Khyber Pakhtunkhwa; First Battle of Swat; Operation Rah-e-Nijat; Operation Zarb-e-Azb; Insurgency in Balochistan
- Awards: See list

Lieutenant General Chaudhary Sarfraz Ali (Note: Urdu: چوہدری سرفراز علی) (psc, fsc(Sy), (l)qsl) (1 December 1968 – 1 August 2022) was a Pakistani three-star rank general who served as Corps Commander Quetta and Commander of the Azad Kashmir Regiment until his death in a helicopter crash.

== Early life ==
Chaudhary Sarfraz Ali was born in Sargodha, Punjab, Pakistan on 1 December 1968 to Squadron Leader Chaudhary Dewan Ali, who served in the Pakistan Air Force at PAF Base Sargodha and as an instructor at PAF College Sargodha. Sarfraz has four siblings, two brothers and two sisters. At the time of his death, it was reported that his mother was alive.

== Personal life ==
Sarfraz Ali married Arifa Sarfraz, the daughter of Major General Muhammad Arshad Chaudhary. They have two sons, Ahmed, Muhammad, and daughter Zainab. At the time of Sarfraz Ali's death, Ahmed, an officer in the Pakistan Army, held the rank of Captain and served as his Aide-de-camp. Though he was initially meant to be onboard, a lack of available seats prevented him from traveling with his father.

Just 10 days before the crash, Ali planned his daughter Zainab's wedding ceremony.

== Military career ==
At the age of 20, Sarfraz Ali was commissioned into the Pakistan Army in the 6 Azad Kashmir Regiment after completing the 79th Pakistan Military Academy course in March 1989. He had also studied at the Homs Military Academy.

Known for "leading from the front", Ali received his first Tamgha-e-Basalat in 2005 and second in 2008 for his gallantry in commanding Pakistani units during Operation Rah-e-Rast and Operation Zarb-e-Azb.

From 2012 to 2014, he commanded the 111th Infantry Brigade. He later served as Pakistan's defence attaché to Washington, D.C. from 2014 to 2017. In January 2018, he was appointed as Commandant of Command and Staff College Quetta. On 25 October 2018, he was appointed Director General of Military Intelligence.

He was appointed Commander of the XII Corps in December 2020, where he served until his death in August 2022.

=== Commander 111th Infantry Brigade ===
On 12 January 2012 when Sarfraz was promoted to Brigadier and appointed as the Commander of the 111th Infantry Brigade, the Pakistani Government, Pakistani media and Indian media speculated that a Coup d'état was about to take place due to Sarfraz's posting at a time when Prime Minister Gillani had accused Chief of Army Staff General Kayani and Director General ISI General Pasha of violating the constitution by submitting "illegal" replies against Zardari to the Supreme Court on the memogate scandal, which President Zardari sent to the White House begging the American Government to save him from the Pakistan Army. The rumors started by the government and media later turned out to be false as there was no Coup d'état and just a routine change of command.

While commanding the brigade, Brigadier Ali led the recovery efforts for the Bhoja Air Flight 213 which crashed in Rawalpindi on 20 April 2012.

During the 2014 Azadi March, he led a team of officers to disperse protestors from the Pakistan Awami Tehreek (PAT) and Pakistan Tehreek-e-Insaf (PTI) who were demonstrating outside the Pakistan Television Corporation headquarters against Nawaz Sharif and his government.

=== Defence attaché ===
Brigadier Ali served as Defence attaché to the Embassy of Pakistan, Washington, D.C. from 2014 to 2017.

In July 2016, he was invited to give a speech at the Naval Postgraduate School in California to the students of the schools National Security Affairs, South Asia curriculum, where he informed them about the efforts of the Pakistan Army against extremism, terrorism, and securing the AFG-PAK border. He was also known for being a cook as he would prepare breakfast for fellows/unit officers who arrived from Pakistan and were posted at the embassy.

While serving in this position, he was promoted to Major General on 9 February 2017.

=== DG ISI and Army Chief prospect ===
In October 2021, Major General Sarfraz Ali was among three generals interviewed by Prime Minister Imran Khan for the post of Director-General of Inter-Services Intelligence.

Sheikh Rasheed Ahmad stated in an interview that former Prime Minister Imran Khan wanted to appoint Lt. General Sarfraz Ali as Chief of Army Staff after General Bajwa's retirement.

== Legacy ==
According to The News International, Ali avoided publicity and never took credit for the work he did for Balochistan. In addition, he was an avid reader and his colleagues state that he was humble, open-minded, and easily accessible to civilian leaders.

He also focused on women's education and their skill development. He renovated several schools in the area, notably establishing two women cadet colleges in Quetta, and requested the local authorities and media to not credit or mention him for this work.

He helped famous Baloch folk singers Akhtar Chanal Zahri and Jangi Khan get free treatment in Combined Military Hospitals, Quetta.

Lt Col Ahmed Nawaz adds that whenever a Pakistani soldiers funeral was brought, Ali would lead the funeral prayer and his eyes would be filled with tears upon kissing the coffin of the soldier. His subordinates recall that Sarfraz was very kind towards them, always led from the front, and was known for being tough on soldiers who were slacking in their work.

== Helicopter crash ==
On 1 August 2022, Pakistan Army Aviation Corps Eurocopter AS350 Écureuil carrying six officers, including Sarfraz, Director General Pakistan Coast Guards Brigadier (approved Maj Gen) Amjad Hanif, Brigadier Muhammad Khalid, Pilot Major Saeed Ahmed, Co-Pilot Major Muhammad Talha Manan and Naik Mudassir Fayyaz (helicopter crew) went missing during flood relief operations in Balochistan, Pakistan. On 2 August 2022, the wreckage of the helicopter was found with no survivors.

=== Funeral ===
Their Janaza was offered in Quetta garrison on 3 August 2022, with the COAS, CJCSC, and other high ranking army officers and politicians attending. Sarfraz was buried in Shuhada graveyard in Rawalpindi.

== Reactions ==
=== Domestic ===
- Pakistan — Chairman PTI and former Prime Minister Imran Khan offered his condolences to the families of all the victims on Twitter, stating that he had found Sarfraz Ali to be “a thorough professional and an upright, honest human being.” Khan visited the home of Sarfraz on 6 August 2022 to offer condolences.
- Pakistan — Journalist Arshad Sharif tweeted, “Praying to Allah to protect and save the brave sons of Pakistan 🇵🇰 Lt Gen Sarfraz Ali, Mj Gen Amjad, Engr Cmdr Brig Khalid, Maj Saeed (Pilot), Maj Talha (Co-Pilot), Naik Mudassir. Allah let there be a miracle to save them. Ameen.”
- Pakistan — Prime Minister of Pakistan tweeted, "Nation is deeply grieved on the martyrdom of Lt. General Sarfraz Ali & 5 other officers of Pakistan Army. They were doing a sacred duty of providing relief to flood affectees. Will remain eternally indebted to these sons of soil. My heartfelt condolences to the bereaved families!" He visited the home of Sarfraz to offer condolences on 17 August 2022.

=== International ===
United Arab Emirates — On 5 August 2022, a statement released by the media wing of the United Arab Emirates Army, said that President of the UAE Mohamed bin Zayed Al Nahyan expressed "his deepest condolences of the tragic loss of precious lives due to the crash."

Saudi Arabia — On 6 August 2022, Chairman of the General Staff of Saudi Arabia Fayyadh Al Ruwaili, expressed his "deepest condolences" on a phone call with military leadership.

United States — On 19 August 2022, Pakistan's Ambassador to the United States Masood Khan, told reporters that the United States Department of Defense and Department of State expressed their condolences over the losses. He went on to say that Sarfraz was an extremely humane and kind-hearted person who always helped the needy and was also popular in Washington.

== Memorials ==
On 3 November 2022, the first Lt Gen Sarfraz Ali Shaheed Junior Tennis Tournament was held in Lahore which was hosted by tournament director Inam-ul-Haq.

On 13 December 2022, the first Lt. General Sarfraz Shaheed Football Tournament was held in Loralai, Balochistan with the aim of the tournament to promote sports culture in the area.

== Awards and decorations ==

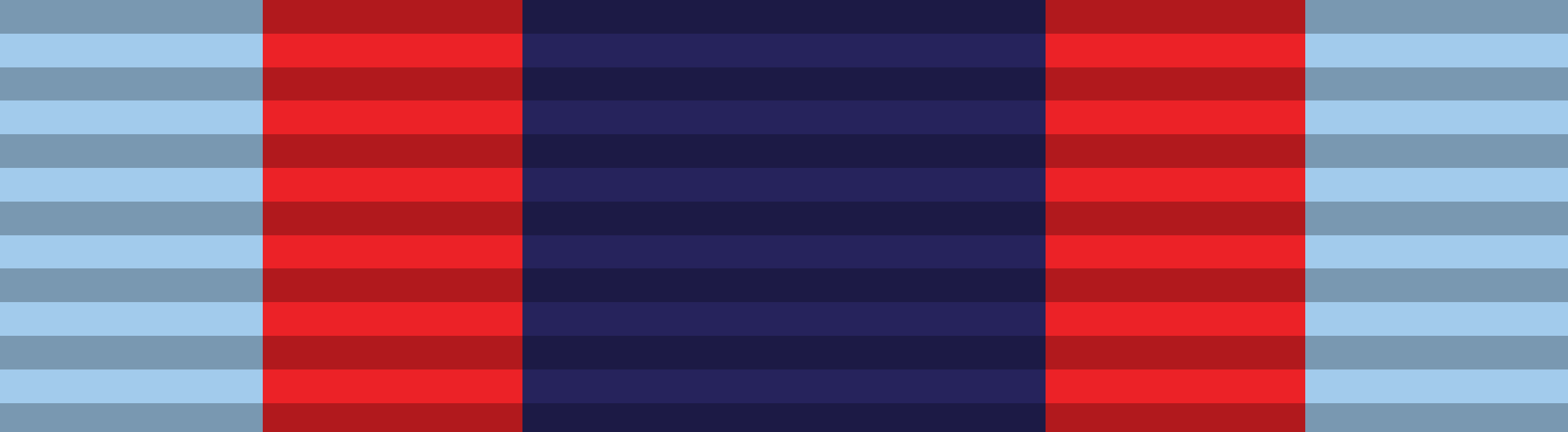

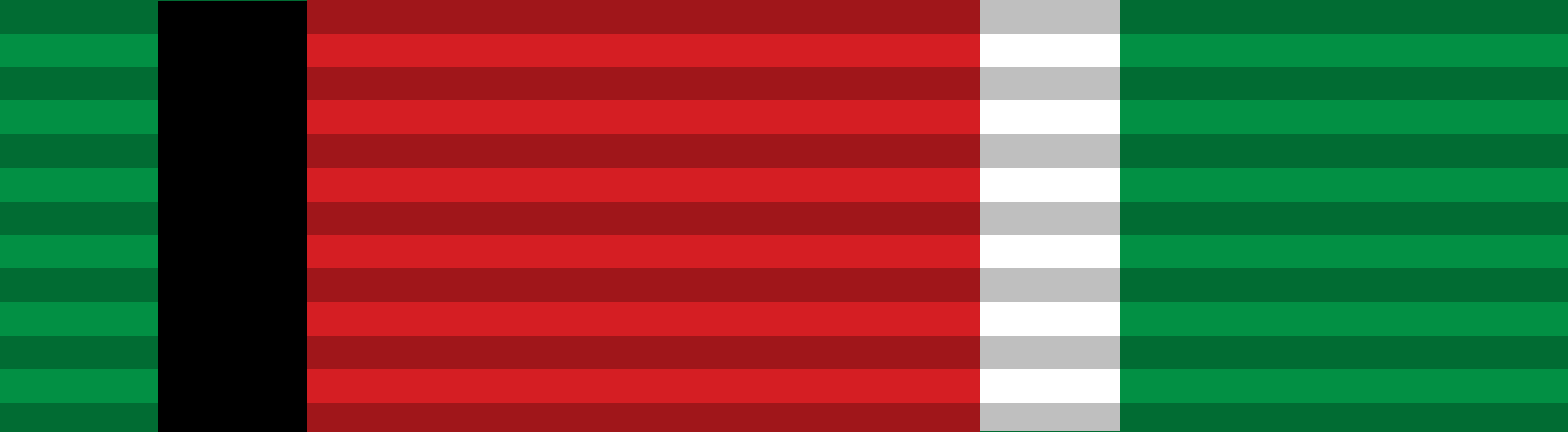

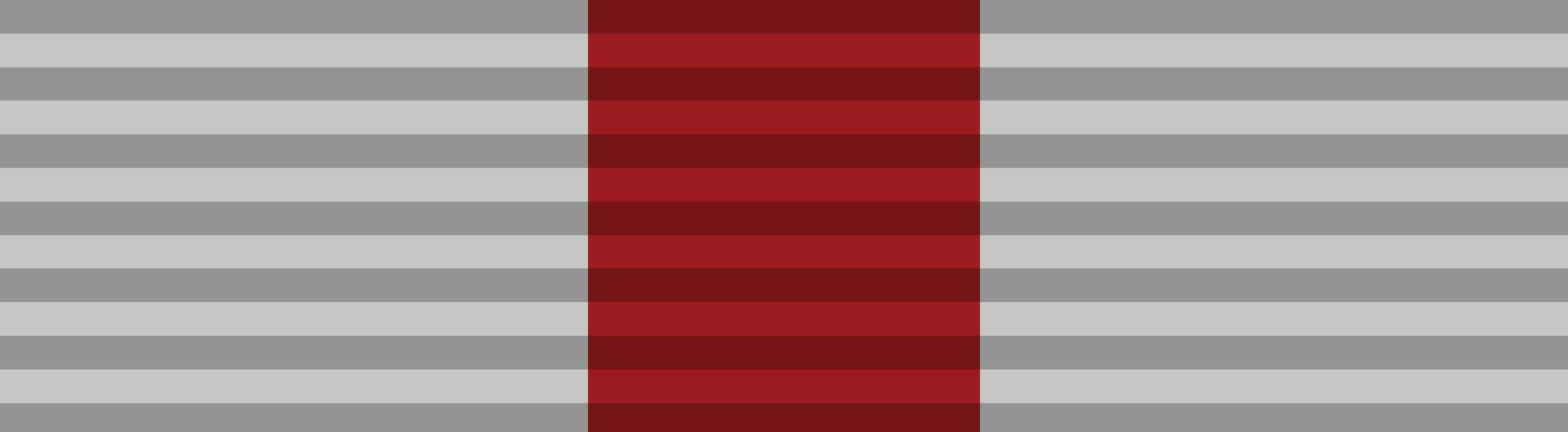

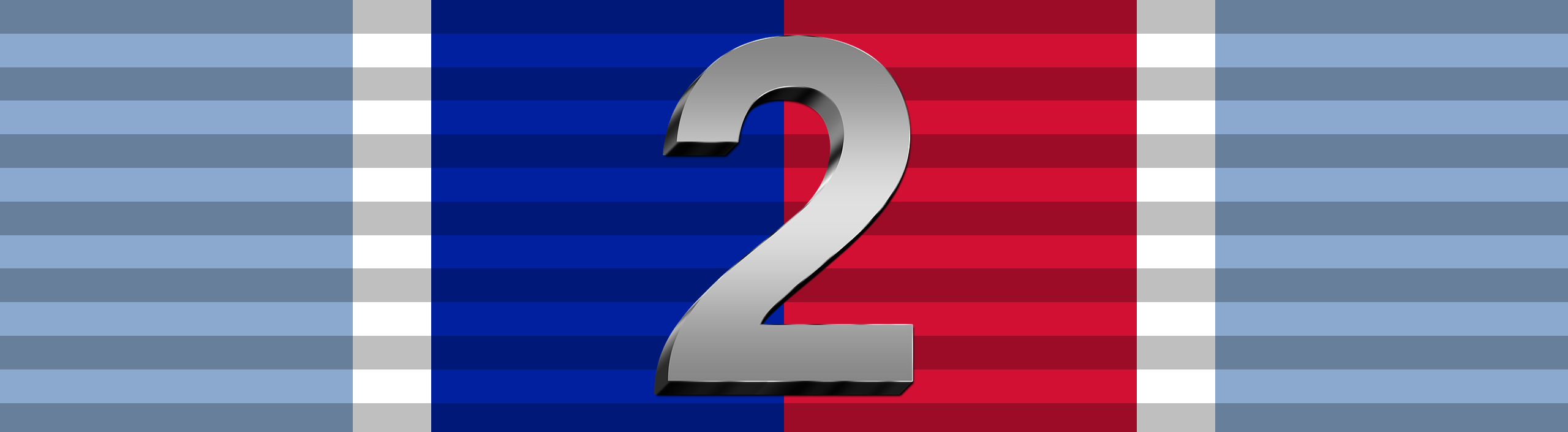

| Hilal-i-Imtiaz (Military) (Crescent of Excellence) (2020) | | Tamgha-e-Basalat & Bar (Medal of Valour) (2005 & 2008) | |
| Tamgha-e-Baqa (Nuclear Test Medal) 1998 | Tamgha-e-Istaqlal Pakistan (Escalation with India Medal) 2002 | Tamgha-e-Azm (Medal of Conviction) (2018) | 10 Years Service Medal |
| 20 Years Service Medal | 30 Years Service Medal | Tamgha-e-Jamhuriat (Democracy Medal) 1988 | Qarardad-e-Pakistan Tamgha (Resolution Day Golden Jubilee Medal) 1990 |
| Tamgha-e-Salgirah Pakistan (Independence Day Golden Jubilee Medal) 1997 | Command and Staff College Quetta Student's Medal | United Nations UNMIH Medal (2 Deployments) | Commendation Medal (United States) |

=== Foreign decorations ===
Foreign Awards
| United Nations | UNMIH Medal |
| USA | Commendation Medal |
