= Tanveer Naqvi =

Pakistani general

Lieutenant General Syed Tanveer Hussain Naqvi
- Military career
- Allegiance: Pakistan
- Branch: Pakistan Army
- Rank: Lieutenant General

Syed Tanveer Hussain Naqvi is a retired three-star general of Pakistan Army. A close aide of Pervez Musharraf, he was the former head of the National Reconstruction Bureau of Pakistan.
