= National Defence University (Pakistan) =

Military university in Islamabad, Pakistan

- Urdu: جامعہ قومی دفاعِ پاکستان
- Seal of the NDU
- Former name: National Defence College
- Motto: Arabic: عَلَّمَ الْإِنْسَانَ مَا لَمْ يَعْلَمْ (al-Quran (30:96:5))
- Motto in English: "taught man which he knew not"
- Type: Military
- Established: 28 May 1970; 56 years ago
- Affiliations: Pakistan Command and Staff College; Pakistan Naval War College; PAF Air War College
- Academic affiliations: Higher Education Commission
- Chancellor: President of Pakistan
- President: Lieutenant general Rahat Naseem Ahmed Khan
- Vice-president: Rear admiral Javaid Iqbal
- Dean: Professor Dr. Arshi Saleem Hashmi
- Students: 4,000
- Undergraduates: 3000
- Postgraduates: 500
- Doctoral students: 100
- Location: Islamabad, Islamabad Capital Territory, Pakistan
- Campus: Urban
- Language: English, Urdu
- Colors: Green, White, Khaki
- Website: www.ndu.edu.pk

The National Defence University (NDU), formerly introduced as Army War Course (1963–70), (Note: AWC was a military faculty, not an independent institute. It was introduced to Command and Staff College, and represents historical concept responsible for the origin of NDU. It is now a component of NDU known as National Security and War Course.) the National Defence College (1970–2007), is the military university of the Islamic Republic of Pakistan focused on military education and training for the armed forces, including Pakistan military forces and two hundred foreign participants. Formerly established on 28 May 1970 at Rawalpindi, its academic principles are focused on command instructions, national security, military strategy, and war studies among other specified academic disciplines. It is one of the oldest military education and training institutes in the country with additional enrollments reserved for the civil servants.

Major general, then-general Abdul Hamid Khan served as its first commandant, while brigadier Muhammad Ahmed was appointed the first chief instructor. The president of the Islamic Republic of Pakistan serves its chancellor while the chief of staff recommends appointment and the removal of its president, usually a three star armed officer. Nearly 44 years later of its establishment as Armed War Course, it was awarded the status of university after being recognised by the Higher Education Commission of Pakistan on 5 February 2007 while the former Armed War Course (later re-designated as Armed War Forces Course) became one of its components.

== History ==
The origin of the National Defence University is historically associated with major general, the then lieutenant general, Sahabzada Yaqub Khan and Command and Staff College who introduced Army War Course on 1 May 1963 to Command and Staff College after he was asked in 1962 to establish a separate and a single purpose war course to that college. It initially comprised twelve participants (known as students and faculty members), including two from armed forces – one from navy and other from air force. With the continuation of war studies, its participants were increased to sixteen in 1965. However, staff college was left without war course faculty following the 1965 conflict between India and Pakistan. The discontinuation of the faculty gained attention of the authorities, and the National Defence College (NDC), a stand-alone institute was established on 28 May 1970 at Lalkurti area of Rawalpindi Cantonment. It was housed in the Ayub Hall of the old National Assembly Building. The institute was later shifted to its permanent building where it worked for nearly 25 years.

During that 25 years, the college was re-designated multiple times, including in 1971 when the Army War Course was awarded the status of the Armed Forces War Course to serve for armed forces than only army. The number of faculty participants were increased from sixteen to twenty, with three officers from navy and air force.

To award the officers MSc degree in war studies, the prime minister, Zulfiqar Ali Bhutto signed an order in 1975 to affiliate the NDC with Federal University of Islamabad (in modern-day Quaid-i-Azam University). Five years later of affiliation with Quaid university, military dictator Muhammad Zia-ul-Haq, the then 6th president of Pakistan signed an order in February 1980 to shift the college to the capital city Islamabad for its space expansion. Following that order, it was shifted to the new building on 17 August 1995.

The government of Pakistan upgraded it to university in 2007, while the Naval War College gained the status of Armed Forces War College, which is now a component of the National Defence University. As of March 2007, the NDU acts as a nation university in the country, and the two years later of its upgradation, Joint Chiefs of Staff Committee redesignated both Army War Course, Armed Forces War Course, and National Defence Course faculties into one single component of the university, which is now known as National Security and War Course.

== Buildings and sites ==
National Defence University building

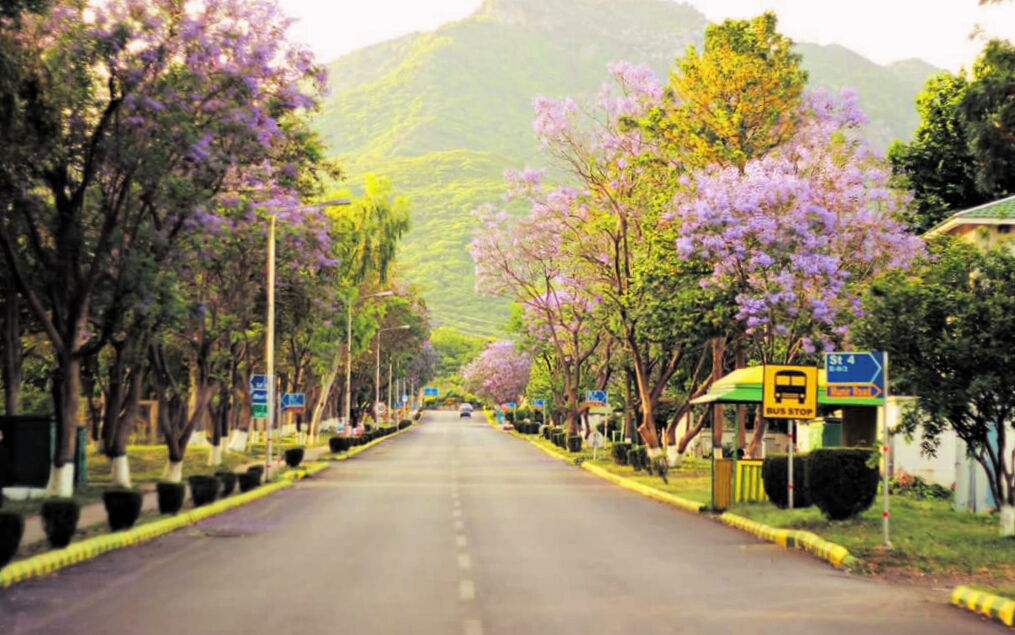
E-9 Sector, Islamabad

Since its formation as a faculty and then college in Rawalpindi, it was shifted several times from one building to other, including the old national assembly near Rawalpindi Cantonment until it was permanently shifted to Islamabad in 1995. The main building is now located in Sector E-9, Islamabad near Margalla Hills.

== Emblem ==
The emblem (generally identified as logo, although the official description of emblem do not mention "logo") of the NDU depicts the concept of national security, defence and ideological foundation of the organisation, consisting an Islamic shield with three-service colors, encircled by a black border with silver edges. It is surrounded by a golden wreath with a star and crescent presented on the top of emblem. It is placed on a green background, depicting the national color of Pakistan. The lower portion of the Islamic shield is occupied by the two swords placed in the form of crossed sword and a pen, which occupies the upper portion. The pen and crossed sword and their placements represent "honour, strength and achievement through learning".

The motto is inscribed inside the shield which is placed on top centre printed in gold letters.

== Composition ==
Organizational structure of the National Defence University

The National Defence University consists two heads – the president of Pakistan who acts as chancellor and a three star military officers, usually a lieutenant general or a vice admiral who acts a president of the university, sometimes referred to as commandant university. The organisation consist four main faculties/branches such as Faculty of Security Studies (FSS), Faculty of Contemporary Studies (FCS), Institute for Strategic Studies, Research & Analysis (ISSRA), and National War Gaming Center (NWGC). The academic administration of FSS and FCS are headed by a dean.

=== Faculty of Security Studies ===
The National Security College, Armed Forces War College, and Allied Officers Division (AOD) are headed by two star officer that works under FSS faculty. Its academic discipline is focused on national security and its elements, in addition to military, operational, and nuclear strategies. It also involves in preparedness of command and staff assignments.

=== Faculty of Contemporary Studies ===
The FCS awards academic degrees to the participants. It includes five departments such as Leadership and Management Studies (LMS) – which awards bachelor's degree, master of philosophy, master's in project management, and doctor of philosophy. The Government and Public Policy (GPP) awards same degrees as to LMS, however, it is focused on government and public policy and also excludes master's in project management. Economics (ECO) – which awards bachelor's degree, and master of philosophy. The Strategic Studies (SS), International Relations (IR), and Peace and Conflict Studies (PCS) award the officers same degrees as to GPP, however their branches of studies varied.

=== Institute for Strategic Studies, Research & Analysis ===
The ISSRA organization is headed by a two star officer who acts a director general. It is further divided into seven branches such as Global and Regional Studies, Internal Studies, Defence Studies, Coord & Collaboration, Research & Publication, Keystone Capstone & Pinnacle Program, and Sahabzada Yaqub Khan (SYK) library. At staff, ISSRA is primarily focused on seminars, discussions, conferences, visiting briefings, and to interact with think tanks within the country.

=== National War Gaming Center ===
The National War Gaming Center (NWGC) do not have other branches likewise FCC or FCS. Based on strategic thinking, it was created to run wargames focused on to execute military operation plans, disaster, and emergency management. It uses the NATO-based computer network to execute military tactics.

=== Libraries ===
Its digital library consists print material from 70,000 books, periodicals, contemporary journals, pamphlets, government and daily newspaper publications. One of its major print material resources is Higher Education Commission of the country. It has also a fictional library which consists data from books, concerning women and children.

Its mapping section is intended for the creation of maps, and draughtsmen or other persons specialized in that area participates in that section designed for the production of graphic works.

== Academic profile ==
=== Teaching and degrees ===
The National Defence University's contemporary studies faculty award bachelor's, master of philosophy and doctorate degrees in various academic fields such as international relations, and public policy among others.

Faculty of Contemporary Studies

- ECONOMICS (ECO)
  - BS
  - M.Phill
  - Ph.D
- Leadership and Management Studies (LMS)
  - BS
  - M.Phil
  - MS-PM
  - Ph.D
- Government and Public Policy (GPP)
  - BS
  - M.Phill
  - Ph.D
- Strategic Studies (SS)
  - BS
  - M.Phill
  - Ph.D
- International Relations (IR)
  - BS
  - M.Phill
  - Ph.D
- Peace and Conflict Studies (PCS)
  - BS
  - M.Phill
  - Ph.D

== Role as a think tank ==
The NDU's wing Institute for Strategic Studies, Research & Analysis (ISSRA) acts as a national think tank on national security matters, and is reportedly an internal part of the National Security Division, headed by a national security division secretary. Inputs are provided to the government and armed forces to maintains academic links with domestic and foreign think tanks and defence universities with which Pakistan shares friendly relations.

== Amendments ==
The parliament of Pakistan introduced an act in 2011 titled National Defence University, Act 2011, outlining the academic, administration, and financial amendments, in addition to establishment of the NDU. It was formerly signed by the president on 14 May 2011 after majlis-ash-shura such as the national assembly and the senate passed the bill. It functions under that act, however employing officers, teacher and other staff members are sanctioned by the Higher Education Commission Ordinance, 2002. The act restrict government and other authorities to qualify or disqualify the officers, teachers, students, or any other participant associated with the university, on the grounds of their "gender, religion, race, creed, class, colour, or domicile".

The act identifies the chancellor, president, dean, commandant (director general), chairperson (chief instructor), registrar, controller examination, director administration and director finance as the principal officers and also determines their powers and the functions.

=== Appointments ===
The act allows the president of Pakistan to act as the chancellor, while the president of the university is recommended by the chief of army staff for the final approval of the chancellor. If the post of university president falls vacant due to any uncertainty such as health complications or death, it is not assumed by the other members with an additional charge of the president. The post is generally assumed for the term of five years, however the incumbent may be terminated if recommended by the army chief.

== List of presidents/commandants ==
No.	President/Commandant		Term		
No.	Portrait	Name	Took office	Left office	Term length
President of the National Defence University
1	Abdul Hameed Khan	Lt Gen. Abdul Hameed Khan (1917–1984)	19 July 1970	7 December 1970	141 days
2	Nasir Ahmad Chaudhri	Major General; Nasir Ahmad Chaudhri (1920–2010)	3 April 1972	19 July 1974	2 years, 107 days
3	M. Rahim Khan	Major General; M. Rahim Khan	20 July 1974	31 August 1975	1 year, 42 days
4	Michael John O'Brian	AVM; Michael John O'Brian (1928–1995)	1 September 1975	9 April 1976	221 days
5	Azmat B. Awan	Lt Gen. Azmat B. Awan	9 April 1976	30 October 1978	2 years, 204 days
6	Anwar Masood	Major General; Anwar Masood	1 October 1978	1 September 1979	335 days
7	Ejaz Azim	Lt Gen. Ejaz Azim	10 September 1979	9 April 1980	212 days
8	Nishat Ahmed	Major General; Nishat Ahmed	10 April 1980	20 June 1984	4 years, 71 days
9	S M H Bokhari	Lt Gen. S M H Bokhari	21 June 1984	4 January 1988	3 years, 197 days
10	Muhammad Safdar	Lt Gen. Muhammad Safdar (1934–2023)	5 January 1988	31 July 1989	1 year, 207 days
11	Zakir Ali Zaidi	Lt Gen. Zakir Ali Zaidi	1 August 1989	18 June 1990	321 days
12	Rehmdil Bhatti	Lt Gen. Rehmdil Bhatti	8 September 1990	9 February 1993	2 years, 154 days
13	Asad Durrani	Lt Gen. Asad Durrani (born 1941)	10 February 1993	14 May 1993	93 days
14	Iftikhar Ali Khan	Lt Gen. Iftikhar Ali Khan (1941–2009)	15 May 1993	17 June 1993	33 days
15	Syed Tanveer Hussain Naqvi	Lt Gen. Syed Tanveer Hussain Naqvi	18 June 1994	31 January 1996	1 year, 227 days
16	Muhammad Maqbool	Lt Gen. Muhammad Maqbool	1 February 1996	4 June 1998	2 years, 123 days
17	Mahmud Ahmed	Lt Gen. Mahmud Ahmed	5 June 1998	25 October 1998	142 days
18	Salahuddin Tirmizi	Lt Gen. Salahuddin Tirmizi	25 October 1998	2 March 2000	1 year, 129 days
19	Saeed Uz Zafar	Lt Gen. Saeed Uz Zafar	13 March 2000	29 October 2000	230 days
20	Javed Hassan	Lt Gen. Javed Hassan	30 October 2000	3 January 2004	3 years, 65 days
21	Tariq Waseem Ghazi	Lt Gen. Tariq Waseem Ghazi	3 January 2004	16 October 2004	287 days
22	Shahid Hamid	Lt Gen. Shahid Hamid	17 October 2004	4 November 2005	1 year, 18 days
23	Raza Muhammad Khan	Lt Gen. Raza Muhammad Khan	7 November 2005	30 June 2007	1 year, 235 days
24	Muhammad Hamid Khan	Lt Gen. Muhammad Hamid Khan	1 July 2007	11 October 2009	2 years, 102 days
25	Muhammad Yousaf	Lt Gen. Muhammad Yousaf	12 October 2009	15 September 2010	338 days
26	Agha Muhammad Umer Farooq	Lt Gen. Agha Muhammad Umer Farooq	8 October 2010	21 July 2012	1 year, 287 days
27	Nasser Khan Janjua	Lt Gen. Nasser Khan Janjua	30 July 2012	26 August 2013	1 year, 27 days
28	Javed Iqbal Ramday	Lt Gen. Javed Iqbal Ramday	26 August 2013	30 April 2015	1 year, 247 days
29	Anwar Ali Hyder	Lt Gen. Anwar Ali Hyder	1 May 2015	10 April 2016	345 days
30	Nazir Ahmed Butt	Lt Gen. Nazir Ahmed Butt	11 April 2016	19 December 2016	252 days
31	Rizwan Akhtar	Lt Gen. Rizwan Akhtar	20 December 2016	9 October 2017	293 days
32	Majid Ehsan	Lt Gen. Majid Ehsan	24 October 2017	14 December 2018	1 year, 51 days
33	Aamer Riaz	Lt Gen. Aamer Riaz	15 December 2018	4 October 2019	293 days
34	Muhammad Saeed	Lt Gen. Muhammad Saeed	28 November 2019	7 November 2021	1 year, 344 days
35	Nauman Mehmood	Lt Gen. Nauman Mehmood	23 November 2021	24 April 2023	1 year, 152 days
36	Rahat Naseem Ahmed Khan	Lt Gen. Rahat Naseem Ahmed Khan	03 May 2023	30 November 2023	211 days
37	Asif Ghafoor	Lt Gen. Asif Ghafoor	1 December 2023	22 December 2024	1 year, 21 days
38	Babar Iftikhar	Lt Gen. Babar Iftikhar	22 January 2025	11 October 2026	1 year, 262 days
39	Rahat Naseem Ahmed Khan	Lt Gen. Rahat Naseem Ahmed Khan	12 October 2026	Incumbent	39 days

== Notable alumni ==
Throughout its history from a college to university, some of its alumni and faculty members became notable in academic, politics, military and many other varied fields.

Pakistani generals who attended the National Defence University

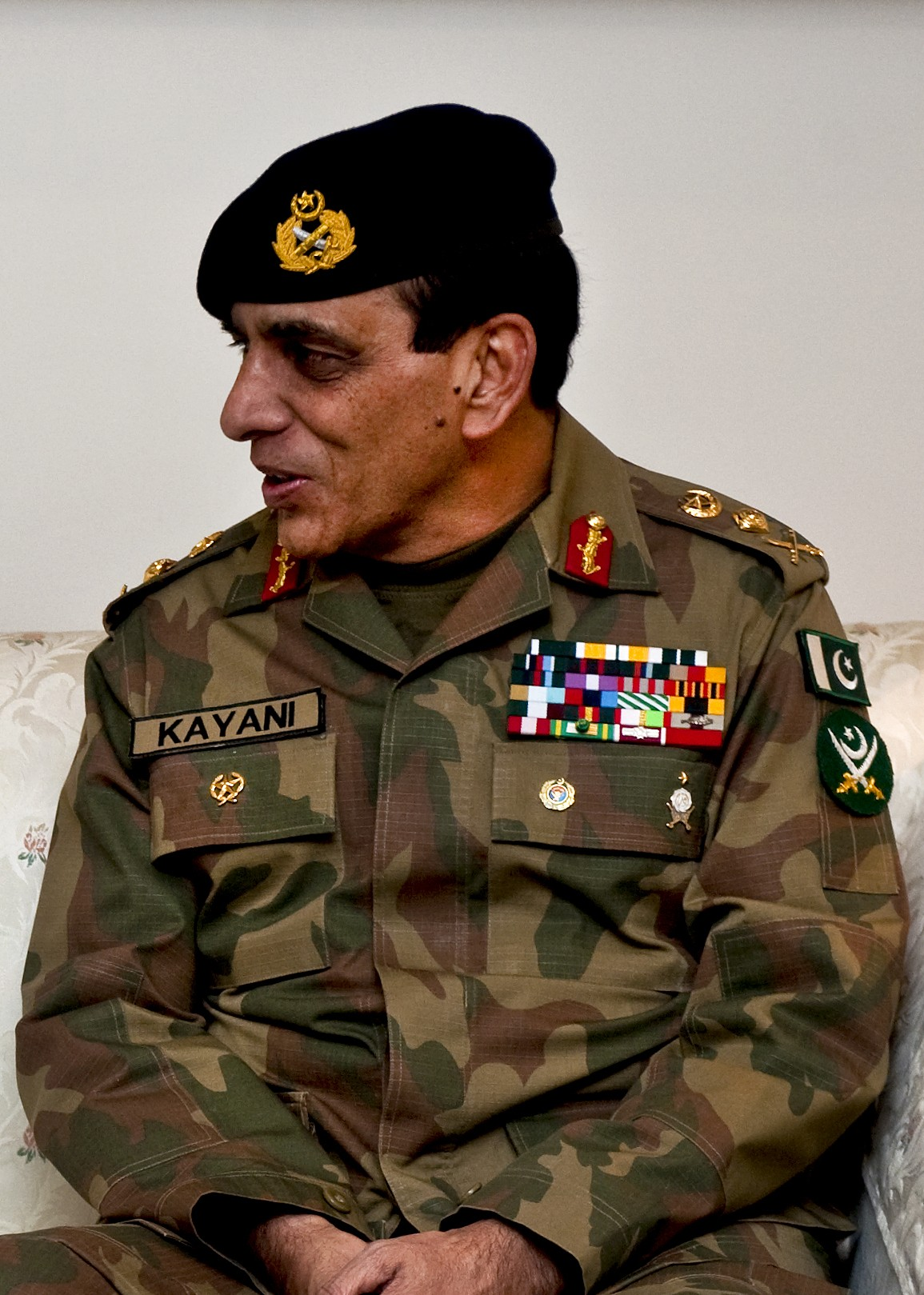
Ashfaq Parvez Kayani

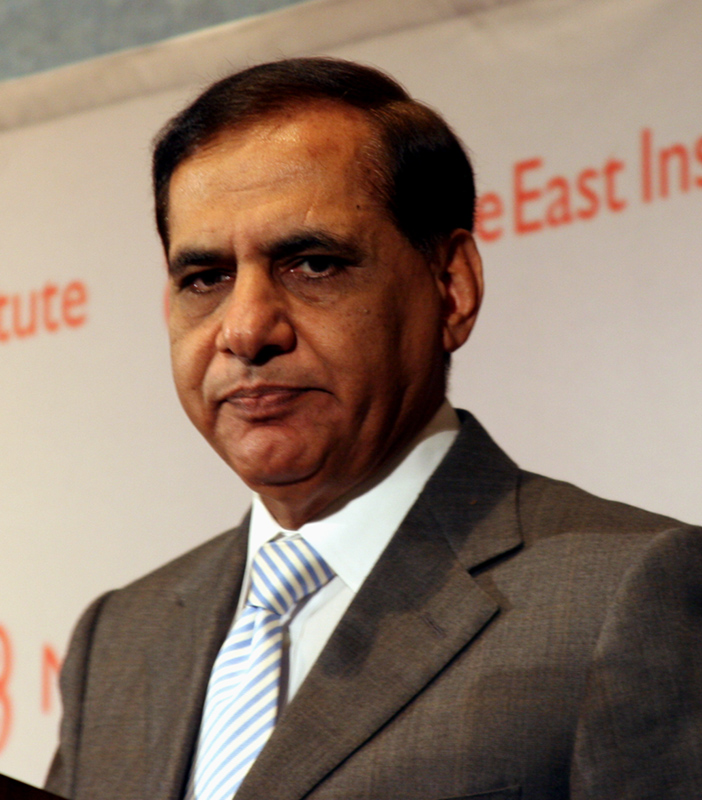
Ehsan ul Haq

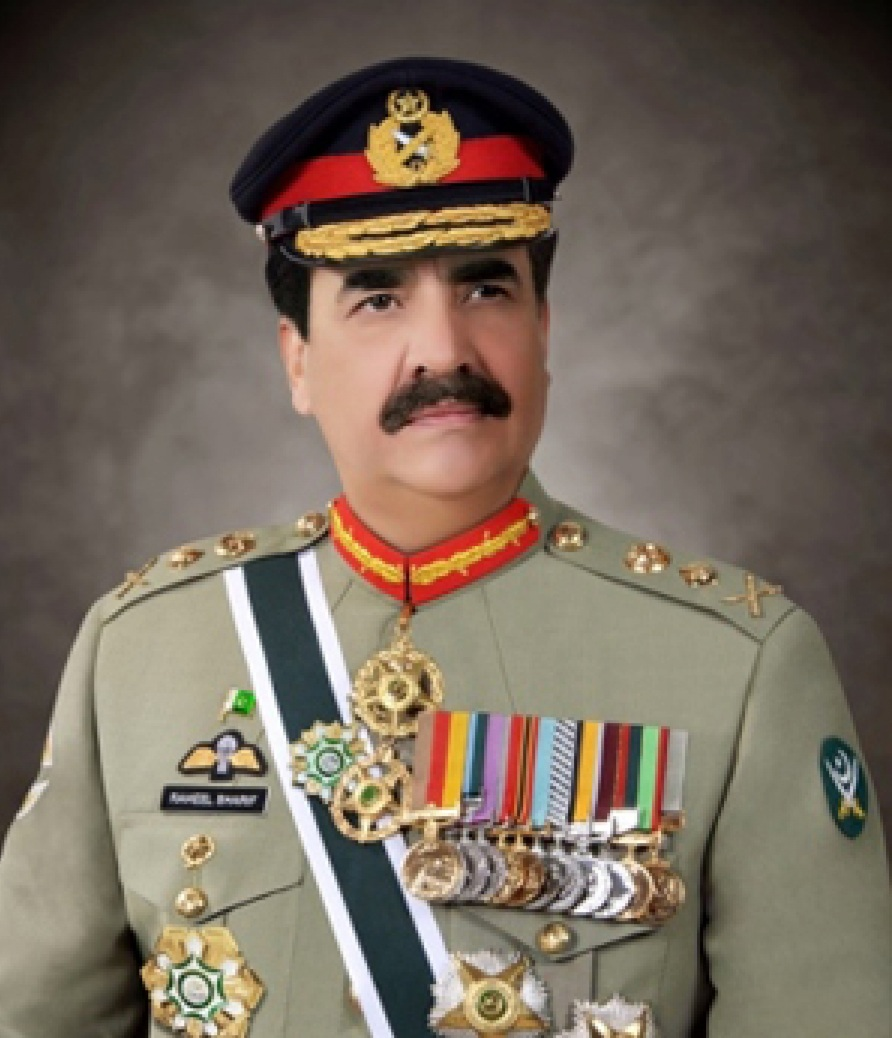
Raheel Sharif

Pakistani politicians who attended the National Defence University
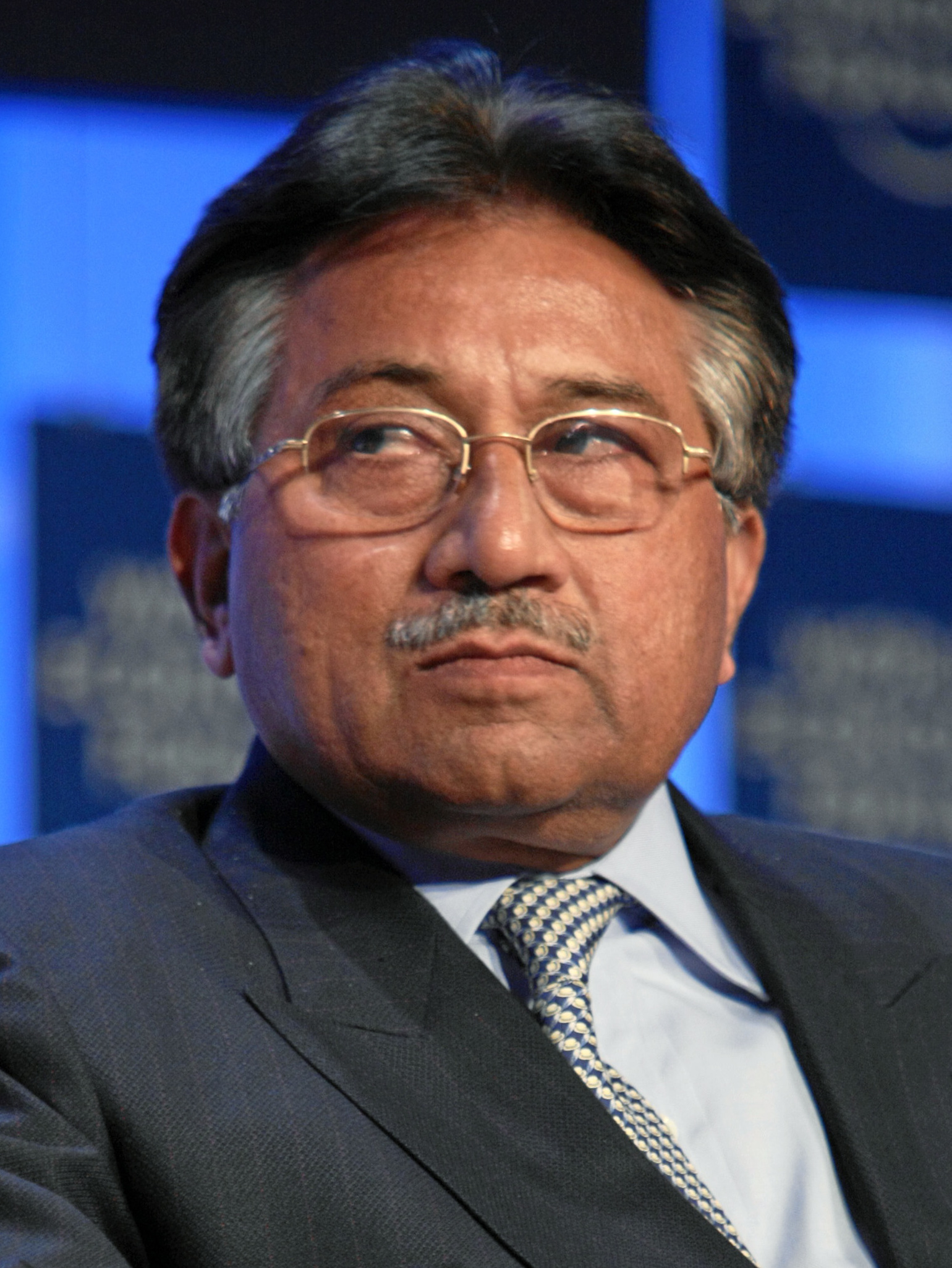
Pervez Musharraf

Many Pakistani generals, including Ashfaq Parvez Kayani, Ehsan ul Haq, and Raheel Sharif attended the National Defence University. Kayani graduated from National Defence College and also remained faculty member of the university. Ehsan ul Haq graduated from NDU and Command and Staff College, Quetta, an affiliated institute of the university. Raheel Sharif is among the other generals who attended the university.

Pakistani admirals who attended the National Defence University

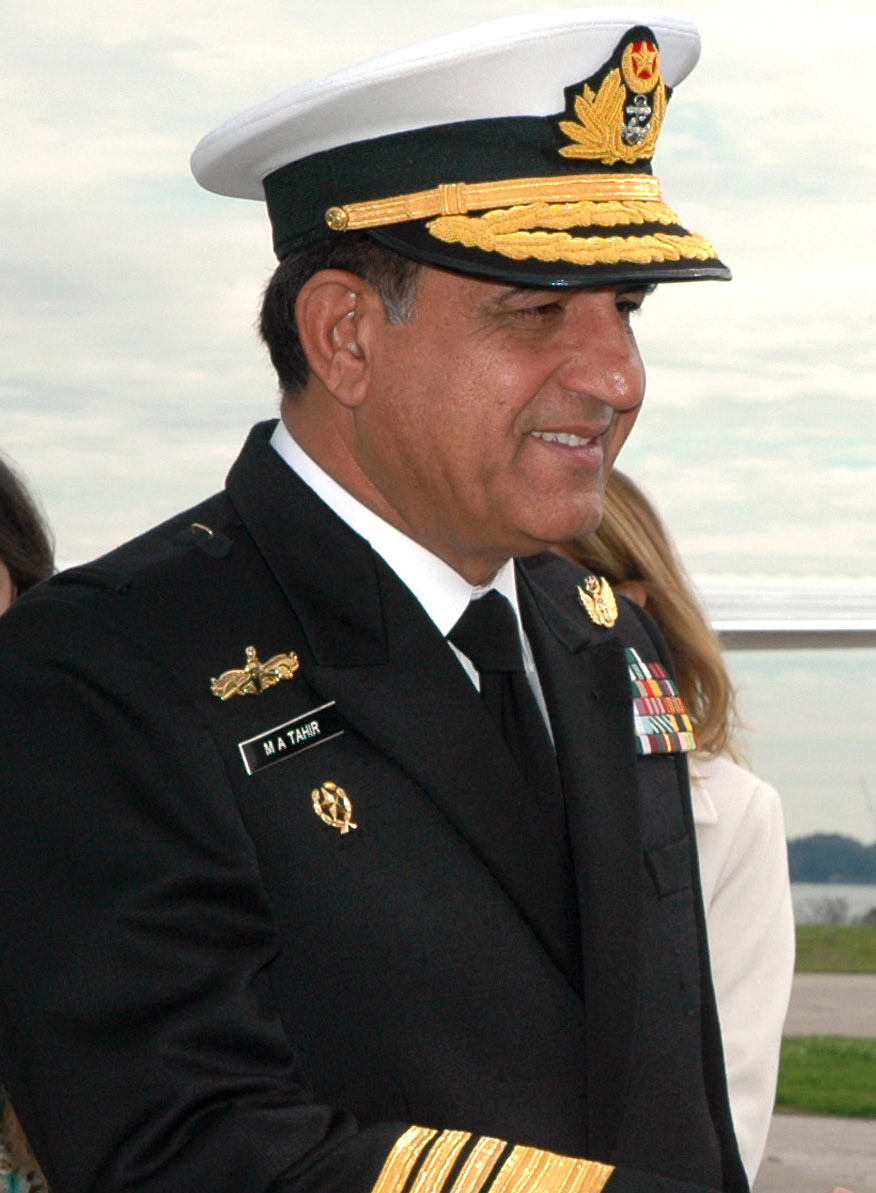
Afzal Tahir

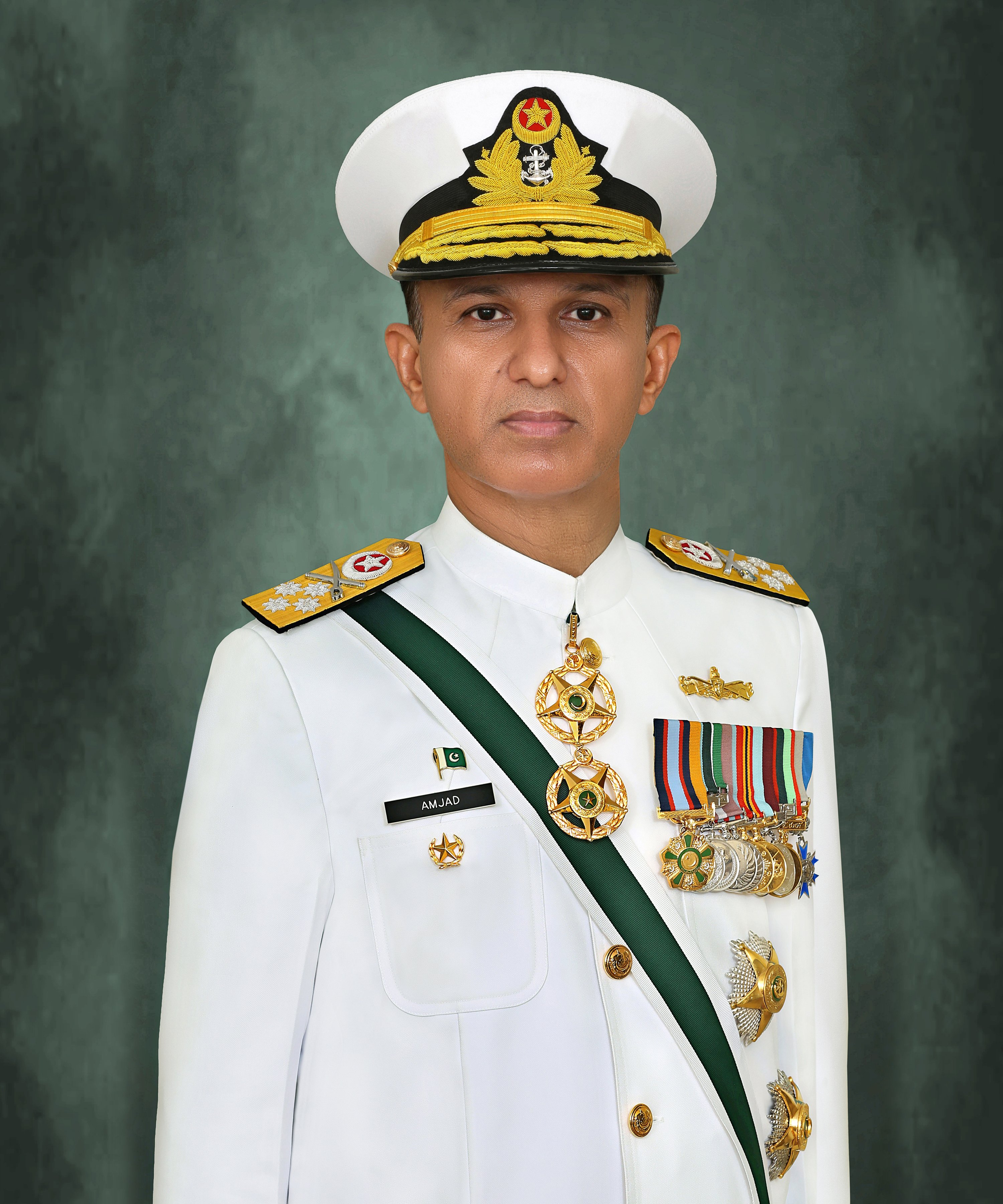
Amjad Khan Niazi

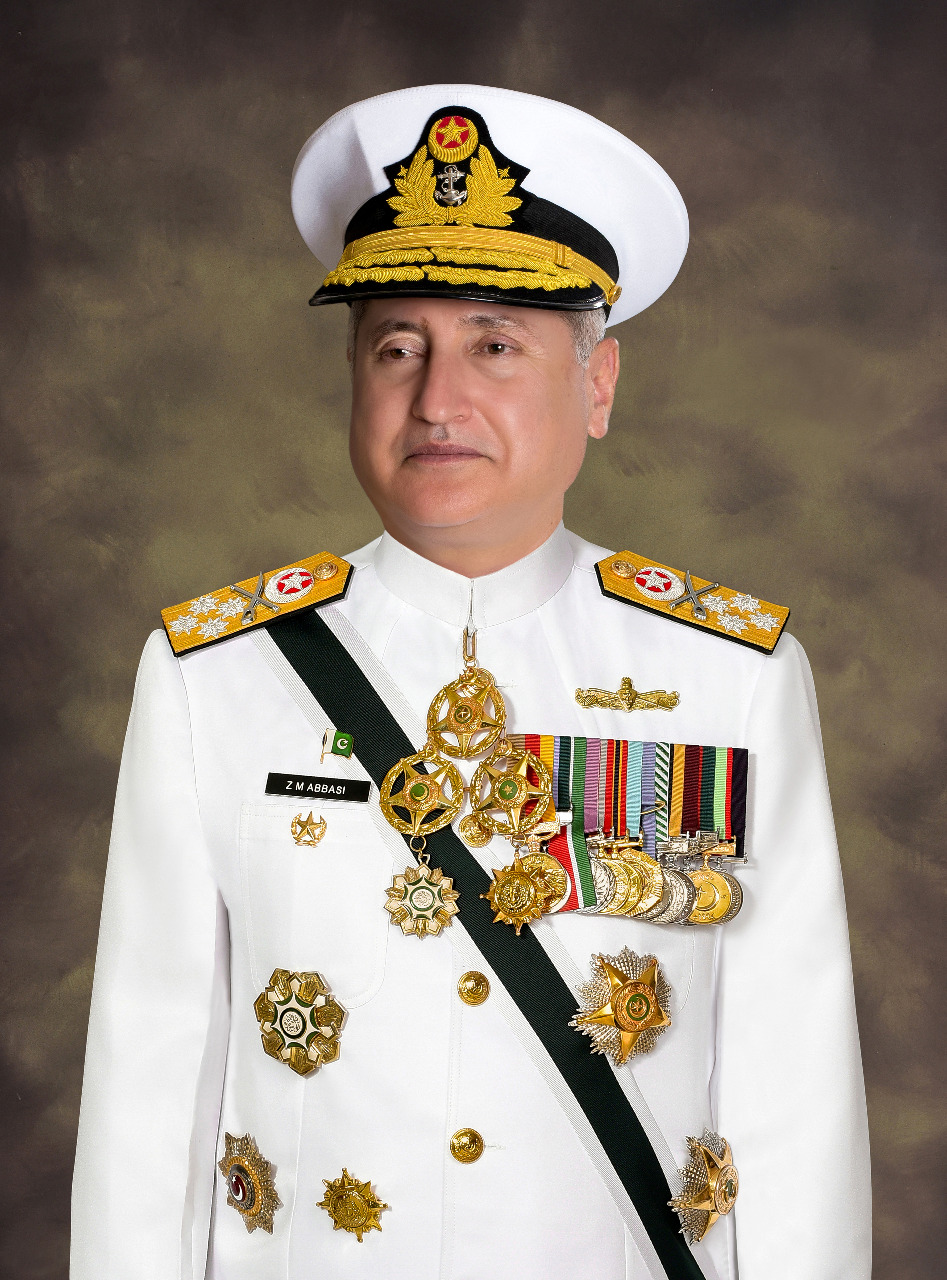
Zafar Mahmood Abbasi

In addition to Pakistani generals, some alumni from the naval department became notable in their respective fields. Admiral Afzal Tahir graduated from the National Defence College, while Shahid Karimullah, attended armed forces war course department of the National Defence College. Zafar Mahmood Abbasi is also an alumnus of the university while Amjad Khan Niazi graduated from NDU and Command and Staff College.

Musharraf, the 10th president of Pakistan graduated from the National Defence College and Command and Staff College, Quetta, an affiliated institute of NDU.

== Publications ==
- NDU Journal is an annual feature of the university which is based on the research papers by the students, researchers, and policy makers. The publications provide ideas on issues of national security of Pakistan. Before an article is published in the journal, it is single peer reviewed.
  - Margalla Papers is biannual publication, concerning contemporary global politics, globalization, foreign policy, strategic alliance, economic partnerships, and regional organization. It also involves the role of United Nations peacekeeping, law of nations and global commons.
  - ISSRA Paper is an annual academic publication of Institute for Strategic Studies, Research and Analysis (ISSRA). It cover the issues relating governance, public policy, in addition to promotion of awareness to that issues. It is contributed by anyone, however articles are single peer-reviewed before they appear in journal.
    - NDU Monograph is a scholarly journal of ISSRA. It is contributed by the researchers on military issues and collaboration.
  - AFWC Journal is a journal of Armed Force War Course which publishes the public opinions contributed by the participants.

== See also ==
- Military academies in Pakistan
- Pakistan Military Academy
- Pakistan Air Force Academy
- Air University Pakistan
