= Command and Staff College Quetta =

Pakistan Army staff college in Quetta Cantonment, Balochistan

Coordinates: 30.2218°N 67.0600°E

Command and Staff College, Quetta
- کمانڈ و سٹاف کالج کوئٹہ د کمانډ اینډ سټاف کالج، کوټد کمانډ اینډ سټاف کالج، کوټه دانشکده فرماندهی و ستاد، کویته
- Emblem of Command and Staff College
- Former names: Staff College, Deolali (1905-07)
- Motto: Latin: Tam Marte Quam Minerva (1905-50); Persian: پیر شو بیاموز سعدی (Note: romanized: Pir Sho Biyamooz Saadi Urdu: سیکھتے ہوئے عمر رسیدہ ہو جاؤ، سعدی) (since 1950)
- Motto in English: By the pen as much as by the sword (1905-50); Grow old, learning Saadi (since 1950)
- Type: Staff college
- Established: 1905; 121 years ago
- Affiliations: Pakistan Armed Forces; National Defence University
- Commandant: Maj-Gen. Naseem Anwer
- Faculty: 55 approx.
- Administrative staff: 25 approx.
- Students: 400
- Location: Quetta, Balochistan, Pakistan
- Colours: Grey and Maroon
- Website: cscquetta.gov.pk

The Command and Staff College, Quetta (Note: Urdu: کمانڈ اینڈ سٹاف کالج کوئٹہ) is a staff college of the Pakistan Armed Forces located in Quetta, Balochistan.

== History ==
Established in 1905 as Staff College, Deolali, it was later shifted to its present location in 1907 and has been an alma mater of a number of renowned soldiers.

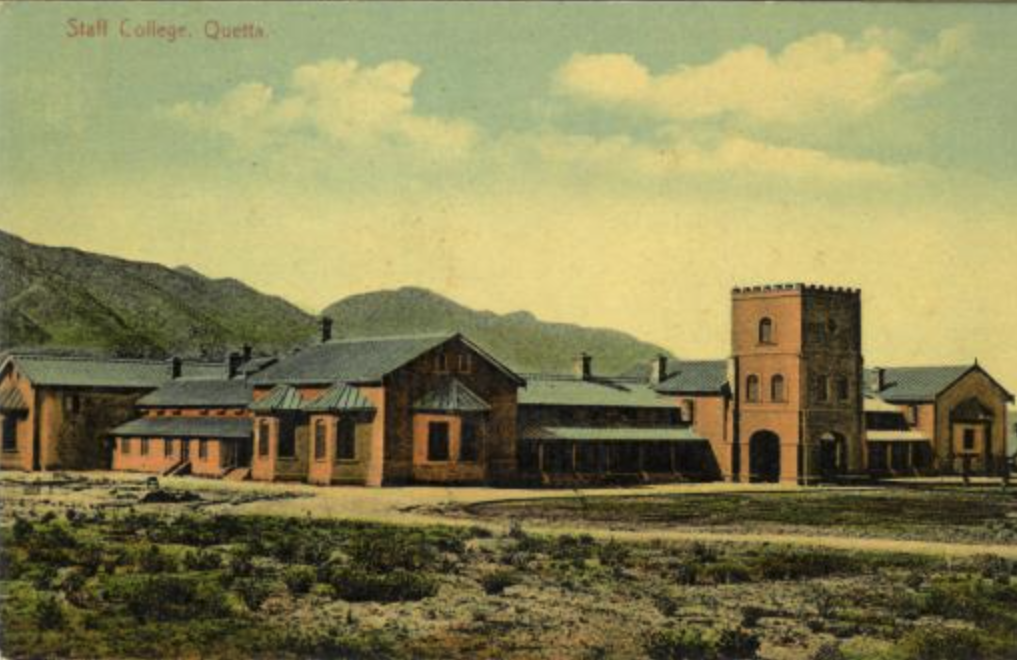
A postcard from the Command and Staff College produced between 1910 and 1930. Note the tower on the far right of the image.

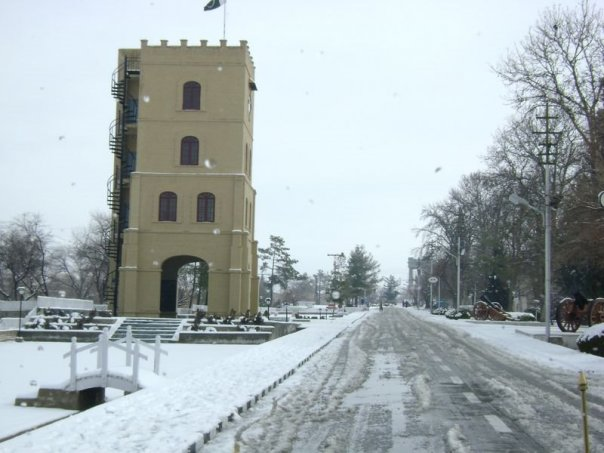
The only structure left standing from the original college grounds is the Staff College monument. Compared with its original construction above, it has had an additional storey added onto it since its original construction. This is due to reconstruction after an earthquake damaged most of the facility in 1935.

The need for a staff college arose when British Indian Army officers were required to undertake lengthy travel to Great Britain to pursue graduate studies at the Staff College, Camberley. However, the increasing number of enrollments made it difficult for the college to accommodate all applicants. During the reorganisation of the British Indian Army, Field Marshal Lord Kitchener, then Commander-in-Chief, India, emphasized this issue and proposed establishing a similar staff college in India, which facilitated the creation of additional staff appointments.

Lord Kitchener successfully submitted a proposal to set-up the college with a curriculum similar to that of the Staff College in Camberley. Initially, the India Command and Staff College was based in the "Musketeer School" in Deolali, a small hill station in Bombay Presidency, which is now Maharashtra, in 1905.

The British Army in India moved the Staff College to Quetta, Baluchistan when the new campus buildings, academic centers, and dormitories were erected and built in 1907. It was officially opened on 1 June of that year by Major General Horace Smith-Dorrien.

Following the outbreak of World War I, the college closed on 15 September 1915. The accommodation was transformed into a Cadet College to train young men for commission into the British and Indian armies. In 1919, the college started functioning again.

After the Partition of British India in August 1947, the British Army staff who did not want to stay in Pakistan moved to Wellington Cantonment in India to form the Defence Services Staff College for the newly formed Indian Army.

== Location ==
Command and Staff College is located in Quetta Cantonment in Balochistan and it is staff college is situated at the entrance to the Urak Valley. To the north, south-east and south-west stand the Takatu, Murdarghar, and Chiltan mountain ranges, rising to heights of 930–1,020 metres (3,050–3,350 ft). Lower than the Murdarghar and closer to the Command and Staff College, is the mountain known as the "Sleeping Beauty", which takes its name from its uncanny resemblance to a lady in repose. She is at her best when the first winter snow throws her in sharp contrast against the skyline.

== Motto and emblem ==
Until 1950, the college used the Latin motto "Tam Marte Quam Minerva" - loosely, "By the pen as much as by the sword". The old emblem included an owl, commonly known as a symbol of learning and wisdom, perched on crossed swords, in several variants.

In 1979, the owl was replaced by an epithet more appropriate for an Islamic country, Iqra, over the swords. Iqra literally means "Read!", and is a reference to the 96th surah of the Qur'an.

A scroll runs through the swords on which are inscribed the Persian words Pir Sho Biyamooz – Saadi. Its literal translation is "Grow old learning – Saadi," who was a famous Persian poet. When paraphrased, it means, "Go on learning and acquiring knowledge until you are old."

== Organisation ==
The college is headed by a commandant who is a major general, and is organised into two wings, namely, the Headquarters Wing and the Instructional Wing. The Instructional Wing, headed by a Chief Instructor (a Brigadier), is the mainstay of the college. The Senior Instructor Training (a Colonel) is responsible for curricular management and programming of all related activities, he is assisted General Staff Officer Grade 2, training 1. The faculty of research and doctrinal studies, commonly known as FORADS, is headed by a director of the rank of Colonel or Brigadier with four research sections and one IT and media wing, each being managed by a Directing Staff / Colonel member.

The Instructional Wing has four instructional divisions, each under a Senior Instructor of the rank of Colonel. The Headquarters Wing provides administrative support to the Instructional Wing.

It is a seat of learning for warfare and allied staff aspects with a student body of approximately 400 officers, which include nearly 30 officers from over 23 allied nations. The Allied Officers form an important segment of the college community. There are about 52 members on the faculty at any one time making an instructor to student ratio of about 1:8, which is amongst the highest in the world.

== Objectives ==
At the end of the year, the graduate should:

- Possess an insight into the employment of forces in tactical operations under the battlefield environment.
- Be able to handle operational and administrative staff functions and prepare his outfit to perform its peace and wartime roles.
- Be able to discern the place of tactical plans within the ambit of operational strategy and joint services warfare.
- Be able to apply leadership and management skills within the socio-religious setting.
- Be able to research issues of professional import.
- Be able to comprehend international and regional political order.
- Develop the skill to identify the central issue of military problems, and present options for their resolution.

== Academic and selection criteria ==
The Command and Staff College is a post-graduate military staff college where predominantly army officers are given admission. However, the admission to the Command and Staff College is not restricted but the admissions have been allowed and given to the navy and air force officers. Interagency federal officials concerned with national security issues are also given admission to the Command and Staff College.

The Pakistani military officers who attend the course must meet the following requirements:

- Rank/Service: at least at OF-4 rank with 8–12 years service.
- Courses: required Bachelor of Arts/Science degree and respective service mid-career courses and leadership promotion examinations.
- Selection Criteria: based on merit list of a competitive examination, service record and professional standing.
- Civilians: preferably Bachelor of Arts/Science to qualify for the award of Master of Science degree in Art and Science of Warfare from the National Defence University, Islamabad.

== Notable people ==
=== Alumni ===
- Archibald Wavell, 1st Earl Wavell
- Bernard Law Montgomery, 1st Viscount Montgomery of Alamein
- William Slim, 1st Viscount Slim
- Sir Claude Auchinleck
- Ayub Khan
- Sam Manekshaw
- K.M. Cariappa
- Thomas Blamey
- Musa Khan,
- Yahya Khan,
- Gul Hassan Khan,
- Tikka Khan,
- Rahimuddin Khan,
- Zia-ul-Haq,
- Mirza Aslam Beg,
- Asif Nawaz,
- Abdul Waheed Kakar,
- Jehangir Karamat,
- Pervez Musharraf,
- Ashfaq Parvez Kayani,
- Raheel Sharif,
- Qamar Javed Bajwa,
- Asim Munir
- General M. A. G. Osmani, Supreme Commander of Bangladesh Forces during the Bangladesh Liberation War
- Ziaur Rahman, 6th President of Bangladesh and 2nd Chief of Army Staff of Bangladesh.
- Major General Raza Muhammad
- Brigadier Daniel Austin
- General Tan Sri Mohammad Ghazali Che Mat, Chief of Malaysian Armed Forces from 1985 to 1987

=== Instructors ===
- General Joyanto Nath Chaudhuri Chief of Army Staff of the Indian Army from 1962 to 1966 and the Military Governor of Hyderabad State from 1948 to 1949.
- Lt Gen Agha Ibrahim Akram
- Field Marshal Bernard Montgomery.
- Qamar Javed Bajwa
- Lt.Gen Ali Kuli Khan Khattak

== Publication ==
The Citadel is a publication of the Command and Staff College, Quetta. It provides a forum for the expression of thoughts on doctrinal and conceptual issues and other matters of professional import, or those related to national security and interest. It was instituted in 1984, as an exclusively professional magazine, on the directions of General Muhammad Zia-ul-Haq, then President of Pakistan and Chief of the Army Staff. The name denotes both the territorial and ideological moorings. Prior to this, articles of such nature were published (regularly since 1947) in the college year-book, known at various times as Owl Pie (1921), The Owl (1922–78) and The Review (1979–83).

== Clubs ==
Associated clubs include:

Shikar (Shooting) Club - There is good shooting club within motoring distance of the college. Shikar trips are occasionally organized by the club.

Saddle Club - The college has 30 ponies for officers interested in riding. Membership of the club is also open to ladies and children above eight years of age. Interested officers are expected to bring their own riding kit. Traditionally, the club is extensively patronized by the allied officers community.

Polo - Polo is played with enthusiasm, even if sometimes without matching skills, and the season extends from April to November.

Al-Nisa Club - The college traditionally runs a very active ladies club which is known for its colourful and interesting activities. Meetings are normally held once a fortnight.

Allied Officers Cell - This cell functions under the Senior Instructor Training and deals with all matters related to guidance and welfare of Allied Officers. A member of the faculty and a Pakistani student officer is assigned to each Allied Officer to make his stay pleasant and comfortable.

== Campus ==
=== Libraries ===
The Command and Staff College has a Main and a Fiction Library. The Fiction Library has a good selection of weekly and monthly magazines in addition to books that offer a variety of light readings. The Main Library houses books, mainly professional in nature. A large number of international newspapers and magazines on professional and general subjects are also available in the Main Library.

=== Museum ===
The college has a small museum, which was inaugurated on 16 May 1979. This Museum houses various items of interest and historical value pertaining to the college.

=== Officers Mess ===
The Officers Mess is lodged in a building with an interior decor in traditional style. Most of the formal functions are held in the Mess. The Mess premises are also used for hosting private parties in accordance with the Mess Instructions. A snack bar, next to the Mess, functions in the evening. It was reconstructed in 1939.

=== Children's Schooling ===
The college runs an English-medium secondary School and College, the Iqra Army Public School and College, for the benefit of children of the student officers and the faculty.

=== Barki Park ===
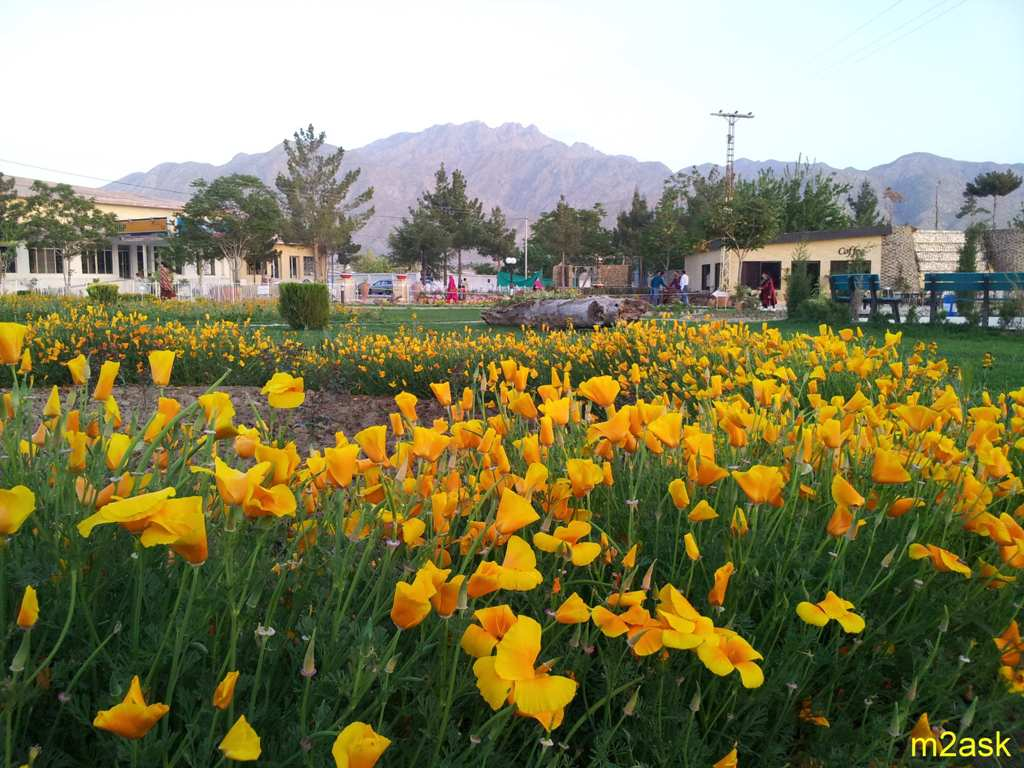
Barki Park

A number of outdoor facilities are provided inside the college campus and in the foothills of the mountains. Barki Park not only provides entertainment for children but also a soothing relief for the students and their families, especially with traditional live Rabab music every weekend. The entertainment facilities include a pizza and coffee shop, skating arena, zip line, rock climbing arena, lush green lawns with water oscillators, various shades of all weather roses and a lot more. Uplifting of the park, Project Green, was outsourced to Mr. Saadat Nabi Sherwani and Co. Project Green has been completed with a lot of Horticultural innovations by the designer.

== List of Commandants ==
| Name | tenure |
|---|---|
| Brigadier-general A. W. L. Bayly | Apr 1905 – Mar 1906 |
| Brig-gen Thompson Capper | Mar 1906 – Jan 1911 |
| Brig Gen Walter Braithwaite | Jan 1911 – Aug 1914 |
Closed during First World War
| Maj Gen Sir L. R. Vaughan | Jun 1919 – Jan 1923 |
| Maj Gen Sir Gerald Farrell Boyd | Jan 1923 – Jan 1927 |
| Maj Gen C. A. C. Goodwin | Jan 1927 – Dec 1927 |
| Maj Gen Edward Thomas Humphreys | Jan 1928 – Aug 1931 |
| Maj Gen Roger Cochrane Wilson | Sep 1931 – Oct 1934 |
| Maj Gen Guy Charles Williams | Oct 1934 - Apr 1937 |
| Maj Gen Brodie Haig | Apr 1937 - Mar 1940 |
| Brig Philip Christison | Mar 1940- Feb 1941 |
| Brig C. A. Osborne | Feb 1941 - Apr 1942 |
| Brig Geoffrey Charles Evans | Apr 1942 - Aug 1943 |
| Brig Brian Chappel | Aug 1943 - Jun 1944 |
| Brig H. V. Collingridge | Jun 1944 - Mar 1945 |
| Maj Gen S. F. Irwin | Mar 1945 - Mar 1947 |
| Maj Gen Henry Lowrie Davies | Apr 1947 - Aug 1947 |
Partition of India (August 1947)
| Maj Gen S. F. Irwin | Aug 1947 - Feb 1948 |
| Maj Gen I. C. A. Lauder | Feb 1948 - Mar 1952 |
| Maj Gen A. Tilly | Apr 1952 - Aug 1954 |
| Maj Gen M. A. Latif Khan | Aug 1954 - Jul 1957 |
| Maj Gen Mian Ghulam Jilani | Jul 1957 - Dec 1958 |
| Maj Gen S. A. A. Bilgrami | Dec 1958 - Dec 1962 |
| Maj Gen Sahabzada Yaqub Khan | Jan 1963 - Sep 1965 |
Indo-Pakistani war of 1965
| Maj Gen Akhtar Hussain Malik | May 1966 - Jun 1967 |
| Maj Gen Abrar Hussain | Aug 1967 - Mar 1968 |
| Maj Gen Muhammad Shariff | May 1968 - Jan 1970 |
| Maj Gen Azmat Bakhsh Awan | Feb 1970 - Feb 1972 |
| Maj Gen Riaz Azim | Feb 1972 - Dec 1974 |
| Maj Gen S. Wajahat Hussain | Jan 1975 - Jul 1977 |
| Maj Gen Muhammad Iqbal | Jul 1977 - Sep 1979 |
| Maj Gen Ahmed Shamim Khan | Sep 1979 - Aug 1982 |
| Maj Gen Muhammad Safdar | Aug 1982 - Sep 1985 |
| Maj Gen Rahim Dil Bhatti | Sep 1985 - May 1988 |
| Maj Gen Amin Khan Berki | May 1988 - May 1990 |
| Lt Gen Tanveer Naqvi | Jun 1990 - Dec 1991 |
| Maj Gen Ali Kuli Khan Khattak | Feb 1992 - Jun 1993 |
| Maj Gen Saeed uz Zafar | Jul 1993 - Dec 1995 |
| Maj Gen Syed Mohammad Amjad | Dec 1995 - Dec 1998 |
| Maj Gen Javaid Afzal Khan | Dec 1998 - Nov 1999 |
| Maj Gen/Lt Gen Tariq Waseem Ghazi | Feb 2000 - May 2001 |
| Maj Gen Malik Arif Hayat | May 2001 - May 2002 |
| Maj Gen Mohsin Kamal | May 2002 - April 2005 |
| Maj Gen Ahmad Shuja Pasha | Apr 2005 - Apr 2006 |
| Maj Gen/Lt Gen Khalid Nawaz Khan | May 2006 - May 2010 |
| Maj Gen/Lt Gen Khalid Rabbani | May 2010 - Nov 2011 |
| Maj Gen Sohail Ahmad Khan | Nov 2011 - Jan 2014 |
| Maj Gen Shahid Baig Mirza | Jan 2014 - May 2015 |
| Maj Gen/Lt Gen Aamir Abbasi | May 2015 - Dec 2017 |
| Maj Gen Sarfraz Ali | Jan 2018 - Oct 2018 |
| Maj Gen / Lt Gen Nadeem Anjum | Nov 2018 - Dec 2020 |
| Maj Gen Amer Ahsan Nawaz | Dec 2020 - Sep 2023 |
| Maj Gen Naseem Anwer | Sep 2023 - Incumbent |

== See also ==
- PAF Air War College
- Pakistan Naval War College

== Bibliography ==
- The Staff College, Quetta. The First Fifty Years of The Staff College Quetta, 1906–1955. (Quetta: The Staff College, 1962). 80 pages.
