= BBIN =

Subregional initiative in South Asia

Bangladesh, Bhutan, India, Nepal
- Member states shaded dark green.

Formalized
  - SAGQ: 14 May 1997

Area
  - Total: 3,621,298 km^{2} (1,398,191 sq mi)

Population
  - 2014 estimate: 1,465,236,000
- GDP (PPP): 2017 estimate
  - Total: $10.646 trillion

The Bangladesh, Bhutan, India, Nepal (BBIN) Initiative is a subregional architecture of countries in Eastern South Asia, a subregion of South Asia. It meets through official representation of member states to formulate, implement, and review quadrilateral agreements across areas such as water resources management, connectivity of power, transport, and infrastructure.

== Background ==
=== South Asian Growth Quadrangle ===
In light of economic interdependence demonstrated by "growth triangles" across Asia and hitherto unheeded concerns of eastern subcontinent nations, its Council of Ministers in May 1996 approved a subregional body of Nepal, Bhutan, northeast India, and Bangladesh as the South Asian Growth Quadrangle (SAGQ). A Malé summit one year later agreed to co-ordinate efforts catered "to the special individual needs of three or more member states," and formalised procedures focused on the subcontinent's northeast to develop intra-regional trade and investment, tourism, communication, and energy resources. Particular areas of collaboration were targeted to channel growth and complementarity.

As the mechanism operated through specific projects, constituent members endeavoured to integrate without requiring alteration in broader policy or methods of governance. It sought to impel the subregion's latent socio economic potential, harnessing disparate stages of development to augment each other. Borders of member states rest within 50 kilometres of Siliguri; ergo, contiguous norms, tradition, and lifestyle amongst inhabitants underscore the importance of an integrated market. Considerable emphasis was placed upon power trading between naturally abundant and energy-scarce localities to address the impact of shortages on industrial production, reverse consequently depressed rates of growth, reduce transmission and distribution losses through interconnected grids, and provide needed revenue for upstream nations with adverse balance of payments. However, the benefits of such trade remain untapped in the absence of a concerted strategy to remove barriers.

Over years its objectives expanded to incorporate land and port connectivity. Procurement of funds for this purpose was discussed at ADB headquarters, Manila, where formulation of the South Asia Subregional Economic Cooperation (SASEC) Program under the auspices of ADB concluded in March 2001. The formation worked toward economic synergy through arterial channels of trade and cross border initiatives. For instance, to link West Bengal and remote northeastern states through Bangladesh by rail, highway, and maritime corridors, alongside north–south transport routes that span Nepal, Bhutan, and Indian hill states to northern Bay of Bengal ports. These grids would then bridge extraneous regions throughout member states and beyond eastwards. With the accession of Maldives and Sri Lanka to SASEC in March 2014, notions of quadripartite integration appeared subsumed or rendered dormant.

Informal discussions led to renewed consensus on subregional ties outside bilateral agreements, owing partly to the continued failure of extant systems. A November 2014 Kathmandu summit saw endorsement of an accord on land transport by regional states, apart from one country's reservations causing it to fall through. The subsequent Summit Declaration reiterated subregional steps as contributory to wider connectedness. A framework for co-operation was subsequently drawn, with the first quaternary Joint Working Group (JWG) meeting in January 2015.

== Framework and implications ==
Through regular JWG sessions, representatives explore avenues of co-operation, exchange experiences and best practices, review data sharing arrangements for disaster forecasts and mitigation, besides strengthening transit facilitation measures such as shared border stations on key routes and harmonised customs procedures. The priority of "connectivity" further embodies seamless electrical grids, shared access to road, rail, air, and port infrastructure, and ease of travel. To such ends, a subregional Motor Vehicle Agreement that garnered assent in Thimphu would allow buses and later private vehicles with BBIN permits to travel unobstructed by border hindrances. Although manifestly of economic intent, the diplomatic weight accorded to this structure as opposed to alternatives in a region considered least integrated, was seen to connote purpose beyond interwoven commerce.

== Member states ==
Country	Population (2021)	GDP (PPP) (bn)	GDP per Capita (PPP)	GDP Growth Rate	Foreign Exchange Reserves (bn)	Literacy Rate (Given age & above) (15+)	Primary School Enrollment	Secondary School Enrollment	Life Expectancy (years)
Bangladesh	169,356,251	$1856	$5,453	8.2% (2019)	$37.10	93.3%	92%	73.91%	72.3
Bhutan	777,486	$6.3	$8,158	6.4%	$1.24	87.3%	91%	78%	71.5
India	1,407,563,842	$9,596.6	$7,266	7.6%	$537.55	91.7%	94%	69%	69.4
Nepal	30,034,989	$70.7	$2,488	5.5%	$11.65	84.8%	98%	67%	68

Data sourced from the International Monetary Fund, current as of April 2015, and is given in US dollars.

== Meetings of Joint Working Groups ==
Date	Host	Representation
18–19 April 2013	Dhaka, Bangladesh	Ambassador, Ministry Directors
30–31 January 2015	Delhi, India	Joint Secretaries
19–20 January 2016	Dhaka, Bangladesh	Foreign Affairs Joint Secretaries

== Motor Vehicle Agreement ==
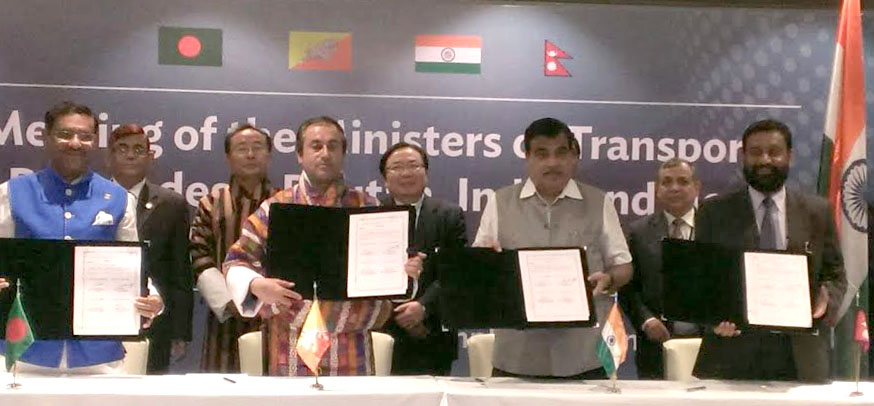
From left to right: The Minister of Road Transport and Bridges, Bangladesh, Obaidul Quader, with the Minister of Information and Communications, Bhutan, Mr. Lyonpo D.N. Dhungyel, the Minister for Road Transport & Highways and Shipping, India, Nitin Gadkari and the Minister of Physical Infrastructure and Transport, Nepal, Mr. Bimalendra Nidhi on the occasion of signing of the Motor Vehicles Agreement for the Regulation of Passenger, Personal and Cargo Vehicular Traffic between Bangladesh, Bhutan, India and Nepal, in Thimphu, Bhutan on 15 June 2015.

India proposed a SAARC Motor Vehicle Agreement during the 18th SAARC summit in Kathmandu in November 2014. Due to objections from Pakistan, an agreement could not be reached. India instead pursued a similar motor vehicle agreement with the BBIN. The BBIN Motor Vehicles Agreement (MVA) was signed on 15 June 2015 at the BBIN transport ministers meeting in Thimpu, Bhutan. The agreement will permit the member states to ply their vehicles in each other's territory for transportation of cargo and passengers, including third country transport and personal vehicles. Each vehicle would require an electronic permit to enter another country's territory, and border security arrangements between nations' borders will also remain. Cargo vehicles will be able to enter any of the four nations without the need for trans-shipment of goods from one country's truck to another's at the border. Under the system, cargo vehicles are tracked electronically, and permits are issued online and sent electronically to all land ports. Vehicles are fitted with an electronic seal that alerts regulators every time the container door is opened.

DHL Global Forwarding was appointed by the Indian government to carry out a pilot run under the agreement. The first cargo truck to take advantage of the motor vehicle agreement was flagged off from Kolkata on 1 November 2015. The truck travelled 640 km to reach Agartala via Dhaka. Prior to the signing of the BBIN Motor Vehicle Agreement, the truck would have had to travel 1550 km through Indian territory to reach Agartala. Officials cited this as an example of the time and cost savings that the BBIN Motor Vehicle Agreement would bring. In August 2016, Bangladesh dispatched a truck carrying garments from Dhaka to New Delhi as part of a trial run of the agreement. The truck received an electronic permit to enter Indian territory through an online web-based system. Instead of having to undergo customs clearance and formalities as it would prior to the agreement, the truck was fitted with an electronic seal with a GPS tracking device. The truck was then inspected for customs clearance at New Delhi, rather than at the border.

The agreement will enter into force after it is ratified by all four member nations. The agreement has been ratified by Bangladesh, India, and Nepal. The lower house of the Bhutanese parliament approved the agreement in early 2016, but it was rejected by the upper house in November 2016. Bhutan has requested for a cap to be fixed on the number of vehicles entering its territory. In May 2017, media reports stated that the Bhutanese government had told the Indian government to proceed with the agreement without Bhutan, as the Bhutanese government was unable to ratify the agreement in the upper house due to objections from opposition parties. Opponents of the measure in Bhutan claimed that the agreement would increase vehicular traffic from the other nations, which would affect Bhutanese truckers and also cause environmental damage. An existing bilateral agreement between Bhutan and India already permits seamless vehicle movement between the two countries. Therefore, Bhutan's decision to not ratify the BBIN MVA would only affect its trade with Nepal and Bangladesh. The Bhutanese government requested the other BBIN members to proceed with the agreement and also clarified that it would attempt to ratify the MVA after the country held general elections in 2018. Due to strained relations between Bhutan and Nepal, the Tshering Tobgay-led government feared that permitting Nepalese trucks to enter Bhutan would upset the electorate. India described Bhutan's decision as a "setback" and not a "rejection" of the agreement, stating that it was natural that all members could not proceed at the same pace and that India would continue its engagement with Bhutan on the issue.

In December 2018, Bhutanese Foreign Minister Tandi Dorji stated that the new government would reconsider the motor vehicle agreement, noting that Bhutanese trucks were facing difficulties entering Bangladesh while trucks from India and Nepal were afforded easy access. At the second Foreign Office Consultations (FOC) between Bangladesh and Bhutan in Dhaka in March 2019, Bangladeshi Foreign Secretary M. Shahidul Haque stressed the importance of Bhutan ratifying the agreement, calling it "crucial" for the future development of the region.

== Recent developments ==
In 2016, India approved $1.08 billion for the construction and upgrading of 558 kilometres (347 mi) of roads that join Bangladesh, Bhutan, and Nepal. The project will receive 50% funding from the Asian Development Bank. The project is scheduled to be completed by 2018. It is estimated that this project will increase the regional trade by 60% while that with the rest of the world by 30%.

== Reactions ==
C. Raja Mohan, Director, Institute of South Asian Studies, National University of Singapore, receives the idea of BBIN positively; while he agrees that the initiative didn't make enough progress, he still wants India and Bangladesh "to take a fresh look at the forum and find ways to widen the scope and pace of BBIN activity. Meanwhile, there is growing interest in Bhutan and Nepal for economic integration with Bangladesh." Sanjeev Ahluwalia, an advisor at Observer Research Foundation, writes that BBIN, as a sub-region within BIMSTEC, should forge "an interparliamentary group to enlarge cooperation say in cross border energy trade, digital security, space applications and green technology." That said," Myanmar and Thailand could join as observers to internalise the lessons learnt in AIPA." Pradumna B. Rana, a visiting associate professor at Nanyang Technological University, finds BBIN economic cooperation gaining "considerable traction". "With BBIN," Rana writes, "India's Northeast region is emerging as the bridgehead between South and Southeast Asia."

== See also ==
- ASEAN
- BIMSTEC
- India's International connectivity projects
- Foreign relations of Bangladesh
- Foreign relations of Bhutan
- Foreign relations of India
- Foreign relations of Nepal
