= 2016 Uri attack =

Attack on Indian troops by insurgents in Jammu and Kashmir

- Part of Insurgency in Jammu and Kashmir
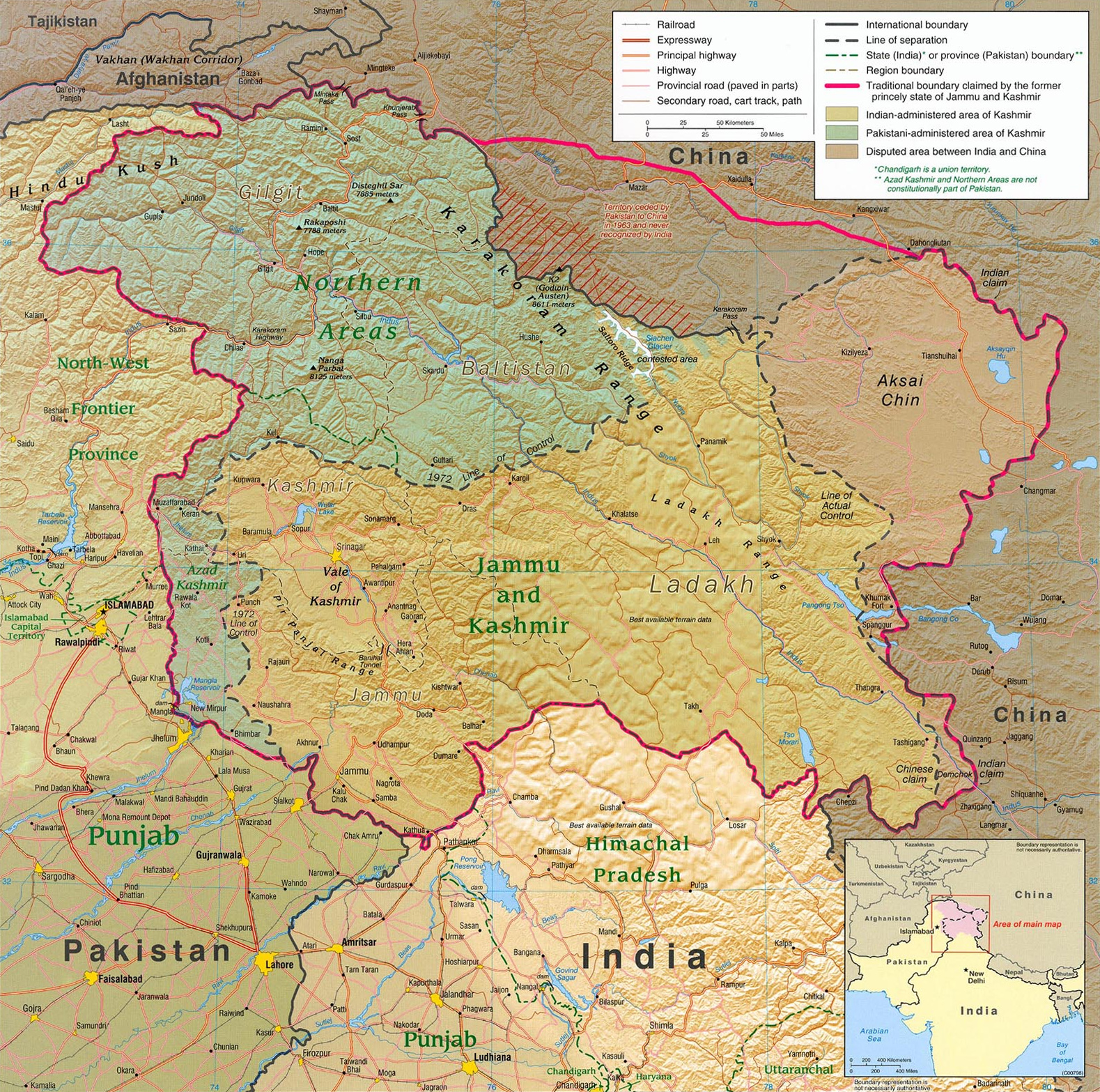
Date	18 September 2016; 10 years ago
Location	Uri, Jammu and Kashmir

Belligerents
Insurgents	India

Units involved
Jaish-e-Muhammad	Indian Army Indian Army 4 Para (special forces)

Casualties and losses
4 killed	19 killed, 19-30 injured

The 2016 Uri attack was carried out on 18 September 2016 by four terrorists from Jaish-e-Mohammed against an Indian Army brigade headquarters near the town of Uri in the Indian Jammu and Kashmir. 19 Indian soldiers were killed in the attack, and 19–30 others were injured. It was reported by the BBC as having been "the deadliest attack on Indian Forces in Kashmir in two decades".

Jaish-e-Mohammed, a Pakistan-based jihadist organization (designated as a terrorist organization by the India, Australia, the US, and UK among others, and proscribed by Pakistan in 2002), was involved in the planning and execution of the attack. At the time it was carried out, the Kashmir Valley was experiencing high levels of violent unrest.

== Background ==
The 2016 Uri attack, which resulted in the deaths of 19 Indian soldiers, was swiftly attributed by India to militant groups allegedly operating from Pakistan, leading to significant diplomatic fallout and military escalation.

Additionally, since 2015, insurgents had increasingly taken to high-profile fidayeen attacks (suicide attacks) against the Indian security forces: in July 2015, three insurgents attacked a bus and police station in Gurdaspur, and earlier in 2016, 4–6 terrorists attacked the Pathankot Air Force Station. Indian authorities had blamed Jaish-e-Mohammad for the latter attack.

Also, since 8 July 2016, the Indian-administered Jammu and Kashmir region had been undergoing continuous unrest following the killing of Burhan Wani, local militant of the Hizb-ul-Mujahideen. The killing sparked violent protests against the Indian government in the valley, leading to the protests being described as the "largest anti-India protests" against Indian rule in recent years.

== Attack ==
At around 5:30 a.m. on 18 September, four insurgents attacked an Indian Army brigade headquarters in Uri, near the Line of Control in a pre-dawn ambush. They were said to have lobbed 17 grenades in three minutes. As a rear administrative base camp with tents caught fire, 17 army personnel were killed during the attack. An additional 19–30 soldiers were reported to have been injured. A gun battle ensued lasting six hours, during which all the four individuals were killed. Combing operations continued to flush out additional militants thought to be alive.

Most of the Indian soldiers had suffered casualties and subsequently those who died were from the 10th battalion, Dogra Regiment (10 Dogra) and 6th battalion, Bihar Regiment (6 Bihar). One of the injured soldiers succumbed to his injuries on 19 September at RR Hospital in Delhi Cantonment, New Delhi, followed by another soldier on 24 September, bringing the death toll to 19.

The casualties were primarily believed to have occurred as a result of non-fire retardant transition tents. This was the time of a troops shift, whereby troops from 6 Bihar were replacing troops from 10 Dogra. The incoming troops were housed in tents, which are normally avoided in sensitive areas around the LoC like Uri. The insurgents snuck into the camp breaching heavy security and seemed to know exactly where to strike. Seven of the personnel killed were support staff, including cooks and barbers.

== Aftermath ==
On 19 September, Home Minister Rajnath Singh, Defence Minister Manohar Parrikar, Chief of the Army Staff Dalbir Singh, National Security Advisor Ajit Doval and other officials of the Home and Defence ministries met to review the security situation in Kashmir, particularly in areas along the Line of Control. The National Investigation Agency filed a first information report regarding the attack and took over the investigation from Jammu and Kashmir Police on 20 September.

Pakistan International Airlines cancelled flights to some parts of Kashmir on 21 September in the aftermath of the attack. Security around the army installation in Uri was intensified following the attack, while soldiers on both the Indian and Pakistani side of Line of Control were placed on high alert.

=== Postponement of SAARC summit ===
In the wake of the attack, India cancelled its participation in the 19th SAARC summit to be held in November in Islamabad, Pakistan. The Ministry of External Affairs issued a statement, saying, "India has conveyed to current SAARC Chair Nepal that increasing cross-border terrorist attacks in the region and growing interference in the internal affairs of Member States by one country have created an environment that is not conducive to the successful holding of the 19th SAARC Summit in Islamabad in November 2016." "In the prevailing circumstances, the Government of India is unable to participate in the proposed Summit in Islamabad", the statement said.

Regarding India's withdrawal from the scheduled SAARC summit in Islamabad, Pakistan's Foreign Office termed the withdrawal "unfortunate", and posted a rejoinder stating: "As for the excuse used by India, the world knows that it is India that has been perpetrating and financing terrorism in Pakistan." The statement included a reference to Indian national Kulbhushan Jadhav, detained by Pakistan for espionage, and accused India of violating international laws by interfering inside Pakistan.

Later, Afghanistan, Bangladesh and Bhutan also withdrew from the summit. On 30 September 2016, Pakistan stated that the summit scheduled for 9 and 10 November in Islamabad would be held on alternative dates.

=== Indian retaliation ===
On 28 September, ten days after the attack, the Indian Army conducted retaliatory surgical strikes on alleged launch-pads used by militants in Pakistan Administered Kashmir. Indian Director General of Military Operations (DGMO) Lt Gen Ranbir Singh said that it had made a preemptive strike against "terrorist teams" who were preparing to "carry out infiltration and conduct terrorist strikes inside Jammu and Kashmir and in various metros in other states". The Economist while citing Indian reports, reported that Indian commandos crossed the Line of Control and struck at the safe houses, allegedly killing approximately 150 Kashmiri militants.

=== Bilateral boycott ===
Following the uproar after the Uri attack, Indian Motion Picture Producers Association (IMPPA) decided to ban all Pakistani actors, actresses and technicians working in India until the situation returns to normal. Bollywood artists were divided towards the ban with some justifying it while some questioning its benefits. Indian TV entertainment channel Zindagi announced discontinuation of airing Pakistani TV shows on the channel. The Pakistani government responded in October with a blanket ban on all Indian television and radio programming in Pakistan.

The Board of Control for Cricket in India (BCCI), the national governing body for cricket in India, ruled out the possibility of reviving bilateral cricket ties with Pakistan in the near future. BCCI also asked the International Cricket Council (ICC) to not group Indian and Pakistan cricket teams together in international tournaments, keeping in mind border tensions between the two countries. Badminton Association of India, the governing body for badminton in India, decided to boycott the Pakistan International Series scheduled to be held in Islamabad in October, as an act of "solidarity" with the government's diplomatic offensive against Pakistan.

== Investigation ==
An initial investigation into the attack indicated that there were several procedural lapses at the camp. According to the standard security procedures, any tall grass and bushes around vital security installations should be trimmed. However, this procedure was not followed by the Uri camp which might have allowed insurgents to sneak into the camp undetected using the tall grass and bushes around the perimeter. In addition, the probe also indicated that two manned guard posts failed to detect the intrusion because the coordination between them might have been poor. It also indicated that the terrorists had infiltrated the Indian territory through Haji Pir Pass on the intervening night of 16–17 September and stayed in Sukhdar village which is located at a vantage point that allows an unhindered view of the layout of the camp as well as movement of the personnel in it.

=== Perpetrators ===
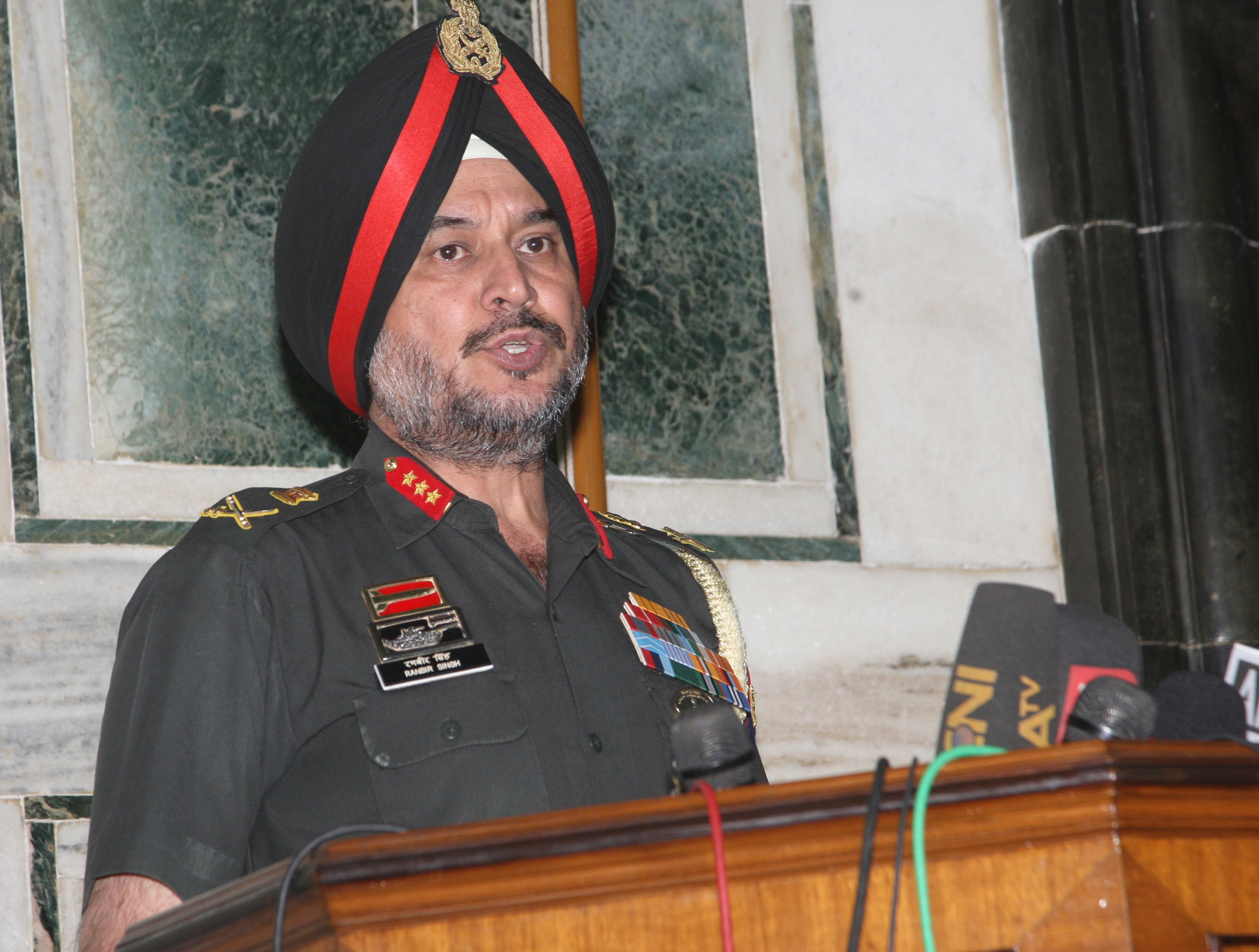
The Director General Military Operations (DGMO) Lt. Gen. Ranbir Singh briefing the media on the terrorist attack at Army Camp, in Uri, a day after the attacks, on September 19, 2016.

The Director General of military operations, Lieutenant-General Ranbir Singh, said that there was evidence that the individuals involved in the attack belonged to Jaish-e-Mohammad. He established a hotline contact with his Pakistani counterpart and conveyed India's serious concern on the issue. Singh also stated that the militants used incendiary ammunition to set fire to the tents.

The Indian Ministry of External Affairs said:

In the recent incidents, we have recovered a number of items that include GPS from the bodies of terrorists with coordinates that indicate the point and time of infiltration across the LoC and the subsequent route to the terror attack site; grenades with Pakistani markings; communication matrix sheets; communication equipment; and other stores made in Pakistan, including food, medicines and clothes.

Whilst, on 29 September, National Investigation Agency officials said:

Until now, little hard evidence has emerged to link the perpetrators of the terror attack in Uri to specific jihadist groups in Pakistan.

Former Pakistani General Pervez Musharraf said the weapons that India reported as used by militants, and reported to have Pakistani markings, could be procured anywhere in the world, not just in Pakistan. Musharraf further said since many American weapons had inadvertently fallen into the hands of the Taliban, it is possible for Pakistani weapons to have been acquired by the perpetrators without Pakistani involvement.

On 25 September, the Indian Army announced that two Pakistani nationals (Note: The two individuals were identified as Ahasan Kursheed of Khaliana Kalan and Faisal Hussain Awan of Potha Jahangir.) from Pakistan administered Kashmir were arrested by the Border Security Force in the Uri sector. They were said to have been recruited by Jaish-e-Muhammad two years ago for the purpose of acting as guides to infiltrating groups in the Uri sector. These guides themselves did not have a role in the Uri attack. They were being questioned for gathering intelligence about infiltration attempts. Pakistan denied these allegations. On 26 February 2017, India's National Investigative Agency (NIA) decided to file a closure report after failing to find any evidence against the two men whom they accused of facilitating the Uri army base attack.

On 25 October 2016, the Indian media reported that street "posters" in Gujranwala, Pakistan, attributed to Lashkar-e-Taiba (LeT) claimed responsibility for the Uri attack. The posters claimed that one of LeT's fighters Mohammad Anas, code-named Abu Saraqa, died in the Uri attack, and there would be a funeral prayer followed by a speech by the LeT chief Hafiz Saeed on 25 October. The poster also claimed death of 17 Indian soldiers in Uri attack. After the images of the poster circulated on the Internet, the organisation claimed that it was a hoax. Abbas Nasir, the former editor of Dawn, confirmed the report about the posters on Twitter but stated that the funeral prayers have been postponed.

== Reactions ==
=== India ===
Prime Minister Narendra Modi and members of his cabinet condemned the attack. Minister of Defence Manohar Parrikar and Indian Army chief General Dalbir Singh visited Kashmir soon after the attack to assess the ongoing military operations and review the security situation in the region. Parrikar instructed the army to take firm action against those responsible for the attack and also stated that the deaths of the soldiers "will not go in vain." Home Minister Rajnath Singh accused Pakistan of what he called its "continued and direct support to terrorism and terrorist groups," calling Pakistan a "terrorist state" that should be "isolated." Minister of State for Defence Subhash Bhamre stated that the "entire nation was traumatised" over the death of the soldiers and was "united in this hour of grief." He also stated that the Prime Minister, Home Minister and Defence Minister had come to a conclusion that some sort of a "response" needs to be given to Pakistan.

Minister of State for External Affairs Sushma Swaraj and former Army chief Vijay Kumar Singh stated that India will give a "befitting reply" to the attack. He called upon the Indian Armed Forces to scale up their security and described a cold and calculated response as the need of the hour. He also called for an investigation into the shortcomings which led to the attack while stating that the Army should decide its response "coolly" with proper planning. Many Indian politicians and public figures have condemned the attack. Former Indian diplomats and foreign policy experts have said that India had been driven to the wall and that a measured and effective response was needed. The opposition Indian National Congress has said that there was no more scope for constructive dialogue with Pakistan.

Later on the same day, India called upon the United Nations Human Rights Council to urge Pakistan to put an end to cross-border infiltration and dismantle the non-state militant infrastructure since the likes of Hafeez Saeed (the chief of Lashkar-e-Taiba) and Syed Salahuddin (the chief of Hizbul Mujahideen) can hold huge rallies in Pakistan's main cities. It suggested that active support for such groups has become the "new normal" in Pakistan. It claimed that "zero tolerance" to non-state militancy was an international obligation. The Indian government summoned the Pakistani envoy and handed him a dossier that alleged Pakistani involvement as well as a warning that Pakistan needs to rein in militants they say operate from Pakistan.

On 24 September, Prime Minister Modi formally responded to the attack during a BJP rally in Kozhikode, Kerala; in his address, he charged Pakistan with responsibility for the attack, saying that India would "never forget" Uri and would "leave no stone unturned to isolate Pakistan in the world." He called upon the citizens of both India and Pakistan to fight against poverty. "I want to say that India is ready for a war... India is ready for a war on poverty. Let both countries fight to see who would eradicate poverty first... I want to tell the youth of Pakistan, let's have a war on ending unemployment... I want to call out to the children in Pakistan, let's declare war on illiteracy. Let's see who wins."

In further responding to the attack, on 26 September, the Indian government stated it would exercise its rights under the 1960 Indus Waters Treaty to the full and would expand its utilisation of its rivers flowing through Jammu and Kashmir. Talks under the aegis of the Permanent Indus Commission, to which any disputes may be submitted, would cease "until terror comes to an end." The body had most recently met in July 2016. The government subsequently stated it would review Pakistan's most-favoured-nation (MFN) trade status, which India had granted in 1996.

=== Pakistan ===
Pakistan's Foreign Ministry rejected India's allegations of involvement in the attack. The ministry asserted that India had a "tendency" of accusing Pakistan for incidents inside its territory, adding that "in the past many Indians were involved in the terrorist acts for which India had blamed Pakistan." The ministry deemed Indian statements as "vitriolic." During a press conference in London, Pakistani Prime Minister Nawaz Sharif linked the incident to the recent unrest and human rights issues in Kashmir. Interior Minister Nisar Ali Khan said there were several contradictions within Indian media reports over the evidence, and claimed India was imposing censorship when their "lies were exposed." Defence Minister Khawaja Muhammad Asif termed the attack an "inside job", saying that no proof was provided substantiating India's allegations, and said India was not serious about solving the Kashmir dispute. Pakistan's envoy in New Delhi, Abdul Basit, told India's Foreign Secretary S. Jaishankar that India sought to divert world attention from state atrocities in Kashmir by blaming the attack on Pakistan. Basit also added that if India was serious about the investigations, it should not avoid allowing independent investigators to probe it.

In the hours following the attack, Pakistan's military established a hotline with the Indian military. The Pakistani military rejected Indian accusations, saying that infiltration was not possible across the heavily guarded LOC. Pakistan's Director General of Military Operations also asked the Indian military to provide actionable intelligence.

Pakistan's Chief of Army Staff Raheel Sharif claimed that India was propagating a "hostile narrative" in response the attack and also stated that the Pakistani armed forces were "prepared to respond to the entire spectrum of direct and indirect threat."

In response to India's suspension of cooperation over the Indus Waters Treaty, Sartaj Aziz said India could not revoke the treaty unilaterally as per the IWT's provisions and international laws, and said such a move would be taken as an act of "war and hostilities." Aziz said Pakistan would approach the United Nations Security Council in that event.

== International Reactions ==
Countries

- Islamic Republic of Afghanistan – Afghan Ambassador to India Shaida Mohammad Abdali condemned the attack. Pledging his nation's support to Prime Minister Narendra Modi's call for a strong and firm action against the perpetrators, Ambassador Abdali said: "We fully support PM Modi's call for strong and firm action against those who terrorise people, and those who use terrorism as an instrument of foreign policy; seeing this for many years. Whoever uses terrorism shouldn't only be isolated but also held accountable."
- Armenia – Armenia condemned the attack and expressed condolences to "families of killed and friendly people of India".
- Bahrain – Bahrain's Ministry of Foreign Affairs affirmed the nation's "full support to the friendly Republic of India in their actions to counter terrorism" and called for "concerted efforts to eliminate it (terrorism) and cut off its funding."
- Bangladesh –Bangladesh High Commissioner to India Syed Muazzem Ali condemned the attack. Bangladesh – MOFA has not yet released a press release. The country has also withdrawn from the 19th SAARC summit scheduled to be held in Islamabad, Pakistan.
- Bhutan – The Foreign Ministry issued a statement that read: "Bhutan strongly condemns terrorism in all its forms and stands with India in the fight against terrorism. Such heinous acts of terrorism calls for the need to step up international cooperation to combat the scourge of terrorism that poses a severe threat to the peace and stability of all countries."
- Canada – Acting High Commissioner Jess Dutton issued a statement condemning the attack and extending Canada's condolences to the victims and their families. "We are appalled by these attacks and stand with the Government of India in the fight against terrorism."
- China – The Foreign Ministry issued a statement condemning the attack and expressed sympathy towards the families of the slain soldiers as well as the injured soldiers. It also expressed concerns about rising tensions in the Kashmir region and called upon India and Pakistan to hold dialogue and consultations in order to solve their differences and counter-terrorism operations.
- France – The Ministry of Foreign Affairs and International Development issued a statement condemning the attack and calling for a peaceful settlement to disputes in Kashmir. "France condemns in the firmest terms the terrible terrorist attack committed on 18 September against an Indian Army camp in the Kashmir region. It expresses its condolences to the families of the 17 Indian soldiers killed in this attack. France stands beside India in the struggle against terrorism. It calls on each state to effectively fight against terrorist groups operating on its territory or from its territory against other countries. France reaffirms its commitment for a peaceful and structured settlement of differences in the region of Kashmir." France also called for "decisive actions" against anti-India terrorist organisations, including Lashkar-e-Taiba, Jaish-e-Mohammed and Hizbul Mujahideen.
- Germany – Minister of Foreign Affairs Frank-Walter Steinmeier condemned the attack and said, "our thoughts are with the families of the murdered soldiers and with the many people who have been injured, some seriously." He added, "Germany stands resolutely at India's side in the fight against terrorism. At the Indo-German counterterrorism consultations, which will take place in a few days' time, we will further discuss the threats to our two countries' societies.".
- Italy – Minister of Foreign Affairs Paolo Gentiloni condemned the attack "in Jammu and Kashmir." He offered "deepest condolences to the families of the victims and to the Indian authorities," also affirming "Italy's solidarity with India in a common fight against terrorism to promote peace and security in the world."
- Japan – The Ministry of Foreign Affairs issued a statement which read: "The Government of Japan strongly condemns the terrorist attack on the Indian Base in Uri, Jammu and Kashmir, and extends its sincere condolences to those who lost their lives and their bereaved families, and expresses its heartfelt sympathy to those who were injured."
- Maldives – Maldives condemned the attack, saying that it has "always condemned international terrorism, especially those originating from outside, defeating and eliminating which requires international collaboration and cooperation in good faith."
- Mauritius – Mauritius condemned the attack and said that it "stands in solidarity with the Government of India and with all those committed to the fight against terrorism."
- Mongolia – Mongolia expressed its deep regret in regards to the attack and said that the "terrorist attack must not be a disruption of efforts for strengthening the regional stability and mutual understanding in the region."
- Nepal – In a message to his Indian counterpart, Prime Minister Prachanda said he was of the firm belief that the perpetrators behind this heinous act will be brought to justice at the earliest. He reiterated the Nepali government's position of unequivocally condemning non-state militancy in all its forms and manifestations and said that such acts must be firmly and resolutely dealt with. Prachanda also extended his heartfelt condolences and sympathies to the bereaved families.
- Qatar – Qatar condemned the attack, stressing its "condemnation of such criminal acts which aim to undermine security and stability."
- Russia – The Russian Foreign Ministry issued a statement condemning the attacks, and also offered condolences to the families of victims. The Ministry also expressed concern about the terrorist attacks near the Line of Control stating, "We are also concerned about the fact that, according to New Delhi, the army base near Uri was attacked from Pakistani territory." The ministry added, "We believe that this criminal act will be investigated properly, and that its organisers and perpetrators will be held accountable. We confirm our continued support for the Indian government's counterterrorism efforts." On 19 September, Indian media claimed that Russia was cancelling a joint military exercise with Pakistan that had been scheduled to begin on 24 September. However, Russian forces arrived in Pakistan on 23 September and commenced the exercises as scheduled.
- Saudi Arabia – Saudi Arabia expressed its "strong condemnation and denunciation of the terrorist attack that targeted an Indian military base in the Uri area of north Kashmir, killing and wounding dozens."
- Singapore – Prime Minister Lee Hsien Loong condemned the attack during an official visit to India on 4 October. "Singapore condemns terrorism in all forms and we express condolences to the victims of the terror attack in Uri."
- Sri Lanka – President Maithripala Sirisena called PM Modi to condemn the attack and offered condolences to the families of the victims. The Foreign Ministry issued a statement that read the attack and reaffirmed the "urgent need for sustained" regional and global cooperation to eliminate terrorism. "In the hour of grief, the Government of Sri Lanka offers its condolences to the families of the victims of the attack." On 30 September, Sri Lanka postponed its participation for the SAARC summit, saying the prevailing environment in the region was not conducive.
- South Korea – South Korea extended its "deepest condolences and sympathy to the innocent victims of the terrorist attack and their bereaved families," adding that terrorism is an unjustifiable crime against humanity.
- Turkey – Ministry of Foreign Affairs issued a statement expressing sorrow over the "heinous attack," extending its condolences "to the families of soldiers who lost their lives" and wishing those injured a speedy recovery. The ministry said it was "deeply concerned about the increasing tension and casualties occurring recently in Jammu and Kashmir," and expressed hope that problems would be "settled through dialogue and within the framework of the relevant UN resolutions."
- UAE – The Ministry of Foreign Affairs and International Cooperation issued a statement "renewing the nation's firm stand against terrorism in all its forms and manifestations, its solidarity with the Republic of India and its support to all actions it may take to confront and eradicate terrorism". It further offered deepest condolences and sympathy to the families of the victims, as well as the government and people of India, and wished a speedy recovery to those who had been injured.
- United Kingdom – Foreign Secretary Boris Johnson condemned the attack. "The UK strongly condemns this morning's terrorist attack in Indian-administered Kashmir. I offer my deepest condolences to the victims and their families and friends. The UK condemns all forms of terrorism, and stands shoulder to shoulder with India in the fight against terrorism, and in bringing the perpetrators to justice."
- United States – State Department spokesperson John Kirby said: "The United States strongly condemns the terrorist attack on an Indian army base in Kashmir during the early morning of September 18. We extend our condolences to the victims and their families. The United States is committed to our strong partnership with the Indian government to combat terrorism."

The Chairman of the US House Subcommittee on Terrorism, Congressman Ted Poe from Texas, along with Dana Rohrabacher from California, introduced a bill in the House of Representatives calling for a declaration of Pakistan as a "state sponsor of terrorism." The bill HR6069 requires the president to issue a report within 90 days detailing Pakistan's role in supporting international terrorism followed by discussion from the US Secretary of State. Ted Poe said in a statement that Pakistan was not only an untrustworthy ally but it has also aided and abetted the enemies of the United States. He called the Uri attack the "latest consequence of Pakistan's longstanding irresponsible policy of supporting and providing operational space for 'jihadi' terrorist groups".
Venezuela – Venezuelan President Nicolás Maduro expressed solidarity with the people of India and stated: "We are committed along with our brotherly people of the world to get into the depth of this problem that has generated proliferation of terrorist movements, which doesn't respect life and the need for coexistence of people."

Organizations

- United Nations – On 19 September, Ban Ki-moon, the spokesperson of the Secretary-General of the United Nations, issued a statement which condemned the attack and expressed his deepest sympathy and condolences to the families of the soldiers who lost their lives and to the government of India. He also wished a speedy recovery to those who were injured during the attack and hoped that the perpetrators of the army base will be identified and brought to justice.
- European Union – An EU spokesperson issued a statement calling for solidarity against non-state militancy and expressing condolences to the families of the victims of the attack. "Yesterday's terrorist attack against the Uri Indian military camp demonstrates once again that terrorism has no boundaries, and that it is a global threat. As far as the European Union is concerned, we are committed to working with our partners and the international community at large to combat terrorism in all its forms. Our first thoughts and condolences go to the victims of this attack and to their families. We wish a quick recovery to those who were injured."

== Media ==
The Deutsche Welle noted that Kashmir was already in international headlines at the time of the Uri attack due to the anti-India protests. It further noted that immediately after the attack, mainstream media in India and Pakistan engaged in "angry" rhetoric towards each other. A video of Indian soldiers chanting "Pakistan, hear this loud and clear: If ... war breaks out you will be obliterated" went viral. The Diplomat noted that many Indian media had openly called for a war on Pakistan.

India Today suggested that the fallout from the Uri attack would hurt Pakistani artists in India. Maharashtra Navnirman Sena gave all Pakistani artists in India 48 hours to leave the country and warned that they would be "hunted down". Subhash Chandra also said Pakistani artists should leave. Zee TV considered terminating Pakistani shows. The Indian Motion Picture Producers Association (IMPPA) decided to ban all Pakistani actors, actresses and technicians in India till the situation returned to normal. However Bollywood artists were divided towards the ban with some justifying it while some questioning its benefits.

On 18 September, the Times of India revealed that the army personnel recovered a map from the attackers which had markings in the Pashtun language and indicated a detailed plan of action. Four AK-47 rifles and four under barrel grenade launchers along with ammunition were also recovered. According to the Indian Army, some of the items had Pakistani markings. This was denied by the National Investigation Agency.

The Diplomat noted that the timing of the attack coincided with the Pakistani Prime Minister Nawaz Sharif's visit to New York to address the United Nations General Assembly the following week. The Diplomat, in another article, said that the attack was "designed" to increase public pressure against the Modi government's engagement with Pakistan. It also reported that there was specific intelligence input from the Intelligence Bureau two days earlier that an attack was being planned against army formations close to the LOC. The intelligence agency had said that three fidayeen squads were launched from Pakistan-administered Kashmir. One of them attacked Uri, another went to Poonch where it was engaged by the security forces, and the third is believed to be targeting Srinagar highway. The India Today Television mentioned that, according to unnamed intelligence sources, Pakistan was plotting a "spectacular event" ahead of Nawaz Sharif's speech to the UN General Assembly.

== See also ==
- 2016 Indian Line of Control strike (Indian retaliation to this attack)
- India-Pakistan Relations
- List of terrorist incidents in India
- Uri: The Surgical Strike
- Avrodh: The Siege Within
