= Saleem Asmi =

Pakistani journalist (1934–2020)

- Born: Syed Fazle Saleem Asmi; 29 November 1934; Jhansi, United Provinces, British India
- Died: 30 October 2020 (aged 85); Karachi, Sindh, Pakistan
- Education: University of Karachi
- Occupations: Journalist, editor
- Employers: The Times of Karachi; Civil & Military Gazette; Pakistan Times; The Muslim; Khaleej Times; Dawn
- Known for: Editor of Dawn (2000–2003); President of Karachi Press Club

Syed Fazle Saleem Asmi (29 November 1934 – 30 October 2020), commonly known as Saleem Asmi, was a Pakistani journalist and editor. The seventh editor of Dawn, he held the position from March 2000 until his retirement in January 2003. Asmi also served as news editor of the Dubai-based daily Khaleej Times during the mid-1980s and was elected president of the Karachi Press Club.

== Early life and education ==
Asmi was born on 29 November 1934 in Jhansi, in the United Provinces of British India. He spent his formative years in Delhi. Following the Partition of 1947, his family migrated to Pakistan, settling first in Hyderabad, where he completed his school education, before moving to Karachi.

Asmi studied at the University of Karachi, from which he received a Master of Arts in English literature in 1955. During his college and university years he was active in left-leaning student politics, first within the Democratic Students Federation (DSF) and subsequently within the National Students Federation (NSF).

== Career ==
=== Early journalism ===
Asmi began his journalistic career as a trainee sub-editor at The Times of Karachi, joining the paper as an internee in 1956. During the early 1960s he worked in Lahore with the Civil & Military Gazette and subsequently joined the Pakistan Times, where he eventually served as city editor. He briefly left journalism for a position in public relations at Pakistan International Airlines before returning to the Pakistan Times at its Rawalpindi office.

=== Imprisonment under Zia-ul-Haq ===
Following the 1977 military coup led by Muhammad Zia-ul-Haq, Asmi was dismissed from the Pakistan Times and was among the journalists arrested in connection with protests against press restrictions imposed by the military government. He was sentenced by a Lahore military court and served a prison term at Multan Central Jail alongside fellow journalists, including Nasir Malik, during the strike organised by the Pakistan Federal Union of Journalists (PFUJ) in protest at censorship measures and newspaper closures.

After his release, Asmi was associated with the launch of the English-language daily The Muslim in Islamabad in 1978, and is credited with designing the paper's initial layout.

=== Khaleej Times ===
In the mid-1980s Asmi moved to Dubai to become news editor of the English-language daily Khaleej Times, a position he held for several years.

=== Dawn ===
In 1988, Asmi returned to Pakistan and joined Dawn as city editor, and was subsequently appointed news editor of the paper. He was responsible for launching Dawn's Islamabad edition.

In March 2000, Asmi was appointed the seventh editor of Dawn, succeeding Ahmad Ali Khan, who retired after more than a quarter-century in the post; he was the first editor of the paper to have risen through its news desk. During his editorship, the paper added three colour magazines: covering science, the visual arts (The Gallery) and book reviews (Books and Authors), and separated its city pages from the main edition into distinct sections.

In November 2001, during Asmi's editorship, Dawn published an interview with Osama bin Laden conducted by the journalist Hamid Mir. The interview had been declined by Mir's own newspaper and was brought to Dawn amid reported pressure on Mir from the government of Pervez Musharraf not to publish it.

Asmi retired from the editorship in January 2003.

== Human rights and public roles ==
Asmi was twice elected president of the Karachi Press Club, serving from 1991 to 1993.

He also served on the council of the Human Rights Commission of Pakistan (HRCP) and was elected vice-chairperson of the commission for the Sindh chapter, working in collaboration with the commission's then chair Dorab Patel and its secretary-general Asma Jahangir. On his appointment as editor of Dawn in 2000, he resigned from the HRCP vice-chairpersonship to avoid a conflict of interest.

== Personal life ==
Asmi married and had two sons and a daughter; all three resided abroad at the time of his death. A collector of modern Pakistani art, he assembled a body of work that included paintings by Bashir Mirza and Jamil Naqsh, a selection of which was later donated to Karachi's Mohatta Palace Museum and to other institutions.

A selection of Asmi's journalistic work, including interviews with figures such as Faiz Ahmad Faiz and Roshan Ara Begum, was compiled by his friend S. M. Shahid and published in 2012 under the title Saleem Asmi: Interviews, Articles, Reviews.

== Death ==
Asmi died in Karachi on the night of 30 October 2020, at the age of 85, after a long illness. He was survived by his wife, two sons and a daughter.
