= Azhar Abbas (journalist) =

Pakistani journalist

- اظہر عباس
- Born: Pakistan
- Occupation: Journalist
- Relatives: Zaffar Abbas (brother); Mazhar Abbas (brother); Athar Abbas (brother)
- Awards: Hilal-i-Imtiaz
- Website: www.geo.tv/writer/azhar-abbas

Azhar Abbas is a Pakistani journalist who is currently serving as the managing director of Geo News.

== Early life and education ==
Azhar Abbas was born to Mirza Abid Abbas, an educationist who was served as a secretary of the Hyderabad Board of Education. Abbas has four brothers, retired Major General Athar Abbas, Zaffar Abbas, Anwer Abbas, and Mazhar Abbas.

In 2008 Abbas's brother, Athar Abbas, became the Director General of the ISPR. He served until 2012 and was Pakistan's Ambassador to Ukraine from 2015 to 2018. His other brother Mazhar Abbas is the secretary general of the Pakistan Federal Union of Journalists, while another brother, Zaffar Abbas, is the editor of Dawn. He has another brother named Anwer Abbas.

== Career ==
He began his career in 1990 with an English-language daily newspaper as a reporter. He has also worked for Dawn News as the director of news and current affairs. He joined Bol News when the network was established but left after the Axact scandal. He is a strong supporter of the journalistic community in Pakistan and an advocate for their well-being.

== Awards and recognition ==
- Azhar Abbas (journalist) was awarded the Hilal-i-Imtiaz (Crescent of Excellence) in 2013 by the President of Pakistan.
