= Mazhar Abbas =

Pakistani journalist (born 1958)

- مظہر عباس
- Born: 6 July 1958 (age 68); Hyderabad, Sindh, Pakistan
- Education: Masters in Mass Communication, University of Karachi
- Occupation: Journalist
- Years active: 1987-present
- Employer: Geo News (2015-present)
- Notable work: Selector Se Selected Tak
- Spouse: Irum Mazhar (died 2020)
- Children: 2 daughters
- Relatives: Azhar Abbas (brother); Zaffar Abbas (brother); Athar Abbas (brother)
- Awards: International Press Freedom Award (2007) by the CPJ

Mazhar Abbas (Urdu: مظہر عباس; born 6 July 1958) is a Pakistani journalist currently working as a senior analyst for Geo News and a columnist for Daily Jang. Previously, he was the deputy director of ARY News, and the secretary general of the Pakistan Federal Union of Journalists. He is the brother of Zaffar Abbas, the editor of Dawn, and Azhar Abbas, the managing director of Geo News.

== Early life ==
Abbas studied journalism at the University of Karachi. He wants to give each citizen in Pakistan the right to speak on social and human rights issues, regardless of what the military and government are doing. Because of this, he has covered many controversial cases over the years.

In his early career in 2002, he covered the kidnapping and murder of Daniel Pearl, a Bureau Chief of The Wall Street Journal.

== Career ==
Abbas worked for Agence France-Presse as Bureau Chief in Karachi for six years.

Abbas is the deputy director of the ARY News Television network. Through this network, he focuses on providing commentary on the country's powerful and controversial military and government figures. He also provides financial support to journalists who are working in difficult conditions as they try to report on what is happening in dangerous areas.

Abbas was awarded the CPJ International Press Freedom Award in 2007.

He was awarded the Missouri Honour Medal for Distinguished Service in Journalism in 2009.

Abbas, who has worked as a journalist for nearly thirty years, has received threats as a result of his work. After protesting the closing of three independent TV channels for their reporting on demonstrations against President Musharraf, he was charged by police in early 2007. In May 2007, he and two other journalists found white envelopes containing bullets placed on their cars.

== Political views ==
As a member of the Karachi Press Club, whose members regularly perform demonstrations against the government in the name of human and civil rights, he ended up on a hit list of the Mohajir Rabita Council, an ethnic political group in Pakistan's southern province of Sindh, which was allied with former President Pervez Musharraf.

== Personal life and family ==
Abbas's father, an educationist, was Mirza Abid Abbas, the former secretary of the Hyderabad Board of Education; he died in 2002. Mazhar has four brothers, Maj. Gen. (R) Athar Abbas, Zaffar Abbas, Anwer Abbas, and Azhar Abbas.

In 2008, Abbas's brother, Athar Abbas, became the director general of the Inter-Services Public Relations. He served until 2012 and was Pakistan's Ambassador to Ukraine from 2015 to 2018. His other brother Azhar Abbas (journalist) was the managing director of Geo News (TV network), while another Zaffar Abbas is the editor of Dawn (newspaper).

Abbas has two daughters.
