= Ayub Khan: Pakistan's First Military Ruler =

1993 biography by Altaf Gauhar

- Author: Altaf Gauhar
- Language: English
- Subject: Ayub Khan; Politics of Pakistan
- Genre: Biography
- Publisher: Sang-e-Meel Publications
- Publication date: 1993
- Publication place: Pakistan
- Media type: Print
- Pages: 540
- ISBN: 969-35-0295-7
- OCLC: 30593261
- Dewey Decimal: 954.904/6/092
- LC Class: DS385.A9 G38 1993

Ayub Khan: Pakistan's First Military Ruler is a 1993 biography by Pakistani civil servant and journalist Altaf Gauhar about Ayub Khan. First published by Sang-e-Meel Publications in Lahore, the book was later reissued by Oxford University Press in 1996. Written by Ayub's former information secretary, it presents an insider account of Ayub's rule and his attempt to lead Pakistan toward modernization.

== Synopsis ==
The book covers Ayub Khan's political career and Pakistan's government during his period in power. It examines Ayub's authoritarian system of government and the much-publicized "Decade of Reforms", as well as the 1965 presidential election against Fatima Jinnah, the Tashkent Declaration, and the Agartala Conspiracy Case.

== Reception ==
In a review for Pakistan Horizon, Kamal Muhammad Habib said that although readers might disagree with Gauhar's point of view, he was a powerful writer, and the book "defies classification". In 2010, Dawn referred to the book as Gauhar's "magnum opus" in a retrospective survey of books on Ayub Khan. The book was also reviewed by Ian Talbot in The English Historical Review.
