= Athar Abbas =

Pakistani general and ambassador

Athar Abbas HI(M)
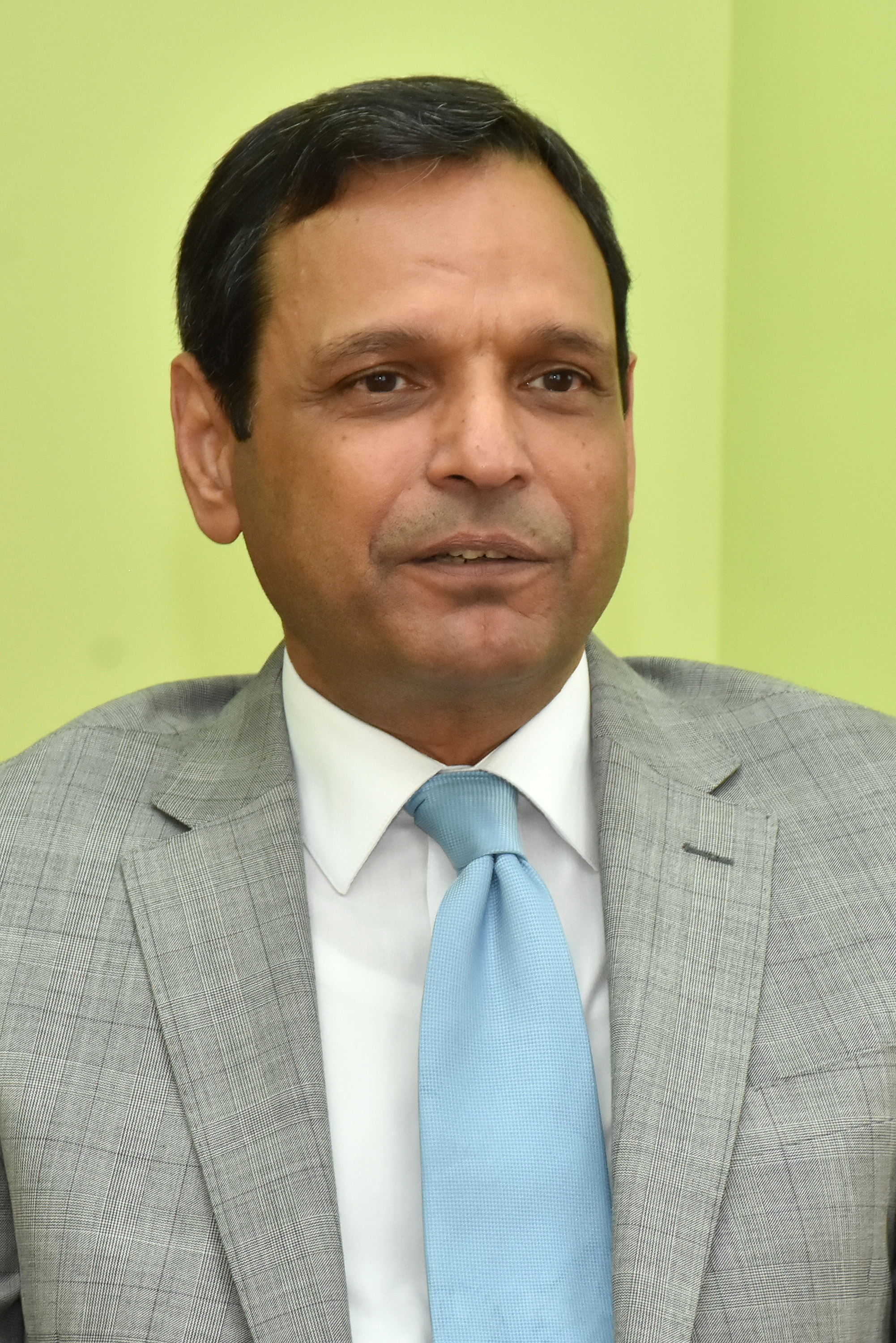
- Major General Athar Abbas

Ambassador of Pakistan to Ukraine
- In office 2015–2018

Director General of the Inter Services Public Relations
- In office 2008–2012
- Preceded by: Waheed Arshad
- Succeeded by: Asim Saleem Bajwa

Personal details
- Born: 23 June 1955 (age 71) Lahore
- Education: Asia Pacific Centre for Security Studies; National Defence University; Quaid-i-Azam University; Pakistan Military Academy
- Awards: Hilal-e-Imtiaz (Military)

Military service
- Allegiance: Pakistan
- Branch/service: Pakistan Army
- Years of service: 1976 – 2012
- Rank: Major General
- Unit: Army Armored Corps
- Commands: 6th Armoured Division, Kharian; DG Quartering and Lands; DG Inter-Services Public Relations
- Battles/wars: Kargil conflict; War in North-West Pakistan; Operation Sherdil; Operation Black Thunderstorm; Operation Rah e Raast; Khyber Pass offensive; Operation Rah-e-Nijat; Orakzai and Kurram offensive

Athar Abbas (born 23 June 1955) is a former Director General of the Inter-Services Public Relations (ISPR) and former Ambassador of Pakistan to Ukraine from 2015 to 2018. He retired from active military service after 35 years in June 2012.

== Military career ==
General Abbas was commissioned in October 1976 in the 54th PMA Long Course from the Pakistan Military Academy, Kakul into the Pakistan Armoured Corps. He has held various command, staff and instructional appointments that include command of an armoured regiment, armoured brigade and armoured division. He has been General Staff officer (Operations) in various armoured formations. He is a graduate of Command and Staff College, Quetta and Malaysian Armed Forces Staff College, Malaysia. After 35 years of active military service, Athar Abbas retired in June 2012.

== Education ==
He is a participant of the Executive Course at Asia Pacific Centre for Security Studies, Hawaii, US. He has attended Armed Forces War Course and National Defence Course at the National Defence University, Islamabad. He has been on the faculty of Command and Staff College, Quetta and National Defence College, Islamabad. He holds a master's degrees in War Studies as well as Strategic Studies from Quaid-i-Azam University, Islamabad. He was promoted to major general in June 2005 and had commanded an armoured division in Kharian from June 2005 to June 2007.

== Other office appointments ==
Before joining Inter Services Public Relations Directorate, General Abbas served as Director General Quartering and Lands in Quartermaster General's Branch, General Headquarters. After he was appointed as the DG ISPR, Major General Mohammad Farooq replaced him at his previous position.

== Family ==
Athar Abbas is married with three children, two daughters and a son.

He also has 4 brothers, 3 of them are journalists Azhar Abbas (journalist), Mazhar Abbas, and Zaffar Abbas. The other is Anwer Abbas.

== See also ==
- Pakistan Army
- Pakistani Armed Forces

Military offices
Preceded by Waheed Arshad	Director General of the ISPR; 2008 – 2012	Succeeded by Asim Saleem Bajwa
