= Ahmad Ali Khan (journalist) =

Pakistani journalist and newspaper editor (1924 - 2007)

Ahmad Ali khan
- Born: Ahmad Ali Khan; 1 July 1924; Bhopal State, United Provinces, British India
- Died: 13 March 2007 (aged 82); Karachi, Pakistan
- Citizenship: British Indian (1924–1947); Pakistani (1947 onwards)
- Education: Aligarh Muslim University
- Years active: 1946 - 2003
- Known for: Editor at Dawn (1962 - 2003)
- Spouse: Hajra Masroor
- Children: 2 daughters
- Awards: Hilal-i-Imtiaz (Crescent of Excellence) Award by the Government of Pakistan in 2009; Pride of Performance Award by the President of Pakistan in 1997

Ahmad Ali Khan (1924 – 13 March 2007) was a veteran Pakistani journalist who was the editor of the Dawn newspaper for 28 years.

His association with Dawn was for nearly 42 years as a journalist and later as an editor/chief editor for 28 years.

== Early life and career ==
Ahmad Ali Khan was born in 1924 in Bhopal State, United Provinces, British India. He completed his education at the Aligarh Muslim University. After the independence of Pakistan in 1947, he migrated to Karachi to continue serving his old employer in India, Dawn, where he worked as a journalist until May 1949. Then he decided to move to Lahore, Pakistan and started working for the Pakistan Times there. At that newspaper in Lahore, he benefited and gained useful experience by working with journalists like Faiz Ahmed Faiz, Mazhar Ali Khan and Mian Iftikharuddin.

During the 13 years he worked for this newspaper based in Lahore, he was once detained under Security Act as part of Pakistani government's crackdown on the leftists and people belonging to the Progressive Writers' Movement.

In 1962, Ahmad Ali Khan returned to Karachi to rejoin his old employer from 1946 to 1949, Dawn, where he started working as an assistant editor under the supervision of its veteran editor Altaf Husain. He later worked with Altaf Gauhar as well at the same newspaper. After the separation of East Pakistan as an independent nation of Bangladesh in 1971, there was a short supply of newsprint paper that reduced the size of Dawn to just eight pages. In addition, government's denial of advertisements to some newspapers including the Dawn to pressurize them to be in tune with the regime's policies.

He worked as an editor at Dawn from May 1973 to 2000, making him the newspaper's longest-serving editor.

He played a key role in improving its financial stability, independence and prestige. He introduced some technical changes such as its printing moving from the old-style hot metal and offset printing to full computerization. He first retired as the chief editor in 2000, and then returned in 2003 for a short period. After retirement, he started working on his autobiography in 2000 but was not in good health. He died in 2007 before he could finish it. Still he was able to finish its 7 chapters and the remaining two chapters were completed by his daughter Naveed Ahmad Tahir after his death. The book was finally published in 2015.

== Death and legacy ==
Ahmad Ali Khan died in Karachi on 13 March 2007 after a protracted illness at age 82. Among the survivors were his wife, a noted Pakistani writer Hajra Masroor and two daughters.

According to one of her long-time co-worker and a noted Pakistani columnist Zubeida Mustafa, "Khan was a man of principle and integrity... he was a good teacher and believed in values and ethics of journalism".

== Awards and recognition ==
- Hilal-i-Imtiaz (Crescent of Excellence) Award by the Government of Pakistan in 2009.
- Pride of Performance Award by the President of Pakistan in 1997.

== Bibliography ==
- In Search of Sense – My Years As A Journalist (with an introduction by I. A. Rehman, secretary-general of the Human Rights Commission of Pakistan), (published in 2015).
