= Asim Saleem Bajwa =

Pakistani general and government official

Lieutenant General Asim Saleem Bajwa HI(M) TBt
- عاصم سلیم باجوہ
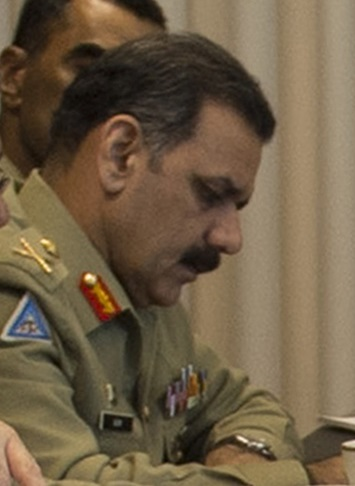
- Lieutenant General Asim in 2014

Chairman of the CPEC Authority
- In office November 2019 – 3 August 2021
- President: Arif Alvi
- Prime Minister: Imran Khan
- Succeeded by: Khalid Mansoor

Special Assistant to the Prime Minister on Information and Broadcasting
- In office 28 April 2020 – 12 October 2020
- President: Arif Alvi
- Prime Minister: Imran Khan
- Minister: Shibli Faraz
- Preceded by: Firdous Ashiq Awan (as Special Assistant)

Commander Southern Command & XII Corps
- In office September 2017 – September 2019

Inspector General Arms, GHQ
- In office December 2016 – September 2017

Director General of the ISPR
- In office June 2012 – December 2016
- Preceded by: Athar Abbas
- Succeeded by: Asif Ghafoor

Personal details
- Spouse: Farrukh Zeba
- Children: Muhammad Bajwa; Eusha Bajwa; Azib Bajwa; Asim Bajwa
- Education: Pakistan Military Academy
- Awards: Hilal-e-Imtiaz (Military); Tamgha-e-Basalat

Military service
- Allegiance: Pakistan
- Branch/service: Pakistan Army
- Years of service: 1984–2019
- Rank: Lieutenant General
- Unit: Punjab Regiment
- Battles/wars: War on terror; War in Afghanistan (2001-2021); Insurgency in Balochistan; War in North-West Pakistan; Operation Rah-e-Nijat; Operation Rah-e-Shahadat; Operation Brekhna; Operation Zarb-e-Azb; Operation Radd-ul-Fasaad; Durand line skirmishes; 2016–2018 India–Pakistan border skirmishes

Asim Saleem Bajwa HI(M) TBt (Urdu, Punjabi: عاصم سلیم باجوہ) is a retired Pakistani three-star general who served as the chairman of China-Pakistan Economic Corridor Authority from November 2019 to August 2021 and the special assistant to then Prime Minister Imran Khan on the Ministry of Information and Broadcasting from 28 April 2020 to 12 October 2020. On 11 December 2016, Bajwa was appointed as Inspector General Arms at GHQ, where he served until his appointment to the position of Commander Southern Command and XII Corps in September 2017. Previously, he also served as Director General of the ISPR from 2012 to 2016.

== Early life and education ==
Asim Saleem Bajwa was born into a middle-class Punjabi Jat family of the Bajwa clan in Sadiqabad, Punjab, Pakistan.

His father Muhammad Saleem Bajwa was a government employee and medical doctor who was assassinated while travelling to Karachi on train in 1976, and Asim has five brothers, himself being the third after Tanvir and Taloot, both doctors, and three sisters.

He was commissioned in the 34th Punjab Regiment in 1984 after being passed out from the Pakistan Military Academy in Kakul. He graduated from the Command and Staff College in Quetta, as well as the National Defence University in Islamabad, followed by the Staff College, Camberley. He holds a master's degrees in war studies from National Defence University, Islamabad and defence studies from King's College London.

== Military career ==
Bajwa held various command, staff, and instructional appointments. During his military career, he served on multiple instructional and command-level posts, such as leading an anti-tank battalion, the 111th Infantry Brigade and an infantry division in erstwhile Tribal Areas where he played a key role in stabilization efforts during various operations.

He was a brigade major of an infantry brigade and served as Chief of Staff of a strike corps.

He instructed courses at PMA Kakul and the Command and Staff College, Quetta. General Bajwa has served as the deputy military secretary to the President of Pakistan. He assisted General Pervez Musharraf in compiling his book In the Line of Fire.

In December 2010, he was promoted to the rank of Major General.

On 4 June 2012, Bajwa was appointed as the director general of the Inter-Services Public Relations. On 22 September 2015, he was promoted to the rank of lieutenant general.

In December 2016, Bajwa was appointed Inspector General Arms (IG Arms) at General Headquarters where he served until 28 September 2017. In September 2017, he was appointed Commander Southern Command of the Pakistan Army where he served until 2019. He was instrumental in numerous development initiatives in Balochistan.

He is the recipient of Hilal-i-Imtiaz (military) and Tamgha-e-Basalat.

== Post-retirement career ==
In November 2019, after his retirement from the army, Bajwa was appointed as the chairman of the newly created CPEC Authority. Establishment Division notified Bajwa as chairman of the China-Pakistan Economic Corridor Authority for a tenure of four years.

In April 2020, Bajwa was appointed as Special Advisor to the Prime Minister (SAPM) on Information and Broadcasting. Later in an interview on 3 September 2020, Bajwa announced his resignation from his post as Special Advisor to the PM for Information and Broadcasting. However, prime minister Imran Khan refused to accept his resignation. On 12 October 2020, his resignation as SAPM was finally accepted by the Prime Minister.

== Personal life ==
A member of the Bajwa clan, Asim Bajwa is married to Farrukh Zeba and has three children with her and four grand children. His hobbies include reading and playing golf.

His sons are Muhammad Bajwa, Eusha Bajwa, and Azib Bajwa. Asim Bajwa has mentioned in his response to FactFocus report alleging using public money for his own business interests that his sons are graduates of US business schools. His mother died on 31 December 2025.

== Controversies ==
=== Family business and conflict of interest ===
In 2020, writing for FactFocus, Pakistani journalist Ahmad Noorani said that Bajwa and his family have established what he calls a "business empire" worth tens of millions of dollars, with 99 companies in four countries under the name of Bajco Group, beginning in 2002, when Asim's younger brothers opened a Papa John's pizza restaurant when Asim became a lieutenant colonel in military dictator Pervez Musharraf's staff. Asim's sons also established new companies in the United States, independent of the Bajco Group, after Asim became the DG-ISPR. Noorani thus alleged that Asim and his family have extended their business ventures using public money.

Asim eventually denied what he calls "baseless allegations".

=== Political interference ===
During the All-Parties Conference held on 20 September 2020, the former prime minister of Pakistan Nawaz Sharif alleged that Asim Bajwa plotted to topple the Balochistan government while still in uniform and serving as Commander Southern Command. He was also responsible for introducing Balochistan Awami Party.

== Awards and decorations ==
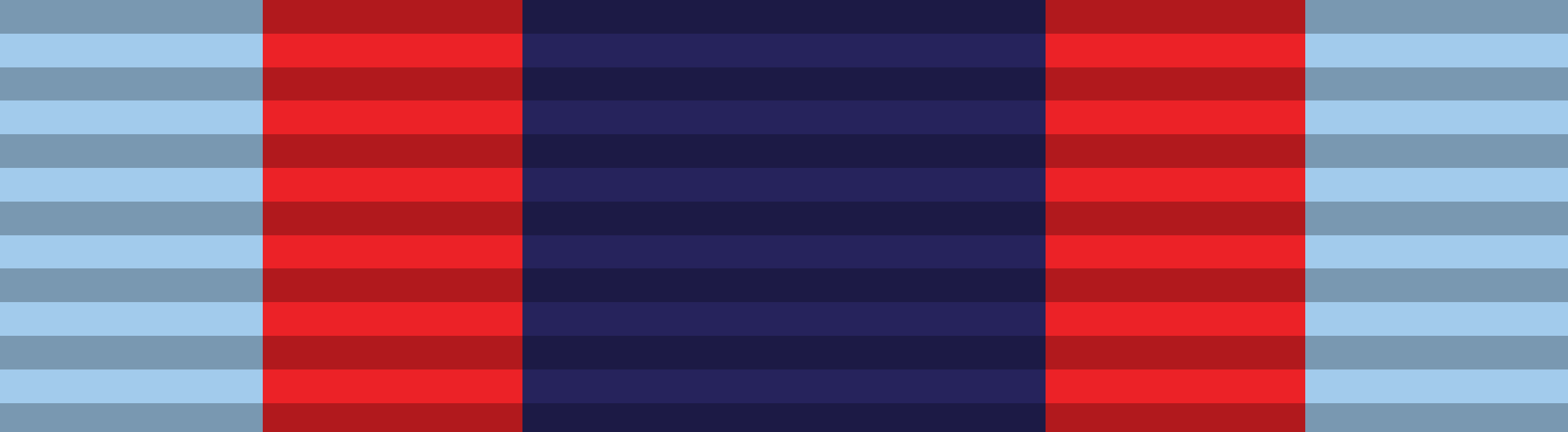

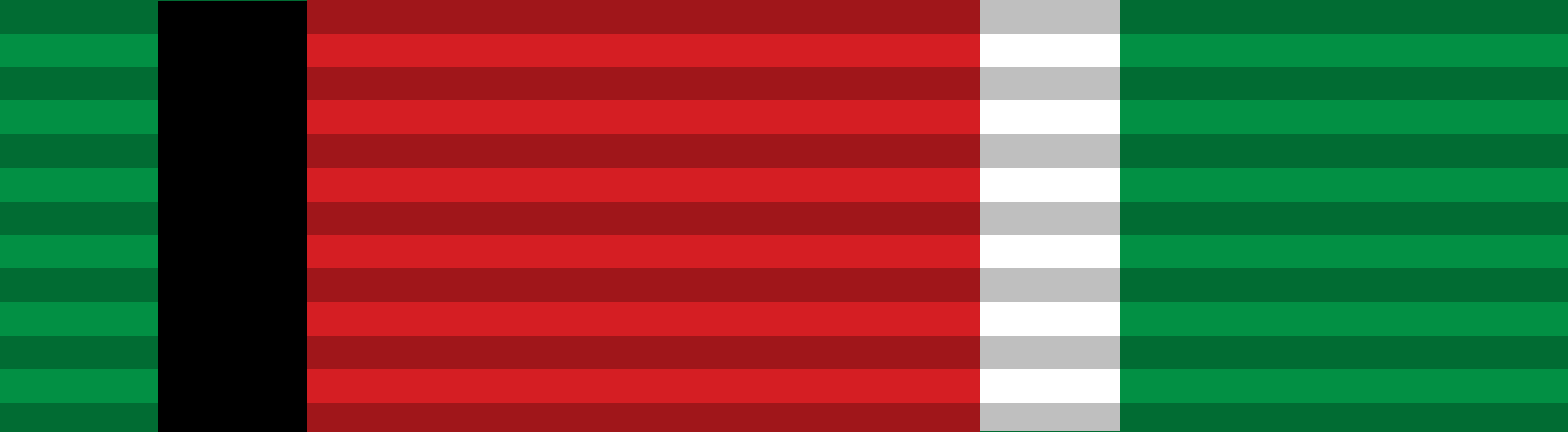

| Hilal-e-Imtiaz (Military) (Crescent of Excellence) | Tamgha-e-Basalat (Medal of Good Conduct) | | Tamgha-e-Diffa (General Service Medal) Siachen Glacier Clasp |
| Tamgha-e-Baqa (Nuclear Test Medal) 1998 | Tamgha-e-Istaqlal Pakistan (Escalation with India Medal) 2002 | Tamgha-e-Azm (Medal of Conviction) 2018 | 10 Years Service Medal |
| 20 Years Service Medal | 30 Years Service Medal | 35 Years Service Medal | Hijri Tamgha (Hijri Medal) 1979 |
| Jamhuriat Tamgha (Democracy Medal) 1988 | Qarardad-e-Pakistan Tamgha (Resolution Day Golden Jubilee Medal) 1990 | Tamgha-e-Salgirah Pakistan (Independence Day Golden Jubilee Medal) 1997 | Command and Staff College Quetta Instructor's Medal |

== See also ==
- Inter-Services Public Relations
- List of serving Generals of the Pakistan Army
- Criticism of the Pakistan Armed Forces

Military offices
| Preceded by Athar Abbas | Director General of the ISPR; 2012 -2016 | Succeeded by Asif Ghafoor |
