= Tahir Mirza =

Pakistani journalist and editor (1936–2007)

Tahir Mirza (Urdu: طاهر مرزا) (November 1936 – 29 May 2007) was a Pakistani journalist and former editor of Dawn, Pakistan's oldest and most widely circulated English-language newspaper. He became resident editor of this newspaper in Lahore in 1994 and worked as a correspondent in Washington, DC, before becoming editor of the newspaper in Karachi after the retirement of its noted editor Ahmed Ali Khan in 2003.

== Early life ==
Tahir Mirza was born in November 1936 in British India and graduated from the University of Lucknow, India.

== Career ==
Tahir Mirza started his career as a reporter with an English-language newspaper in Dhaka. He migrated to Lahore, Pakistan in the early 1960s and started working for the newspaper, Civil and Military Gazette there. He later went over to work for another newspaper of Lahore, Pakistan Times in 1963.

Later in his long career, he also worked for Khaleej Times of Dubai for some years. His career required that he travel to places like Lucknow, Karachi, Dhaka, Lahore, London, Dubai and Washington to serve as a journalist. He was widely considered to be a mild-mannered but firm professional.

During his service at the newspaper, Pakistan Times, Tahir Mirza participated in trade union activities. He was an active member of Pakistan Federal Union of Journalists (PFUJ) in Karachi during the period of General Ayub Khan's regime (1958 – 1966).

In 1975, Tahir Mirza helped another veteran journalist Mazhar Ali Khan launch a weekly magazine Viewpoint that represented the leftists' views in Pakistan. He also worked for Khaleej Times in Dubai for some years.

== Death and legacy ==
Tahir Mirza served as editor of Dawn newspaper from September 2003 to June 2006, when he resigned from this job due to failing health. He died on 29 May 2007 in Aga Khan Hospital, Karachi, of lung cancer.

During his long career as a journalist, he showed no regrets as having chosen journalism as his career even though it was not among the best paying jobs in Pakistan. He once told his journalist colleagues, "Given a chance, I will repeat it all over again".

Another famous quote by him is, "The only way to get respect is to show respect; and be always respected for your hard work. Once you do that there is no reason why anyone will not respect you".
