= 19th SAARC summit =

Former scheduled diplomatic conference

- Host country: Pakistan
- Date: November 15–19, 2016 (Note: Event cancelled)
- Cities: Islamabad
- Participants: N/A
- Follows: 18th SAARC summit
- Precedes: 20th SAARC summit
- Website: Saarc

The 19th SAARC summit was a scheduled diplomatic conference which was originally planned to be held in Islamabad, Pakistan, on 15–19 November 2016, but got cancelled after an attack on an Indian army camp in Kashmir. The summit was to be attended by the leaders of the eight SAARC member states and representatives of observers and guest states.

Following the rising diplomatic tensions after the 2016 Uri attack, India announced its boycott of the summit, alleging Pakistan's involvement in the attack. Later, Bangladesh, Afghanistan, and Bhutan also pulled out of the summit. culminating in an indefinite postponement of the summit.

== Background ==
Following the 2016 Uri terror attack, India cancelled its participation in the 19th SAARC summit, alleging Pakistan's involvement in the terror attack.

== Reactions by member nations ==
Bangladesh also pulled out of the summit in Islamabad. The Bangladeshi Foreign Ministry conveyed to the SAARC Chair Nepal that Pakistan's increasing interference in Bangladesh's domestic affairs is inimical to the interest of Bangladesh and under such circumstances it is not possible to participate in the summit at Islamabad. The ministry maintained that "Bangladesh, as the initiator of the SAARC process, remains steadfast in its commitment to regional cooperation, connectivity, and contacts but believes that these can only go forward in a more congenial atmosphere".

Afghanistan announced its withdrawal from the summit, stating, "Due to increased level of violence and fighting as a result of imposed terrorism on Afghanistan, (President) Ashraf Ghani with his responsibilities as the Commander-in-Chief will be fully engaged, and will not be able to attend the Summit."

Bhutan also withdrew from the summit. The country stated that the "recent escalation of terrorism in the region has seriously compromised the environment for the successful holding" of the summit. The Bhutanese government added that it also shared the concerns of some member states on the "deterioration of regional peace because of terror".

Sri Lanka, backing a call for postponing the 19th South Asian Association for Regional Cooperation (SAARC) Summit in Pakistan, said the prevailing environment in the region was not conducive for holding the event.

The Maldives, which initially refrained from boycotting and instead urged a conductive environment be created for the summit, later boycotted the event condemning international terrorism, especially those originating from outside.

Nepal, the current chair of SAARC, urged that "a conducive environment be created soon to ensure the participation of all member states in the 19th SAARC summit in line with the spirit of the SAARC charter". It also asked the member countries "to ensure that their respective territories are not used by terrorists for cross border terrorism".

Pakistan first postponed the conference to a further date, citing Article X (General Provisions) of the SAARC Charter that all decisions at all levels shall be taken on the basis of unanimity. However, after Maldives, sixth of the eight member nations, pulled out, Pakistan was forced to cancel the summit altogether.

== See also ==
- List of SAARC summits
- 2016 Uri attack
