= Latifi Press =

Pakistani Newspaper

Latifi Press was founded in 1933 in Delhi by Abdul Latif Khan. It printed several important publications for the Muslim League and most notably, first issue of Dawn newspaper, the mouth piece of Muslim League and edited by Muhammad Ali Jinnah, was printed here on 12 October 1942. The Press was partly burnt during the tumultuous partition of India into Bharat and Pakistan in 1947, and many of the machines were sold off mainly to Sanghites. Abdul Latif Khan subsequently migrated to Pakistan with his family in 1948. Among the notable publications printed at Latifi press were "The Illustrated Weekly of India", works by Khawaja Hasan Nizami, S. M. Hussain Zeki Velidi Togan, and Quranic Translations
