= Ahmad Noorani =

Pakistani investigative journalist

- Born: 1981 (age 44–45); Pakistan
- Occupation: Investigative journalist
- Years active: 2007–present
- Organization: Fact Focus
- Known for: Founding Fact Focus
- Notable work: Report on corruption by Asim Bajwa and Saqib Nisar; Report alleging nepotism involving relatives of Asim Munir

Ahmad Noorani (Urdu: احمد نورانی; born 1981) is a Pakistani investigative journalist based in the United States. He is the founder of Fact Focus. He formerly worked at The News International in Islamabad from 2007 to 2019, where he reported on issues such as alleged tax evasion by the family of Imran Khan, government corruption, real estate scandals, and other sensitive topics.

== Early life and education ==
Noorani was born in 1981 in Pakistan. He attended Columbia University, where he graduated with a master's degree in business journalism in 2023.

== Career ==
Noorani began his career at The News International in 2007. Noorani has faced threats and harassment during his work, including physical assaults by unidentified individuals demanding that he halt coverage of the military.

In October 2017, Noorani was attacked near the Zero Point in Islamabad when men on motorcycles stopped his vehicle, pulled him out of the car, and severely beat him. Noorani was hospitalized after losing consciousness from the attack.

Following ongoing threats, and public condemnation by the government, Noorani was dismissed from his position at The News International.

=== Fact Focus ===
After relocating abroad, Noorani founded Fact Focus in 2020, an online platform for data-driven investigative journalism. Operating from exile, Noorani manages a small team of seven contributors, primarily consisting of journalists remaining in Pakistan who also face challenges from authorities. Fact Focus is funded through subscriptions, donations, and volunteer contributions from its members. The platform has published investigations on topics such as military-run businesses, retirement plans of military officials, and the financial disclosures of politicians.

In August 2020, Noorani issued a report on the assets of Asim Bajwa's family.

In November 2021, Noorani uploaded an audio clip attributed to a former Chief Justice of the Supreme Court of Pakistan, Saqib Nisar, in which he was talking with other unknown people about putting pressure on the sentences of former Prime Minister Nawaz Sharif and his daughter Maryam Nawaz.

On 29 July 2024, Noorani published a major investigative report on Fact Focus exposing the operations of the "Blasphemy Business Group" (BBG), a syndicate accused of systematically entrapping young individuals through honey-trapping and fabricated evidence in blasphemy cases that carry the death penalty in Pakistan. Noorani was the first journalist to verify and declassify the Punjab Police Special Branch's confidential report titled "The Blasphemy Business," to public. He additionally provided detailed accounts of the group's alleged methods and key members, including lawyer Rao Abdul Raheem and Hassan Muavia (younger brother of religious scholar Hafiz Tahir Mahmood Ashrafi). Fact Focus continued its coverage into 2026, publishing follow-up reports that alleged collusion between members of the Blasphemy Business Group, officials in the FIA's Cyber Crimes Wing, and certain elements within the judiciary. These investigations drew significant attention to the misuse of blasphemy laws and contributed to public and institutional scrutiny of the cases. In September 2026, The Telegraph (UK) also published an exposé on the blasphemy business and credited sections of Fact Focus’s pioneering work in their report.

On 17 March 2025, Noorani published a report alleging that relatives and close associates of Asim Munir had interfered in key government appointments, securing top positions despite lacking merit or performance. The next day, about 20 armed men who identified themselves as police raided Noorani's family home and forcibly took away his two brothers to an undisclosed location. Reporters Without Borders (RSF) described the abduction as likely an act of retaliation for Noorani's reporting, while the Committee to Protect Journalists said that Noorani and his family's court petition linked the brothers' disappearance to his report. RSF further reported that local police denied any involvement.

On 20 April 2025, journalist Umar Cheema claimed, citing senior police officers, that Noorani's brothers had been recovered from Katcha dacoits.

== Personal life ==
Noorani was married to Journalist Ambreen Fatima. They divorced in 2021.
