= Zaffar Abbas =

Pakistani journalist

- ظفر عباس
- Occupation: Journalist
- Years active: 1980s–present
- Known for: Editor of Dawn
- Family: Mazhar Abbas (brother); Azhar Abbas (brother)

Zaffar Abbas is a Pakistani journalist who has been the editor of Pakistan's English-language newspaper Dawn, since October 2010.

== Career ==
Abbas started his journalism career in 1981 with The Star after joining the Dawn Media Group. Between 1984 and 1992, in addition to The Star, he also reported for the Khaleej Times as a correspondent. In 1988, he joined The Herald as senior reporter and went on to become its special correspondent in 1992 and then as its Bureau Chief. He has also worked for BBC as a correspondent in Islamabad and Karachi for about 16 years.

Abbas joined Dawn as the resident editor for its Islamabad edition in 2006. From June 2010, he served as Editor-designated for Dawn before assuming the charge as its 5th Editor in October 2010, replacing Abbas Nasir.

In 2015, Abbas was elected first chairman of Editors for Safety. The New York Times refer to Abbas as a respected political journalist.

In April 2017, Abbas's name was referred to the All Pakistan Newspapers Society due to his involvement in Dawn leaks by the Prime Minister's Office.

In November 2019, he was awarded the 2019 Gwen Ifill Press Freedom Award by the Committee to Protect Journalists (CPJ).
