= Khalid Mansoor =

Special Assistant to the Prime Minister of Pakistan

Khalid Mansoor was the Special Assistant to the Prime Minister of Pakistan on the China-Pakistan Economic Corridor, a position he has held from August 2021 to April 2022. He previously served as the Chief Executive of the Hub Power Company.
