= Abbas Nasir =

- Occupation: Journalist
- Years active: 1980's-present
- Known for: Editor, Dawn

Abbas Nasir is a Pakistani journalist and former editor of Pakistan's English language daily DAWN. Previously he was the head of the BBC Urdu Service, where he has been appointed as Executive Editor for the Asia and the Pacific Region at BBC World Service.

Nasir began his journalism career in the early 1980s at the daily newspapers Dawn and Muslim. He later joined the monthly current affairs magazine Herald. In May 1994 he joined the BBC Urdu Service while also serving as the chief political correspondent with the English daily The News International. Later he became head of the BBC Urdu service and helped found their website in October 1999. While with the BBC, he also worked on as an analyst on their The World Today programme. He was replaced by Zaffar Abbas as editor of Dawn in October 2010.
