= Altaf Husain =

Indian politician (1900–1968)

- আলতাফ হোসেইন الطاف حسين

Industry Minister of Pakistan
- In office 17 August 1965 – 15 May 1968
- President: FM Ayub Khan
- Preceded by: Abul Kashem Khan
- Succeeded by: VAdm Syed M. Ahsan

Editor–in–Chief of Dawn
- In office 14 August 1947 – 16 August 1965
- Preceded by: Office established
- Succeeded by: Ziauddin Suleri

Personal details
- Born: Altaf Husain; 26 January 1900 Kulaura, Sylhet, Bengal Presidency, British India (now Bangladesh)
- Died: 25 May 1968 (aged 68) Karachi, West Pakistan, Pakistan
- Resting place: Paposh nagar Nazimabad Cemetery
- Citizenship: British India (1900–47); Pakistan (1947–68)
- Party: Muslim League
- Relations: Abrar Husain (brother) Anwar Husain (brother) Ashfaq Husain (brother)
- Children: Ajmal Husain, Afsar Husain, Zeba Zubair, Ejaz Husain
- Parent: Maulvi Ahmedullah (father)
- Education: University of Calcutta; University of Dhaka
- Occupation: Journalist
- Known for: One of the pioneers of journalism in Pakistan
- Awards: Hilal-i-Pakistan (Crescent of Pakistan) Award by the Government of Pakistan in 1959

Altaf Husain (Bengali: আলতাফ হোসেইন, Urdu: الطاف حسين; 26 January 1900 – 25 May 1968) was an educationist, journalist, and Pakistan Movement activist. He is noted as one of the pioneers of print journalism in Pakistan and was the founding editor and the first editor-in-chief of English-language newspaper, Dawn, which he edited for almost twenty years.

In addition, he served as Industry Minister of Pakistan in the administration of President Ayub Khan from 1965 until resigning in 1968 for health reasons. He is widely regarded as one of the key activists in the Pakistan Movement and penned several critically important articles in support of the case of Indian Muslims in British Indian Empire. He translated Shikwa and Jawab-e-Shikwa by the poet Muhammad Iqbal from Urdu into rhymed English verse, in 1943.

== Biography ==
=== Education and government work ===
Altaf Husain was born in Deogaon in Kulaura, Moulvibazar District (formerly Assam, undivided Bengal) British India (now Bangladesh) into a family of Bengali Muslim zamindars, on 26 January 1900. His father was Ahmad Ullah. After receiving his education from Murari Chand College in Sylhet, Husain moved to Calcutta to attend the University of Calcutta where he studied English language. He earned a BA in English from Calcutta University and moved to Dhaka. He then attended the Dhaka University where he studied English Literature and subsequently earned an MA in English language from University of Dhaka in 1923.

Upon his graduation, he joined the Kolkata Municipal government where he became Director of Public Information from 1942 until 1943. He later proceeded to join the Indian Ministry of Information as press adviser. Although, he worked for the Indian government, he subsequently began to write political articles in the newspaper Statesman, Calcutta penning the fortnightly column "Through the Muslim Eyes" under the pen name, Ain-el-Mulk, which reflected the Muslim point of view.

=== Pakistan movement and Industry ministry ===
Shortly thereafter, he left the Indian Ministry of Information and started to write a column "Dar-el-Islam" (lit. "Door of Islam") for the Statesman but under the pen name, Shaheed (lit. Martyr). For a brief period of time, he also wrote columns for the Calcutta-based newspaper Star of India. During this time, his incisive writing won recognition and attention from Muhammad Ali Jinnah (founder of Pakistan) who had contacted him to meet him in his residency in Mumbai. Eventually, he was asked to take a position of editor-in-chief of the newspaper Dawn, which was founded by Jinnah in 1945. Earlier, Altaf Husain had first taken over the office in Delhi in 1944 and had begun printing Dawn.

As an editor-in-chief of Dawn, he came to public notice and prominence, and was admitted into Jinnah's close circle of advisers. In this capacity, he played a critically important role in the success of the Pakistan Movement which led to the creation of a separate homeland for the Muslims of the South Asia. After the establishment of Pakistan, he moved his senior staff from Delhi to Karachi while he continued his editorship of Dawn in Karachi and remained as editor from 1947 to 1965. His influence as the founding editor of the Dawn, his role in the Pakistan Movement and his extraordinary relationship with Jinnah meant that his was amongst the most influential voices outside the government. While defending East Pakistan's rights, he strongly assailed the idea of its separation from Pakistan. For some time, he joined the faculty of journalism at Karachi University to teach and instruct courses on journalism.

== Awards and honours ==
In 1959, his services were recognised by the Government of Pakistan and he was conferred with the Hilal-e-Pakistan (Crescent of Pakistan) Award, in a public ceremony in 1959.

== Industry minister ==
In 1965, he was invited by President Ayub Khan to join the government, which he surprised many by accepting. Ultimately, he was appointed Industry Minister of Pakistan and oversaw the rapid industrialisation as well as the process of privatisation in Pakistan. He retained the ministry until 1968 when he resigned due to poor health.

=== Death and legacy ===
Altaf Husain resigned from the Industry ministry 10 days before his death. He died on 25 May 1968 and was buried with state honours in Model Colony cemetery. The street in Karachi where Dawn was first published is today known as Altaf Husain Road.

Regarded as a model by young writers, he excelled in the role of the crusader. Dawn newspaper remarked eight years after his death:

Altaf Husain was basically a crusader; his chief weapon was his powerful pen. His commitment to the cause of the Muslims of this subcontinent was total; his loyalty to the Pakistan Movement and its great leader unflinching and unshakable. Like every great fighter, he fought bravely and relentlessly. He gave no quarter and asked for none. And like every great editor, he was resented and loved, feared and respected, praised and derided . . . . Altah Husain joined Dawn, Delhi, as editor and plunged himself heart and soul in the titanic struggle for Pakistan. Soon his editorials became the most important exposition of the Muslim League point of view. He wrote with passion, and argued with rare force, clarity and perseverance. Dawn became the focal point of League politics. It had the blessings of the Quaid himself and was managed by no less a person than Liaquat Ali Khan. Altaf Husain fought single-handedly all the great Congress newspapers and cast terror in the Congress camp.

— Editor-in-Chief of Dawn, source

== See also ==
- List of Pakistani journalists
