= 18th SAARC summit =

18th SAARC summit १८औं सार्क शिखर सम्मेलन
- Leaders at SAARC Summit
- Host country: Nepal
- Date: 26–27 November 2014
- Motto: Deeper Integration for Peace and Prosperity
- Cities: Kathmandu
- Venues: National Assembly Hall
- Participants: SAARC members
- Chair: Sushil Koirala, Prime Minister of Nepal
- Follows: 17th SAARC summit
- Precedes: 19th SAARC summit (cancelled)

The eighteenth summit of the South Asian Association of Regional Cooperation (SAARC) was held in Kathmandu, the capital of Nepal on 26–27 November 2014. The theme of the summit was Deeper Integration for Peace and Prosperity, focused on enhancing connectivity between the member states for easier transit-transport across the region. Sushil Koirala, the then Nepalese prime minister, was the main host of the event which took place in Rastriya Sabha Griha The summit took place after an interval of three years as the previous summit was held in 2011 in Maldives.

== Background ==
On 26 May 2014, head of state/head of government of all SAARC nations attended the Swearing-in ceremony of Narendra Modi in New Delhi and the following day they have held high level discussion with the newly appointed Indian Prime Minister Narendra Modi which was dubbed as the mini SAARC summit in the media. There it was agreed to revitalize the SAARC initiative and a summit was agreed upon in Nepal at the earliest. Started on November 26, the two-day SAARC Summit was the 18th session of the multilateral organisation. times of India

== Participants ==
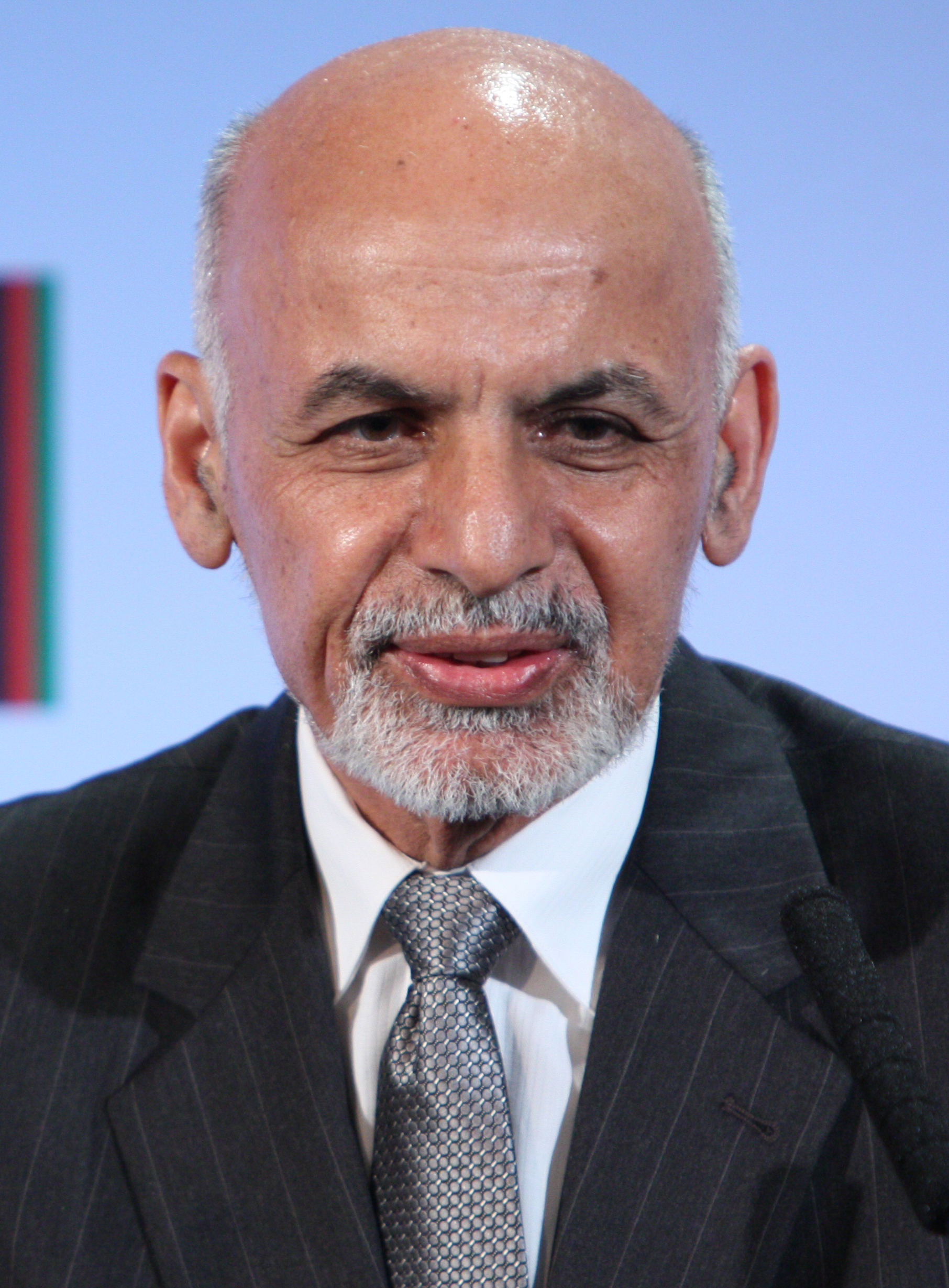
Afghanistan
Ashraf Ghani,
President

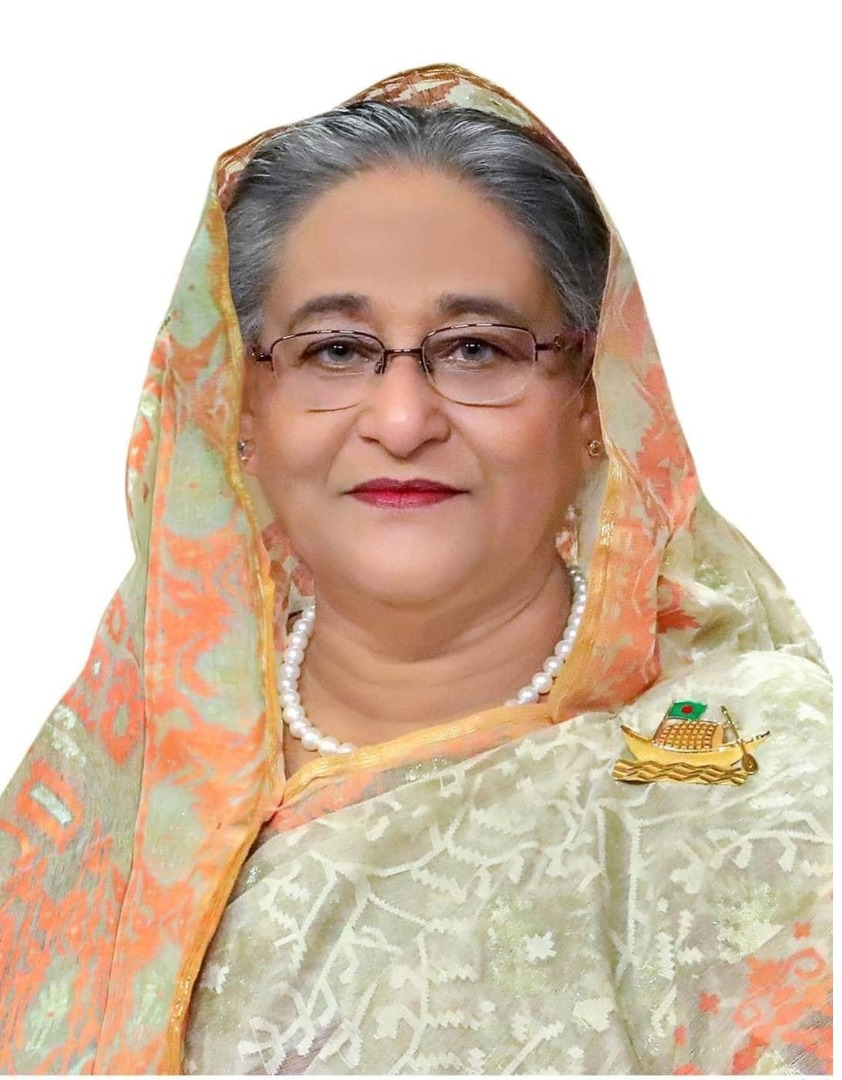
Bangladesh
Sheikh Hasina,
Prime Minister

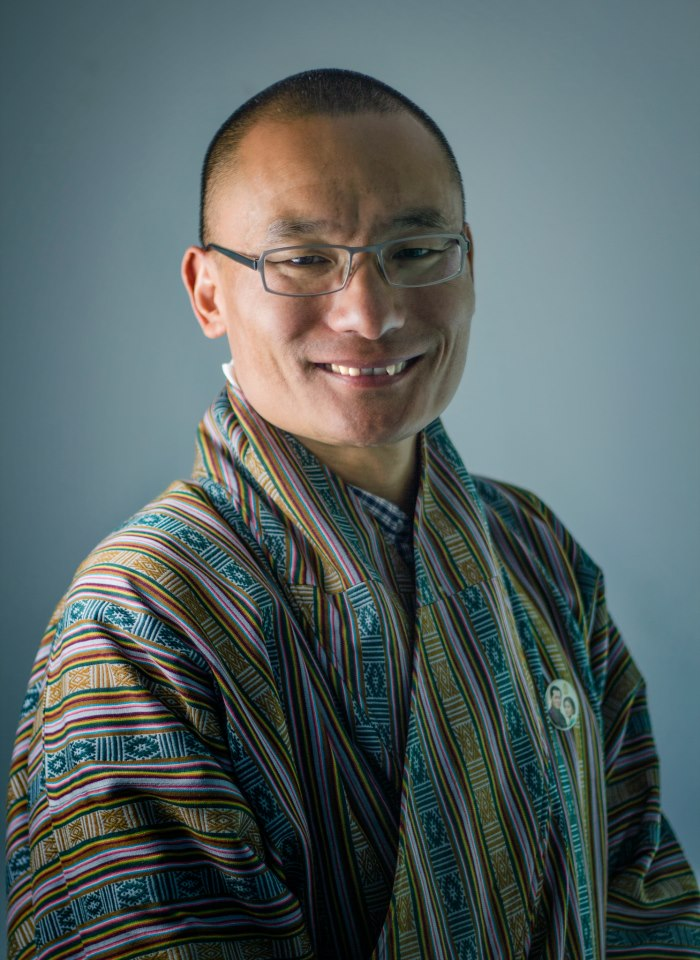
Bhutan
Tshering Tobgay,
Prime Minister

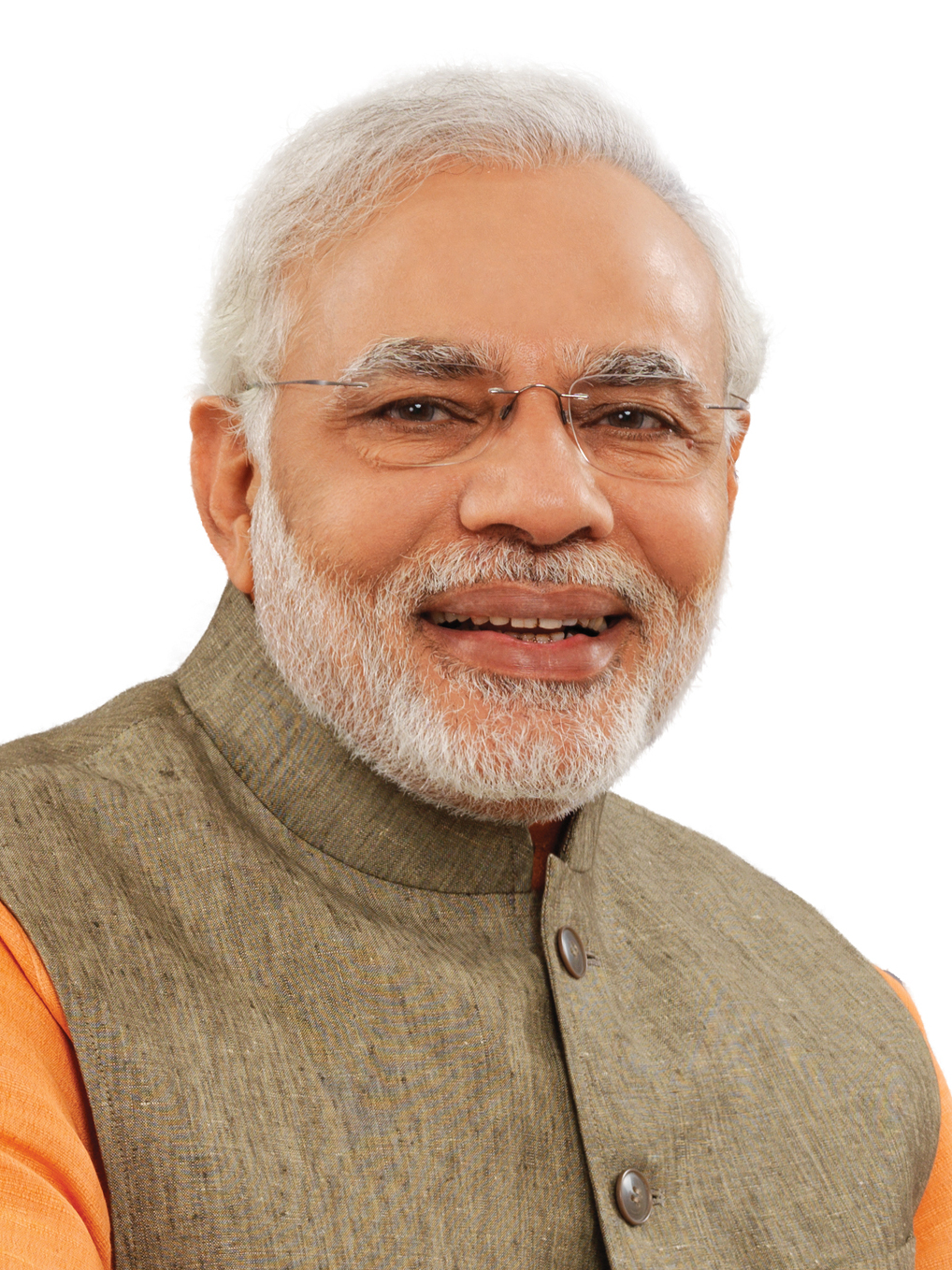
India
Narendra Modi,
Prime Minister

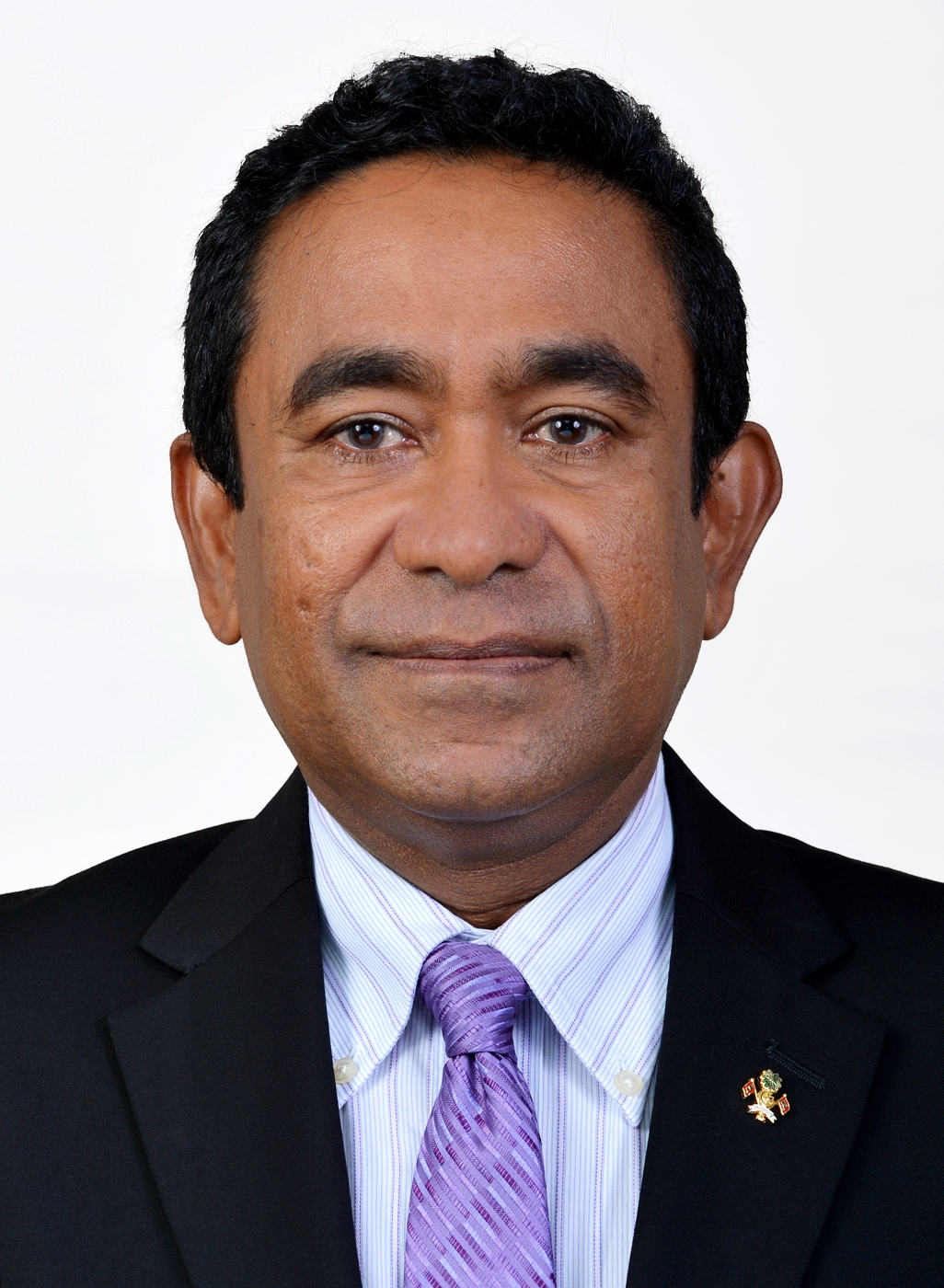
Maldives
Abdulla Yameen,
President

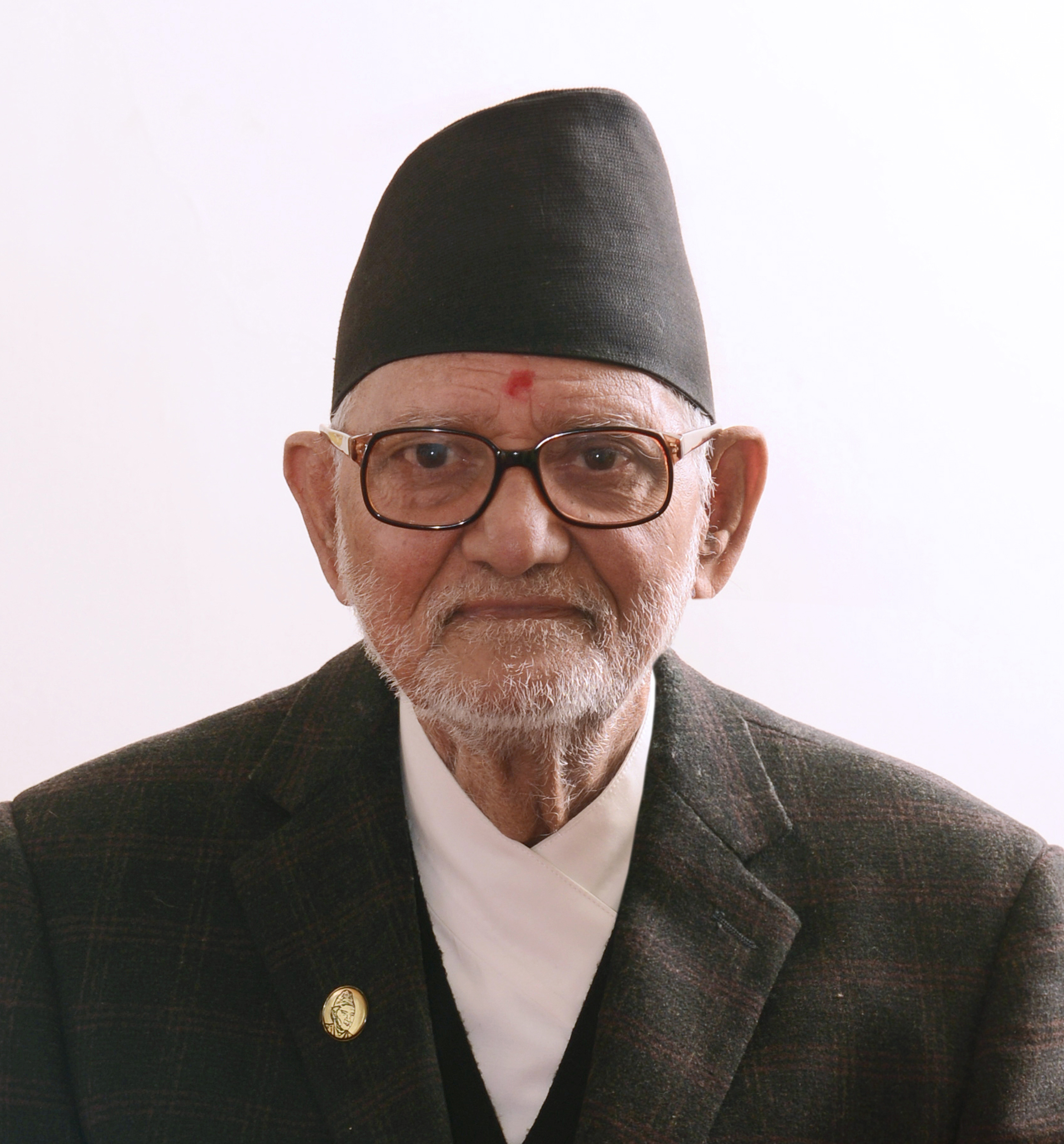
Nepal
Sushil Koirala (Host),
Prime Minister

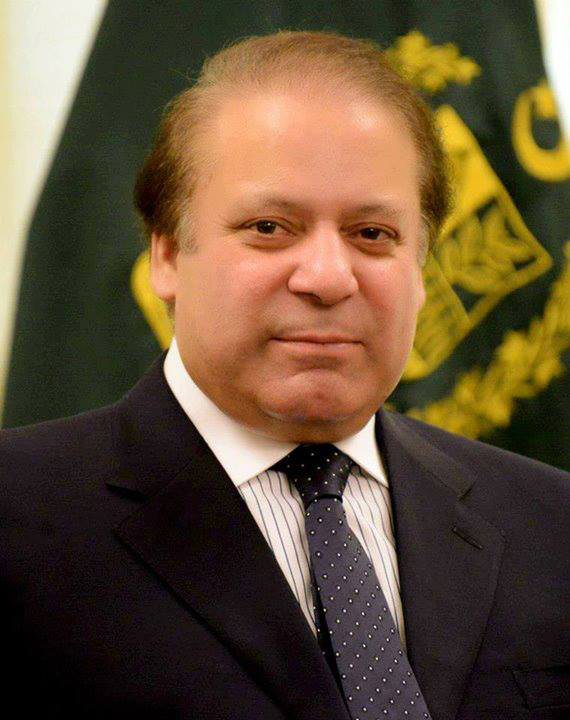
Pakistan
Nawaz Sharif,
Prime Minister

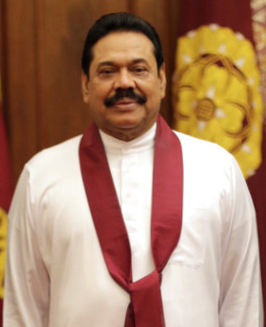
Sri Lanka
Mahinda Rajapaksa,
President

== Agenda ==
Foreign Ministers of the eight member states signed an agreement on energy cooperation namely 'SAARC Framework Agreement for Energy Cooperation (Electricity)' in the presence of their heads of state and government during the concluding ceremony of the 18th SAARC Summit on 27 November. Although Pakistan stalled, citing insufficient internal preparations, signing of two other agreements on Vehicular Traffic and Railways respectively. Although Nepalese Prime Minister Sushil Koirala, current SAARC Chair, expressed his hope that the 'Regulation of Passenger and Cargo Vehicular Traffic amongst SAARC Member States', and 'SAARC Regional Agreement on Railways' would be signed later after the Transport Ministers of these countries reviewed them. It was also decided that Pakistan will host the next summit in 2016.

The India-Pakistan stand-off on the first day threatened to jeopardize the entire summit process as Pakistan seemed to be in the mood to block every Indian led proposal. But the next day things have changed when the two prime ministers met privately at the retreat session which led to Pakistan agreeing one out of three proposed agreements and they also met and shook hands publicly during the closing ceremony and this 'transient peace' in the relation was believed to brokered by the Nepalese side as a face-saving measure for the Kathmandu summit.

China, which holds an observer status in the group, was represented by Vice Foreign Minister Liu Zhenmin seen actively promoting a more active role for itself in the region including infrastructure funding through its proposed 'Asian Infrastructure Investment Bank' (AIIB) and extending its ambitious Maritime Silk Road project to South Asian nations. Pakistan, China's all weather friend, also vouched for a more participatory role for the observer nations in the summit process, indirectly advocating for a more Chinese involvement. Although no such proposal was accepted because of India's reservation.

== Aftermath ==
With the ongoing cold relationships between India and Pakistan, the formal handshake between the prime ministers from both the countries caught a lot of attention and was applauded by everyone in the Summit Hall. In this way the 18th SAARC summit was over

== See also ==
- List of SAARC summits
- Declaration of 18th SAARC Summit
- SAARC satellite
