= Declaration of 18th SAARC Summit =

This page intentionally has no description

The Declaration of 18th SAARC Summit was made during the SAARC Summit 2014 in Nepal. The 18th SAARC summit was held in Kathmandu, Nepal, from 26 to 27 November 2014. The heads of state of the eight SAARC member countries and their delegations met during the summit to discuss the SAARC agenda and review previous implementations. They recognized that after nearly thirty years of the organization's existence, it was time to reinvigorate regional cooperation and revitalize SAARC as an effective vehicle to fulfill the developmental aspirations of the peoples of South Asia. Determined to deepen regional integration for peace and prosperity through mutual trust, amity, and cooperation, the leaders made the 18th SAARC Summit Declaration. They scheduled the 19th SAARC summit to be held in Pakistan.

== Declarations made in the summit ==
=== Regional cooperation ===
The Heads of State or Government expressed their strong determination to deepen regional integration for peace, stability, and prosperity in South Asia by intensifying cooperation—inter alia, in trade, investment, finance, energy, security, infrastructure, connectivity, and culture—and implementing projects, programmes, and activities in a prioritized, result-oriented, and time-bound manner.

=== South Asian Economic Union (SAEU) ===
The leaders renewed their commitment to achieve the South Asian Economic Union (SAEU) in a phased and planned manner through a Free Trade Area, a Customs Union, a Common Market, and a Common Economic and Monetary Union.

The leaders acknowledged that SAARC member states, particularly the least developed and landlocked member states, face structural constraints and challenges that result in weak productive capacity, affecting their competitiveness in external trade due to, among other things, high trade and transit costs. They committed to enhancing support to the least developed and landlocked member states in their development efforts, with a view to ensuring equitable benefits of free trade arrangements. In this context, they agreed to implement effectively the existing preferential facilities under SAFTA and SATIS.

=== SAFTA and Trade Facilitation ===
The leaders directed the SAFTA Ministerial Council and the SAFTA Committee of Experts to accelerate free trade in goods and services in the region by putting into operation simplified and transparent rules of origin; implementing trade facilitation measures; harmonizing standards relating to Technical Barriers to Trade (TBT) and sanitary and phytosanitary measures; harmonizing, streamlining, and simplifying customs procedures; eliminating non-tariff and para-tariff barriers; and ensuring smooth and efficient transit and transport facilities. They also called for early operationalization of SATIS by finalizing the schedule of commitments.

They called for timely and comprehensive reforms of the global economic and financial architecture to make it inclusive and responsive to the needs of Least Developed, Land-locked, and Small Island Developing States (SIDS). They reaffirmed that SIDS would require special attention in view of their unique circumstances and particular vulnerabilities in realizing sustainable development.

=== SAARC Development Fund ===
They agreed to strengthen the Social Window of the SAARC Development Fund (SDF) and to operationalize its Economic Window and Infrastructure Window as soon as possible for the effective implementation of regional and sub-regional projects. In that context, they stressed the expeditious development of projects under the SDF addressing the livelihood issues of the peoples of the region. They agreed to expand the Governing Board of the SDF by including a representative of the National Focal Point of the Member States.

=== Connectivity ===
Heads of State or Government welcomed the significant progress toward finalizing the SAARC Motor Vehicles Agreement and the SAARC Regional Railways Agreement. They agreed to hold a meeting of the Transport Ministers within three months to finalize the Agreements for approval. They renewed their commitment to substantially enhance regional connectivity in a seamless manner by building and upgrading roads, railways, waterway infrastructure, energy grids, communications, and air links to ensure the smooth cross-border flow of goods, services, capital, technology, and people. The leaders emphasized the need for linking South Asia with contiguous regions, including Central Asia and beyond, by all modes of connectivity. They directed relevant authorities to initiate national, regional, and sub-regional measures and necessary arrangements.

=== Energy ===
The Leaders directed the relevant SAARC bodies and mechanisms to identify regional and sub-regional projects in the area of power generation, transmission, and power trade—including hydropower, natural gas, solar, wind, and bio-fuel—and to implement them with high priority with a view to meeting the increasing demand for power in the region. The Leaders welcomed the signing of the SAARC Framework Agreement for Energy Cooperation (Electricity).

=== Poverty Alleviation ===
The Leaders reiterated their strong commitment to free South Asia from poverty and directed the Ministerial and Secretary-level mechanisms on poverty alleviation to review progress and revisit the SAARC Plan of Action and its effective implementation, also taking into account the Post-2015 Development Agenda.

They recognized the potential of cooperatives in achieving inclusive, broad-based, and sustainable economic growth and development, and called for the sharing of experiences, expertise, and best practices in this sector.

=== Post-2015 Development Goals ===
The Leaders recognized that the Post-2015 Development Agenda, following its adoption at the United Nations, would present opportunities to complement national and regional efforts on sustainable development. They directed the initiation of an Inter-Governmental process to appropriately contextualize the Sustainable Development Goals (SDGs) at the regional level.

=== Agriculture and Food Security ===
The Heads of State or Government agreed to increase investment, promote research and development, facilitate technical cooperation, and apply innovative, appropriate, and reliable technologies in the agriculture sector to enhance productivity and ensure food and nutritional security in the region. They also underscored the importance of promoting sustainable agriculture. The Leaders directed the elimination of the threshold criteria from the SAARC Food Bank Agreement so as to enable the Member States to avail themselves of food grains during both emergency and normal time food difficulty. The Leaders urged early ratification of the SAARC Seed Bank Agreement and directed the constitution of the Seed Bank Board, pending completion of ratification by all Member States. The Leaders also directed the relevant SAARC bodies to finalize the establishment of the Regional Vaccine Bank and the Regional Livestock Gene Bank.

=== Environment ===
They directed the relevant bodies and mechanisms to effectively implement the SAARC Agreement on Rapid Response to Natural Disasters, the SAARC Convention on Cooperation on Environment, and the Thimphu Statement on Climate Change, including taking into account the existential threats posed by climate change to some SAARC Member States. They welcomed the decision to establish the SAARC Environment and Disaster Management Centre. The Leaders underlined the urgency for the global community to arrive at a Protocol, another legal instrument, or an agreed outcome with legal force applicable to all by the end of 2015, based on the principles of Common but Differentiated Responsibility (CBDR), Respective Capabilities, and Equity under the UNFCCC.

=== Blue Economy ===
They recognized the manifold contributions of the ocean-based Blue Economy in the SAARC Region and the need for collaboration and partnership in this area.

=== Health ===
The Leaders recognized the importance of achieving universal health coverage (UHC), improving health regulatory systems, preparedness for emerging and reemerging diseases, and the challenges posed by antimicrobial resistance and non-communicable diseases. They endorsed the Malé Resolution on Regional Health Issues adopted at the Fourth Meeting of the SAARC Health Ministers. They urged continued remarkable progress by SAARC countries in the last decade in response to AIDS, with the aim of ending the AIDS epidemic in the region by 2030. They also directed the completion of all necessary processes for upgrading the SAARC TB Reference Laboratory at the SAARC TB and HIV/AIDS Centre (STAC), Kathmandu, to a Supra-national Reference Laboratory, with necessary funding from the SDF.

=== Education ===
The Heads of State or Government expressed their resolve to eliminate illiteracy from the region, in line with the global goal of education for all, and to ensure quality education in all institutions by reforming curricula, teaching methods, and evaluation systems, adequately supported by physical, technical, and other facilities. The leaders agreed to promote regional cooperation in the field of vocational education and training. They directed their Education Ministers to develop a Regional Strategy for Enhancing the Quality of Education in order to raise the standards of South Asian educational institutions and better serve the youth in the region. The Leaders welcomed the progress with regard to the South Asian University.

=== Youth ===
They emphasized the need to adopt appropriate national policies and programmes for utilizing the youth force and their skills for economic and social development, especially through the creation of productive self-employment opportunities. The Leaders welcomed the declaration of July 15 as World Youth Skills Day at the 69th Session of the UN General Assembly and agreed to commemorate, as appropriate, the said event through SAARC.

=== Women and Children ===
They directed the relevant authorities to take effective measures to prevent the trafficking in women and children and their exploitation.

=== Social Protection ===
The Leaders acknowledged the special needs of the elderly, women, children, differently-abled persons, unemployed persons, and persons working at hazardous sites, and agreed to develop and strengthen social protection for them and to share best practices in this regard.

=== Migration ===
They also agreed to collaborate and cooperate on the safe, orderly, and responsible management of labour migration from South Asia to ensure the safety, security, and well-being of their migrant workers in destination countries outside the region.

=== Science and Technology ===
The Leaders agreed to develop the capacity of the Member States to apply space technology for socio-economic development and the welfare of the peoples through experience sharing among themselves. In this context, they welcomed the offer of India to develop and launch a satellite dedicated to SAARC Countries.

=== Telecommunication ===
The Leaders directed collaboration and engagement among public authorities and private stakeholders in the Member States to lower telephone tariff rates and facilitate greater contacts among the people of the region, and called for the rationalization of tariff structures.

=== Tourism ===
The Leaders expressed their resolve to make South Asia an attractive common tourist destination in a sustainable manner. They directed relevant bodies to effectively implement the SAARC Action Plan on Tourism (2006), particularly through initiating appropriate public-private collaboration. They also called for the effective and full implementation of their existing decision to charge nationals of SAARC Member States fees for entry into archaeological and heritage sites as applicable to their own nationals.

=== Culture ===
They directed the effective implementation of the SAARC Agenda for Culture and agreed to take measures to preserve and restitute South Asian cultural property and create a SAARC heritage list together with operational guidelines. They declared 2016 as the SAARC Year of Cultural Heritage and tasked the relevant bodies with developing an action plan for its success. They also agreed to develop a cultural trail linking major Buddhist historical sites in the region. The Leaders further agreed to facilitate access for persons visiting prominent and holy sites of Islam, Hinduism, Christianity, and all other major religions in South Asia.

=== Media ===
The Leaders, recognizing the reach and influence of media, urged both public and private media to share responsibility in efforts to promote understanding and cohesiveness among the SAARC Member States and their peoples.

=== Combating Terrorism and trans-national Crimes ===
The Leaders unequivocally condemned terrorism and violent extremism in all its forms and manifestations and underlined the need for effective cooperation among the Member States to combat them. They directed respective authorities to ensure the full and effective implementation of the SAARC Regional Convention on Suppression of Terrorism and its Additional Protocol, including through enacting necessary legislation at the national level to root out terrorism. They reiterated their call for the early conclusion of a UN Comprehensive Convention on International Terrorism. They agreed to take effective measures to combat the illicit trafficking of narcotics and psychotropic substances, arms smuggling, money laundering, counterfeit currency, and other transnational crimes. They also agreed to establish a cybercrime monitoring desk.

=== Governance ===
They reiterated their strong commitment to ensure good governance for sustainable development by promoting accountability, transparency, the rule of law, and people's participation at all levels of governance.

The Leaders, while expressing satisfaction over the steady progress in democratization in South Asia, committed to further promote and institutionalize peace, stability, democracy, and development as the common aspirations of the peoples of South Asia. In this context, they agreed on the need for cooperation and collaboration within SAARC on issues of common interest and concern to Member States.

=== Strengthening SAARC processes ===
The Heads of State or Government acknowledged the need to enhance the visibility and stature of SAARC in international fora by, inter alia, forging common positions on issues of mutual interest and seeking group recognition in various multilateral institutions.

The Leaders directed all SAARC bodies, including the Council of Ministers, sectoral Ministerial bodies, and other bodies and institutions, to develop outcome-oriented policies, programmes, projects, and activities. The Leaders directed the rationalization of the work of the SAARC mechanisms, which could be reviewed inter-governmentally every three years by a regular session of the Standing Committee with a view to evaluating performance, achievements, and constraints.

The Leaders agreed to enhance the role of the Secretariat, commensurate with the objectives of SAARC, its areas of cooperation, as well as the decisions and agreements reached in the past. They committed to enhancing the institutional capacity of the SAARC Secretariat, in keeping with emerging realities, to enable it to fulfill the responsibilities entrusted to it in an effective and efficient manner.

The Leaders expressed satisfaction with the decision to rationalize the number and activities of SAARC Regional Centres through their selective closure and merger. They reiterated their resolve to make the remaining SAARC Regional Centres and specialized institutions efficient, effective, and result-oriented, and directed these institutions to initiate programmes and projects that produce tangible outcomes.

They agreed to henceforth hold the meetings of the SAARC Summit every two years or earlier, if necessary, the Council of Ministers once a year, the Standing Committee at least once a year, and the Programming Committee at least twice a year. They also agreed to make the Programming Committee a Charter body of SAARC.

== Nineteenth Summit ==
The Leaders welcomed the offer of the Government of Islamic Republic of Pakistan to host the Nineteenth Summit of SAARC in 2016. Although the summit was initially delayed, it was subsequently rescheduled for Islamabad. The date was uncertain but was later set for 15–19 November 2016.
