= Altaf Gauhar =

Civil servant, writer and journalist

Altaf Hussain Gauhar Janjua (17 March 1923 – 14 November 2000) was a civil servant, journalist, poet, and writer from Pakistan, close to the country's first military dictator Ayub Khan to the point that his detractors called him Khan's Svengali and Goebbels.

== Early life and education ==
Gauhar was born in Gujranwala on 17 March 1923 into a Punjabi family of the Rajput-Janjua clan to Raja Tafazzal Hussain Janjua, a minor government official, as the eldest of his five children. Gauhar did his post graduation in English literature from the Government College University, Lahore.

Before partition Gauhar worked as a broadcaster on All India Radio.

== Civil service career ==
Gauhar entered the Civil Service of Pakistan in 1948. Starting his career as Secretary, State Bank of Pakistan. He rose to be Information Secretary Government of Pakistan at the age of 39. During his tenure, draconian laws governing the press were passed, something for which Gauhar later publicly apologised.

He was a gifted writer and became very close to President Ayub Khan, so much so that he was known as the de facto vice president of Pakistan. He was the main ghost writer for the latter's autobiography entitled Friends Not Masters, published 1967. After the death of his old mentor, he wrote the biography, Ayub Khan : Pakistan's First Military Ruler. The last official act of the dictator Ayub Khan before handing over power as president was to invite Altaf Gauhar to lunch with his family and bestow on him the high civil award of Hilal-i-Quaid-i-Azam. Through some palace intrigues, another military dictator, Yahya Khan, assumed power on 25 March 1969. A day or two before that he had had a serious altercation with Altaf Gauhar who wanted Ayub Khan to continue. In 1969, Gauhar was initially marginalized as Director Finance Services Academy Lahore, a position much lower in rank than a Central Secretary. Subsequently, he was dismissed from service and all his four civil awards were forfeited.

== Post civil service career ==
On leaving the civil service in 1969, he became editor of the Pakistani daily newspaper Dawn in 1970. Later, when Zulfikar Ali Bhutto was chief martial law administrator, he was twice imprisoned. It was while in jail, that Gauhar became deeply absorbed by the Quran, from which he was later to make several distinguished translations, the last one shortly before he died, when he was in great pain and undergoing chemotherapy for cancer.

On release from prison, he left Dawn newspaper and went to London and launched the journals Third World Review and Third World Quarterly (in association with The Guardian newspaper), South magazine, and established the Third World Foundation. After BCCI went into liquidation, he returned to Pakistan, and continued into journalism. He exclusively devoted himself to the role of editor-in-chief of the Muslim magazine.

== Death ==
Towards the end of his life, Gauhar restricted himself to an occasional column in the newspaper The Muslim, but left the newspaper when its editor, A. B. S. Jafri, was sacked by the owner. According to newspaper, The Guardian, "In Pakistan, on his death, he was commemorated as "a very eminent Pakistani", a man who knew power and how it could be used or abused".

Altaf Gauhar died of prostate cancer on 14 November 2000 at the age of 77 years. Among his survivors were his wife, a son Humayun Gauhar and two daughters. The President of Pakistan Muhammad Rafiq Tarar, many ministers and national luminaries attended his funeral in Islamabad.

== Bibliography ==
=== Urdu ===
- Nai Bengali afsanai, 1955. Translation of modern short stories from the Bengali language.
- Teḥrīren̲ cand, 1995. Articles on Urdu literature; includes some poems.
- Ayyūb K̲h̲ān, faujī rāj ke pahle das sāl, 1995. Historical study of the first 10 years of the rule of Mohammad Ayub Khan, 1907–1974 as a chief martial law administrator, written by the information secretary of his government.
- Likhte rahe jinon̲ kī ḥikāyat, 1997. Articles on socio-political conditions in Pakistan arranged chronologically from 1993 to 1996.
- Gauhar-i guzashtah, 2007. Autobiography.

=== English ===
- Twenty years of Pakistan, 1947–1967, 1967.
- Translations from the Quran, 1975. V. 1. A charter of human liberty. The original path. A people most balances. The fall of a nation. The arrogance of reason. There is no compulsion in religion. Ibrahim's prayer. In moments of distress. v. 2. The Qur'anic concept of justice. The doctrine of abrogation. On prohibition. On interest.
- The Islamic concept of world economic order, 1977.
- The Challenge of Islam, 1978. Edited by Altaf Gauhar.
- Third World strategy : economic and political cohesion in the South, 1983. Edited by Altaf Gauhar; contributions by Ali Ahmed Attiga [and others].
- The Rich and the poor : development, negotiations, and cooperation : an assessment, 1983. Papers from the Beijing South-South Conference, held 4–7 April 1983 in Peking, edited by Altaf Gauhar.
- South-south strategy, 1983. Edited by Altaf Gauhar.
- Talking about development, 1983. Edited by Altaf Gauhar.
- Shared horizon : interviews with leaders of thought, 1985.
- Regional integration : the Latin American experience, 1985. This book seeks to explain why regional integration, originally perceived as vital to the development of Latin America, now finds these countries among the most adversely affected by the present economic crisis. At this crucial juncture in their development, when most of Latin America is faced with a gigantic debt burden and unprecedented social and political instability, the contributors to this book call for a review of the framework under which regional integration presently operates. The book outlines and discusses new formulae to make integration workable within the constraints of the present economic conditions and pressures facing Latin American countries.
- Pakistan: elections for survival: open letter to Prime Minister Junejo, 1987.
- Arab petrodollars : dashed hope for a new economic order, 1987.
- Ayub Khan: Pakistan's First Military Ruler, 1996. A candid account of Ayub's rule. The much-publicized Decade of Reforms, the inner story of Ayub's election struggle against his chief contender, Miss Jinnah, and the story behind the Tashkent Declaration and the Agartala Conspiracy, are all under scrutiny. This analyses the 'two pleas' sent by Nehru to Kennedy and the resulting correspondence, and throws light on subjects that were previously unknown or shrouded in mystery
- Thoughts and after thoughts, 1998. Collection of articles previously published in a Daily "The Nation" during 1995 – 1998.
