= Dawn (newspaper) =

Pakistani newspaper

- Front page, 1 January 2015
- Type: Daily newspaper
- Format: Broadsheet
- Owner: Dawn Media Group
- Founder: Muhammad Ali Jinnah
- Editor: Zaffar Abbas
- Founded: 26 October 1941; 85 years ago
- Political alignment: Centre-left
- Language: English
- Headquarters: Karachi, Sindh, Pakistan
- ISSN: 1563-9444
- Website: dawn.com

Dawn is a Pakistani English-language newspaper that was launched in British India by Muhammad Ali Jinnah in 1941. It is the largest English newspaper in Pakistan, and is widely considered the country's newspaper of record. Dawn is the flagship publication of the Dawn Media Group, which also owns local communication radio wave station CityFM89 as well as the marketing and media magazine Aurora.

Muhammad Ali Jinnah, Pakistan's founding father, launched the newspaper in Delhi on 26 October 1941, with the goal of establishing it as a mouthpiece for the All-India Muslim League. The first issue was printed at Latifi Press on 12 October 1942. Based in Karachi, it also maintains offices in Lahore, Peshawar, Quetta and the capital city of Islamabad, in addition to having correspondents abroad. As of 2010, it has a weekday circulation of over 95,446. The newspaper's current chief editor is Zaffar Abbas.

== History ==
Muhammad Ali Jinnah, founder of the Dawn newspaper

Dawn began as a weekly publication, based in New Delhi. Under the instruction of Jinnah, it became the official organ of the All India Muslim League in Delhi, and the sole voice of the Muslims League in the English language, reflecting and espousing the cause of Pakistan's creation. Jinnah summed up the paper's purpose in these words:

"The Dawn will mirror faithfully the views of Hindustan's Muslims and the All Hindustan Muslim League in all its activities: economic, educational and social and more particularly political, throughout the country fearlessly and independently and while its policy will be, no doubt, mainly to advocate and champion the cause of the Muslims and the policy and programme of the All Hindustan Muslim League, it will not neglect the cause and welfare of the peoples of this sub-continent generally".

Dawn became a daily newspaper in October 1944 under the leadership of its editor, Pothan Joseph. He later resigned that year to take the position of the government's principal information officer, leaving in part because of differences with Jinnah over the Pakistan Movement. He was succeeded by Altaf Husain, whose editorials galvanized the Muslims of India for independence. This earned him the ire of the Congress Party and of Lord Mountbatten, the last Viceroy and Governor-General of the British Raj, both of whom wanted a united India.

In 1947, due to the Partition of India, senior Dawn staff led by Altaf Husain moved to Karachi. That city subsequently became the head office of the newspaper.

In 1950, for a brief period, the owners discontinued Dawn over ownership issues. They restarted it as Herald.

Between 2024 and 2025, Dawn faced an unannounced ban from government advertisements, which led to a financial crisis. Later in late 2025, the ban extended to the paper's radio and TV outlets. In response, Dawn published an editorial titled "Gagging the media". This criticised the singling out of the publishing house and alleged that certain "dummy publications" were patronised instead for pleasing the influential backers of the government at the time.

On 12 November 2025, Dawn mistakenly printed a business report that still contained a ChatGPT prompt, violating the paper's own AI-use policy. It later retracted the text with a public apology.

== Features ==
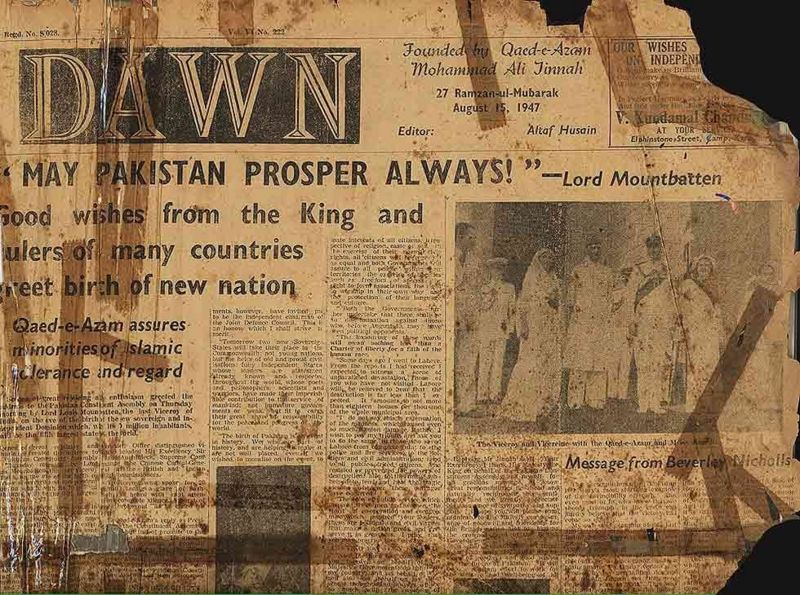
Issue of Dawn newspaper published from Karachi on 15 August 1947

Dawn regularly carries syndicated articles from western newspapers such as The Independent, The Guardian, the Los Angeles Times and The Washington Post.

On Sundays, the weekend advertiser carries three sections namely "Ad Buzz", "Career", and "Real Estate".

== Publication of the US diplomatic cables ==
On 19 May 2011, Dawn Media Group signed a memorandum of understanding with Julian Assange, founder of WikiLeaks, for the exclusive first use in Pakistan of all the secret US diplomatic cables related to political and other developments in the country.

An announcement printed in the newspaper and posted on the website read:

The Dawn Media Group and Julian Assange, Chief Executive of Sunshine Press Productions, the publishing arm of WikiLeaks, have signed a Memorandum of Understanding for the exclusive first use in Pakistan of all the secret US diplomatic cables related to political and other developments in the country.

== Resignation of Pervaiz Rashid ==
In 2016, a story, "Act against militants or face international isolation, civilians tell military" by Cyril Almeida, assistant editor and columnist for Dawn, triggered the resignation of Information Minister Pervaiz Rashid, after a preliminary investigation established a "lapse" on his part vis-à-vis the publication of the "planted" story.

== Editorial stance ==
Dawn's editorial stance has varied according to its editors and the political context. Altaf Husain, the second editor, was known for confrontational editorials that challenged government policies and supported the Pakistan Muslim League. His foreign policy view favored a US military alliance before shifting to support ties with China.

Following Husain, a succession of editors implemented different policies. Jamil Ansari aligned with the Ayub Khan administration, while Yusuf Haroon adopted a conservative approach to maintain independence. Altaf Gauhar, who had previously been involved in creating press laws, transitioned to advocating for free speech. His successor, Mazhar Ali Khan, introduced a progressive stance focused on professional journalism and reasoned critique.

Ahmad Ali Khan, the longest serving editor, stabilized the newspaper's direction. He balanced a progressive outlook with cautious navigation of the restrictive environment under Muhammad Zia-ul-Haq, allowing for subtle critiques of the regime.

Later editors included Saleem Asmi, who expanded arts coverage and launched new editions, and Abbas Nasir, who adapted the newspaper to the digital age by increasing its online presence.

== Editors ==
- Pothan Joseph (1944)
- Altaf Husain (1944–1965)
- Jamil Ansari (1965–1966)
- Yusuf Haroon (1966)
- Altaf Gauhar (1969–1973)
- Mazhar Ali Khan (1973)
- Ahmad Ali Khan (1973–2000)
- Saleem Asmi (2000–2003)
- Tahir Mirza (2003–2006)
- Abbas Nasir (2006–2010)
- Zaffar Abbas (2010–present)

== See also ==
- Dawn News
- List of newspapers in Pakistan
