= Altaf =

Altaf or Altaff (Arabic: الطاف) is a masculine given name and surname of Arabic origin. Notable people with the name include:

== Given name ==
- Altaf Ali (born 1944), Bangladeshi politician
- Altaf Bukhari (born 1958), Indian politician
- Altaf Ali Chowdhury (1888–1944), Bengali politician
- Altaf Hossain Chowdhury (born 1942/43), Bangladeshi politician
- Altaf Hossain Chowdhury (Faridpur politician), Bangladeshi politician
- Altafur Rahman Chowdhury (died 2018), Bangladeshi politician
- Altaf Fatima (1927–2018), Pakistani author
- Altaf Gauhar (1923–2000), Pakistani civil servant, journalist, poet, and writer
- Altaf Hossain Golandaz (1947–2007), Bangladeshi politician
- Altaf Haider (1937–2020), Bangladeshi freedom fighter
- Altaf Hussain Hali (1837–1914), Indian Urdu poet
- Altaf Hossain (politician) (1934–2009), Bangladeshi politician
- Altaf Husain (1900–1968), Pakistani educationist and journalist
- Altaf Hussain (East Pakistan cricketer) (1943–2019), Pakistani cricket player
- Altaf Hussain (Pakistani politician) (born 1953), Pakistani fugitive and politician
- Altaf Hussain (Welsh politician), British–Indian politician
- Altaf Khanani (born 1961), Pakistani fraudster and money launderer
- Altaf Mahmud (1933–1971), Bangladeshi freedom fighter
- Altaf Mazid (1957–2016), Indian filmmaker
- Altaf Hussain Mazumdar, Indian politician
- Altaff Mungrue (1934–2015), Trinidadian-born English first-class cricketer
- Altaf Qadri (born 1976), Indian photojournalist
- Altaf Hassan Qureshi (1932–2026), Pakistani Urdu journalist, political analyst, and author
- Altaf Raja (born 1967), Indian singer
- Altaf M. Saleem, Pakistani businessman
- Altaf Ahmad Shah (1956–2022), Kashmiri separatist
- Altaf Shakoor (born 1959), Pakistani politician
- Altaf Hossain Sikdar, Bangladeshi politician
- Altaf Tyrewala (born 1977), Indian author and columnist
- Altaf Hussain Unar (1952–2014), Pakistani politician
- Altaf Wani, Indian–American radiologist
- Altaf Ahmad Wani (born 1972), Indian politician

== Surname ==
- Chaudhry Farrukh Altaf, Pakistani politician
- Hina Altaf (born 1992), Pakistani television actress, presenter and video jockey
- Makhdoom Altaf Ahmed (1944–1995), Pakistani politician
- Malik Jamshed Altaf (born 1962), Pakistani politician
- Navjot Altaf (born 1949), Indian artist
- Qazi Altaf Hussain (1920–1999), Indian soldier
- Saad Altaf (born 1983), Pakistani cricket player
- Saleem Altaf (born 1944), Pakistani cricket player
- Selim Altaf Gorge (born 1975), Bangladesh politician
- Shahzad Altaf (born 1957), cricket player
- Syed Altaf Hossain (1923–1992), Bangladeshi politician
- Syed Mohid Altaf (born 1978), Indian politician
- Tariq Altaf (1946–2001), Pakistani diplomat
- Zafar Altaf (1941–2015), Pakistani cricket player
