= Mansoor Ijaz =

American businessman (born 1961)

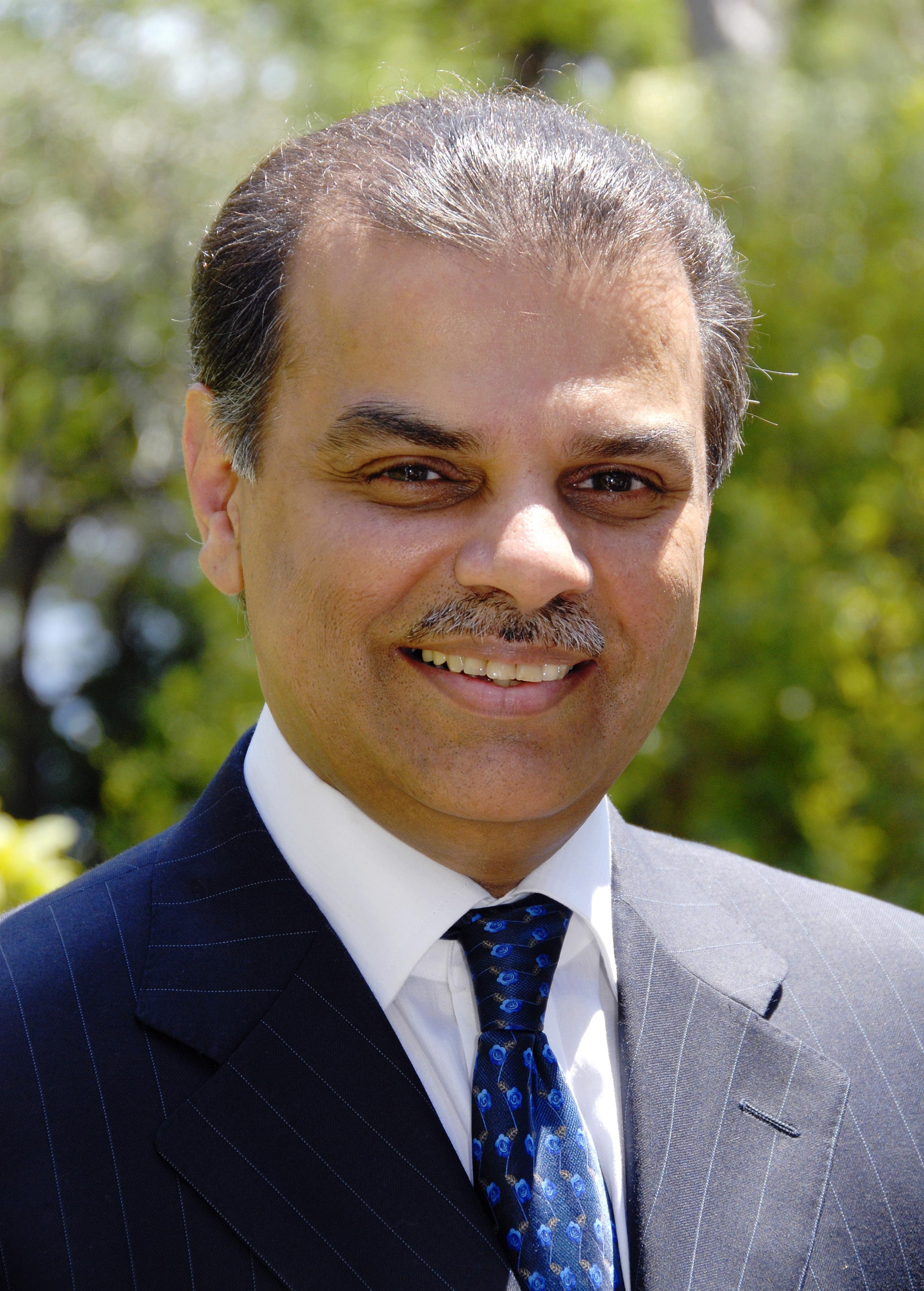
- Mansoor Ijaz in Monaco, 7 July 2007
- Born: Musawer Mansoor Ijaz; August 1961 (age 65); Tallahassee, Florida, United States
- Education: 1979–1983 University of Virginia; 1983–1985 M.I.T. 1983–1986 Harvard-MIT M.E.M.P.
- Occupations: Hedge fund management Venture capitalist News analyst and opinion writer Freelance diplomacy
- Parent(s): Mujaddid A. Ijaz (1937–1992); Lubna Razia Ijaz (1936-2017)

Mansoor Ijaz (born August 1961) is an American venture financier and hedge-fund manager. He is founder and chairman of Crescent Investment Management Ltd, a New York and London-based investment firm that operates CARAT, a proprietary trading system developed by Ijaz in the late 1980s. His venture investments included unsuccessful efforts in 2013 to acquire a stake in Lotus F1, a Formula One team. In the 1990s, Ijaz and his companies were contributors to Democratic Party institutions as well as the presidential candidacies of Bill Clinton.

During the first Clinton term, when the U.S. had severed official ties with Sudan, Ijaz opened informal communications links between Washington and Khartoum in an effort to gain access to Sudanese intelligence data on Osama bin Laden and Al-Qaeda, who were then operating from Sudan. Ijaz was involved in efforts to broker a ceasefire in Kashmir in 2000–2001, and in the Memogate controversy, in which former Pakistani envoy Husain Haqqani allegedly used him to deliver a memorandum to senior U.S. officials in order to thwart an attempted coup by the Pakistani military after bin Laden was killed.

== Personal life ==
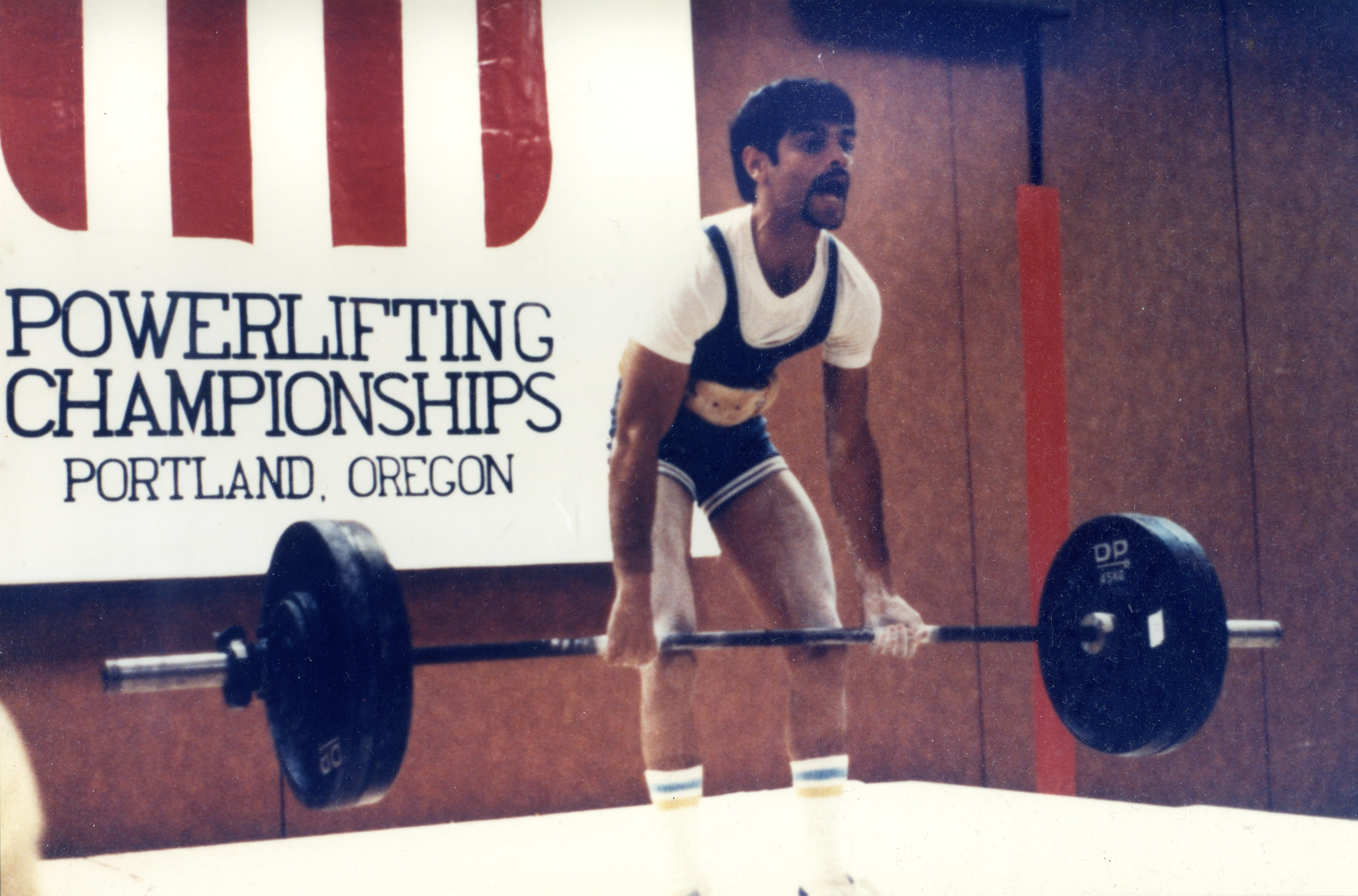
Ijaz deadlifts 418 lbs, U.S. Nationals

Mansoor Ijaz was born in Tallahassee, Florida, and grew up on a farm in Montgomery County, Virginia. He has two brothers (Atif and Mujeeb) and a sister (Neelam Ijaz-Ahmad). His brother Farouk died in 2012.

His father, Mujaddid Ahmed Ijaz (June 12, 1937— July 9, 1992), was a Pakistani experimental physicist and professor of physics at Virginia Tech who was noted for his early role in the development of Pakistan's nuclear energy program and his discovery of numerous isotopes while working at Oak Ridge National Laboratories. His mother, Lubna Razia Ijaz, was a solar physicist who worked with the United Nations Industrial Development Organization to develop renewable energy programs in Pakistan.

Ijaz received his bachelor's degree in physics from the University of Virginia in 1983 and a master's degree in mechanical engineering from the Massachusetts Institute of Technology in 1985, where he was trained as a neural sciences engineer in the Harvard-MIT Medical Engineering Medical Physics Program (M.E.M.P.).

While attending the University of Virginia, Ijaz earned All-American status as a powerlifter in March 1982 with a combined lift total (squat, bench press and deadlift) of 960 lbs at the National Collegiate Powerlifting Championships held at Marshall University. Coached by John Gamble, he competed in the 56 kg class. Later that year, he competed at the U.S. National Powerlifting Championships in the 52 kg class and finished third. Ijaz was Virginia State Champion in the 52 kg and 56 kg classes and set more than 25 Virginia State powerlifting records during three years in the sport.

== Professional life ==
=== Wall Street career ===
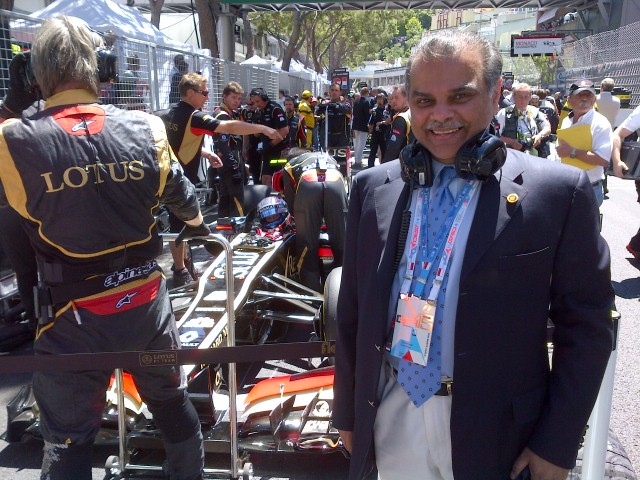
Ijaz at the Monaco Grand Prix, 2013

Mansoor Ijaz began his career on Wall Street in 1986, joining Van Eck Associates Corporation as a technology analyst. In 1990, Ijaz left Van Eck to start Crescent Investment Management LLC, where he developed a trading system, Computer-Aided Regression Analysis Techniques, to manage his first hedge fund. His mentor at Van Eck, Klaus Buescher, joined Crescent as president in 1991, and they together managed the company until Buescher's death in June 1997. Since that time, Ijaz has remained active as Crescent's owner, operating it as a quantitative investment adviser and venture investing firm.

In the early 2000s, Crescent transitioned from a traditional hedge-fund management firm to a focus on venture investments, initially in homeland security technologies after the September 11 attacks. Ijaz formed and listed Crescent Technology Ventures PLC on London's AIM Stock Exchange to raise venture capital for his projects, but changes in AIM Rules for small-cap investment companies forced the start-up to de-list a year later. In the 2000s, Ijaz also launched an effort to finance and build what would have been the world's first underwater hotel, Hydropolis. Construction of this Dubai resort was projected to cost US$500 million in 2007, but was shelved by local authorities after the 2008 financial crisis. Crescent Hydropolis Holdings LLC continues operations today under private ownership.

Crescent's venture investments included a bid together with its Abu Dhabi affiliate, Al Manhal International Group LLC, to acquire a stake in Formula One team Lotus F1. Quantum Motorsports Limited, a partnership between Crescent and Al Manhal, announced its intention to acquire 35% of Lotus F1 in June 2013. After several delays related to financing the deal, it did not take place.

=== Media commentator ===
Ijaz has also served as a media commentator and has written numerous opinion pieces for internationally known publications including The Wall Street Journal, The Washington Post, and the Los Angeles Times in the United States and the Financial Times in the United Kingdom. On television, he has served as a guest commentator for U.S. networks CNN, ABC, and Fox News, as well as for the BBC in the United Kingdom. Hired as a Fox News contributor in late 2001, Ijaz appeared as a counterterrorism and foreign affairs analyst on various network programming. By 2007, his appearances on Fox were no longer exclusive to the network. He continued to appear periodically for various networks in Pakistan, India and the U.S. into early 2012 as Pakistan's Supreme Court-appointed Judicial Commission began the Memogate inquiry.

=== Political life ===
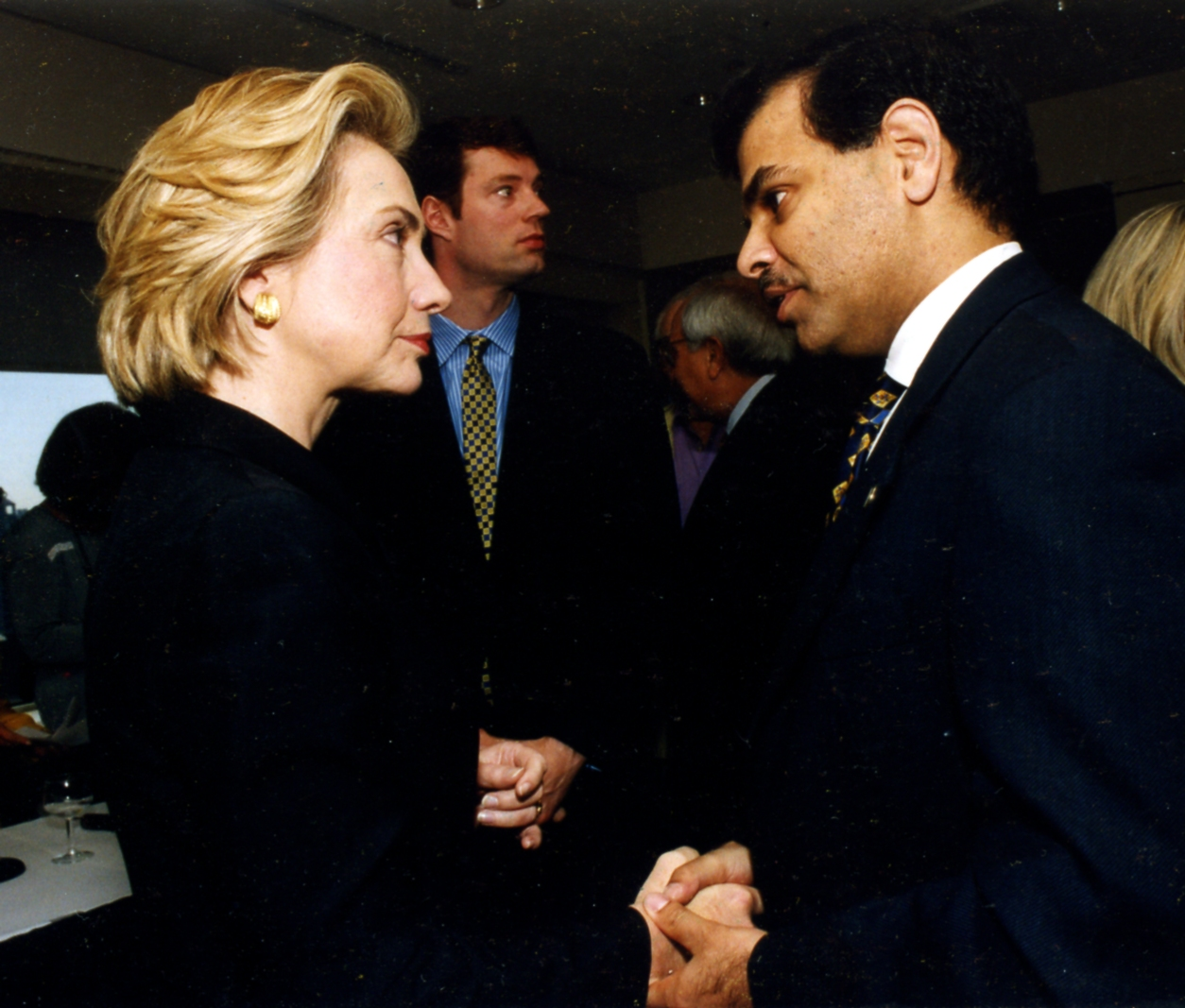
Ijaz with Hillary Clinton, July 1999

Through his opinion pieces and political fundraising, Ijaz has advocated for the integration of Muslims into the American political mainstream. He raised significant amounts for various Democratic Party causes during the 1990s when President Clinton had paved the way for minority communities to become more active in U.S. politics, encouraging fellow Pakistani and Muslim Americans to join his fundraising efforts along the way. In 1996, Ijaz raised or contributed more than $525,000 for the Clinton-Gore re-election campaign, bringing Ijaz into close proximity with Clinton, Vice President Al Gore, Hillary Clinton as well as other Clinton administration national security officials with whom he would later engage on Sudan, Kashmir and Pakistan's nuclear program.

Ijaz also used his fundraising results to advance his causes in Congress, appearing as an expert witness in front of committees in the Senate on extremist threats faced by the United States and in the House of Representatives to advocate for Washington to adopt a policy of "constructive engagement" with rogue Muslim countries affected by U.S. sanctions. As Ijaz' prominence in Democratic Party circles increased, allegations of conflicts with his business interests also surfaced, although they were never proven. In the aftermath of the September 11 attacks, Ijaz had a public falling out with senior Clinton-era officials, including the former president, Sandy Berger and Susan Rice, over what he deemed were failures in their counterterrorism policies during Clinton's two terms in office. In 2007, Nevada Republicans approached Ijaz to run against Sen. Harry Reid, in a bid to unseat the Senate Majority Leader, but Ijaz declined.

Ijaz was a member of the board of directors of the Atlantic Council from 2007 until 2009, and he is a member of the Council on Foreign Relations,

=== Philanthropic activities ===
Away from Crescent's daily affairs and former political and media engagements, Ijaz has served on the College Foundation Board of Trustees at the University of Virginia, and he serves on the advisory board of the Rebuilding Afghanistan Foundation. RAF raises funds for building education infrastructure and programs in Afghanistan, including the construction of schools such as Mayar Elementary School, which enrolled 400 boys and girls from Maidan Wardak Province upon opening in late 2005. During the mid-1990s, Ijaz supported Developments in Literacy, an initiative to build and operate elementary schools in rural Pakistan as alternatives to the religious schools in which many Pakistani children were being radicalized. The group did not seek to create a secularized school system; its goal was to teach the Qur'an as one of many subjects rather than as the only subject. Ijaz and his wife Valérie also serve as goodwill ambassadors for a British charity, Children of Peace, that works to reconcile differences between Palestinian and Israeli youth. In late 2011, while addressing the World Peace Festival, a peace conference held in Berlin, Ijaz announced an intention to donate 1% of his net worth to create a Humanitarian Relief Fund that would make an effort to alleviate the root causes of poverty. In noting his belief that governments have often failed to provide assistance to the poor in sufficient ways over the long term, Ijaz sought similar pledges for the proposed fund from other philanthropists.

== International negotiations ==
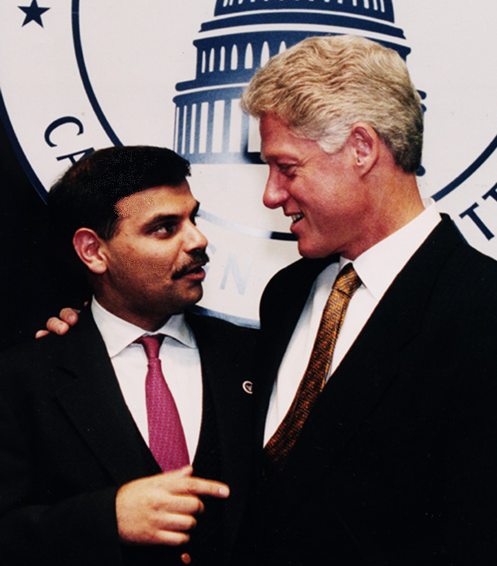
Ijaz with President Bill Clinton, June 1996

=== Negotiations with Sudan ===
Mansoor Ijaz was involved in unofficial negotiations between the U.S. and Sudanese governments in 1996 and 1997 to obtain access to Sudan's intelligence files on Osama bin Laden and the early remnants of Al-Qaeda's network there after efforts to extradite bin Laden to the U.S. failed in early 1996. In the same year, the United States Congress imposed sanctions against Khartoum over allegations of harboring and abetting terrorist cells on its soil. In early 1996, CIA and State Department officials held secret meetings near Washington, D.C., with Sudan's then-defense minister, El Fatih Erwa. In May 1996, bin Laden left Sudan for Afghanistan under pressure from the United States when the meetings failed to reconcile U.S. demands made of Khartoum about its record in aiding, abetting and harboring known terrorist groups and individuals.

Ijaz first met Sudanese president Omar al-Bashir and other Sudanese leaders in August 1996 and reported his findings back to U.S. government officials, including Lee Hamilton, ranking member of the House Committee on International Relations at the time, and Sandy Berger, then Clinton's deputy national security adviser, and Susan Rice, then director for African Affairs at the National Security Council. Initially, Khartoum sought U.S. sanctions relief, particularly for its growing oil sector, in return for access to its intelligence data on Al Qaeda's nascent network and bin Laden's activities there. However, the sanctions continued until U.S. officials exempted some in unrelated policy decisions that benefited U.S. oil companies. Ijaz then argued that Washington should adopt a policy of "constructive engagement" with Khartoum vis-a-vis economic development and political reconciliation in return for Sudanese counterterrorism cooperation.

In April 1997, Omar al-Bashir sent a letter to Hamilton, hand-carried by Ijaz from Khartoum to Washington, D.C., in which Sudan made an unconditional offer of counterterrorism assistance to the FBI and other U.S. intelligence agencies. Madeleine Albright, then newly appointed secretary of state, decided to test the Sudanese government's moderating public stance, and on September 28, 1997, she announced that certain U.S. diplomats would return to Khartoum to pursue, among other objectives, obtaining Sudan's counterterrorism data. According to former U.S. Ambassador to Sudan Tim Carney and Ijaz, Susan Rice, then newly appointed as Assistant Secretary of State for African Affairs, and counterterrorism czar Richard Clarke persuaded Berger to overrule Albright's overture to Khartoum. In early October 1997, the State Department abruptly reversed its diplomatic entendre and proceeded in early November to announce new, more comprehensive trade, economic, and financial sector sanctions against the Sudanese regime. Ijaz ended his efforts to reconcile U.S.–Sudan relations over counterterrorism issues in the summer of 1998 after the FBI declined Sudanese intelligence chief Gutbi Al-Mahdi's final unconditional offer of counterterrorism cooperation.

Capturing bin Laden had been an objective of the U.S. government from the presidency of Bill Clinton until his death in 2011. Ijaz asserted that in 1996, prior to bin Laden's expulsion from Sudan, the Sudanese government allegedly offered to arrest and extradite him to the United States. Khartoum's offer included detailed intelligence about the growing militancy of Hezbollah, Hamas, Egypt's Muslim Brotherhood and Iran's Revolutionary Guard, among other groups operating in the region. Ijaz further asserted that U.S. authorities allegedly rejected each offer despite knowing of bin Laden's involvement in training terrorists in Somalia, some of whom were allegedly involved in supporting militia members that downed U.S. Black Hawk helicopters in Mogadishu in October 1993. Any evidence of bin Laden's involvement in criminal activity against U.S. interests, such as training militia members who attacked U.S. troops in 1993, could have been grounds for indicting him far before Sudan expelled the Saudi fugitive in May 1996.

However, the 9/11 Commission found that although "former Sudanese officials claim that Sudan offered to expel bin Laden to the United States", "... we have not found any reliable evidence to support the Sudanese claim." Amb. Carney reportedly had instructions only to press the Sudanese to expel bin Laden because the U.S. government had no legal basis (i.e., no indictment outstanding) to ask the Sudanese for further action. In August 1998, two years after the warnings, the U.S. launched cruise missile strikes against Khartoum in retaliation for the East Africa embassy bombings.

=== Ceasefire negotiations in Kashmir ===
In 2000 and 2001, Ijaz was involved in efforts to broker a ceasefire in Kashmir, the cause of multiple wars between India and Pakistan since independence. He held a series of meetings with senior Indian and Pakistani government officials as well as senior Kashmiri leaders in both Indian and Pakistani-held Kashmir from November 1999 until January 2001, traveling to India secretly on out-of-passport visas. Following months of clandestine negotiations between militant Kashmiri commander Abdul Majid Dar and A. S. Dulat, then-chief of India's intelligence directorate, Dar declared a unilateral ceasefire in the Himalayan enclave on July 25, 2000. The initial ceasefire was aborted by a hard-line militant faction within Dar's Hizbul Mujahideen, widely believed to have been supported by Pakistani intelligence. In order to gain Pakistani support for India's peace efforts in Kashmir, Ijaz met Gen. Pervez Musharraf in Islamabad in May 2000. Musharraf reluctantly agreed to back the ceasefire plan despite opposition from hardliners in the ranks of Pakistan's armed forces and intelligence services.

Ijaz carried Musharraf's message to senior Indian officials, including India's then-deputy intelligence chief, C. D. Sahay. Sahay and Ijaz worked together to develop a comprehensive blueprint for participation of a wider cross-section of Kashmiri resistance groups, particularly militant groups operating from Pakistan-held Kashmir. In late summer 2000, Ijaz traveled to Muzaffarabad to negotiate with Hizbul Mujahideen commander Syed Salahuddin. That meeting resulted in Salahuddin issuing a letter to President Clinton, hand-carried to the White House by Ijaz, in which the Kashmiri leader requested Clinton's support for Salahuddin's further steps in Kashmiri ceasefire negotiations.

The plan drafted by Sahay and Ijaz reportedly became the basis of a decision by India's prime minister, Atal Bihari Vajpayee, to announce a unilateral ceasefire in Indian-held Kashmir in November 2000. To broaden support for the plan, Ijaz met with senior Indian government officials in New Delhi and leaders of Kashmiri resistance groups in Srinagar. He would later bring the two sides together for face-to-face negotiations. But Ijaz's efforts to build permanent peace ended in early 2001 when he shared his plans with Indian home minister L. K. Advani to bring Pakistan's Islamic groups on board in support of wider Indo-Pakistani peace. A resulting peace summit between India and Pakistan, held in Agra in June 2001, sought to forge an agreement on a permanent resolution to the Kashmir conflict, but Musharraf and Vajpayee ultimately failed to persuade their hardliners to allow signing of an accord.

== Memogate ==
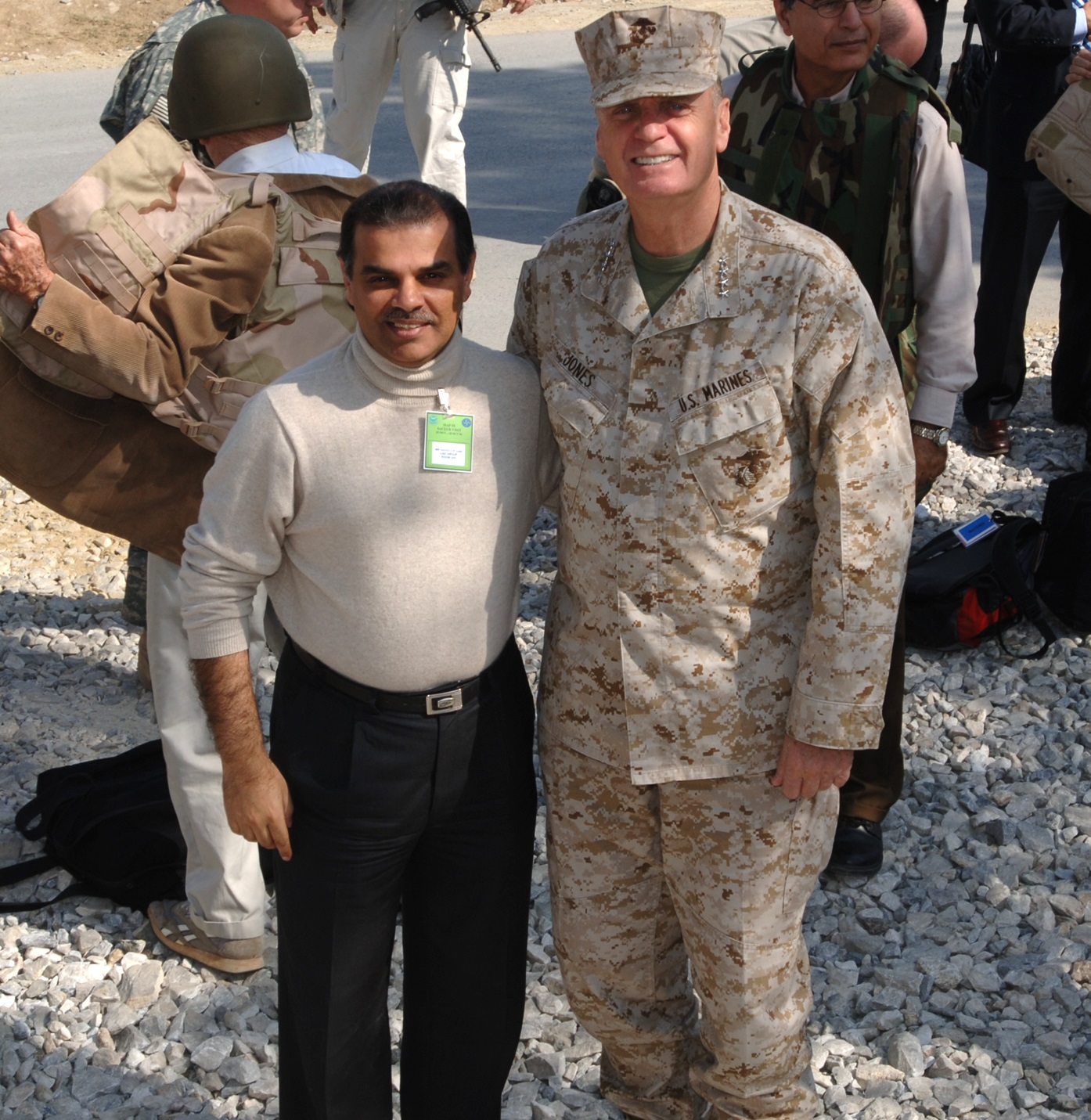
Ijaz with General James L. Jones, NATO Commander, Bagram Air Base, Oct. 2006

Mansoor Ijaz was one of the key protagonists in Pakistan's Memogate controversy. On October 10, 2011, Ijaz published an opinion piece about the interference of Pakistan's intelligence services in the function of its democratic institutions. In the opinion's prelude, Ijaz disclosed the existence of a memorandum that he had allegedly been asked to deliver to Admiral Mike Mullen, then-chairman of the Joint Chiefs of Staff, on behalf of a senior Pakistani diplomat, later identified as Pakistani envoy Husain Haqqani, in the days following the Abbottabad raid. The memorandum sought the Obama administration's help to avert a military takeover of Pakistan's civilian government in the immediate aftermath of Osama bin Laden's death. It was delivered to Mullen at Ijaz's request by former U.S. national security adviser General James L. Jones.

Then-leader of the opposition, Nawaz Sharif (who would later become Pakistan's prime minister), lodged a petition with the Supreme Court of Pakistan to investigate the origins, credibility and purpose of the memorandum. His and other petitions lodged with the Supreme Court alleged that the memorandum had been drafted by Haqqani at the behest of Pakistan's then-president, Asif Ali Zardari, and delivered without knowledge of the country's powerful armed forces and intelligence services. On December 30, 2011, after reviewing Sharif's petition, the Supreme Court constituted a Judicial Commission to conduct a broad inquiry. Ijaz was among the key witnesses deposed, as were Pakistan's intelligence chief, Ahmad Shuja Pasha and Haqqani. Pakistan's army chief Gen. Ashfaq Parvez Kayani submitted written testimony to the Supreme Court, as did then-Prime Minister Yousef Raza Gilani on behalf of the Zardari government.

After nearly six months of investigations, the Judicial Commission reported its findings on June 12, 2012. It found that the memorandum was authentic and that Haqqani was its "originator and architect". The report said the former ambassador "orchestrated the possibility of an imminent coup to both persuade Mr. Ijaz to convey the message and also to give it (Memorandum) traction and credibility". The justices found further that one of Haqqani's purposes was to head a new national security team in Pakistan. In an unexpected turn of the investigation, a secret fund was discovered in Pakistan's Washington embassy that Haqqani allegedly had access to and had allegedly utilized, in "apparent violation of Article 84 of the Constitution of Pakistan". The commission's report exonerated President Zardari from any prior knowledge of the memorandum, although it noted that in the "considered view" of the justices, Haqqani had led Ijaz to believe the memorandum had the Pakistani president's approval. Following testimony by Ijaz, the commission deemed him a reliable witness whose credibility Haqqani had unsuccessfully sought to undermine.

The Supreme Court, upon hearing the commission's report in session, ordered Haqqani to appear before the bench. The former envoy, however, continued to reject the commission's findings while maintaining his innocence. As of July 2014, he remained in the United States.
