= Ahmad Shuja Pasha =

Pakistani general and intelligence chief (born 1952)

Lieutenant General Ahmad Shuja Pasha HI(M)
- احمد شجاع پاشا
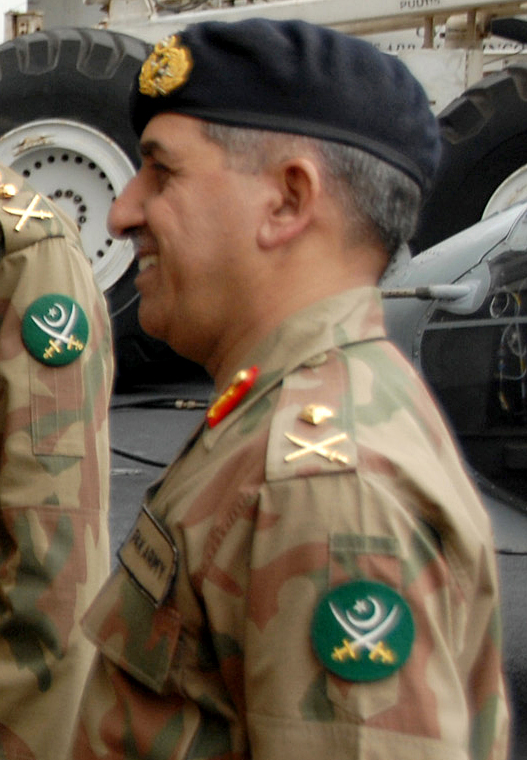
- Pasha in 2008

24th Director-General Inter-Services Intelligence
- In office October 2008 – March 2012
- Preceded by: Nadeem Taj
- Succeeded by: Zaheerul Islam

Director General of Military Operations GHQ (Pakistan)
- In office April 2006 – October 2008

Commandant Command and Staff College Quetta
- In office April 2005 – April 2006

General Officer Commanding 8th Infantry Division, Sialkot
- In office January 2003 – April 2005

Contingent and Sector Commander United Nations Mission in Sierra Leone
- In office 2001–2002

Personal details
- Born: 18 March 1952 (age 74) Sialkot, Punjab, Pakistan

Military service
- Branch/service: Pakistan Army
- Years of service: 1974–2012
- Rank: Lieutenant General
- Unit: Frontier Force Regiment
- Commands: 8th Infantry Division Sialkot; Command and Staff College Quetta; DG Military Operations; United Nations Mission in Sierra Leone
- Battles/wars: Sierra Leone Civil War; War in North-West Pakistan
- Awards: Hilal-e-Imtiaz

Ahmad Shuja Pasha (Note: Urdu: احمد شجاع پاشا) (born 18 March 1952) is a retired three-star rank army general of the Pakistan Army. He was the 24th Director-General of the Inter-Services Intelligence (ISI), the main intelligence agency of Pakistan, from October 2008 until March 2012. He was due to reach the age of superannuation on 18 March 2011 but received an extension of one year, and retired in March 2012. Pasha was succeeded by Lieutenant General Zaheerul Islam. In 2011, Pasha was named as one of the world's 100 most influential people by Time magazine.

General Ahmad Shuja Pasha, emerged as fiercely hostile to Washington in his final year engaging in "shouting matches" with then CIA Director Leon Panetta, cutting cooperation down to a minimum and ordering the harassment of U.S. diplomats in Pakistan.

== Early life ==
Born into a family that moved from Indian Punjab following the Partition of British India in 1947, his father, a high school teacher, shifted the family to a village close to Islamabad, Pasha being the youngest boy, with three sisters and three brothers, two of them joining the Pakistan Army while a brother opted for the Pakistan Air Force.

== Military career ==
Pasha joined the 49th Long Course at Pakistan Military Academy, Kakul in 1972. He was commissioned as a second lieutenant in the Frontier Force Regiment, in 1974. He was also selected for advanced military education abroad, enrolling at the Bundeswehr Command and Staff College in Hamburg, learning German.

He has commanded an infantry battalion, a mechanized infantry brigade and has served as the Chief Instructor of the Command and Staff College Quetta.

From 2001 to 2002, Brigadier Pasha served as a contingent and sector commander of the United Nations Mission in Sierra Leone.

Pasha was promoted to the rank of Major General on 5 January 2003, and was posted as GOC 8th Infantry Division in Sialkot. In April 2005, he was appointed the commandant of the Command and Staff College Quetta. From April 2006 to October 2008, Pasha served as the Director General at the Military Operations directorate at the Army headquarters overseeing all military engagements in Waziristan, Swat and other tribal areas.

In October 2007, he was selected as the military adviser to the secretary-general of United Nations. However, due to his commitments as DGMO he did not join the United Nations.

== DG-ISI (2008–2012) ==
The newly elected civilian government of Prime Minister Yousaf Raza Gillani tried for two months to gain control of the appointment for the director of the ISI as well as place the agency under the administrative, financial, and operational control of the Interior Ministry. However, the attempt failed when the Chief of Army Staff General Kayani appointed Pasha on 29 September 2008. Pasha's prior post was responsible for planning operations against Taliban and Al-Qaeda militants in the FATA and Khyber Pakhtunkhwa provinces of Pakistan, signalling a reorientation from the ISI's traditional Kashmir and India focus. The United States government had pressured Pakistan to replace Lieutenant-General Nadeem Taj, the then incumbent chief of the ISI, whom they claimed to have been "double dealing" with militants with a more acceptable candidate like Pasha. Additionally, Pasha's appointment was part of a wider Chief of Army Staff reappointment shake-up that solidified General Kayani's loyalty among the military as all prior appointees were done by former President and Chief of the Army Pervez Musharraf.

Pasha retired on 18 March 2012 and was succeeded by Lt. General Zaheerul Islam.

=== 2008 Mumbai attacks ===
In the wake of the 2008 Mumbai attacks, the Indian media reported that President Asif Ali Zardari had instructed Pasha to go to India to share intelligence after a request from Indian Prime Minister Manmohan Singh, which would have constituted the first time a head of the ISI travelling to help the investigation of a terrorist attack. Under pressure from the Pakistan military, the decision was however reversed within a few hours.

In September 2009, he made another public outreach towards India by attending an Iftar party hosted by the then Indian High Commissioner to Pakistan.

=== Memorandum affair ===
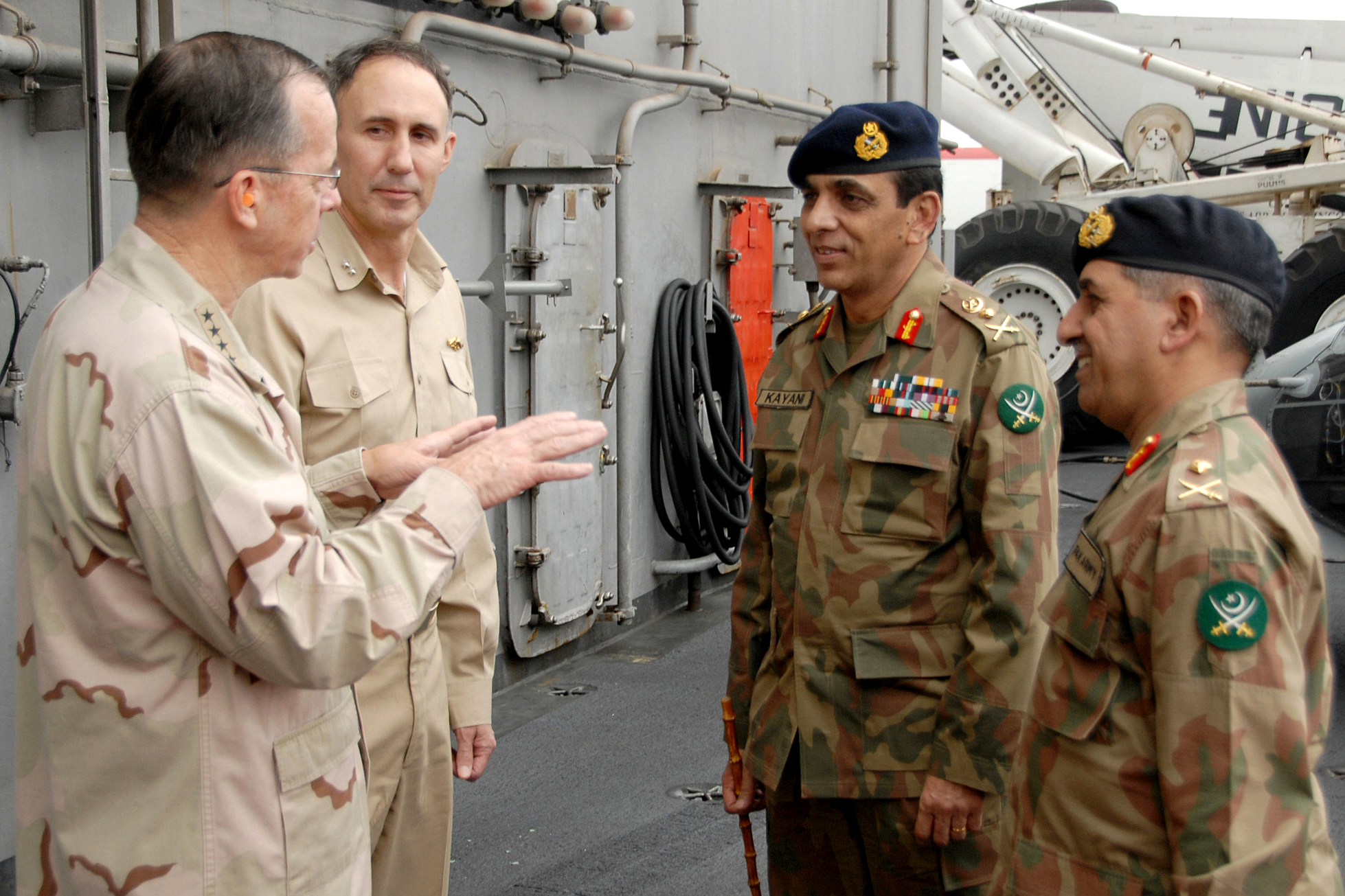
Maj. General Pasha (right) next to General Ashfaq Kayani on the USS Abraham Lincoln talking with Michael Mullen, chairman of the Joint Chiefs of Staff

Lt. General Pasha was involved in the Memogate controversy of 2011–2012, in which an American businessman, Mansoor Ijaz alleged that a senior Pakistani diplomat, former ambassador Husain Haqqani, had asked him to deliver an unsigned memorandum to Admiral Michael Mullen, chairman of the US Joint Chiefs of Staff at the time. The memorandum sought help from the Obama administration in the wake of the Abbottabad raid during which U.S. Special Forces killed Osama bin Laden. It asked the United States to help avert a military takeover of the civilian government in Pakistan, as well as assistance in executing a Washington insider takeover of the government and military apparatus of Pakistan.

On 10 October 2011, the London Financial Times published an article in which the existence of the memorandum was disclosed, arguing that Pakistan's intelligence services were responsible for fuelling jihadist insurgency in the country. On 22 October 2011, Pasha met Ijaz at the London InterContinental hotel. The meeting lasted four hours, and started a chain of events that ended in a Supreme Court investigation of the memorandum's origins, authenticity and purpose.

During the London meeting, Pasha was presented with evidence in the form of BlackBerry handset exchanges, written notes and call logs that pointed to the involvement of the senior Pakistani diplomat in the matter. Haqqani continues to deny any involvement with the memorandum.

On 5 April 2012, Pasha agreed to appear before the Judicial Commission constituted by the Supreme Court of Pakistan to examine the available evidence in the memorandum affair. He testified that during the meeting in London, he was shown the same evidence as had appeared during the course of the previous three months of hearings and that he believed the evidence to be factual and authentic. He did not waver in his stance about the purpose, origin or authenticity of the memorandum.

In June 2012, the Judicial Commission released its final conclusions and found that the alleged memorandum was authentic and that former ambassador Husain Haqqani was its "originator and architect". The report said he had in fact sought American support through the memo and wanted to head a new national security team in Pakistan. The report also stated that Haqqani was not loyal to Pakistan as he had left the country, had no material assets in Pakistan and was now living abroad. The Supreme Court, upon hearing the report in session, ordered the former ambassador to appear before the bench. The process of repatriating Haqqani to Pakistan for his appearance in front of the high court continues to the present day.

== Views ==
=== Anti-Western sentiments ===
Journalist Steve Coll considers that Pasha shows anti-Western ideas, refusing to send his children abroad for education unlike most of the elite in Pakistan and being generally skeptical of the Western geopolitics, telling to a journalist that "your problem (...) is that you’re an elitist, whereas I began my life as a son of a schoolteacher. I sat on a mat on the floor and learned to read and write ... we are homespun. We are nationalists. We are not like your Sandhurst friends. Not like Musharraf."

== Notes ==
Military offices
Preceded by Nadeem Taj	Director General of the Inter-Services Intelligence; 28 September 2008 – 18 March 2012	Succeeded by Zaheerul Islam
