= Sherry Rehman =

Pakistani politician

Sherry Rehman NI
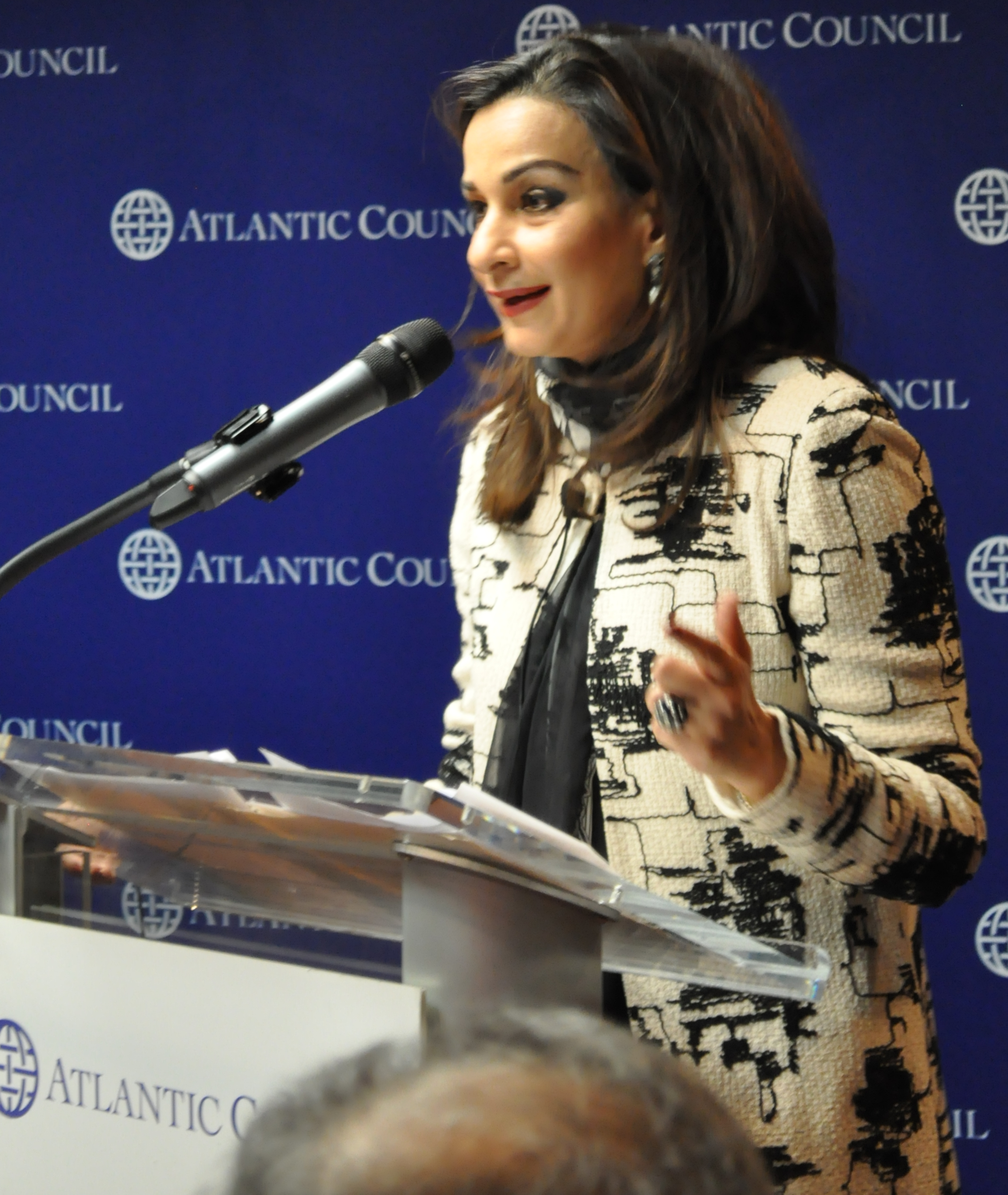
- Rehman in 2013

Federal Minister of Climate Change
- In office 19 April 2022 – 10 August 2023
- Prime Minister: Shehbaz Sharif
- Preceded by: Malik Amin Aslam

Leader of the Opposition in the Senate of Pakistan
- In office 22 March 2018 – 26 August 2018
- Preceded by: Aitzaz Ahsan
- Succeeded by: Raja Zafar-ul-Haq

Senate of Pakistan
- Incumbent
- Assumed office 8 June 2015
- Constituency: General seat from Sindh

Pakistan Ambassador to the United States
- In office 23 November 2011 – 14 October 2013
- President: Asif Ali Zardari
- Prime Minister: Yusuf Raza Gillani
- Preceded by: Husain Haqqani
- Succeeded by: Jalil Abbas Jilani

Federal Minister for Information and Broadcasting
- In office 31 March 2008 – 14 March 2009
- President: Pervez Musharraf; Asif Ali Zardari
- Prime Minister: Yusuf Raza Gillani
- Preceded by: Nisar Memon
- Succeeded by: Qamar Zaman Kaira

Federal Minister for Women Development
- In office 15 May 2008 – 3 November 2008
- President: Pervez Musharraf; Asif Ali Zardari
- Prime Minister: Yusuf Raza Gillani
- Preceded by: Nazar Muhammad Gondal
- Succeeded by: Aijaz Hussain Jakhrani

Federal Minister for Culture
- In office 24 May 2008 – 12 August 2008
- President: Pervez Musharraf; Asif Ali Zardari
- Prime Minister: Yusuf Raza Gillani
- Preceded by: Khawaja Saad Rafique

Member of the National Assembly of Pakistan
- In office 17 March 2008 – 23 November 2011
- Constituency: Reserved seat for women
- In office 2002–2007
- Constituency: Reserved seat for women

Personal details
- Born: Shehrbano Rahman; 21 December 1960 (age 65) Karachi, Sindh, Pakistan
- Party: PPP (2002–present)
- Spouse: Nadeem Hussain
- Education: Smith College; University of Sussex
- Awards: Nishan-e-Imtiaz (2013)
- Website: www.sherryrehman.com

Shehrbano "Sherry" Rehman (Urdu: شیری رحمان; born 21 December 1960) is a Pakistani politician and journalist who has been the member of the Senate of Pakistan since 2015. She was the first female Leader of the Opposition in the Senate from March to August 2018 and served as Pakistan's Ambassador to the United States from 2011 to 2013.

Born in Karachi, Rehman received her B.A. from Smith College and her M.A. in art history from the University of Sussex. In 1988, she joined the Herald as its editor and remained with the magazine until 1999. In 2002, she was elected to the National Assembly of Pakistan. She was re-elected in 2008, and became a member of the Federal Cabinet under Prime Minister Gillani as the Minister for Information.

She resigned from the cabinet in 2009 and went on to serve as the Chair of the Pakistan Red Crescent and founded the non-partisan think tank, Jinnah Institute. In November 2011, she was appointed as the Ambassador to the United States and remained until April 2013. In 2015, she was elected to the Senate.

== Early life and education ==
Sherbano Rehman was born on 21 December 1960 in Karachi, Sindh, to Hassanally A. Rahman, belonging to a Sindhi family. Her mother served as first vice president of the State Bank of Pakistan. Rehman attended the Karachi Grammar School receiving her A level from there, she moved to the United States where she studied at the Smith College in Northampton, Massachusetts, where she received her B.A. in political science in 1985. She moved to the United Kingdom, where she received an M.A. in art history from the University of Sussex. She serves as the chairperson of the Jinnah Institute, a research organisation.

== Professional career ==
Rehman started her professional career as a journalist with The Daily Star and then joined The Herald and became its editor-in-chief at the age of 26, serving until 1998. After leaving the Herald in 1998, she co-authored the book The Kashmiri Shawl: From Jamawar to Paisley. She worked as a professional journalist for 20 years and served as a member of the Council of Pakistan Newspaper Editors from 1988 to 1998. Rehman hosted a television current affairs show in 1999. She has also worked for the Pakistan Red Crescent Society as chairperson.

== Political career ==
She was elected to the National Assembly of Pakistan for the first time as a candidate for PPP on reserved seat for women in the 2002 Pakistani general election where she remained until 2007. During her tenure as Member of the National Assembly, she remained Central Information Secretary of PPP, President of Policy Planning for the PPP and remained a part of the party's Foreign Relations Committee.

Rehman was re-elected to the National Assembly as a candidate for PPP on the reserved seat for women from Sindh in the 2008 Pakistani general election. During her second tenure as Member of the National Assembly, she authored several legislations which were tabled in the National Assembly.

In March 2008, she was inducted into the federal cabinet of Prime Minister Yousaf Raza Gillani and was appointed as the Minister for Information and Broadcasting. She was given the additional ministerial portfolio of Health in April 2008, Women Development and Culture in May 2008. She remained Minister for Culture until August 2008. In November 2008, she relinquished portfolios of Health and Women Development.

Rehman resigned her post as Information Minister in March 2009 in protest over government attempt to put restrictions on the freedom of the press.

In 2010, she tabled a bill seeking to abolish the death penalty for blasphemy, as a result she was placed under police surveillance after receiving death threats. Rehman was accused of committing "blasphemy, a crime that carries the death penalty" in Pakistan" in connection with a 2010 TV talk show." Her accusers went to the Pakistan "Supreme Court with his complaint after police refused to register it. The court ordered police in the central Pakistani city of Multan to investigate."

In November 2011, Rehman was named Pakistan's Ambassador to United States following the resignation of Hussain Haqqani, who was asked to resign by Prime Minister Gilani in the wake of the "Memogate" scandal. While ambassador, she called on the United States to end its drone strikes in Pakistan. She left the post in May 2013.

In June 2015, she was elected to the Senate of Pakistan for the first time as a candidate of PPP on general seat from Sindh and replaced Abdul Latif Ansari.

In March 2018, she was elected as the Leader of the Opposition in the Senate and became the first female in Pakistan to hold the office. She served as the Leader of the Opposition in the Senate till August 2018.

In 2020, she created controversy when she clapped back at PTI Senator Mohsin Aziz for his comments, "Mera Jism Meri Marzi, MeToo and apna khana khud garam kero." She argued that parliament should not play the culture and religious card when talking about women's rights.

As of 2020, she was the chairperson on the Senate committee on the China-Pakistan Economic Corridor (CPEC).

In 2022 she spoke to international media about major floods. During the 2022 United Nations Climate Change Conference in Sharm El Sheikh, Egypt, she pushed for an agreement on loss and damage, for the rich nations to compensate the poor countries for the damage they have caused, holding the Pakistani floods that year as a prime example of the damage being done by climate change. After an agreement was reached, she said that it "provides hope to vulnerable communities all over the world who are fighting for survival from climate stress, and gives some credibility to the COP process."

== Personal life ==
Sherry Rehman is married to Nadeem Hussain, who is known for founding Tameer Microfinance Bank. Her daughter Marvi Malik died at age 35 in March 2026 following a brain hemorrhage.

== Awards and recognition ==
- 2002: Independent Journalism Award by the UK House of Lords in its Muslim World Awards Ceremony.
- 2006: R.L Shep Ethnic Textiles Book Award for The Kashmiri Shawl
- 2008: International Peace Award for Democrats by the Human Rights Commission.
- 2009: The Freedom Award Pakistan by the Association of Television Journalists.
- 2009: International Republican Institute's "Democracy's Hero"
- 2009: 100 Most Influential Asians by UAE magazine Ahlan
- 2011: Jeane J. Kirkpatrick Award by The Women's Democracy Network, Washington
- 2012: Smith College Medal
- 2013: Nishan-e-Imtiaz

== Publications ==
=== Author ===
- The Kashmiri Shawl: From Jamavar to Paisley, Antique Collectors' Club, 2006. Co-authored with Naheed Jafri.
- CPEC 2.0: The Promise and The Peril, Jinnah Institute, 2009.
- Corridors of Knowledge for Peace and Development, Sang-e-Meel Publications, 2019. Contributed with the Chapter 4, "The Connectivity Dream".

=== Editor ===
- Womansplaining: Navigating Activism, Politics and Modernity in Pakistan, Folio Books and Jinnah Institute, 2021.

Political offices
Preceded by Nisar Memon	Minister for Information and Broadcasting; 2008–2009	Succeeded by Qamar Zaman Kaira
Diplomatic posts
Preceded by Husain Haqqani	Pakistan Ambassador to the United States; 2011–2013	Succeeded by Jalil Abbas Jilani
