= Hydropolis =

Hydropolis may refer to:

- Hydropolis, Wrocław, a science center in Wrocław, Poland
- Hydropolis, Dubai, a proposed underwater hotel in Dubai, United Arab Emirates
