= Altaf M. Saleem =

Pakistani businessman

Mian Altaf M. Saleem is a Pakistani businessman who is the founder of Shakarganj Limited and its philanthropic arm Shakarganj Foundation. Previously, he has served as the Chairman of Sui Northern Gas Pipelines Limited and as a Federal Minister for Privatisation from 1999 to 2002.

== Career ==
In June 2005, he was made Chairman of the Sui Northern Gas Pipelines Limited.

In 2006, the President of Pakistan conferred him with the Sitara-i-Eisaar in recognition of his humanitarian services.
