= Zaheer-ul-Islam =

Pakistan Army general

Lieutenant-General Zaheer-ul-Islam HI (M)
- ﻇﻬﻴﺮﺍﻹﺳﻼﻡ
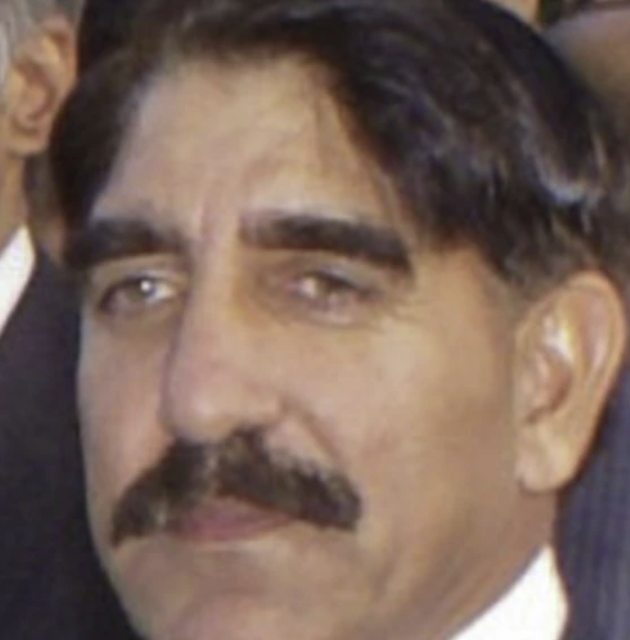

25th Director General of the ISI
- In office 19 March 2012 – 7 November 2014
- Prime Minister: Yousaf Raza Gillani; Raja Pervaiz Ashraf; Nawaz Sharif
- Preceded by: Ahmad Shuja Pasha
- Succeeded by: Rizwan Akhtar

Commander V Corps
- In office October 2010 – March 2012

Director General CT-Wing of the ISI
- In office 2008–2010

GOC 12th Infantry Division
- In office 2006–2008

Chief of Staff Army Strategic Forces Command
- In office 2004–2006

Personal details
- Born: 1956 (age 69–70) Rawalpindi, Pakistan
- Relatives: Shah Nawaz Khan (uncle); Shah Rukh Khan (cousin)
- Awards: Hilal-e-Imtiaz (Military) (Crescent of Excellence)

Military service
- Allegiance: Pakistan
- Branch/service: Pakistan Army
- Years of service: 1974 –2014
- Rank: Lieutenant General
- Unit: Punjab Regiment
- Commands: DG ISI; Commander V Corps

Raja Zaheer-ul-Islam HI (M), (Urdu: راجہ ظہیر الاسلام) is a retired lieutenant-general of the Pakistan Army who served as the 25th Director General of the ISI.

He was appointed to the position on 9 March 2012 and began working a day after his predecessor Ahmed Shuja Pasha left on 18 March 2012.

At the time of his appointment, he was serving as the Corps Commander V Corps, headquartered in Karachi, Pakistan. In 2012, Forbes named him as the world's 52nd most powerful person.

== Early and personal life ==
He was born into a Janjua Rajput family in Rawalpindi. His father retired as a brigadier in the Pakistan Army, while his three brothers and his brother-in-law Major Ejaz Aziz also retired as military officers.

His uncle was Shah Nawaz Khan, a major general in the Indian National Army of Subhas Chandra Bose.

In 2012, it was alleged that Islam is related to Indian film actor Shah Rukh Khan. The Pakistan Army denied the allegations and said since Lateef Fatima, the mother of Khan, is the adopted daughter of Shah Nawaz Khan, Lateef and her son have no blood relation to Zaheer-ul-Islam. However, in an interview, Shah Rukh Khan clarified that it was his father who was a cousin of Shah Nawaz Khan.

== Military career ==
Zaheerul Islam was commissioned in the Punjab Regiment in the 55th PMA Long Course on 16 April 1977. He served as Corps Commander of the V Corps, headquartered in Karachi, Pakistan.

Zaheer served as the Director-General of the Counter-Terrorism Wing of the ISI before he was promoted to a lieutenant general and moved to Karachi as the Commander of the V Corps. He was the GOC of the 12th Division for some time before coming to the ISI. He also served as Chief of Staff Army Strategic Forces Command from 2004 to 2006. From 2008 to 2010, he served as Deputy ISI Director.

== Political career ==
Zaheer-ul-Islam became politically active in June 2022 when he publicly showed support for the Pakistan Tehreek-e-Insaf. Previously, in 2020, the former Prime Minister of Pakistan Nawaz Sharif accused Zaheer-ul-Islam of seeking his resignation during the 2014 Azadi march. Zaheer-ul-Islam denied the allegations. In 2015, there were allegations that Ahmad Shuja Pasha, his predecessor at ISI and Zaheer-ul-Islam were conspiring to create a rift between Prime Minister Nawaz Sharif and Chief of Army Staff General Raheel Sharif. But the actual events that followed in Pakistan in 2015, did not show that they had succeeded in their alleged efforts.

A major newspaper of Pakistan reportedly stated:

"Quite like most of his career in the intelligence, he has refused to come out of the shadows to clarify his position".

Military offices
Preceded by Ahmad Shuja Pasha	Director General of the Inter-Services Intelligence; 18 March 2012 – October 2014	Succeeded by Rizwan Akhtar
