= Altaf Qadri =

Indian photojournalist

- Born: 1976 (age 49–50); Srinagar, Jammu and Kashmir
- Occupation: Photojournalist
- Known for: Conflict and human interest photography
- Website: www.altafqadri.com

Altaf Qadri is a Kashmiri photojournalist presently working with the Associated Press.

== Life and work ==
Qadri was born in Srinagar, the summer capital of Indian-administered Kashmir. He had his first freelance assignment in 2001, and was then a staff photographer for a local newspaper. In 2003, he joined the European Pressphoto Agency, for which he provided extensive coverage of the Kashmir conflict before joining the Associated Press in 2008.

== Awards ==
- Second prize in the International News Pictures Story Category in the 'Best of Photojournalism 2005" by National Press Photographers Association (NPPA)
- His picture of Kashmir village children playing cricket won the First prize in Sports Action and Feature category in the India Press Photo 2006 competition by The Indian Express' Ramnath Goenka Foundation.
- 2007: Special Jury Prize (with seven others), Days Japan International Photojournalism Awards, for a picture story about the conflict in Kashmir, Kashmir: Paradise in Pain.
- First Prize in "One Weeks Work" category by Pictures of the Year International (POYi) 2007
- Winner of the All Roads Photography Program of the National Geographic Society for 2007
- Awarded the Paola Biocca International Reportage Award 2008 by the International Journalism Festival, Italy
- Winner of first place in General News Story category in India Press Photo Contest 2008 by The Indian Express Ramnath Goenka Foundation
- Best Published Picture Story category in 2008, by the National Press Photographers Association
- Third place in the feature photography by National Headliner Awards, 2010
- First place in Portrait/Personality category, 2014 Atlanta Photojournalism Seminar Contest
- Finalist in the World Understanding Award category by Pictures of Year (POYi), 2011
- Award of Excellence in General News category by the Pictures of Year (POYi), 2011
- Second place in General News category by Media Federation of India, 2011
- First place in People in the News category, 2011 World Press Photo competition, 2012
- Third place in General News category, 2012 Atlanta Photojournalism Seminar Contest
