= Memogate (Pakistan) =

2011 controversy about a Pakistani memo seeking the help of the US Government

The memogate controversy (also Mullen memo controversy) revolves around a memorandum (addressed to Admiral Mike Mullen) ostensibly seeking help of the Obama administration in the wake of the Osama bin Laden raid to avert a military takeover of the civilian government in Pakistan, as well as assisting in a civilian takeover of the government and military apparatus. The memo was delivered in May 2011; Mansoor Ijaz wrote a Financial Times article in October 2011 bringing initial public attention to the affair. The memo, which at first was questioned to even exist, was published in November, leading to the resignation of Ambassador Haqqani and the continuing Pakistani Supreme Court investigation.

Central actors in the plot include Pakistani-American businessman Mansoor Ijaz, who alleged that long-time friend and former Pakistan Ambassador to the United States Husain Haqqani asked him to deliver a confidential memo asking for US assistance. The memo is alleged to have been drafted by Haqqani at the behest of President of Pakistan Asif Ali Zardari. The memo was delivered to Mike Mullen through then National Security Advisor James L. Jones.

The Supreme Court of Pakistan has opened a broader inquiry into the origins, credibility and purpose of the memo. On 19 April 2012 a petition was submitted in the Supreme Court to arrest former Pakistan ambassador to US Husain Haqqani through Interpol for his refusal to return to Pakistan. On 12 June the supreme court commission released its findings and found that after testimony by all parties and verifying the forensic results of Ijaz's BlackBerry conversations with Haqqani it was "incontrovertibly established" that Husain Haqqani had written the memo and was being called back to Pakistan to face likely charges of treason.

== Background and timeline ==
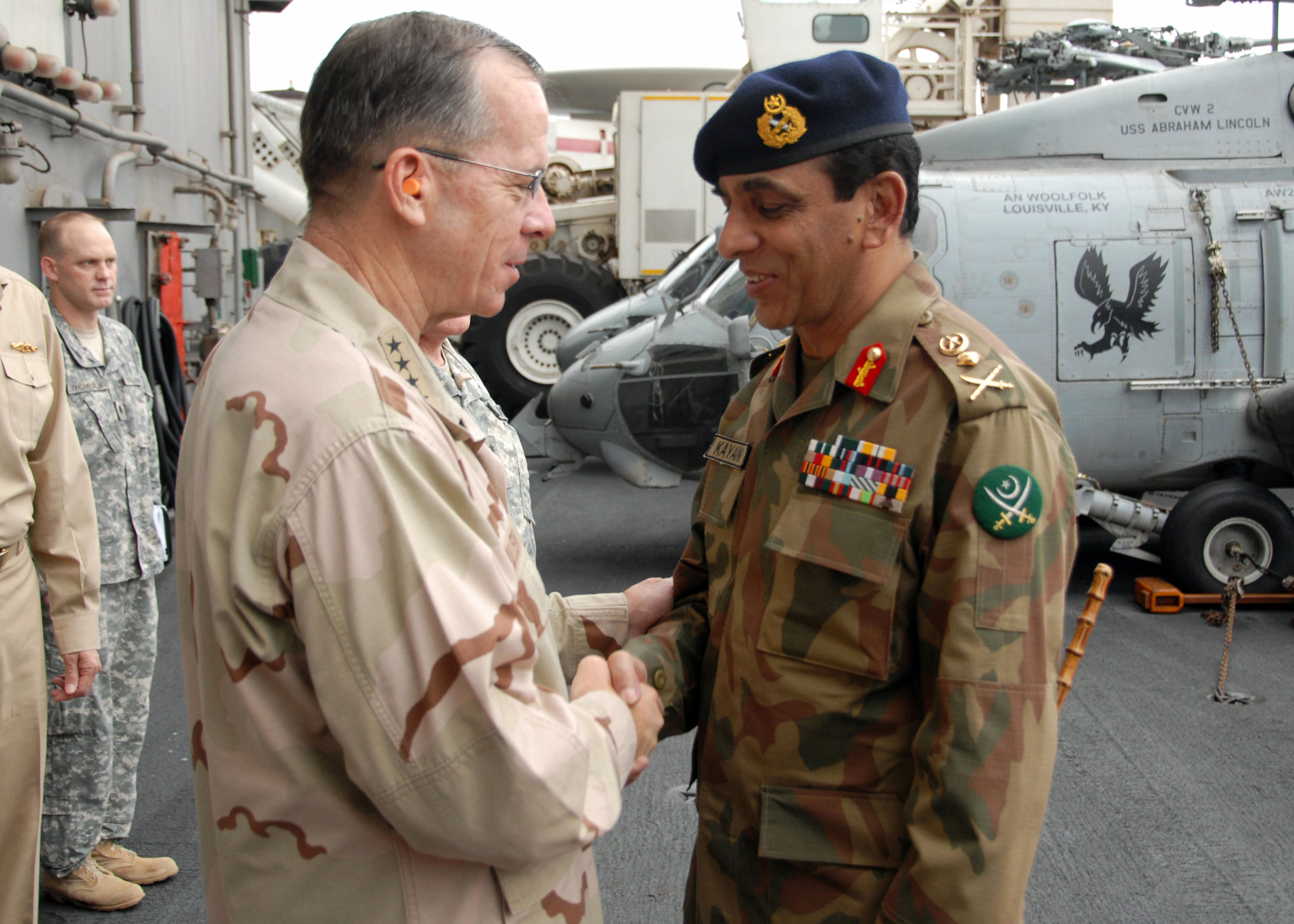
Admiral Mike Mullen greets Pakistani COAS, General Ashfaq Kayani (27 August 2008).

The US-Pakistan relationship was seemingly at an all-time low before the assault on Osama bin Laden's compound in Abbottabad on 2 May 2011. Civilians and the media blamed the Pakistani armed forces for being unable to locate bin Laden's whereabouts and further criticised them for letting the United States conduct a unilateral operation on Pakistani soil, thereby prompting a furore over violation of Pakistani sovereignty by the United States.

The raid on Bin Laden put the civilian government and military officials at loggerheads. A meeting of the president, prime minister and the chief of army staff was called to discuss the issue in detail. The memorandum in question was allegedly written less than two days after the meeting was called, and a few days after the raid on the bin Laden compound.

The memo presented concerns that Pakistani military outfits might attempt to overthrow the civilian government in the wake of the Bin Laden raid. To counteract these concerns the memo asks for US military and political help in wresting control of the government away from the military in what amounted to a counter-coup. It then goes on to make other offers favourable to the United States including: setting up tribunals with investigators picked by Washington to put the leaders of the military on trial, the creation of a new security apparatus consisting of the authors of the memo and others favourable to Washington, and "carte blanche" for the US military in conducting strikes within Pakistan.

=== Drafting the memo ===
According to messages leaked online from Mansoor Ijaz, Ambassador Husain Haqqani sent him a BlackBerry message on 9 May 2011, asking him to return a call to London, where the ambassador was residing at the Park Lane Intercontinental Hotel. The message further asked him to deliver a prompt proposal, initially verbally, for assistance to Admiral Mike Mullen. Ijaz, whose BlackBerry exchanges with Haqqani indicate he was in Monaco at the time, claims Haqqani then dictated the contents of what was to be relayed verbally in that first telephone call, lasting approximately 20 minutes, according to Ijaz's telephone records. Ijaz has further stated that his US interlocutors each insisted on a written memorandum because of consistent problems in the recent past with Pakistani officials making verbal offers that later, were not honoured. Ijaz then drafted, on the basis of Haqqani's instructions, the memorandum in question and confirmed the contents by telephone and over numerous BlackBerry Messenger conversations with the Pakistani ambassador.

The following morning, Ijaz emailed a copy of the memo draft to the ambassador for proofreading and asked for assurances that the memo had the approval of the president of Pakistan. Shortly after a meeting with British delegates at 10 Downing Street, Haqqani read the proof for the final proposal and asked for it to be delivered immediately to Mullen through a US interlocutor, later named as National Security Advisor James L. Jones, former NATO commander and US national security adviser to President Barack Obama. Prior to delivering the memorandum, Ijaz made clear that his military go between, Jones, the man who would deliver the memorandum to Mullen, required assurances that the document had clearance from the highest office in Pakistan, upon which Haqqani allegedly responded by telephone "he had the boss' approval".

=== Contents of the memo ===
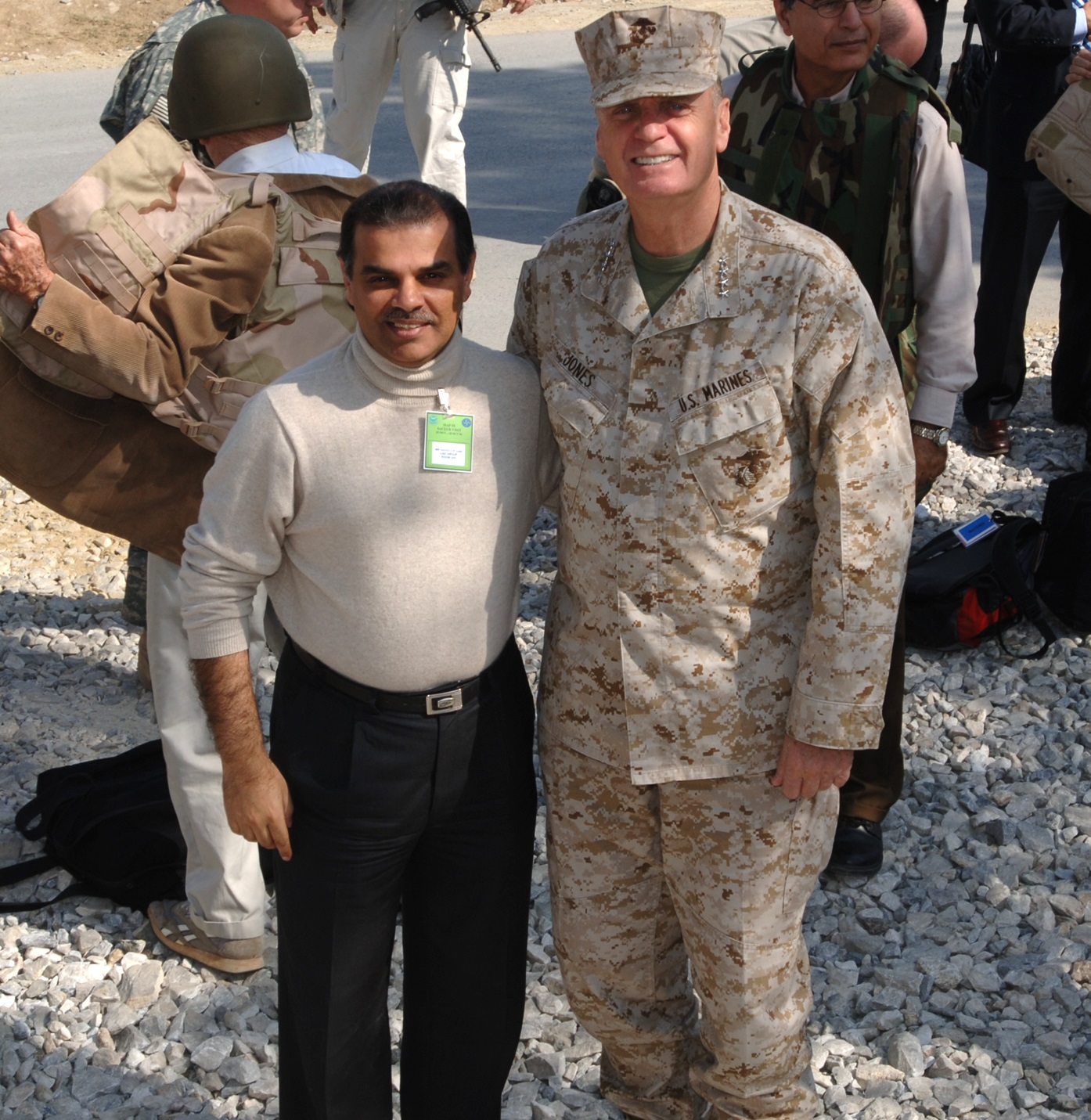
Ijaz with Gen. Jones at Bagram Air Base in Oct. 2006

Content of the confidential memo were published in its entirety on Foreign Policy magazine's website on 17 November. The memo was addressed to Michael Mullen, and requested the Obama administration to convey a "strong, urgent and direct message to General Kayani and General Pasha" to "end their brinkmanship aimed at bringing down the civilian apparatus".

The memo then makes certain explicit offers to the United States government in exchange for its support. These include the following quoted directly from the memo:

In the event Washington's direct intervention behind the scenes can be secured through your personal communication with Kayani (he will likely listen only to you at this moment) to stand down the Pakistani military-intelligence establishment, the new national security team is prepared, with full backing of the civilian apparatus, to do the following:

1. President of Pakistan will order an independent inquiry into the allegations that Pakistan harboured and offered assistance to UBL and other senior al-Qaeda operatives. The White House can suggest names of independent investigators to populate the panel, along the lines of the bipartisan 9/11 Commission, which operated from 2002 to 2004 and was charged with investigating the September 11 attacks.

2. The inquiry will be accountable and independent, and result in findings of tangible value to the US government and the American people that identify with exacting detail those elements responsible for harbouring and aiding UBL inside and close to the inner ring of influence in Pakistan s Government (civilian, intelligence directorates and military). It is certain that the UBL Commission will result in immediate termination of active service officers in the appropriate government offices and agencies found responsible for complicity in assisting UBL.

3. The new national security team will implement a policy of either handing over those left in the leadership of Al Qaeda or other affiliated terrorist groups who are still on Pakistani soil, including Ayman Al Zawahiri, Mullah Omar and Sirajuddin Haqqani, or giving US military forces a "green light" to conduct the necessary operations to capture or kill them on Pakistani soil. This "carte blanche" guarantee is not without political risks, but should demonstrate the new group's commitment to rooting out bad elements on our soil. This commitment has the backing of the top echelon on the civilian side of our house, and we will insure necessary collateral support.

4. One of the great fears of the military-intelligence establishment is that with your stealth capabilities to enter and exit Pakistani airspace at will, Pakistan's nuclear assets are now legitimate targets. The new national security team is prepared, with full backing of the Pakistani government – initially civilian but eventually all three power centres – to develop an acceptable framework of discipline for the nuclear program. This effort was begun under the previous military regime, with acceptable results. We are prepared to reactivate those ideas and build on them in a way that brings Pakistan's nuclear assets under a more verifiable, transparent regime.

5. The new national security team will eliminate Section S of the ISI charged with maintaining relations to the Taliban, Haqqani network, etc. This will dramatically improve relations with Afghanistan.

6. We are prepared to co-operate fully under the new national security team s guidance with the Indian government on bringing all perpetrators of Pakistani origin to account for the 2008 Mumbai attacks, whether outside government or inside any part of the government, including its intelligence agencies. This includes handing over those against whom sufficient evidence exists of guilt to the Indian security services.

=== Ijaz's claims in The Financial Times ===
On 10 October 2011, Ijaz wrote a column in the Financial Times revealing and confirming that he had helped deliver to Admiral Mullen a memorandum drafted by a Pakistani official stationed in the United States at the behest of President Zardari. The op-ed did not explicitly name Haqqani as being the author of the memo. This disclosure fuelled a frenzy in the Pakistani media while American press has largely remained silent in regards to any official US support of the plan. The affair became the buzz of front pages in Pakistan when Mullen admitted after previous denials that he had received the confidential memorandum soon after the raid on the bin Laden compound. Local media speculated as to the identity of the memo's author.

=== Admiral Mullen's statement ===
When asked whether he received the memo in May, Admiral Mullen said he had no knowledge of the memo but later changed his statement, saying he knew of the memo but "thought nothing of it." Pentagon spokesman Captain John Kirby stated in a press briefing that Mullen "does not know" and had "never communicated with Mr Ijaz".

Ostensibly the memo reached Mullen without any government seal or signature. Kirby suggested that "nothing about the letter had the imprimatur on the Pakistani government" and thus Mullen never acted on it. This initially led to debates in the Pakistani media as to the authenticity and credibility of the memorandum and has grown now to the resignation of Haqqani and a full investigation by the Pakistani supreme court.

A news report in the Pakistani press analysing the origins of the Mullen denial stated that the Mullen denial "was said to be the consequence of Husain Haqqani's persuasion, as the former ambassador had intimated about this well before Mullen's first reaction". The timeline of released Blackberry messages, the Financial Times article by Ijaz in October, and phone records released during the Supreme Court investigation all indicate that communication and possible action supporting a coup in Pakistan continued long after the offer was made in May 2011.

=== Speculations about Haqqani's involvement ===
In a rally at Minar-e-Pakistan in Lahore on 30 October 2011, Pakistan Tehreek-e-Insaf chairman Imran Khan accused Haqqani of involvement in the Mullen memo. It wasn't until later that Ijaz officially acknowledged Haqqani's involvement in public. The preemptive revelation by Khan led many journalists and media personalities, including television host Sana Bucha, to ask if the military establishment had been sponsoring PTI campaigns. Muhammad Malick, a senior correspondent with GEO News, later told anchorperson Hamid Mir that he had briefed Khan about Haqqani, moments before Khan's speech at the rally.

On 17 November 2011, the contents of the memorandum were made public on the Foreign Policy website and later in a local Pakistani newspaper, escalating rapidly to a scandal amongst the local media. Local media pundits debated the claims that the Pakistani president could be involved in a back-channel deal with the US to bring down the top leadership of Pakistan's military and install a new security team hand picked by Washington.

=== Haqqani's Recall and Resignation ===
In the wake of the release of the memo's contents Ambassador Haqqani was recalled from Washington to Pakistan. On 22 November 2011, an official meeting took place at the Prime Minister House in Islamabad between President Asif Ali Zardari, Prime Minister Yousaf Raza Gillani, Chief of Army Staff Ashfaq Parvez Kayani, Director General of ISI Ahmad Shuja Pasha, and Ambassador Haqqani. This meeting over the affairs of the memorandum was watched closely as many felt that the fallout could continue to claim victims, while in the press rumours of coups and actions by the military continued. Soon after, Haqqani tendered his resignation, which was accepted by the prime minister. To the media outlets and the general public in Pakistan, this came as no surprise, but was rather the expected outcome of the planned meeting.

=== Revelations in Newsweek ===
The Pakistani media discussed the fallout of the revelation of the memo's existence. Newsweek Pakistan published in its 2 December 2011 issue (published online Friday, 25 November) a limited account of the Memogate affair, as it was dubbed by the Pakistani press. The article gave a brief account of some of the events leading up to the controversy and explored the possible motivations and background of both Ijaz and Haqqani.

== Official responses ==
=== Government of Pakistan ===
- The Supreme Court of Pakistan dismissed the allegations, saying Pakistan was not so fragile a country that it could be rattled by the writing of a memo and declaring that "the Supreme Court has nothing to do with this matter."
- President Asif Ali Zardari termed the allegations as "a conspiracy against the Zardari government", further stating that he did not need intermediaries to convey messages since he had "direct access" to the president of the United States.
- Farahnaz Ispahani, wife of ambassador Haqqani and member of the National Assembly of Pakistan denied the ambassador was the author of the Mullen memo or that he had sent the memo over to Mansoor.
- Husain Haqqani refuted the BlackBerry Messenger email chain that was made public by Mansoor Ijaz stating that the message were likely a forgery. In the aftermath of the scandal Haqqani was recalled from Washington, placed under house arrest, and resigned from his position as Pakistani ambassador to the US. After returning home to Pakistan, and meeting with the president, prime minister, chief of army staff, and the DG ISI, he tendered his resignation which was immediately accepted by the PM.

=== Opposition in Pakistan ===
- Pakistani politicians have turned the scandal into a major political issue, accusing Ambassador Haqqani, President Zardari, and others in Pakistani government of compromising Pakistan's sovereignty, overstepping their powers by commanding the military to stand down, and conspiring against the Armed Forces of Pakistan.
- At a major political rally, Pakistan Muslim League (N) leader and former prime minister Nawaz Sharif, demanded an "urgent" inquiry into the matter. He also threatened to petition the Supreme Court of Pakistan, and resign from the National Assembly if the Zardari government did not satisfactorily investigate the matter.

=== United States Government ===
- While several people presently and formerly associated with the US Government have acknowledged the existence of the memo, the Obama administration has discussed the controversy in the public eye.
- When asked about the matter, US National Security Adviser Tom Donilon stated "I don't have a way to comment from this distance. I just don't have a way to comment on that from this distance at this point", while insisting that the United States and Pakistan shared a "critically important" relationship.
- Similarly, at a daily press briefing on 18 November 2011, US State Department Deputy Spokesperson Mark Toner stated "this is – I understand this is a big story in Pakistan. It's partly a domestic story. We – and we'll all treat it as such. I mean, our – we remain in contact with Ambassador Haqqani".
- Admiral Mike Mullen's former spokesman, captain John Kirby, acknowledged the existence of the memo, but clarified that "neither the contents of the memo nor the proof of its existence altered or affected in any way the manner in which Admiral Mullen conducted himself in his relationship with General Kayani and the Pakistani government. He took no note of it". Later, Kirby also stated that Admiral Mullen was confident the memo did not originate from President Zardari.
- In an email to Pakistani media, former National Security Advisor James L. Jones acknowledged that he personally delivered the memo to Admiral Mullen, but clarified that he was not a serving government official at the time he forwarded the message.

== Pakistani media responses ==
The Pakistani media has been largely split along lines of support and opposition for the current government, with narratives and coverage of the event varying wildly. The Pakistani paper The News created a web page dedicated to daily updates of the investigation and regularly used the term 'treasonous' in reference to the memo's contents and intentions of those involved. While Cyril Almeida argued in January: "What we're seeing right now is farcical. A national political crisis has been engineered on the basis of an unsigned memo, the contents of which are exceedingly unrealistic but have somehow compromised national security." The Wall Street Journal editorialised that, "If the claims at the heart of what the Pakistani media call "Memogate" are false, Mr. Haqqani has been defamed. If they're true, he's a patriot."

== See also ==
- Mediagate, a controversy revolving around media anchors, journalism ethics in Pakistan
