= Husain Haqqani =

Pakistani diplomat (born 1956)

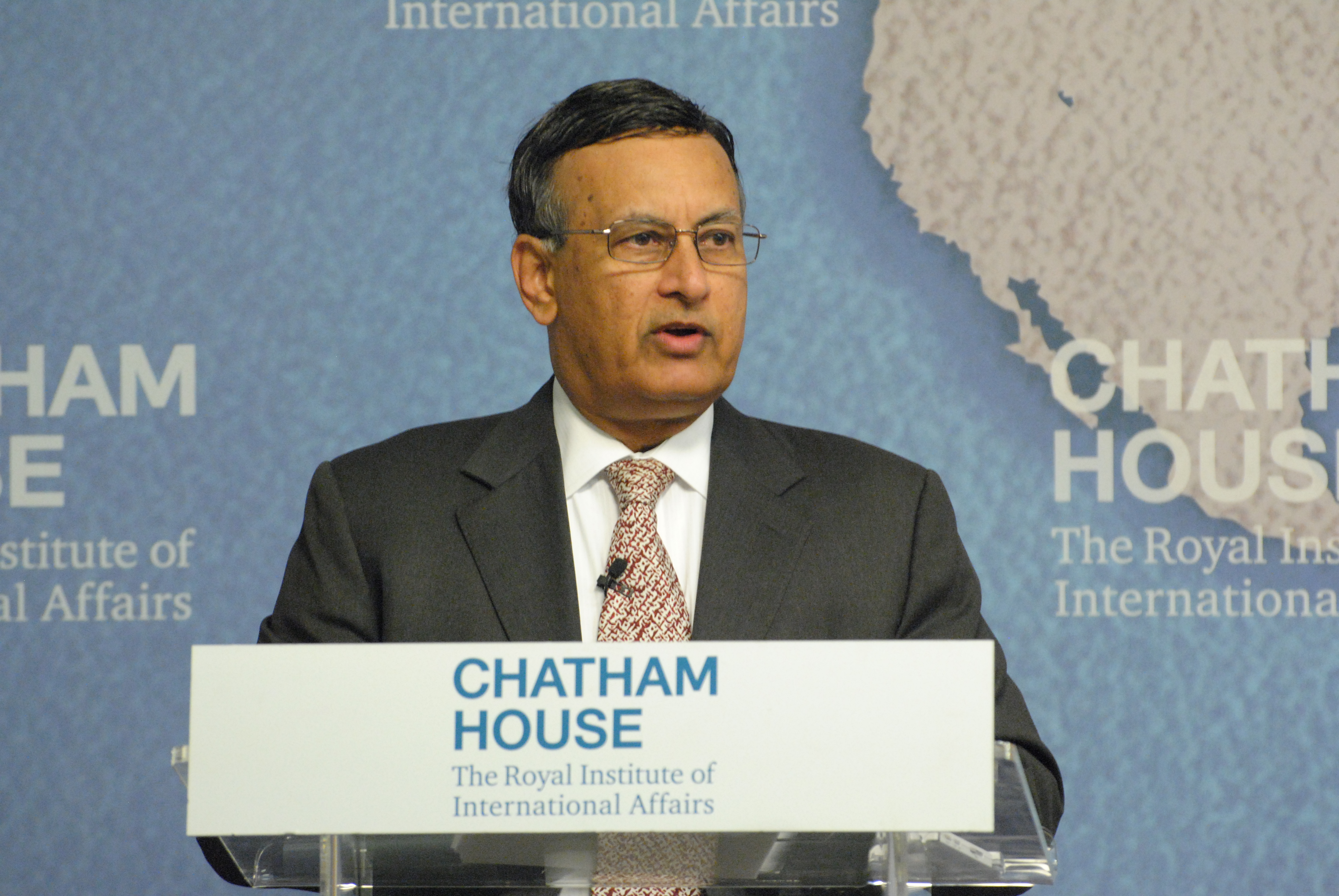

24th Pakistan Ambassador to the United States
- In office 13 April 2008 – 22 November 2011
- Preceded by: Mahmud Ali Durrani
- Succeeded by: Sherry Rehman

High Commissioner of Pakistan to Sri Lanka
- In office 11 May 1992 – 28 June 1993
- Preceded by: Tariq Mir
- Succeeded by: Tariq Altaf

Personal details
- Born: 1 July 1956 (age 70) Karachi, Pakistan
- Citizenship: Pakistan
- Spouse: Farahnaz Ispahani
- Education: University of Karachi
- Profession: South Asia expert, journalist, diplomat, academic and political activist
- Website: http://www.husainhaqqani.com/

Husain Haqqani (حُسَین حقّانی; born 1 July 1956) is a Pakistani journalist, academic, political activist, and former ambassador of Pakistan to Sri Lanka and the United States.

Haqqani has written four books on Pakistan, and his analyses have appeared in publications including The Wall Street Journal, The New York Times, Foreign Affairs, and Foreign Policy.

Haqqani is currently a Senior Fellow and Director for South and Central Asia at the Hudson Institute in Washington, D.C., and co-editor of Hudson's journal Current Trends in Islamist Ideology. He also is a Senior Research Fellow and Diplomat-in-Residence at the Anwar Gargash Diplomatic Academy in Abu Dhabi, which serves as a training institute for diplomats of the United Arab Emirates.

Haqqani worked as a journalist from 1980 to 1988, and then as political adviser for Nawaz Sharif and later as a spokesperson for Benazir Bhutto. According to author Javed Jabbar, the Islami Jamhuri Ittihad (IJI) ran a smear campaign against Benazir and Nusrat Bhutto during the 1988 election campaign by circulating and doctoring photographs to portray the women as Westernized women who were unfit to lead an Islamic nation. Jabbar wrote that "one of the individuals who engineered this defamatory, scurrilous campaign was Husain Haqqani." From 1992 to 1993 he was ambassador to Sri Lanka. In 1999, he was exiled following criticisms against the government of then-President Pervez Musharraf. From 2004 to 2008 he taught international relations at Boston University. He was appointed as Pakistan's ambassador in April 2008, but his tenure ended after the Memogate incident, when the claim was made that he had been insufficiently protective of Pakistan's interests. A judicial commission was set up by the Supreme Court of Pakistan to probe the allegations against him. According to commission's report which was issued in June 2012, Haqqani was declared guilty of authoring a memo which called for direct US intervention into Pakistan, though Pakistan's Supreme Court noted that the commission was only expressing an opinion. In February 2019, Pakistan's Chief Justice suggested the entire Memogate affair was a waste of time, saying that "Pakistan was not so fragile a country that it could be rattled by the writing of a memo."

== Early life and career ==
Haqqani was born in an Urdu-speaking family in Karachi. His father had migrated to Pakistan from Delhi after the partition of India. Haqqani began his interest in journalism in high school. In 1973 he joined Karachi University. He frequently visited the library at the US consulate, reading volumes of American history. Later, when students wanted to attack the consulate as part of a protest against the United States, Haqqani refused. Haqqani received a B.A. degree with distinction in 1977 and a MA degree in International Relations in 1980 from the University of Karachi.

Haqqani worked as a full-time journalist from 1980 to 1988. He covered the war in Afghanistan for Voice of America radio; served as the Pakistan and Afghanistan correspondent for Far Eastern Economic Review; and worked in Hong Kong as the East Asian correspondent for the London-based Arabia: the Islamic World Review as well as the Jamaat-e-Islami newspaper Jasarat. He worked for the state broadcaster Pakistan Television during the general elections of 1985.

== Political career ==
Haqqani started his political career at the University of Karachi, where he joined Islami Jamiat-e-Talaba, the student wing of the Jamaat-e-Islami and became president of the student union. Haqqani explained his association with Islamists as a student in an article in the Asian Wall Street Journal. "Over the last three decades, I have alternated between being attracted to and repulsed by political Islam." In recent years, he has emerged as a staunch critic of radical Islamist groups.

He started his national political career as a supporter of Zia-ul-Haq. In 1988, he worked in the political campaign for an alliance led by Ghulam Mustafa Jatoi, who was subsequently appointed Prime Minister. In 1990 he became Prime Minister Nawaz Sharif's special assistant and until 1992 functioned as his spokesman. From 1993 to 1995, he was spokesman to Prime Minister Benazir Bhutto.

Haqqani's appointment as media advisor to Bhutto was opposed by her brother and mother because of his political past. Haqqani allegedly "orchestrated a campaign of dirty tricks against the Bhutto women, publishing leaflets which showed their faces superimposed on nude bodies," a claim refuted by Benazir Bhutto.

From 1995 to 1996, Haqqani was chairman of the House Building Finance Corporation.

=== Pakistani diplomat ===
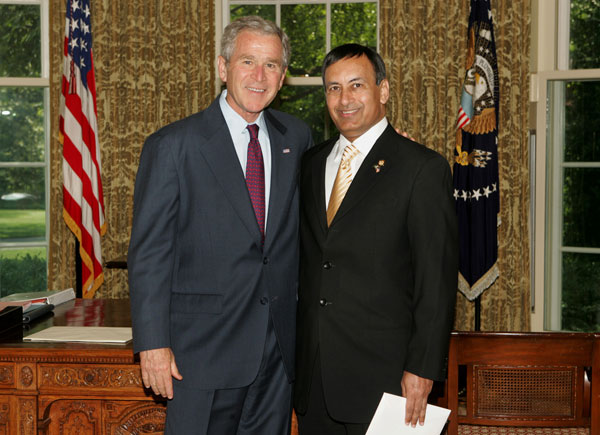
President Bush stands with Ambassador Husain Haqqani of the Islamic Republic of Pakistan, 6 June 2008, in the Oval Office during a credentials ceremony for newly appointed ambassadors to Washington, D.C.

In 1992 Husain Haqqani became one of Pakistan's youngest ambassadors, serving in Sri Lanka until 1993. He served as Pakistan's ambassador to the United States from 2008 during the government of Asif Ali Zardari. His tenure was not without controversy in Pakistan where he was called "Washington's ambassador to Pakistan," a play on his role of Pakistan's Ambassador in Washington, due to his pro-Western views. As a "pro-American ambassador in Washington," Haqqani provided visas for a large number of US operatives to enter Pakistan, under instructions from Islamabad, in the lead up to the raid that killed Osama bin Laden. He resigned in 2011 due to the memogate controversy.

=== Alleged secret memo and resignation ===
Roughly a week after the raid on Bin Laden, Haqqani reportedly asked a Pakistani American businessman Mansoor Ijaz to pass a message to the Americans, at the request of President Zardari, that the Pakistani military was planning to intervene. Ijaz revealed this in an opinion column in the Financial Times in October 2011, and mentioned that the message was communicated in an undated and unsigned memo sent to Admiral Michael Mullen, the Chairman of the Joint Chiefs of Staff of the US military. Later released to the press, the memo also spoke of a "unique window of opportunity" for the civilian government to gain the upper hand due to the military's complicity in the Bin Laden affair. According to Ijaz, the military intended to stage a coup to wash off the embarrassment issuing from the raid on Bin Laden, and he drafted the memo in consultation with Haqqani.

Haqqani resigned but denied writing the memo. He was recalled to Pakistan and accused of high treason. On the basis of a petition filed by the PML-N, the Supreme Court of Pakistan launched an investigation overriding the government, which had also started a parliamentary investigation.

While a judicial commission appointed by the Supreme Court of Pakistan investigated, Haqqani was not allowed to leave the country. He sought refuge in the presidential palace and later the Prime Minister's residence, citing threats to his life by extremist groups that accused him of treason.

In January 2012, Pakistan's Supreme Court allowed Haqqani to leave the country. The Judicial Commission completed its investigation apparently without hearing from Haqqani, and submitted its report in June 2012 in sealed envelopes. It asserted that Haqqani had indeed authored the memo, whose purpose was taken to be assuring the United States that the civilian government was its ally. It also declared that Haqqani had undermined the country's security and he had misled Ijaz to believe the memorandum had the Pakistani president's approval. The commission's report further stated that "Husain Haqqani was not loyal to Pakistan" in drafting that memo.

Pakistan's Supreme Court noted that the commission was only expressing its opinion.

Haqqani said the Commission's report was one-sided and defended his patriotism and his innocence. Haqqani has not returned to Pakistan, citing threats on his life. In 2018, former Pakistani Prime Minister Nawaz Sharif said it was a mistake to take up the case with the Supreme Court, suggesting the government had been acting under external pressure. In 2019, Pakistan's Supreme Court wrapped up the case saying that "the Supreme Court has nothing to do with this matter."

=== Relationship with Pakistan's military ===
Husain Haqqani has long had a difficult relationship with Pakistan's military. Haqqani had made enemies among some in Pakistan's military due to his criticism of the Army. In 1999, he was kidnapped by Pakistani intelligence agents who roughed him up and held him for two months until a court ordered his release. The powerful Inter-Services Intelligence Agency (ISI) tried to stop Haqqani from being appointed Ambassador to the United States and kept him under regular surveillance during his tenure due to his criticism of the military.

There are, however, indications that Haqqani's relationship with the Pakistani military has improved. In December 2022, the Pakistani daily Dawn reported that Haqqani was subcontracted by former CIA Islamabad station chief Robert Grenier to conduct "research" on Pakistan. Grenier was acting as a registered lobbyist for the Pakistani government. The Dawn report cited a public disclosure filed by Grenier in November 2022 as required by the Foreign Agents Registration Act.

Officials with ex-prime minister Imran Khan's Pakistan Tehreek-e Insaf (PTI) party allege that Haqqani was acting on behalf of a "senior figure in the [Pakistani] military establishment." Haqqani has denied these charges, but has not explained the nature of his work for a Pakistani government lobbyist. Since receiving payments from Grenier in September and October 2021, Haqqani has called for the U.S. and Pakistan to reengage. He has also praised the now-former army chief General Qamar Javed Bajwa. In October 2022, a "study group" led by Haqqani released a report during Bajwa's visit to Washington calling for both countries to "find a way to work on areas of mutual concern."

As per Imran Khan, Haqqani was hired to lobby against his government in the US. Khan has cited the cypher leak controversy as proof of his ouster.

=== Relationship with the United Arab Emirates ===
Haqqani has had a longtime relationship with the United Arab Emirates. He has served as a columnist for the UAE-based Gulf News for over two decades. In 2017, Haqqani appeared on a documentary critical of Qatar, titled "Qatar: A Dangerous Alliance," produced by a UAE-based company. In 2018, he spoke on human rights in Qatar at a London conference organized by the Foundation for Sports Integrity conference, which campaigned against Qatar's hosting of the 2022 football World Cup.

In 2023, Haqqani joined the Anwar Gargash Diplomatic Academy in Abu Dhabi as a senior fellow.

== Academic career ==
From 2004 to 2008, Haqqani was an associate professor for international relations at Boston University. In addition, he co-chaired the Project on Islam and Democracy at the Hudson Institute in Washington, and was co-editor of the international scholarly journal Current Trends in Islamist Ideology. Among his numerous writing credits are "Pakistan Between Mosque and Military" for the Carnegie Endowment for International Peace; "Islam's Medieval Outposts" for the journal Foreign Policy, and "The Role of Islam in Pakistan's Future" for Washington Quarterly. From 2012 to 2014 Haqqani was Professor of the Practice of International Relations and Director of Boston University's Center for International Relations. During Fall 2015, Haqqani was a Resident Fellow at the University of Chicago Institute of Politics.

=== Foreign Policy Global Thinker 2013 ===
Husain Haqqani was named among Foreign Policy magazine's Top 100 Global thinkers for 2012 along with his wife Farahnaz Ispahani "for pushing tough love for their troubled country." The magazine wrote that "Husain Haqqani and Farahnaz Ispahani have spent their careers fighting the slow-motion radicalization of Pakistan—even as it became increasingly obvious that the deck was stacked against them."

== Books ==
Haqqani has authored four books on Pakistan.

- The first, Pakistan: Between Mosque and Military, was published by the Carnegie Endowment for International Peace in 2005. In the book, Haqqani examines the relationship between Pakistan's armed forces and Islamist groups as a function of Pakistan's search for identity and security.
- Haqqani's second book, Magnificent Delusions: Pakistan, the United States, and an Epic History of Misunderstanding, was published by PublicAffairs on 5 November 2013. In this book, Haqqani reviews the history of U.S.-Pakistan relations. Magnificent Delusions was included in a list of the "best books about the rest of the world" by The Daily Beast, who called it "compulsory reading for members of Congress and officials at the State Department.".
- Haqqani published his third book in May 2016. Titled India vs Pakistan, it is a short history of the India-Pakistan relationship published by Juggernaut Books.
- In 2018, Haqqani's fourth book, Reimagining Pakistan: Transforming a Dysfunctional Nuclear State, was published by HarperCollins. The books "offers a candid discussion of Pakistan's origins and its current failings, with suggestions for reconsidering its ideology, and identifies a national purpose greater than the rivalry with India."

== Views ==
Husain Haqqani has described Islamist extremism as "the single most dangerous idea that has emerged in the Muslim world". He has called on Pakistan to crack down on Islamist militants, and has cautioned the U.S. against trying to negotiate with the Afghan Taliban, who he describes as "a movement with an extreme ideology [that] will not compromise easily on their deeply held beliefs." In 2019, he warned not to trust the Taliban and that a U.S. withdrawal would leave a power vacuum to be filled by terrorists, and in 2021 he predicted that Pakistan would come to regret aiding the Taliban's resurgence.

The Wall Street Journal described Haqqani as "a hostage" while he was in Pakistan and published an interview with him from the Prime Minister's house in which he outlined why he was hated by Pakistan's intelligence services and Jihadi groups. Michel Hirsh, writing in The Atlantic, described Haqqani as "The Last Friendly Pakistani" towards the US. Jeffrey Goldberg, writing for The Atlantic and Bloomberg News, has been a consistent supporter of Haqqani, calling him "The Hardest Working Man in Washington" and criticising Pakistan's military and security services. Simon Tisdall of The Guardian called Haqqani "an instinctive ally of the west" and attributed Memogate to the ambassador's difficult relationship with Pakistan intelligence service.

In 2017, Pakistan's Foreign Minister alleged that Haqqani had authored US President Donald Trump's South Asia policy. Earlier that year, Haqqani co-authored a report on Pakistan with Lisa Curtis, who would go on to become Senior Director for South and Central Asia at the National Security Council. His critics in Pakistan describe him as a sympathizer of the Indian lobby in the US. Haqqani has been vocal against the sale of F-16 fighter jets and AH-1Z Viper helicopters to Pakistan. He testified in the US Congress in December 2015 stating that the sale of F-16s to Pakistan would only lead to their usage against India, The Indian government also opposed and protested against the proposed sale of 8 F-16s to Pakistan. Pakistan's Senate Defense Committee blamed him for working with pro-Indian lobbyists in Washington. Haqqani has called on the Pakistani people to push the government of Pakistan to issue an official apology to Bangladesh for the 1971 genocide.

== Personal life ==
Haqqani is a citizen of Pakistan and he stated in 2019 that he currently holds a Pakistani passport. In March 2000, Haqqani married Farahnaz Ispahani, a former producer at CNN and MSNBC, member of the Pakistani National Assembly, and the granddaughter of Mirza Abol Hassan Ispahani, Pakistan's first ambassador to Washington. The Pakistan Ambassador's residence in Washington was purchased and donated by her grandfather. Haqqani has lived in the United States since 2002.

== Bibliography ==
- Fair, C. Christine (2012), "Pakistan in 2011: Ten Years of the "War on Terror"", Asian Survey, 52 (1): 100–113, doi:10.1525/as.2012.52.1.100, JSTOR 10.1525/as.2012.52.1.100
- Fair, C. Christine (2015), "Democracy on the Leash in Pakistan", in C. Christine Fair; Sarah J. Watson (eds.), Pakistan's Enduring Challenges, University of Pennsylvania Press, pp. 131–155, ISBN 978-0812246902
- Gul, Imtiaz (2012), Pakistan: Before and After Osama, Roli Books Private Limited, ISBN 978-9351940289
- Jalal, Ayesha (2014), The Struggle for Pakistan: A Muslim Homeland and Global Politics, Harvard University Press, ISBN 978-0674744998
- Kalhan, Anil (2013), "'Gray Zone' – Constitutionalism and the Dilemma of Judicial Independence in Pakistan.", Vanderbilt Journal of Transnational Law, 46 (1), SSRN 2087116
- Siddique, Osama (2015), "The Judicializationof Politics in Pakistan: The Supreme Court after the Lawyers' Movement", in Mark Tushnet; Madhav Khosla (eds.), Unstable Constitutionalism: Law and Politics in South Asia, Cambridge University Press, pp. 159–192, ISBN 978-1316419083
- Kumar Rupesinghe; Khawar Mumtaz (1996), Internal conflicts in South Asia, The University of Michigan, ISBN 978-0803977525

Diplomatic posts
Preceded by Tariq M. Mir	Pakistan Ambassador to Sri Lanka; 1992–1993	Succeeded by Tariq Altaf
Preceded by Mahmud Ali Durrani	Pakistan Ambassador to the United States; 2008–2011	Succeeded by Sherry Rehman
