= CIA activities in Sudan =

Sudan has a conflict in the Darfur area of western Sudan. The Khartoum government had, in the past, given sanctuary to trans-national Islamic terrorists, but, according to the 9/11 Commission Report, ousted al-Qaeda and cooperated with the US against such groups while simultaneously involving itself in human rights abuses in Darfur. There are also transborder issues between Chad and Darfur, and, to a lesser extent, with the Central African Republic.

== Timeline of activities ==
=== 1995 ===
Starting in 1995, Sudan offered extradition or interviews of arrested al-Qaeda operatives, as well as allowing access to the extensive files of Sudanese intelligence. He said the blame for the failure lay in the 'irrational hatred' the Clinton administration felt for the source of the proffered intelligence – Sudan, where bin Laden and his leading followers were based from 1992 to 1996. He added that after a slow thaw in relations which began last year, it was only now that the Sudanese information was being properly examined for the first time."

=== 1996 ===
According to The Washington Post, the US government decided, in 1996, to send nearly $20 million of military equipment through the 'front-line' states of Ethiopia, Eritrea and Uganda to help the Sudanese opposition overthrow the Khartoum regime." While this is indicative of Clinton Administration policy, the article did not explicitly mention CIA as part of the operation, and, if this is basically military aid, the Defense and State Departments would normally handle the transactions.

=== 2001 ===
In September, Walter H. Kansteiner, III, the US Assistant Secretary of State for Africa, FBI and CIA representatives, and Yahia Hussien Baviker, the Sudanese intelligence deputy chief met in London to discuss sharing information.

=== 2005 ===
Democracy Now reported on May 3, 2005:

The Los Angeles Times has revealed that the U.S. has quietly forged a close intelligence partnership with Sudan despite the government’s role in the mass killings in Darfur.

This reflected White House level policy tradeoffs between the competing priorities of transnational terrorism and national human rights.

=== 2006 ===
Human Rights Watch addressed this balancing act, referring to the CIA in the balancing act with Salah Gosh:

=== 2007 ===
In June 2007, the Khartoum government rebuffed appeals by the new French foreign minister, Bernard Kouchner, to allow a UN-African Union force into Darfur." Chad, on the eastern border of Darfur, is a traditional French client.

The Sudan Tribune reported on July 27, 2007, that

Sudan’s interior minister accused Central Intelligence Agency of smuggling weapons into the troubled region of Darfur.

Interior Minister Zubair Bashir Taha addressing a crowd consisting of youth organizations said that the CIA is seeking to “disrupt the demographics of Darfur”.

The US special envoy to Darfur Andrew Natsios told reporters in Khartoum last week that Arab groups from neighboring countries were resettling in West Darfur and other lands traditionally belonging to local African tribes.

Taha accused the US of being responsible for “prolonging the war in Darfur and the death of thousands of people after the Abuja peace agreement just like they did in Iraq”.

Interior Minister Zubair Taha offered no evidence for his allegations.

Salah Gosh, head of Khartoum's intelligence organization, said they have maintained strong relationships with US agencies, in the context of counter-terror. In yet another of the situation where US interests in counter-terror and human rights are at odds with another, especially when the two interests are in different parts of Sudan, Gosh told the Al-Ahdath daily from Libya that the cooperation with the US “helped avert devastating measures [by US administration] against Sudan”. The US had flown Gosh to the US in April 2005 to discuss capture of terror suspects. Gosh also is suspected of complicity in human rights abuses in Darfur, so he was subsequently denied admission to the US for medical treatment.

US human rights groups want no contact with Gosh has orchestrated human right abuses in the war ravaged region of Darfur. The widespread criticism forced the US administration to subsequently deny Gosh entry to seek medical treatment for a heart condition.

The extent of cooperation is not clear. In July 2006, president Omar Al-Bashir told reporters that cooperation with CIA was on a limited basis. A spokesman for Sudan's National Security and Intelligence Service told the government sponsored Sudanese Media Center (SMC) that cooperation with CIA is taking place within the Sudan's boundaries only.

But Sudan's former foreign minister Mustafa Ismail speaking to Los Angeles Times in 2005, said that his government “already has served as the eyes and ears of the CIA in Somalia”. Gosh and Sudan, in spite of the Darfur situation, have been reported, by the Sudan Tribune, to have provided HUMINT from Iraq.

The US special envoy to Darfur Andrew Natsios told reporters in Khartoum last week that Arab groups from neighboring countries were resettling in West Darfur and other lands traditionally belonging to local African tribes.

Taha accused the US of being responsible for “prolonging the war in Darfur and the death of thousands of people after the Abuja peace agreement just like they did in Iraq”. Taha offered no specific evidence that the US was arming anyone in Darfur.
