= Altaf Hossain Chowdhury (Faridpur politician) =

Bangladeshi politician

Member of Bangladesh Parliament
- In office 18 February 1979 – 12 February 1982

Personal details
- Party: Bangladesh Nationalist Party

Altaf Hossain Chowdhury (Bengali: আলতাফ হোসেন চৌধুরী) is a Bangladesh Nationalist Party politician and a former member of parliament for Faridpur-13.

== Career ==
Chowdhury was elected to parliament from Faridpur-13 as a Bangladesh Nationalist Party candidate in 1979.
