= Tariq Altaf =

Tariq Altaf (1946–2001) was a diplomat of the government of Pakistan.

== History ==
Tariq Altaf served as Pakistan's ambassador to Sri Lanka from June 28, 1993 to 2000. He then served as High Commissioner to Canada until September 21, 2001, when he died as a result of a car crash.

He was heading home in a chauffeured car on Sussex Drive in Ottawa, when it collided with a vehicle driven by a seventeen-year-old male, pushing both vehicles into oncoming traffic. The teenager was charged in October 2001 with careless driving and driving with improper tires. Pakistani officials expressed satisfaction with the charges.

Diplomatic posts
Preceded by Husain Haqqani	Pakistan Ambassador to Sri Lanka; 1993 – 2000	Unknown
