= Shakarganj =

Industrial company in Pakistan

Shakarganj Limited (Urdu: شکر گنج), formerly known as Shakarganj Mills Limited, is a Pakistani conglomerate company active in the sugar, foods, and milk industries.

== History ==
The company was established in 1967 by a Chinioti business family and is based in Lahore, Pakistan. Shakarganj Limited is a publicly traded company traded on the Pakistan Stock Exchange.

In March 2003, the company produced more than 90,000 tons of sugar.

In August 2008, a new biogas power plant in Jhang, Pakistan was inaugurated which will generate enough power to support more than 50,000 homes.

== Subsidiaries ==
Many of this business group's manufacturing facilities are located at Jhang District, Punjab, Pakistan.

Shakarganj group has the following production units:

- Sugar Mills
- Biofuel Power
- Building Materials
- Food Products (a leading Pakistani producer of dairy products and fruit juices)
- Textile Division (yarn production)
- Farming (crops include sugarcane, wheat, gram, maize or corn, fodder and seasonal vegetables)
