= Altaf Wani =

American academic

Altaf A. Wani is a retired professor in the Department of Radiology and the Department of Cellular and Molecular Biology at Ohio State University (OSU). He was a member of Molecular Carcinogenesis and Chemoprevention program of the James Cancer Hospital and Research Institute. Wani was the Director of Molecular Carcinogenesis Laboratory and conducts basic cancer research in the area of DNA damage and repair.

He is a Graduate Studies Committee member of the Ohio State Biochemistry Program and a member of the Integrated Biomedical Graduate Program. He served on the Appointments, Tenure and Promotion Committee of the OSU College of Medicine and Public Health. He represents his department at the University Faculty Council and Senate.

Wani is a member of the American Association for the Advancement of Science (AAAS), American Society of Biochemistry and Molecular Biology, Environmental Mutagen Society and American Society for Photobiology. In 2004 he was inducted as an AAAS Fellow. He serves on the National Institutes of Health (NIH) chartered XNDA study-section and on ad hoc basis on other NIH panels.
