= Hydropolis, Dubai =

Proposed underwater hotel project in Dubai

Coordinates: 25°5′12″N 55°8′3″E

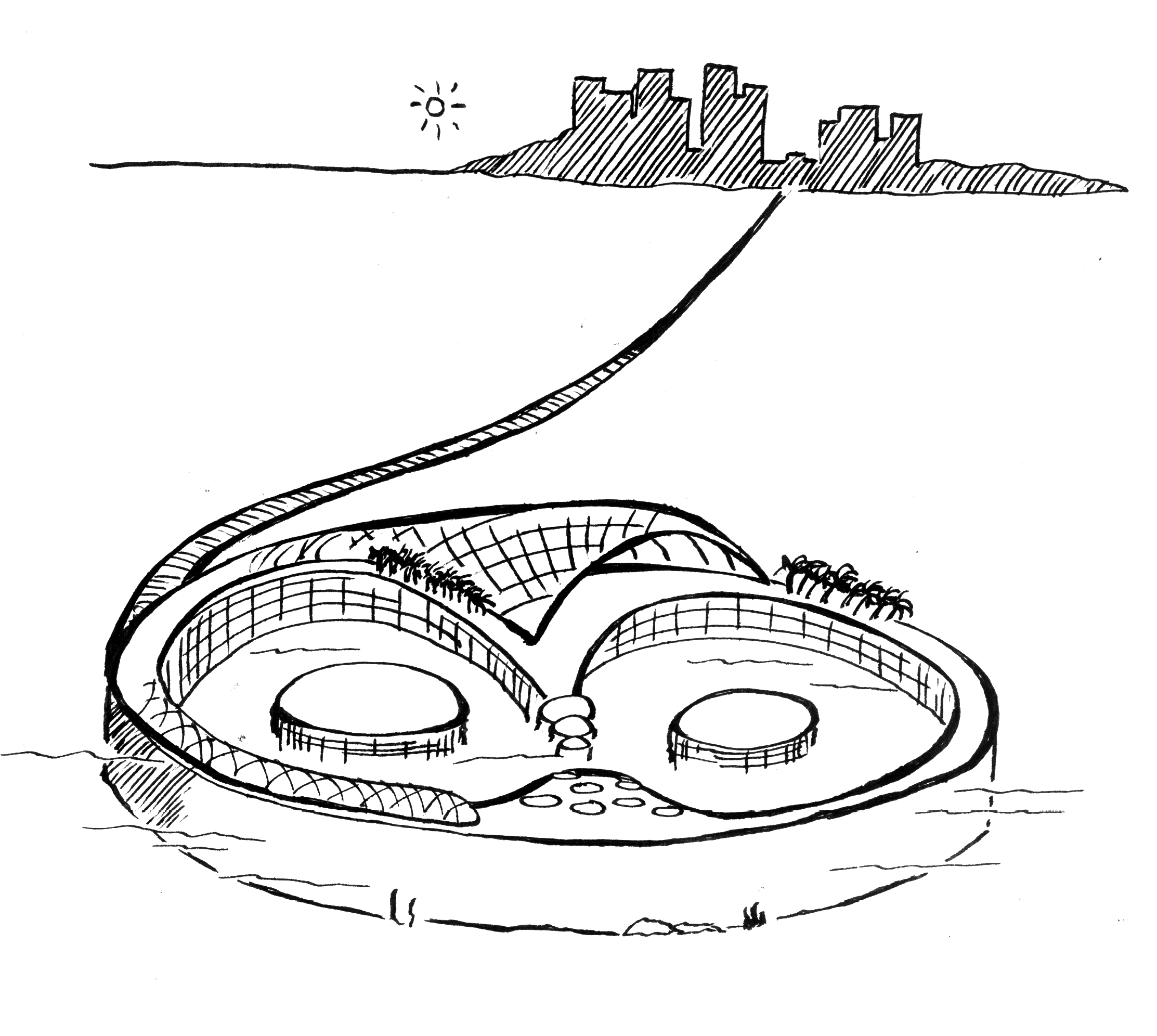
Sketch of the hotel design

The Hydropolis Underwater Hotel and Resort is a proposed underwater hotel in Dubai. It would be the first multi-room underwater hotel in the world.

The original plan was to locate it 20 meters (66 ft) underwater off the coast of Jumeirah Beach, although this site was later found to be unsuitable. The hotel's plan is to cover an area of 260 hectares (640 acres).

Originally announced in 2005, the plans had been put on hold by 2014. It is unlikely it will start up again.

== Origin ==
The hotel was planned in the Persian Gulf off Dubai through the mediation of the Hans Peter Pesenhofer following plans of Siemens IBC (Prof. Roland Dieterle) in cooperation with the German Designer Joachim Hauser (Bitterfeld) and with the approval of the DDIA. The hotel's original plan was to be located 20 meters underwater off the coast of Jumeriah beach. The hotel's plan was to cover an area of 260 hectares, an area equivalent to Hyde Park in London. The construction cost for Hydropolis was approximately €600 million Euro, which would have made Hydropolis one of the most expensive hotels ever created. The hotel design was created by Joachim Hauser and Professor Roland Dieterle, and was planned to be composed of three segments: a land station, a connecting train, and the underwater hotel. Joachim Hauser's and Prof. Roland Dieterle's architecture idea was to represent the connection between humans and water. The initial planned opening year was 2006, but due to financial reasons and disagreements with the DDIA (Dubai Development & Investment Authority), the project was already canceled by the DDIA in October 2004. Hydropolis Holdings LLC Dubai was holding the original intellectual property rights of Hydropolis.

== Land station ==
The design of the land station was of a wave-shaped 30,000 square meter building. The purpose of the land station would have been to provide a place for guests to board the soundless train that would descend into the hotel. Secondary purposes for the land station include greeting guests, and use of the land station's facilities. The land station was planned to feature many facilities, including a marine research laboratory, a plastic surgery clinic, conference facilities, a restaurant, and a theater. The theater was intended to feature films about the evolution of life and the history of underwater architecture.

=== Power and tunnel ===
The noiseless train would have been located in a 515-meter-long (1,690 ft), transparent, double-track tunnel, made of plexiglass reinforced with concrete and steel. This train will be powered by an automated cable propulsion system. This automated cable propulsion system would have consisted of a stationary motor and cables with the train cars fixed to the cables. The stationary motor for the train system would have been located in the land station, and would have been connected to cables running down the length of the tunnel. The train cars, fixed to these cables, would have been moved up and down the tunnel solely from the power of the land motor. This system was considered be advantageous because separating the motor from the train cars would decrease noise in the tunnel. This decreases noise because the motor is the main source of noise in this train system. With the motor separate from the train cars, noise in the cars and tunnel would have been minimized. Another advantage of this system is that a separate motor results in less mechanical parts in the car, which also mean less repairs on the actual train cars.

=== Cars and logistic Systems ===
Rubber wheels were chosen over other types of wheel, such as steel, to minimize noise. Rubber wheels have a property of making little noise as they roll on surfaces such as plexiglass. The noiseless train would have served two purposes: transferring guests and supplying the underwater hotel. Supplies would have been packed on land, and delivered efficiently to the hotel to minimize the space taken up by goods in the hotel. Cars transferring supplies would have feature palettes, and cars transferring passengers would have provided a view of the ocean. The guest-transporting aspect of the train would have had a maximum efficiency of 1000 people per hour.

== Underwater hotel ==
The underwater hotel would have been a jellyfish-like structure. The underwater hotel would have been located 20 meters underneath the surface of the ocean. To handle the underwater pressures, the hotel's main structure was planned to be a dome composed of plexiglass, reinforced with concrete and steel. The underwater hotel would have been composed of 220 underwater suites with a cost of $5500 per night. In addition to the underwater suites, Hydropolis was planned to have many other underwater accommodations including restaurants, a spa, a cinema, a ballroom, and bars. The underwater hotel was planned to not only be a place for regular guests, but also a place for visitors to explore.
