= PPSC =

PPSC may refer to:

- Pikes Peak State College
- Public Prosecution Service of Canada
- Punjab Public Service Commission (India)
- Punjab Public Service Commission (Pakistan)
