= Punjab Public Service Commission =

Punjab Public Service Commission may refer to:

- Punjab Public Service Commission (India), a government agency of the Indian state of Punjab
- Punjab Public Service Commission (Pakistan), a government agency of the Pakistani province of Punjab
