= Jamshed Gulzar Kiani =

Pakistani general (1944–2008)

Lieutenant General Jamshaid Gulzar Kayani HI(M) SJ SBt TJ
- Kiani (1944–2008), c. 1999.

Chairman of the Federal Public Service Commission
- In office 14 October 2004 – 30 March 2006
- Preceded by: Aziz Ahmad Bilour
- Succeeded by: Shahid Aziz

Personal details
- Born: Jamshaid Gulzar Kiani; 20 July 1944 Bombay, British India (present-day Mumbai, India)
- Died: 1 November 2008 (aged 64) CMH Rawalpindi, Punjab, Pakistan
- Cause of death: Acute abdomen
- Resting place: Westridge cemetery
- Citizenship: Pakistan
- Education: Pakistan Military Academy; National Defence University
- Nickname(s): James; Kiyani

Military service
- Allegiance: Pakistan
- Branch/service: Pakistan Army
- Years of service: 1964–2004
- Rank: Lieutenant-General
- Unit: 22 Baloch Regiment- LAT
- Commands: Baloch Regiment; X Corps, Rawalpindi; Adjutant General at Army GHQ; DG Military Intelligence; 111th Infantry Brigade
- Battles/wars: Indo-Pakistani War of 1965; Bangladesh Liberation War; Indo-Pakistani War of 1971; Indo-Pakistani War of 1999; Indo-Pakistani standoff in 2001–02; War in North-West Pakistan
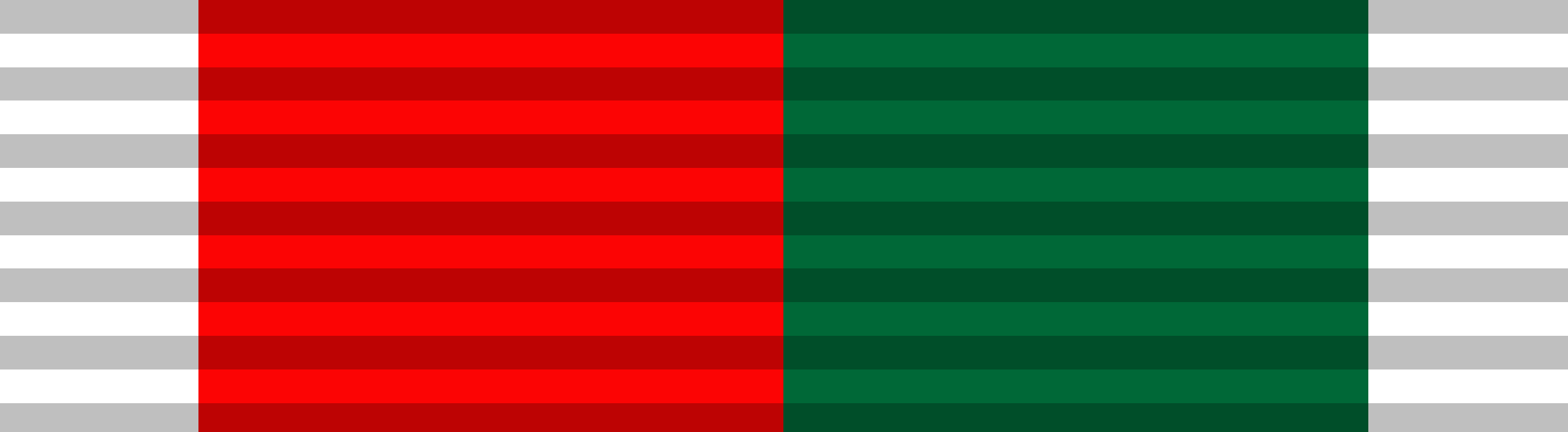
- Awards: Hilal-e-Imtiaz Sitara-e-Jurat Sitara-e-Basalat Tamgha-i-Jurat

Jamshed Gulzar Kiani (Urdu: جمشید گلزار کیانی; b.20 July 1944 – 1 November 2008), HI(M), SJ, SBt, TJ, was a three-star rank army general in the Pakistan Army, intelligence officer and the former Colonel Commandant of the Baloch Regiment and commander of X Corps.

Kiani came into limelight when he had served as Director-General of the Pakistan Army's Military Intelligence and the commander of the X Corps. Later, Kiani had served as a chairman of Federal Public Service Commission during the General Musharraf's regime and had to leave when he and the then Prime Minister Shaukat Aziz developed differences.

== Biography ==
=== Early life and military service ===
Jamshed Gulzar Kiani was born on 20 July 1944 in Bombay, British India. He was educated at the Gordon College before accepting at the military academy. He attended and graduated from the Pakistan Military Academy in the class of 38th PMA Long Course, and gained commissioned in the Baloch Regiment as 2nd Lt. in 1964. He participated in the second war with India, leading a platnoon, and later joined the ISI as an intelligence officer.

In 1969–71, Captain Kiani was stationed in Dacca, East Pakistan as an ISI analyst, joining the GHQ Dhaka of the Eastern Command led by its commander, Lieutenant-General A.A.K. Niazi. During this time, Capt. Kiani developed serious problems on the military strategy led by General Niazi, publicly disagreeing with him over the law and order issue, specifically in regards to the intelligence based on the air operations led by the Indian IAF and Indian Navy in East. Capt. Kiani fought against the Indian Army on the eastern border but due to his objections on General Niazi's and his staff, he was recalled to back to Pakistan, avoiding becoming prisoner of war.

In interview given to Dr. Shahid Masood, Kiani had famously called that: "General Niazi was a total and abject failure general who had no control over the situation." While in East, Capt. Kiani was confided with the information from the U.S.Consulate-General in Dhaka that the 7th Fleet had been deployed for Pakistani soldiers' relieve and retreat. However, the 7th Fleet never arrived due to Soviet Union's Pacific Fleet began trailing the American fleet, making it unable to assist in Pakistani defense.

About the surrender of Eastern Command, Kiani said: our soldiers fought diligently and bravely but it was the military leadership that failed in East, not soldiers.

In 1972, he was promoted as Major, continuing his service with the ISI in Karachi, where he worked on the classified assignments covering the security and intelligence management. In 1980s, he went to attend the National Defence University (NDU) and graduated with MSc in War studies before posting back to the Military Intelligence (MI) where Colonel Kiani worked with then-Brigadier Pervez Musharraf on Siachen mission helping him to secure two intermediate posts, Bilafond La in Siachen Glacier.

In the 1990s, Brig. Kiani held the command of the 111th Infantry Brigade in Rawalpindi, as his one-star assignment before being promoted as Major-General in 1996–97.

=== Kargil debacle and X Corps ===
In 1999, Major-General Kiani was the Director-General of the Military Intelligence when the Kargil fiasco took place with the Indian Army.

Major-General Kiani's career remained hidden in the public until coming to the public notice when the news media identified him as the GOC-in-C of the X Corps, when the military takeover took place in October 1999. During the interview with Shahid Masood in Geo News, Kiani clarified his role by stating that he was the major-general during the coup d'état and was promoted to three-star assignment on 1 November 1999.

Lieutenant-General Kiani took over the command of the X Corps from the outgoing Lieutenant-General Mahmud Ahmed, which he led until 2001. Lieutenant-General Kiani attended the meeting Chief of Army Staff General Pervez Musharraf regarding the terrorist attacks in New York, United States where he, along with others, dissented from the war on terror policy.

== Chairman Federal Public Service Commission (2004–06) ==
General Kiani retired from his military service on 14 October 2004, and was announced to be appointed as the Chairman of the Federal Public Service Commission (FPSC), a government institution responsible for the appointment of the bureaucrats in the Federal Government of Pakistan.

Kiani developed serious differences with Prime Minister Shaukat Aziz in 2006 over introducing of an ordinance. He had severe confrontation with Prime Minister Aziz and was of the view that the row between two men had become a personalized affair though he had pleaded President Musharraf not to drag the FPSC into a controversy. Kiani was succeeded by Shahid Aziz.

On 30 March 2006, Kiani resigned from the FPSC's chairmanship after the government reduced his tenure by two-and-a-half years through a presidential ordinance. On 13 May 2006, Kiani filed a petition of his dismissal in the Lahore High Court which was declined, therefore, Kiani filed a lawsuit against President Musharraf in the Supreme Court of Pakistan.

A Supreme Court bench was constituted under Justice F.M. Khokhar and issued legal notices to President Musharraf, and Prime Minister Aziz's government to appear before the trial. However, before the trial took place, President Musharraf made an unsuccessful move suspend and dismissed Chief Justice Iftikhar Muhammad Chaudhry, and declared a state of emergency in 2007.

== Death ==
Shortly after his interview with Shahid Masood on Geo News, Kiani was admitted to the CMH in Rawalpindi with the complaint of pain in abdomen where military doctors diagnosed an infection in his stomach and suggested an operation. Despite his operation, his condition deteriorated and kept on ICU ward in a state of coma and died on 1 November 2008 at the age of 64.

His funeral was attended a large number of people belonging to various walks of life besides including the Chief of Army Staff General Ashfaq Pervez Kiani, Chairman Joint Chiefs of Staff Committee General Tariq Majeed, Corps Commander Rawalpindi Lieutenant General Tahir Mehmood, former COAS General Mirza Aslam Baig, former DG ISI General (Retd) Hameed Gul, Regional Police Officer (RPO) Nasir Khan Durrani, members of Pakistan Ex‑Servicemen Association, ex‑Generals, political figures, former Azad Jammu and Kashmir President Sardar M. Anwar Khan, President and General Secretary of Lahore High Court Bar Association (LHCBA) Sardar Asmat Ullah Khan and Malik Siddique Awan and other lawyers. He was survived by his wife and three daughters.

== Dissent and criticism on Musharraf ==
On 2 June 2008, Kiani appeared in Meray Mutabiq, a political talk show, on Geo News and was interviewed by Dr. Shahid Masood where he severely criticised President Pervez Musharraf and his role in Kargil and war on terror. He termed President Mushrraf's policies as "evil actions", quoting that he had committed grave mistakes by involving the country in Kargil, and his personal role in the War on Terror, which he was of viewed as surrendering to the U.S. threat of pushing Pakistan into the Stone Age and the armed action on the far-right Red Mosque in Islamabad. He was also critical of treatment given to the Afghan ambassador Mullah Abdul Salam Zaeef in 2001, and recommended actions against it but his advice fell on deaf ears.

== Criticism and legacy ==
After his revelation, Kiani was widely criticised by the Major General (retired) Rashid Qureshi, the spokesperson of Pervez Musharraf. Rashid Qureshi termed the charges against Musharraf as "foolish and rubbish". Major-General Qureshi had also said that General Kiani had behaved like "an angry and perturbed child" who was talking senselessly about all the favours bestowed on him. Qureshi leveled charges on him on ethicality and maintained that: "He showed sham loyalty and got promotions and lucrative appointments after retirement. On showing poor performance former Prime minister Aziz sacked him. If he was an upright person, he should have rejected appointment after retirement. Indeed, he was trying to benefit some political elements. During service he did not utter a single word against the policies of Musharraf", the Qureshi concluded."

== See also ==
- Indo-Pakistani war of 1971
- Pakistani prisoners of war in India
- Kargil war
- Movement to impeach Pervez Musharraf
