= Azhar Abbas =

Azhar Abbas may refer to:

- Azhar Abbas (cricketer) (born 1975), Pakistani cricketer
- Azhar Abbas (journalist), Pakistani journalist
- Azhar Abbas (general), Pakistani general
