= Masood Ahmed (disambiguation) =

Masood Ahmed may refer to:

- Masood Ahmed, fictional character from EastEnders
- Masood Ahmad, Indian politician
- Masood Ahmed (economist), British economist
- Masud Ahmad, Pakistani theoretical physicist
- Masud Ahmed, Bangladeshi author

== See also ==
- Maqsood Ahmad, Pakistan Army general
- Maqsood Ahmed (squash player), Pakistani squash player
- Maqsood Ahmed, Pakistani cricketer
