= 12th Infantry Division (Pakistan) =

Mountain Infantry Division

- Active: 1948- Present
- Country: Pakistan
- Branch: Pakistan Army
- Type: Division
- Size: 86,000 men (though this may vary as units are rotated)
- Part of: X Corps (Pakistan)
- Headquarters: Murree, Punjab (Pakistan)
- Nickname: Chinar Division
- Colors: Green & Red
- Engagements: Indo-Pakistani War of 1965; Indo-Pakistani War of 1971; Siachen conflict Indo-Pakistani War of 1999; War on terror

Commanders
- General Officer Commanding: Major-General Zarrar Mehmood
- Notable Commanders: Major General Ashfaq Pervez Kayani; Major General Shahid Aziz; Major General Akhtar Abdur Rehman; Major General Akhtar Hussain Malik

12th Infantry Division is a frontline formation of the Pakistani Army, headquartered in The Murree Hills Cantonment. It's deployed under X Corps and it operates under the vast expanse of the LOC. Its brigades are deployed all across Azad Jammu Kashmir and the Line of Control, starting from just short of the Kargil area to Tattapani. Its operational units total out to 6 Infantry Brigades, 1 Divisional Artillery brigade and a number of supporting units of Air Defence, Supply, Engineering, Signals and Remount & Veterinary Corps.It's the largest division of the Pakistani Army and oversees frequent skirmishes at the border.

The Division specialises in Mountain warfare, counter-insurgency, and relief operations under extreme conditions. Its Area of Responsibility includes some of the most sensitive and contested sectors such as Kel, Bagh, Rawalakot and Neelum Valley.

== History ==
The division was formed in 1948, from troops allocated to Pakistan from the old British Indian Army. It was the first division sized formation to be created by the Pakistan Army (the three prior ones, 7th (Golden Arrow), 8th and 10th infantry divisions predated Pakistan).

== 1948 Kashmir War ==
The division went into combat against the Indian army in Kashmir. A notable action was the recapturing of Skardu from the Indian forces, accomplished with help from tribesmen from the tribal areas.

== 1965 Indo-Pakistani War ==
In between the wars the division was active on the ceasefire line, where fighting broke out on several occasions. In 1965 the division undertook Operation Grand Slam, whereby under the command of 7th Infantry Division, it attacked and captured Chamb, and then moved on and captured territory beyond the river Tawi, ending up in a position 6 km ahead of Jammu. Although its performance was greatly lauded at the time, its commander Maj-Gen Akhtar Hussain Malik was privately criticised by General Ayub Khan, 5 km from LoC Indian forces, attack Haji Peer Pass and Pakistan force attack and capture Rajouri sector three months (this would not be retaken until after the ceasefire).

== 1971 Indo-Pakistani War ==
Six years later, the division went into action again, this time in Poonch-Ranjouri sector. Despite being outnumbered by Indian forces, the formation managed to advance nearly 50 km, all the way to Ranjouri. Unfortunately dogged Indian resistance meant that it was unable to capture Poonch itself. During the war, it was commanded by Maj-Gen Mohammad Akbar Khan.

== Recent history ==
Since 1971, the formation had been deployed on the Line of Control, dividing the Indian and Pakistani-administered Kashmir, where sporadic fights break out with Indian forces, and occasionally full-fledged actions develop. In 1991, the division defeated an Indian incursion into the Neelum Valley.

== List of GOCs (Commanders) ==
- Maj. Gen. Adam Khan, MC (1952)
- Maj. Gen. Sheikh Muhammad Afzal
- Maj. Gen. M Yousuf Afridi
- Maj. Gen. Shaukat Ali Shah
- Maj. Gen. (Lt. Gen.) Shahid Aziz
- Maj. Gen. (later Lt. Gen.) Attiqur Rahman
- Maj. Gen. Akhtar Hussain Malik; GOC during the 1965 Indo-Pakistani War
- Maj. Gen. Shirin Dil Khan Niazi 1966-1970
- Maj. Gen. (later Lt. Gen.) Mohammad Akbar Khan
- Maj. Gen. (later Lt. Gen.) Abdul Majeed Malik 1972-1973
- Maj. Gen. (later Gen.) Akhtar Abdur Rahman 1974-77
- Maj. Gen. Khawaja Salahuddin (1979-1981)
- Maj. Gen. (later Lt. Gen.) Zulfiqar Akhtar Naaz, HI(M), S(BT) Jan 1984 - May 1988
- Maj. Gen. Mehtab khan (Baloch Regt) (Defence Sectary Azad Kashmir)
- Maj. Gen. Zia ul Haq
- Maj. Gen. (later Lt. Gen.) Ghulam Muhammad Malik 1990-1992
- Maj. Gen. Tassaduq Hussain
- Maj. Gen. (later Lt. Gen.) Tariq Parvez 1992-1995
- Maj. Gen. M Anwar KKhan
- Maj. Gen. (later Gen.) Ashfaq Parvez Kayani, NI(M), HI(M) 1999-2001
- Maj. Gen. (Lt. Gen.) Shahid Aziz, HI(M) 2001
- Maj. Gen. (later Lt. Gen.) Waseem Ahmad Ashraf, HI(M) Oct 2001 - July 2004
- Maj. Gen. (later Lt. Gen.) Khalid Nawaz Khan, HI(M) 2004

-2006

- Maj. Gen. (later Lt. Gen.) Zaheer-ul-Islam, HI(M) 2006-2008
- Maj. Gen. (later Lt. Gen.) Maqsood Ahmad, HI(M) September 2008 - April 2010
- Maj. Gen. Sohail Ahmad Khan, HI(M) April 2010 - October 2011
- Maj. Gen. Syed Najam ul Hassan Shah, HI(M) October 2011 - July 2013
- Maj. Gen. Faheem ul Aziz July 2013 - March 2015
- Maj. Gen. Muhammad Kaleem Asif, HI(M) February 2015 – January 2017
- Maj. Gen. (later Lt. Gen.) Azhar Abbas, HI(M) January 2017 - May 2018
- Maj. Gen. (later Lt. Gen.).Amer Ahsan Nawaz, HI(M) May 2018 - December 2020
- Maj. Gen Wajid Aziz, Dec 2020 - Jan 2023
- Maj. Gen Muhammad Irfan, Punjab Regt, Jan 2023-October 2025
- Maj. Gen Zarrar Mehmood, October 2025-Incumbent
