= Mohsin Kamal (general) =

Pakistani general and civil servant (1953–2020)

- Born: 1953; Sialkot, Punjab, Pakistan
- Died: December 6, 2020; Rawalpindi, Pakistan
- Military career
- Allegiance: Pakistan
- Branch: Pakistan Army
- Service years: 1972 — 2011
- Rank: Lieutenant General
- Unit: Punjab Regiment
- Commands: Commandant Command and Staff College, Quetta; Commander Force Command Northern Areas; Commander X Corps; Military Secretary at General Headquarters
- Other work: Chairman Azad Jammu & Kashmir Public Service Commission

Mohsin Kamal (1953 – 6 December 2020) was a general in the Pakistan Army who served as Commander of X Corps and Chairman of the Azad Jammu & Kashmir Public Service Commission.

== Early life and education ==
Kamal was born in Sialkot in 1953 and received early education in Muzaffarabad. Later he joined Cadet College Hasan Abdal, and studied there until he completed his 12th. Later he joined the Pakistan Military Academy.

== Military career ==
Kamal was commissioned in 1972 in the 17th Punjab Regiment.

Throughout his career, he commanded two infantry battalions as lieutenant colonel and a brigade as brigadier general. He also served as the Chief of Staff of a corps. He was an instructor at the School of Infantry and Tactics. Later he was appointed as the CommandantCommand and Staff College, Quetta, and King Abdul Aziz Military Academy in Saudi Arabia.

In 2005, Kamal was appointed commander of the Force Command Northern Areas. In October 2007, he was promoted to lieutenant general. Following his promotion, he was appointed as the Commander X Corps.

== Later career ==
After retirement, he was appointed Chairman of the AJK Public Service Commission in December 2016. His work in the organization was praised by the then Prime Minister of Azad Kashmir.

== Death ==
Mohsin was reportedly affected by the Coronavirus. Later he died on 6 December 2020 in Rawalpindi due to the disease.
