= Malik Zafar Iqbal =

Retired senior officer of the Pakistan Army

Chairman of the Punjab Public Service Commission
- In office February 2021 – February 2024
- Preceded by: Lt Gen (Retd.) Asif Nawaz
- Succeeded by: Sohail Shahzad

Personal details
- Education: Pakistan Military Academy
- Awards: Hilal-i-Imtiaz (Military)

Military service
- Allegiance: Pakistan
- Branch/service: Pakistan Army
- Years of service: 1980 — 2019
- Rank: Lieutenant General
- Unit: 3 Baloch Regiment
- Commands: Director General Anti-Narcotics Force; Commander X Corps Rawalpindi

Malik Zafar Iqbal is a retired three-star general in the Pakistan Army. He served as Corps Commander of X Corps in Rawalpindi. Following his retirement from the military, he served as the Chairman of the Punjab Public Service Commission (PPSC).

== Military career ==
Malik Zafar Iqbal was commissioned into the Baloch Regiment in 1980.

As a major general, he has served as Director General of Anti-Narcotics Force. As a lieutenant general, he was appointed as Deputy Chief of Joint Staff and he had led foreign delegation. One of his key appointments were Corps Commander Rawalpindi, where he had led the Pakistani troops during the 2016 Indian Line of Control strike. He had reportedly claimed that the Indian casualties were higher than Pakistan's, marking Pakistan Army's professionalism during the clashes.

== Post military career ==
Following his retirement, he was appointed Chairman of the Punjab Public Service Commission in February 2021 and served until February 2024. His tenure was noted for introducing transparent reforms in the recruitment process.
