= Aftab Ahmad Khan =

Pakistan Army officer (1923–2011)

Lieutenant General Aftab Ahmad

Pakistan Ambassador to Libya
- In office 1976–1980

Pakistan Ambassador to Philippines
- In office 1984–1986

Personal details
- Born: 22 October 1923 Batala, Punjab, British India
- Died: 12 July 2011 (aged 87) Lahore, Punjab, Pakistan
- Awards: Datu of the Order of Sikatuna Großes Verdienstkreuz der Bundesrepublik Deutschland

Military service
- Allegiance: (British Raj) British India (1941–1947); Pakistan (1947–1976)
- Branch/service: British Indian Army (until 1947); Pakistan Army (from 1947)
- Years of service: 1941–1976
- Rank: Lieutenant general
- Unit: Punjab Regiment
- Commands: X Corps, Rawalpindi; VCGS
- Battles/wars: World War II; Indo-Pakistani War of 1947; Indo-Pakistani War of 1965; Indo-Pakistani War of 1971

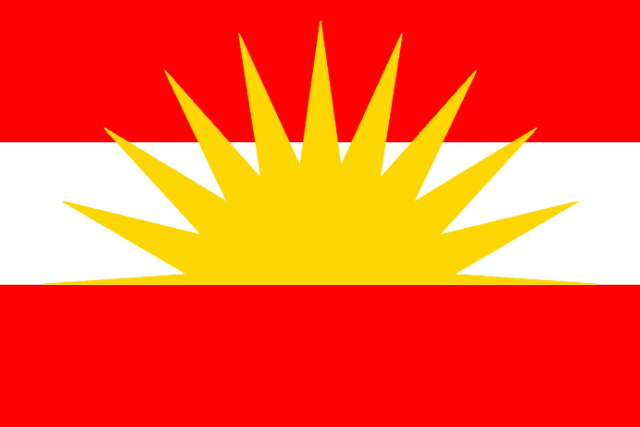
As an ode to Aftab Ahmad Khan for raising the X Corps, the Pakistan Army created an insignia for the Corps which reflected a Rising Sun (Urdu for Aftab) with ten rays extruding from it.

Aftab Ahmad Khan (22 October 1923 – 12 July 2011) was a lieutenant general in the Pakistan Army.

== Biography ==
=== Early life, military education and honours ===
Aftab Ahmad Khan was born in Batala, Gurdaspur District, British India to the family of Khan Bahadur Mian Altaf Hussain Khan (1874–1946) and Mehndi Begum. After his early education, at the Municipal Board (MB) High School Batala, he graduated from the Government College, Lahore, and joined the Indian Military Academy, Dehradun.

During his tenure in the Army, he graduated from Staff College, Quetta – 1952; the United States Army Command and Staff College, at Fort Leavenworth, USA, 1961–62; the Army War Course, Command and Staff College Quetta – 1967; and Royal College of Defence Studies (formerly known the Imperial Defence College), London – 1971.

He was Mentioned in Despatches during the 1965 India-Pakistan War, where he commanded a brigade defending the city of Lahore, Pakistan.

He was a recipient of the two gallantry awards for his work as Pakistan's ambassador in Philippines in 1984–86: Rank of Datu in the Order of Sikatuna, Government of Philippines, 8 April 1986, awarded by Corazon Aquino, President of the Republic of Philippines; and Das Großes Verdienstkreuz der Bundesrepublik Deutschland (Commander's Cross of the Order of Merit of the Federal Republic of Germany) in recognition of his exceptional services to the State and People of Germany, 9 May 1986. Both awards were awarded in recognition of the two respective governments to have facilitated the rescue of two hostages held by the Moro Islamic Liberation Front. Photographs of both Citations have been included for historical reference.

=== Military career ===
He was commissioned in the Indian Army as a 2nd lieutenant on 21 June 1942 and soon, thereafter, joined the 1st Battalion, 2nd Punjab Regiment in the British Middle East Command.

As a young officer, he served in various regimental appointments for the following two years in Egypt, Palestine, Syria and Lebanon.

In March 1944, his Battalion the 1st Battalion of 2nd Punjab, as part of the 10th Indian Division sailed for Italy and fought against the Germans in World War II as part of the British 8th Army. Major Aftab Ahmad Khan, then a company commander, returned home in December 1945.

His battalion joined the 1st Indian Parachute Division where he trained as a paratrooper and became company commander.

In 1947, when the Government of India created the Punjab Boundary Force during independence, in the position of Major served in it till it was disbanded.

Having overseen the safe evacuation of hundreds of thousands of Hindus and Sikhs from areas lying between the Sutlej and Ravi rivers to India, and was responsible to safely escort back hundreds of thousands of Muslims stranded in southern eastern Punjab province of India.

In January 1948, he was seconded from the Pakistan Army as a Major to Zhob Militia (formally known as Fort Sandeman), Quetta, Baluchistan part of the Frontier Corps for 3 ½ years and also commanded Pishin Scouts. During this time, he saw action in the state of Jammu and Kashmir.

In 1951, on posting back to the Army, he was posted first as a company commander and then a Brigade Major of an Infantry Brigade in Peshawar.

After attending the Command and Staff College, Quetta in 1952, he took command of the 14th Battalion, 1st Punjab Regiment (Pakistan) for the next 3 years.

From 1956 to 1959, he was posted as general staff officer-1 (GSO-I) in Murree serving there for 3 1/2 years. He received command of the 1st Battalion, 1st Punjab Regiment in Lahore and paraded the regiment on its 200th raising day. The parade was commanded by Lt. Col. Aftab Ahmad Khan and led by Field Marshal Sir Claude Auchinleck former commander-in-chief. The 1/1 (or commonly known as the first/first) is the most senior battalion of the Pakistan Army.

Field Marshal M. Ayub Khan at that time the (President of Pakistan) and Commander-in-Chief of the Pakistan Army took the salute at the march past.

After having been posted as colonel staff of a division, Colonel Aftab Ahmad Khan was promoted to command a brigade and fought in defence of Lahore on the Wagah border, extremely successfully in the Indo-Pakistani War of 1965.

After various staff appointments in General Headquarters, Rawalpindi, including as Vice Chief of General Staff, director general military training, research and development, he commanded a division in Chamb Sector in 1972 followed by taking command of a newly raised X Corps with the rank of lieutenant general, from where he retired after 34 years of service.

== Post-military career ==
After retirement, Aftab was sent as Ambassador of Pakistan to Libya between 1976 and 1980 and later appointed as Ambassador of Pakistan to the Philippines 1984–1986.

== Family ==
Lt. General Aftab Ahmad Khan was married to Nasreen Hayat Khan in 1960 and had a daughter Umbereen A. Khan married to Syed Fahim Inaam who have a daughter Syeda Sharmeen Inaam.

Mrs. Nasreen Aftab Khan died of a protracted illness in 2001.

He had an elder brother Professor Namdar Khan (late – died 2002), a renowned educationalist, who taught Comparative Education at University of California's School of Education (Tollman Hall) from 1972 to 1976, a younger brother Air Marshall Iftikhar Ahmad Khan, (HI)M & (SBt) Sitara-e-Basalat and two sisters Mrs. Ismat Akhtar and Mrs. Najma Chaudhury.

== Death ==
Lt. General Aftab Ahmad Khan died of a sudden Heart Attack on 12 July 2011 at the age of 88, and was laid to rest with Pakistan Army's traditional Military Honors for retired commanders.

Diplomatic posts
Preceded by Lt. Gen. Rakhman Gul	Ambassador of Pakistan to Libya; 1976–1980	Succeeded by ??
Preceded by ??	Ambassador of Pakistan to the Philippines; 1984–1986	Succeeded by ??

Military offices
Preceded by Post created	Commander X Corps; 1974–1976	Succeeded by Lt. Gen. Faiz Ali Chishti
Preceded by	GOC 23rd Infantry Division	Succeeded by
Preceded by Posted created	DG Military Training, Research & Development	Succeeded by
Preceded by	Vice Chief of General Staff	Succeeded by
