= Salahuddin Satti =

Pakistani military person

Chief of General Staff
- In office October 2006 – October 2008
- Preceded by: Tariq Majid
- Succeeded by: Muhammad Mustafa Khan

Commander X Corps Rawalpindi
- In office October 2004 – October 2006
- Preceded by: Ashfaq Parvez Kayani
- Succeeded by: Tariq Majeed

Personal details
- Born: 12 October 1951 Pakistan
- Education: Cadet College Hasan Abdal; Pakistan Military Academy; Command and Staff College Quetta; National Defence College
- Awards: Hilal-i-Imtiaz (Military); Sitara-e-Basalat

Military service
- Allegiance: Pakistan
- Branch/service: Pakistan Army
- Years of service: 1971 — 2008
- Rank: Lieutenant General
- Unit: 40 Punjab Regiment; Special Service Group
- Commands: Commander 111th Infantry Brigade; Director General Sindh Rangers; Deputy Director General Inter-Service Intelligence; Commander X Corps; Chief of General Staff

Salahuddin Satti (born 12 October 1951) is a retired general of the Pakistan Army who served as Commander of X Corps, Rawalpindi and Chief of General Staff (CGS) at the General Headquarters Rawalpindi.

== Early life and education ==
Satti was born on 12 October 1951 in Pakistan. He completed his education from Cadet College Hasan Abdal. He went to the Command and Staff College, Quetta and completed graduation from National Defence College, Islamabad. He was sent to the Turkish Armed Forces War College for further military studies.

== Military career ==
Satti was commissioned in the 47 PMA Long Course and joined the Punjab Regiment.

As a brigadier, he served as the commander of the 111th Infantry Brigade and was actively involved in the 1999 Pakistani coup d'état. Reportedly, he was a close asscociate of former President Pervez Musharraf. As a part of the Special Service Group, he served at the Siachen Glacier as Brigadier.

As a major general, he served as Director General Sindh Rangers and Deputy Director General of the Inter Service Intelligence. Later, he was promoted to the rank of lieutenant general and appointed as the Commander X Corps, a key field appointment of the Pakistan Army. Before retirement from the military, he served as Chief of the General Staff.

== Post military career ==
After retirement from the military, he served as ambassador to Brunei. Later he was appointed as the chancellor of Iqra University.
