= Shahid Imtiaz =

Three Star General of Pakistan Army

Shahid Imtiaz HI(M) SBt

Military Secretary at General Headquarters
- Incumbent
- Assumed office August 2025
- Preceded by: Lt.Gen Amer Ahsan Nawaz

Commander X Corps
- In office November 2022 – August 2025
- President: Asif Ali Zardari; Arif Alvi
- Prime Minister: Shehbaz Sharif
- Preceded by: Lt. Gen. Sahir Shamshad Mirza
- Succeeded by: Lt.Gen. Amer Ahsan Nawaz

Personal details
- Education: Officers Training School
- Awards: Hilal-e-Imtiaz; Sitara-e-Basalat

Military service
- Allegiance: Pakistan
- Branch/service: Pakistan Army
- Years of service: 1989—present
- Rank: Lieutenant General
- Unit: 19 Azad Kashmir Regiment

Shahid Imtiaz Beigh is a Pakistani Lieutenant general who is the incumbent Military Secretary of Pakistan Army. He previously served as the commander of X Corps.

== Military career ==
Shahid was commissioned in the 19 Azad Kashmir Regiment and completed the 22nd Officers Training School (OTS) course. In February 2017, he was promoted to the rank of Major General.

In March 2021, President of Pakistan Arif Alvi awarded him the Hilal-i-Imtiaz.

He has served as the Director General, Staff Duties (DGSD) at the COAS Secretariat and as GOC 23 Div, Jhelum. In October 2022, he was elevated to the rank of Lieutenant General during his tenure as Commandant of the School of Infantry and Tactics in Quetta.

Following Asim Munir's appointment as 11th Chief of the Army Staff in November 2022, Imtiaz was brought in to lead X Corps. He officially took command of X Corps later that same December.

In September 2023, there was speculation that Imtiaz would be appointed as the Director-General of Inter-Services Intelligence (DG—ISI). However, Inter-Services Public Relations (ISPR) denied these reports, labeling them as baseless. As commander X Corps, he was awarded the Sitara-e-Basalat following his engagement in 2025 India–Pakistan conflict. As per 2025, he is serving as the Military Secretary of Pakistan Army.
