= Carlos Humberto Loitey =

Uruguayan Army officer

Lieutenant General Carlos Humberto Loitey (born 1957) is an Uruguayan army officer and the United Nations Military Adviser for Peacekeeping Operations. He was appointed to this position on 22 November 2016 by United Nations Secretary-General Ban Ki-moon, replacing Lieutenant General Maqsood Ahmad of Pakistan.

== Previous appointments ==
- Defence Attaché at the Uruguayan Embassy in Washington, D.C.
- Director-General of the Uruguayan Army Branches and Services Military Institute
- Director-General of the National Support System for Peacekeeping Operations in Uruguay
- United Nations Mission in the Central African Republic and Chad (MINURCAT)

Loitey is a graduate of the Army Command and War College.
