= Balochistan Public Service Commission =

Government agency

Balochistan Public Service Commission (BPSC)
- کمیشن خدمات عامه بلوچستان

Agency overview
- Formed: 1974; 52 years ago
- Type: Commission
- Jurisdiction: Balochistan, Pakistan
- Status: Active
- Headquarters: Quetta; 30°21′04″N 67°00′39″E
- Agency executive: Ambassador (Retd) Abdul Salik Khan, Chairman
- Website: bpsc.gob.pk/BPSC/home

Balochistan Public Service Commission (BPSC) is the constitutional and statutory civil service recruiting government agency of the Balochistan province in Pakistan. It was established through an Act of the Balochistan Assembly titled "Balochistan Civil Servants Act, 1974" under Article 240 of the newly framed Constitution of Pakistan.

== Balochisan Civil Servants Act, 1974 ==
Following the foundations laid in the Article 240 of the Constitution, the Balochistan Government promulgated The Civil Servants Act, 1974. The law allows civil service of the provinces, to be regulated as per rules notified under this Act. Consequently, the Government of Balochistan has notified Civil Servants (Appointment, Transfer and Promotion) Rules, 1979 and the relevant Service Rules. The qualification and method (the way) of filling of all posts is regulated by these rules. The posts at initial officer level i.e. BS-17, are classified to be filled by way of promotion or transfer and by direct recruitment under share fixed for each category.

== BCS Exam ==
The recommendation for appointment in BS-17, under direct recruitment share, is done by BPSC through a competitive exam, which is established under its own law as a requirement of the Constitution. PCS Exam is conducted by Balochistan Public Service Commission (BPSC) includes the following two groups.

- BCS (EB) - Balochistan Civil Service (Executive Branch)
- BSS - Balochistan Secretariat Service

== See also ==
- Federal Public Service Commission
- Punjab Public Service Commission
- Sindh Public Service Commission
- Khyber Pakhtunkhwa Public Service Commission
- Azad Jammu and Kashmir Public Service Commission
