= Order of the Renaissance (Bahrain) =

Third-highest civilian award in the Kingdom of Bahrain

King Hamad Order of the Renaissance

Awarded by Bahrain
- Type: Order
- Established: 17 April 2008
- Status: Currently constituted

Precedence
- Next (higher): Order of Al-Khalifa
- Next (lower): Order of Ahmad the Conqueror
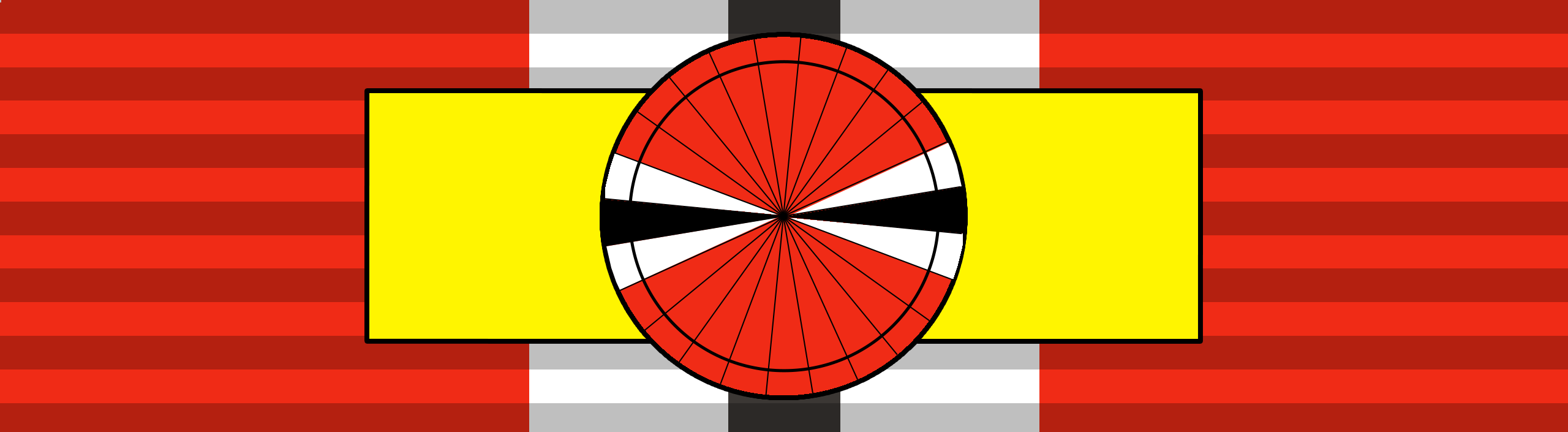
- Ribbon bar of the order

The King Hamad Order of the Renaissance is the third-highest civilian honour of Bahrain decoration named after King Hamad.

== History ==
The award was founded by King Hamad II on 17 April 2008, to recognize services towards the development of the country.

== Class ==
The King Hamad Order of the Renaissance is awarded in three classes;

- First Class – awarded to foreign leaders, prime ministers, crown princes, parliamentary chiefs, ministers or those of equal rank
- Second Class – awarded to civil servants and military personnel for contribution in the nation's development since 2001
- Third Class – awarded to those who have helped develop women's rights and human rights

King Hamad Order of the Renaissance
1st Class	2nd Class	3rd Class	4th Class	5th Class

== Recipients ==
- Khalifa bin Salman Al Khalifa, the Prime Minister of Bahrain
- Hussein, Crown Prince of Jordan (2019)
- Narendra Modi, the Prime Minister of India (2019)
- Imran Khan, the Prime Minister of Pakistan (2019)
- Qamar Javed Bajwa, the Chief of the Army Staff of Pakistan Army (2022)
- Prince Edward, Duke of Edinburgh (2024)
- Syed Asim Munir Ahmed Shah, the Chief of the Army Staff of Pakistan Army (2024)
- Khaled bin Mohamed Al Nahyan, Crown Prince of Abu Dhabi (2024)
- Shahbaz Sharif, the Prime Minister of Pakistan (2025)
- Sahir Shamshad Mirza, the Chairman Joint Chief of Staff Committee of Pakistan Armed Forces.
