= Sahir Shamshad Mirza =

18th Chairman of the Joint Chiefs of Staff Committee

Sahir Shamshad Mirza NI(C) NI(M) HI(M)
- ساحر شمشاد مرزا
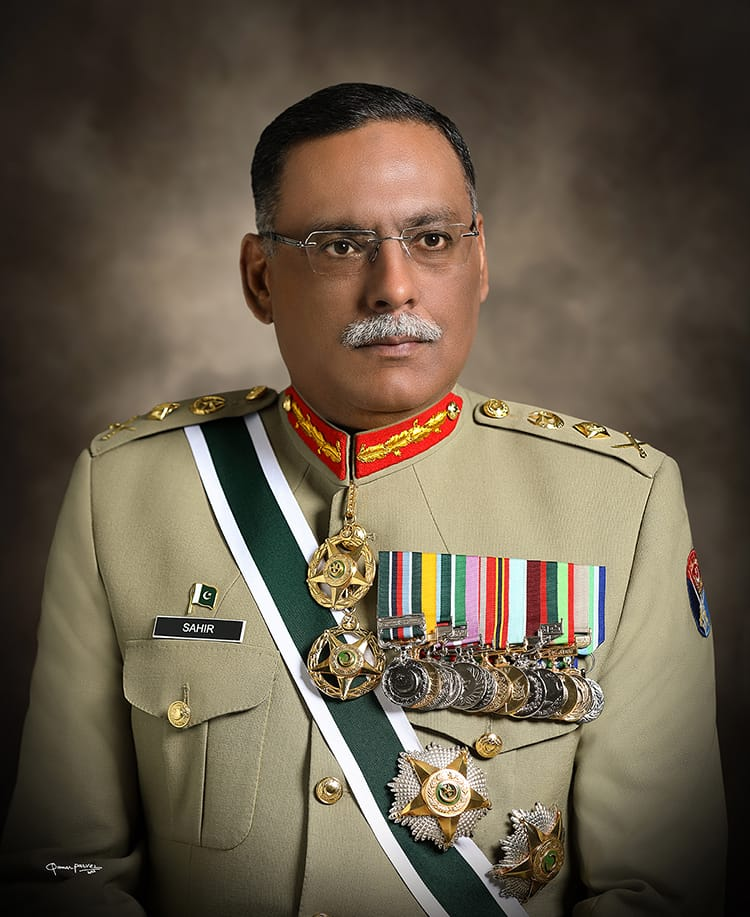

18th Chairman Joint Chiefs of Staff Committee
- In office 27 November 2022 – 27 November 2025
- President: Arif Alvi; Asif Ali Zardari
- Preceded by: General Nadeem Raza
- Succeeded by: Asim Munir (as Chief of Defence Forces)
Former Commands
Corps Commander Rawalpindi
In office 7 September 2021 – 26 November 2022
Preceded by	Azhar Abbas
Succeeded by	Shahid Imtiaz
37th Chief of General Staff
In office June 2019 – September 2021
Preceded by	Nadeem Raza
Succeeded by	Azhar Abbas
Adjutant General at GHQ
In office June 2019 – September 2019
Preceded by	Faiz Hameed
Succeeded by	Muhammad Aamer
Vice Chief of General Staff – Alpha
In office October 2018 – June 2019
Preceded by	Major General Shaheen Mazhar Mehmood
Succeeded by	Major General Muhammad Asim Malik
Director General Military Operations
In office September 2015 – October 2018
Preceded by	Major General Aamer Riaz
Succeeded by	Major General Nauman Zakaria
GOC 40th Infantry Division, D.I. Khan
In office February 2015 – 15 September 2015
Succeeded by	Major General Abid Mumtaz

Personal details
- Born: Mulhal Mughlan, Chakwal District, Pakistan
- Parent: Shamshad Mirza (father)
- Education: Pakistan Military Academy; National Defence University; Cranfield University (MSc.)
- Awards: List

Military service
- Allegiance: Pakistan
- Branch/service: Pakistan Army
- Years of service: 1987–2025
- Rank: General
- Unit: 8 Sindh Regiment
- Commands: List of Commands: X Corps; Chief of General Staff; Vice CGS - Alpha; Military Operations; 40 Infantry Division, Okara; Brigade Major of two Infantry Brigades; GSO Grade I (Plans) Pakistan Contingent UNOMSIL
- Battles/wars: Sierra Leone Civil War; Insurgency in Khyber Pakhtunkhwa; Operation Zarb-e-Azb

Sahir Shamshad Mirza NI(M) HI(M) (Urdu: ساحر شمشاد مرزا) is a retired Pakistani four star-general, who served as the last chairman Joint Chiefs of Staff Committee appointed to the post on 27 November 2022 for a three year term. Prior to this appointment, he commanded the Rawalpindi Northern Command from 2021 to 2022. He was a well decorated officer in the army, being awarded Nishan-e-Imtiaz both civilian and military.

== Early life and education ==
Sahir was born to Shamshad Mirza in Mulhal Mughlan, a small village located in Chakwal District, Punjab. Sahir was orphaned at a young age. He graduated from the Pakistan Military Academy, Command and Staff College, Quetta and National Defence University, Pakistan. He also received his M.Sc. degree in Global Security from Cranfield University, United Kingdom.

== Military career ==
Sahir was commissioned into the 8th Sind Regiment of the Pakistan Army after completing the 76th Pakistan Military Academy course on 10 September 1987. He has held commands such as adjutant general at the GHQ, Commander X Corps and Director General and G1M06 at the Military Operations Directorate. During his assignment at Military Operations, he commanded 40th Infantry Division in Okara.

== Political views ==
=== Regional stability and strategic balance ===
Sahir had consistently advocated for strategic stability in South Asia and the broader Asia-Pacific region. Speaking at the Shangri-La Dialogue in Singapore, he emphasized that enduring peace requires trust, mutual recognition of red lines, and inclusive crisis management mechanisms. He warned that attempts to build regional security architectures without trust or equal participation are inherently flawed.

=== Kashmir dispute ===
Highlighting the fragile security environment in South Asia, Sahir identified unresolved disputes such as Kashmir, deteriorating India-Pakistan-China relations, and Afghanistan’s instability as major flashpoints. He cautioned that the nuclearization of the region has heightened the risk of miscalculation, and called for the restoration of functional communication channels between rival states.

He reiterated Pakistan’s long-standing position on Kashmir, advocating for a resolution aligned with United Nations Security Council resolutions and the will of the Kashmiri people.

== Awards and honours ==
On 8 December 2022, Sahir received the Nishan-e-Imtiaz (military) award alongside COAS Asim Munir from Arif Alvi at the Aiwan-e-Sadr. The top military officials were given the awards in front of Prime Minister of Pakistan, diplomats, lawmakers, and federal ministers.

== Publications ==
- Lieutenant Colonel Sahir Shamshad Mirza, “Subcontinental Security and Its Impact on World Security: Challenges and the Way Forward”, NDU Journal, 2009.

== Effective dates of promotion ==
Insignia	Rank	Date
	General	Nov 2022
	Lieutenant General	April 2019
	Major General	February 2015
	Brigadier	September 2012
	Lieutenant Colonel	April 2002
	Major	May 1996
	Captain	April 1991
	Lieutenant	October 1989
	Second Lieutenant	October 1987

== Awards and decorations ==

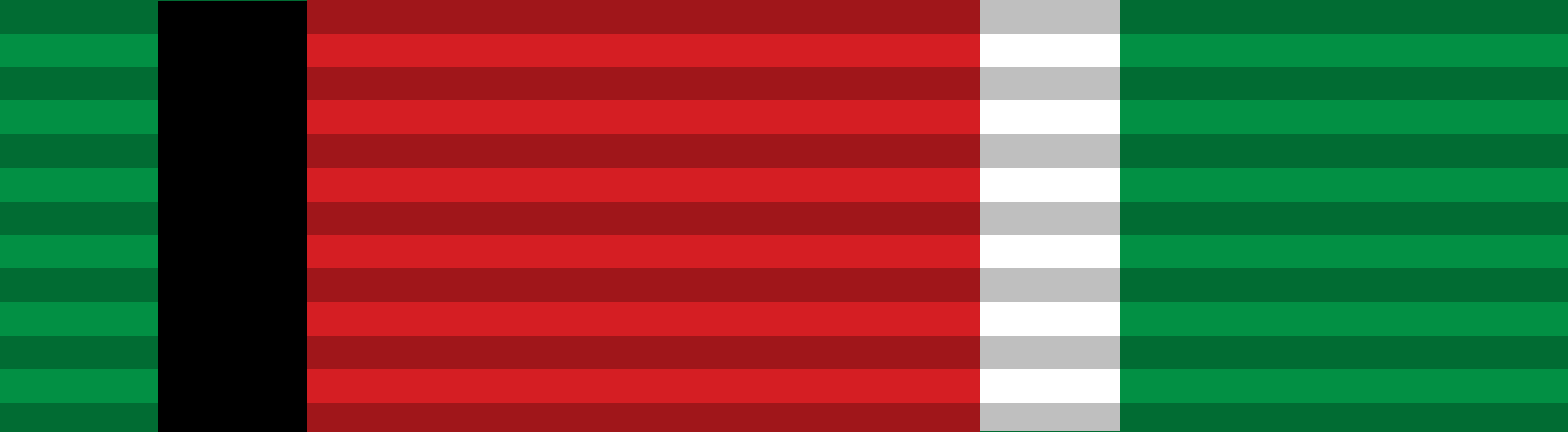

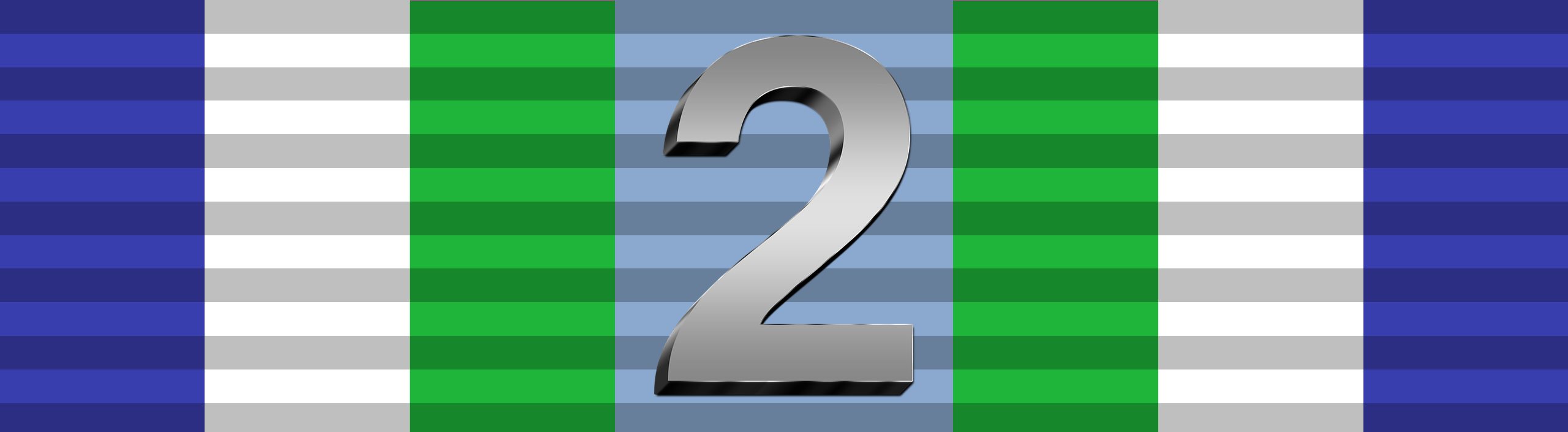

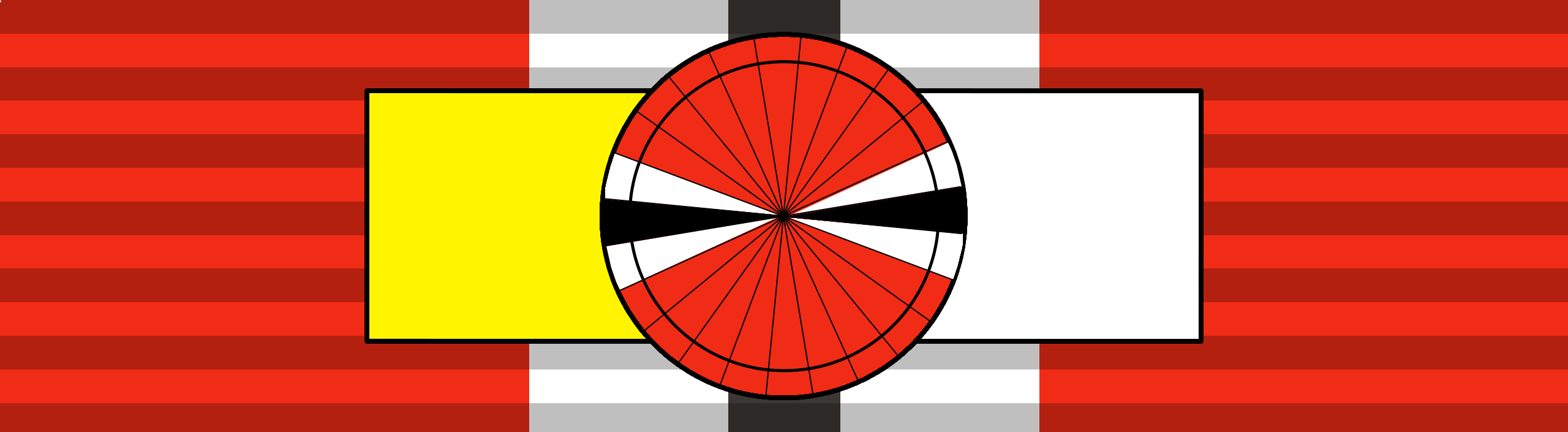

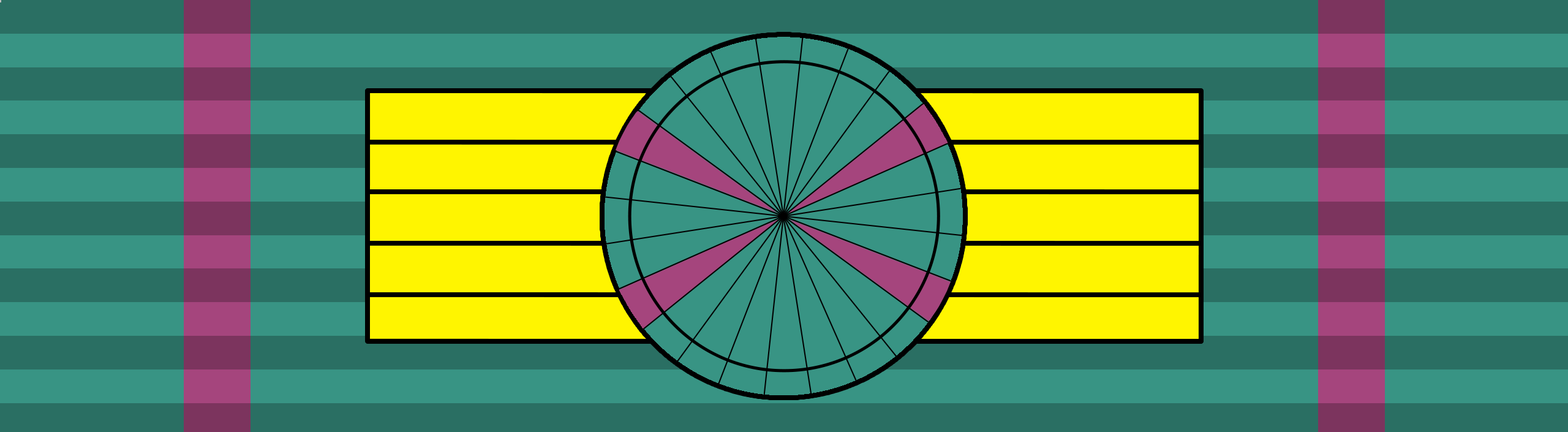

Nishan-e-Imtiaz (Military) (Order of Excellence) (2022)		Nishan-e-Imtiaz (Civilian) (Order of Excellence) (2025)	
Hilal-e-Imtiaz (Military) (Crescent of Excellence) (2018)	Tamgha-e-Diffa (General Service Medal) Siachen Glacier Clasp	Tamgha-e-Baqa (Nuclear Test Medal) 1998	Tamgha-e-Istaqlal Pakistan (Escalation with India Medal) 2002
Tamgha-e-Azm (Medal of Conviction) (2018)	10 Years Service Medal	20 Years Service Medal	30 Years Service Medal
35 Years Service Medal	Jamhuriat Tamgha (Democracy Medal) 1988	Qarardad-e-Pakistan Tamgha (Resolution Day Nishan e Haider Golden Jubilee Medal) 1990	Tamgha-e-Salgirah Pakistan (Independence Day Golden Jubilee Medal) 1997
Command & Staff College Quetta Instructor's Medal	United Nations UNOMSIL Medal (2 Deployments)	The Order of Bahrain 2nd Class (Bahrain) (2021)	Order of the Star of Jordan (1st class) (Jordan) (2023)
Order of King Abdul Aziz (1st Class) (Saudi Arabia) (2025)			

=== Foreign decorations ===
Foreign Awards
United Nations	UNOMSIL Medal
Bahrain	The Order of Bahrain (2nd Class)
Jordan	Order of the Star of Jordan (1st Class)
Kingdom of Saudi Arabia	Order of King Abdul Aziz (1st Class)
