= X Corps (Pakistan) =

Pakistan Army's field maneuver strike corps

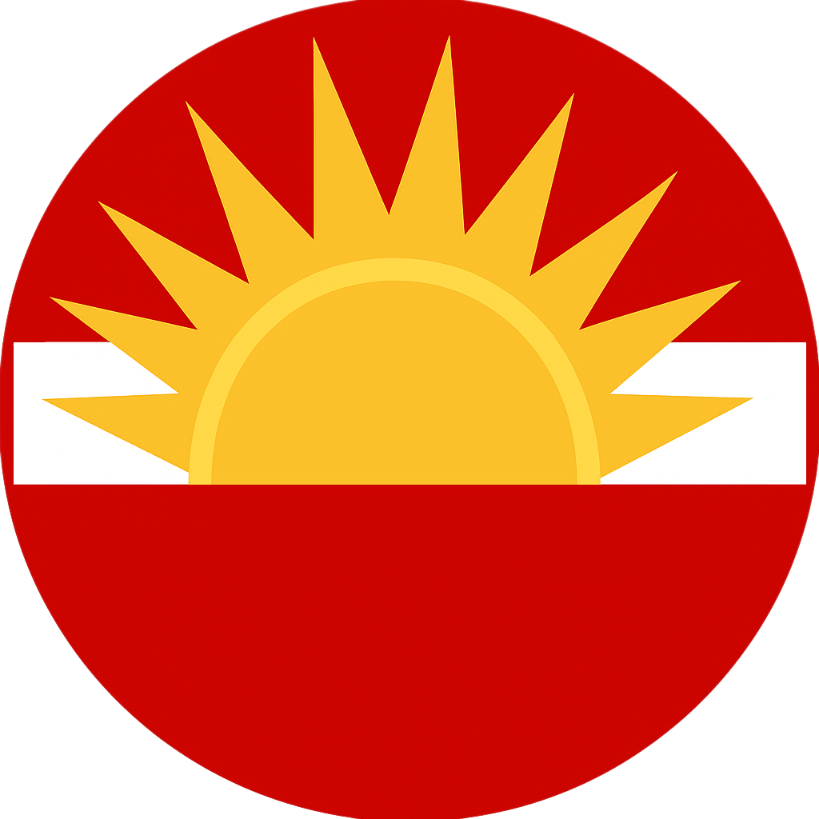
- Logo of X Corps
- Active: 1974; 52 years ago
- Country: Pakistan
- Branch: Pakistan Army
- Type: XXX Corps
- Role: Maneuver/Deployment oversight
- Size: ~200,000 approximately (Though this may vary as units are rotated)
- HQ/Garrison: Chaklala Cantonment, Punjab, Pakistan
- Nicknames: The Pindi Corps; Rawalpindi Corps; Northern Command'
- Colors Identification: Red, white and yellow
- Anniversaries: 1974
- Engagements: Indo-Pakistani wars and conflicts: Siachen conflict; Kargil conflict; Military standoffs with India: 2002 Indo-Pakistani standoff; 2008 Indo-Pakistani standoff; India–Pakistan border skirmishes: Skirmishes in 2011; Skirmishes in 2013; Skirmishes in 2014; Skirmishes in 2016-18; 2016 Indian Line of Control strike; Skirmishes in 2019; Skirmishes in 2020-21; Taliban insurgency in Khyber-Pakhtunkhwa: Operation Black Thunderstorm; Operation Rah-e-Rast; Operation Zarb-e-Azb; Operation Radd-ul-Fasaad
- Decorations: Military Decorations of Pakistan military

Commanders
- Commander: Lt-Gen. Amer Ahsan Nawaz
- Chief of Staff: Brig. Zeeshan

Insignia
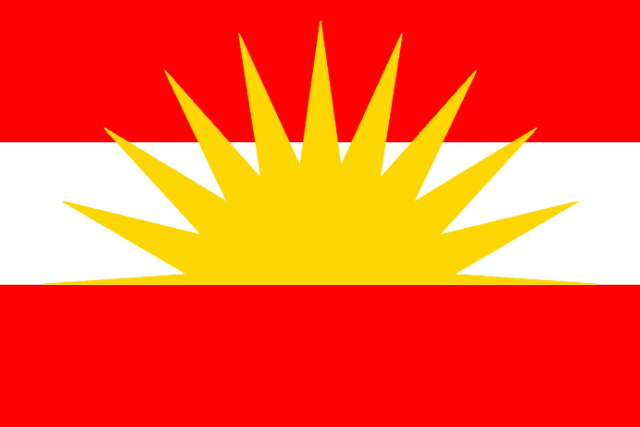
- War Flag

The X Corps is a field corps of Pakistan Army, currently headquartered in Chaklala Cantonment, Punjab, Pakistan. Together with the I Corps, it has an area of responsibility to protect the Kashmir region— the side only which Pakistan administrates.

Badge of the Corps

With army reserves, paramilitary, and assigned to protect the presidency, the X Corps forms and leads an important formation in Pakistan's security spectrum, which is known as Northern Command.

It is currently commanded by its commander, Lt-Gen. Amer Ahsan Nawaz.

== History ==
=== Formation and war service ===
After the 1971 conflict with India, the Pakistani military had to modify its organizational structure to meet parity with Indian Army. This eventually led to the establishing of the X Corps with Lieutenant-General Aftab Ahmad Khan becoming its first commander, with its headquarters in Chaklala Cantonment near Rawalpindi in 1974.

Unlike the I Corps, the X Corps has an area of expertise in winter and mountain warfare, and oversees security operations together with the local law enforcement, mountain divisions guarding the nation's mountain ranges, and paramilitary to ensure the national defenses of the Pakistan. By accumulating all the military elements, the X Corps leads a regional formation to ensure the defenses and national security under a command known as "Northern Command".

The north–south regional formation, with X Corps leading the Northern Command, was formed by the Army GHQ working under then-army chief Gen. Ashfaq Pervez, only to address the Indian Army's Cold Start strategy.

Its badge insignia, as an ode to Lt-Gen. Aftab Ahmad Khan, the insignia of the X Corps features a Rising Sun or Aftab (in Urdu) with 10 rays extruding from it. Due to its deployment in sensitive border areas and mission parameters to prevent Indian Army's adventures in northern fronts, the X Corps has seen more military actions against the Indian Army than any of Pakistan's maneuver corps deployed in other fronts.

=== Serving on the Line of Control ===
Since its deployment in 1974, the X Corps has faced the Indian Army across the Line of Control (LoC) and northern frontiers of Pakistan's borders. The X Corps has fought battles in Siachen conflict in 1984 and a border war with India in 1999.

Since 1974, its primary mission has been to prevent and mitigate the threats of Indian Army's advancement in northern frontiers of Pakistan.

Currently, Mujahid Force is mainly responsible for protecting and serving of Line of Control. Mujahid Force constituents of 29 units, Most of them serving in Azad Kashmir premises and some other areas of X Corps region. Currently, Brig. Tahir Ali Syed is serving as Director Mujahid Force and Lt. Gen Shahid Imtiaz is serving as the current Commandant Mujahid Force.

== Structure ==
The X Corps oversees the operational control and command of the Force Command Northern Areas (a mountain warfare division), Mujahid Force, a reservist unit of the Army National Guards, and others battalions of the special forces.

The X Corps structure is composed of five infantry division and one brigade of each of infantry brigade, armored, artillery, signal, and an engineering brigade.

Additional reinforcement to provide support to X Corps comes from the other mountain divisions of the XI Corps, batteries of Army Air Defence Command, the Air Force's Northern Air Command and Navy's Northern Command that also includes the Pakistan Marines several battalions; it forms the joint military formation, known as Northern Command, which the X Corps leads to enforce national defenses of Pakistan on the northern front.

Under the statue of Northern Command, the X Corps provides military support to civil armed forces and provincial governments in the northern fronts while protecting the territory and national interests of the Pakistan within the country.

Corps X Commander, Rawalpindi, Punjab
Lt.Gen Amer Ahsan Nawaz
Structure
Assigned Units	Unit Badge	Unit HQ
12th Infantry Division		Murree, Punjab
19th Reserve Infantry Division		Mangla, Azad Kashmir
23rd Infantry Division		Jhelum, Punjab
Force Command Northern Areas		Gilgit
34th Light Infantry Division		Chilas
111th Infantry Brigade		Rawalpindi, Punjab
8th Independent Armoured Brigade		Khairan, Punjab
Independent Artillery Brigade		U/I Location
Independent Air Defence Brigade		U/I Location
Independent Signal Brigade		U/I Location
Independent Engineering Brigade		U/I Location

== List of commanders ==
#	Name	Start of tenure	End of tenure
1	Lt Gen Aftab Ahmad Khan	March 1973	March 1976
2	Lt Gen Faiz Ali Chishti	March 1976	March 1980
3	Lt Gen Jahan Dad Khan	March 1980	April 1984
4	Lt Gen Zahid Ali Akbar Khan	April 1984	May 1987
5	Lt Gen Imran Ullah Khan	May 1987	June 1991
6	Lt Gen Ghulam Muhammad Malik	June 1991	October 1995
7	Lt Gen Ali Kuli Khan Khattak	October 1995	May 1997
8	Lt Gen Saleem Haider	May 1997	October 1998
9	Lt Gen Mahmud Ahmed	October 1998	October 1999
10	Lt Gen Jamshed Gulzar Kiani	November 1999	October 2001
11	Lt Gen Syed Arif Hassan	October 2001	October 2003
12	Lt Gen Ashfaq Parvez Kayani	October 2003	August 2004
13	Lt Gen Salahuddin Satti	October 2004	November 2006
14	Lt Gen Tariq Majid	November 2006	October 2007
15	Lt Gen Mohsin Kamal	October 2007	October 2008
16	Lt Gen Tahir Mahmud	October 2008	May 2010
17	Lt Gen Khalid Nawaz Khan	May 2010	August 2013
18	Lt Gen Qamar Javed Bajwa	August 2013	October 2015
19	Lt Gen Malik Zafar Iqbal	October 2015	December 2016
20	Lt Gen Nadeem Raza	December 2016	September 2018
22	Lt Gen Bilal Akbar	September 2018	September 2019
23	Lt Gen Azhar Abbas	September 2019	September 2021
24	Lt Gen Sahir Shamshad Mirza	September 2021	November 2022
25	Lt Gen Shahid Imtiaz	November 2022	September 2025
26	Lt Gen Amer Ahsan Nawaz	September 2025	Incumbent
