= Sindh Public Service Commission =

Recruitment agency of state government of Pakistan

- سنڌ عوامي خدمت ڪميشن

Agency overview
- Formed: 1926 (first established as British Indian Civil Service)
- Jurisdiction: Government of Sindh
- Headquarters: Hyderabad, Sindh, Pakistan
- Agency executives: Rizwan Ahmed (Chairman); Qazi Shahid Pervez (Member); Saeed Mangnejo (Member); Mohsin Mushtaq Chandna (Member); Nazir Quershi (Secretary)
- Website: spsc.gos.pk

The Sindh Public Service Commission is a constitutional and statutory provincial agency of Government of Sindh that is responsible for recruiting civil servants and bureaucrats in the province of Sindh, Pakistan. The current Chairman SPSC is Rizwan Ahmed, in office since 13 June 2026.

== History ==
The Public Service Commission was set up for the first time in British India in 1926. After independence, the commission was established in Pakistan in 1947. At present, the commission is functioning under Article 242 of the Constitution of Pakistan. It has been provided autonomy under the Rules of Business, 1973 and FPSC Regulations, 1978 in its working. The commission has also been given administrative as well as, to some extent, financial autonomy to perform its functions independently.

The commission consists of a chairman and members. The chairman is appointed by the Governor of Sindh where as the members are appointed by the Chief Minister of Sindh. The commission is assisted by the secretary who provides a link among the commission, its secretariat and the government agencies.

== Powers and responsibilities ==
The commission has the power to select and appoint, based on performances in the Provincial Service Commission Exams, officers to various posts in various departments across the province of Sindh. They conduct written examinations followed by interviews.

== Objectives ==
- To establish a competent, efficient, professional and responsive Public Service to meet the challenges of the twenty-first century.
- To act without fear or favor ensuring functional independence, political neutrality, accountability and integrity.
- To uphold standards, policies, guidelines and rules governing selection processes.
- To develop and implement rule-based selection criteria and processes to ensure fair and equal-opportunity to all candidates.
- To render advice to the Government, where necessary, on policies, methods of recruitment, selection criteria and processes, to ensure efficient selection process and to attract best possible human resource for various posts.

== See also ==
- Federal Public Service Commission
- Punjab Public Service Commission
- Khyber Pakhtunkhwa Public Service Commission
- Balochistan Public Service Commission
- Azad Jammu and Kashmir Public Service Commission
