= Amer Ahsan Nawaz =

Pakistan army officer

Commander X Corps
- Incumbent
- Assumed office August 2025
- Preceded by: Lt. Gen. Shahid Imtiaz

Personal details
- Education: Pakistan Military Academy; Command and Staff College Quetta
- Awards: Hilal-i-Imtiaz

Military service
- Allegiance: Pakistan
- Branch/service: Pakistan Army
- Years of service: 1990 — present
- Rank: Lieutenant General
- Unit: 3 Baloch Regiment
- Commands: X Corps; 12th Infantry Division; Commandant Command and Staff College Quetta

Amer Ahsan Nawaz is a three star officer of the Pakistan Army currently serving as the Commander X Corps. Amer Nawaz previously held the position of Military Secretary at GHQ Rawalpindi, a position he assumed on 20 September 2023.

== Military career ==
Amer Ahsan Nawaz was commissioned in the 3 Baloch Regiment in 1990, after graduating from the 82nd PMA Long Course. He is a graduate of the Command and Staff College, Quetta, National Defence University, Islamabad and the Command and General Staff College, Fort Leavenworth.

As a Major, Amer has written a master thesis for the Faculty of the U.S. Army Command and General Staff College as part of his course on the Master of Art and Science. His thesis was titled Leader Development Process in Pakistan Army at the Tactical Level, in 2004.

Amer has commanded his parent unit, served as the Brigade Major (BM) of an Infantry Brigade and as Chief of Staff XI Corps. He has also served on the faculty of different military educational institutes of Pakistan.

Amer was appointed as the GOC of the 12th Infantry Division, Murree upon his promotion as a two-star General. Later Major-general Amer Ahsan Nawaz was appointed the Commandant of the Command and Staff College, Quetta. Major-general Amer is accredited of updating the academic curriculum to include subjects like the role of Artificial Intelligence, Cyber Warfare, Hybrid Warfare and Algorithmic Warfare in future wars. Upon his promotion as Lieutenant General in 2023, Amer Ahsan Nawaz was appointed as a Military Secretary, at the GHQ. As Military Secretary, he oversaw the internal affairs of the military, such as promotion, posting and career management of the officers and others. Lieutenant General Amer Ahsan Nawaz has been serving as the Commander of X Corps since 2025.

== Family ==
Amer is the son of Khalid Nawaz Malik, a retired three star general of the Pakistan Army who has served as Corps Commander, XXXI Corps, and Military Secretary at the GHQ. He was one of the names considered for promotion to the position of Chief of Army Staff (COAS) following the resignation of then Army Chief General Jahangir Karamat.

== Publications ==
Leader Development Process in Pakistan Army at the Tactical Level 2004, by Major Amer Ahsan Nawaz.
