= Khyber Pakhtunkhwa Public Service Commission =

Government agency responsible for recruitment of civil services

- KPPSC د خیبر پښتونخوا د عامه خدماتو کمیسیون

Agency overview
- Jurisdiction: Government of Khyber Pakhtunkhwa
- Headquarters: Peshawar, Pakistan
- Agency executive: Captain(R) Munir Azam, (Chairman)
- Website: www.kppsc.gov.pk

Khyber Pakhtunkhwa Public Service Commission (KPPSC) is a constitutional and statutory agency of Government of Khyber Pakhtunkhwa that is responsible for recruiting civil servants and bureaucrats. The Public Service Commission was evolved under the British India act 1935. Meanwhile, the KP public service Commission (KPPSC) is functional under the ordinance of KPK PSC 1978.

Captain(R) Munir Azam, who served as a federal secretary, is currently serving as the Chairman of the commission since February 2025.

== See also ==
- Federal Public Service Commission
- Punjab Public Service Commission
- Sindh Public Service Commission
- Balochistan Public Service Commission
- Azad Jammu and Kashmir Public Service Commission
