= Anti-Narcotics Force =

Federal executive bureau of Pakistan

Anti Narcotics Force انسدادِ منشیات فورس
- Anti-Narcotics Force Logo
- Abbreviation: ANF
- Motto: Drugs Free Pakistan

Agency overview
- Formed: 21 February 1995; 31 years ago

Jurisdictional structure
- Operations jurisdiction: Pakistan
- Specialist jurisdiction: Paramilitary law enforcement, counter insurgency, riot control

Operational structure
- Headquarters: Wavel lines, Chaklala Cantt, Rawalpindi, Pakistan
- Agency executive: Major-General Abdul Moeed, Director General
- Parent agency: Ministry of Interior and Narcotics Control

Website
- www.anf.gov.pk

The Anti-Narcotics Force (Urdu: انسدادِ منشیات فورس, romanized: insidād-e-munaśśiyāt fors, reporting name: ANF) is a federal executive bureau and a paramilitary force of the Government of Pakistan, tasked with combating the narcotics smuggling and use within Pakistan. ANF works under the umbrella of Pakistan Army and Ministry of Interior and Narcotics Control (Pakistan) of which Mohsin Raza Naqvi is the minister since March 2024. Currently, a two-star Army Officer, Major general Abdul Moeed is deputed as Director-General. The ANF also has sole responsibility for coordinating and pursuing Pakistan narcotics investigations abroad.

The force is led by the officers of the Pakistan Army and Police Service of Pakistan.

The superintendence of the Force is a vest with the Federal Government whereas, administration of the Force is vested with the Director-General who shall exercise in respect of the Force all powers of an Inspector-General of Police under the Police Act, 1861 (V of 1861), and all other powers under the Act. In case of any officers and members from the Armed Forces, the Director-General shall have all powers conferred by or under the Pakistan Army Act, 1952 (XXXIX of 1952), the Pakistan Air Force Act, 1953 (VI op 1953), and the Pakistan Navy Ordinance, 1961 (XXXVI of 1961), respectively as an officer empowered to convene a General Court Martial. The Force consists of approximately 3100 agents across the country.

The organization has sacrificed 16 of its enforcers including offices, JCOs, and Jawans.

On 11 February 2025, ANF was separated from the Ministry of Narcotics Control and attached with the Ministry of Interior.

== ANF Setup ==
Anti Narcotics Force Headquarters is situated at Rawalpindi controlling its outfits through 5x Regional Headquarters i.e. North at Rawalpindi, KP at Peshawar, Punjab at Lahore, Sindh at Karachi, and Balochistan at Quetta. Regional Headquarters are controlling their area of the domain through their various Police Stations. There are 9x Directorates at HQ ANF:

- Logistics Directorate
- Enforcement Directorate (A, B, and I Branches)
- Law Directorate
- Assets and Financial Investigation Directorate
- Planning & Development Directorate
- International Cooperation Directorate
- Information Technology Directorate
- Drug Demand Reduction Directorate
- General Staff
- Aviation Branch

== Association of other Institutions regarding Anti Narcotics and Anti Smuggling ==
To protect Pakistan's National Security, the Anti-Narcotics Force under the insight of the Ministry of Narcotics Control is works in co-ordination with other Law Enforcement Agencies of Pakistan. Such as:

- Pakistan Coast Guards
- Pakistan Customs
- Provincial Excise
- Frontier Corps (KP and Balochistan)
- Federal Constabulary
- Pakistan Rangers (Punjab and Sindh)
- Provincial and territorial police Police (KP, Punjab, Sindh, GB, AJK, and Balochistan)
- Airports Security Force (At Airports, ASF helps ANF to counter the drugs smuggling threats at large scale)
- Maritime Security Agency
- National Highways & Motorway Police
- Gilgit Baltistan Scouts
- Intelligence Bureau

== History ==
Pakistan Narcotics Board (PNB) was set up in 1957, in the Revenue Division in order to meet Pakistan's obligations under the International Opium Convention of 1925. PNB comprised representatives from the Provincial Governments and some Federal Ministries/Divisions.

Pakistan Narcotics Control Board (PNCB) was established in 1973 with five Regional Directorates, in response to UN Convention on Narcotics Control, with the mandate to combat narcotics in the Country. PNCB functioned as an attached department of the Ministry of Interior until 1989 with the strength of 883 all ranks. Narcotics Control Division (NCD) was established in 1989 and the Board became its attached department.

Anti Narcotics Task Force (ANTF) comprising 388 all ranks from Pakistan Army was established in December 1991 as an attached department of NCD.

Anti Narcotics Force (ANF) was raised on 21 February 1995 by merging PNCB and ANTF.

Narcotics Control Division (NCD) was declared Ministry of Narcotics Control in 2001 but it was reverted to NCD under Ministry of Interior and Narcotics Control (MOI&NC) in 2013.

Ministry of Narcotics Control (MNC) Ministry of Narcotics Control was established in August 2017.

== ANF Intelligence and Investigation ==
There are distinct stages for Investigating a case.

=== Stages ===
Assets of the convicts in narcotics cases are confiscated in favor of the Federal Government through the following stages usually:

- Tracing: Finding out the true sources, disposition, movement or ownership of assets and includes determining the movement or conversion of assets by any means.
- Freezing: Prohibiting by an order made by the Special Court or an officer authorized under CNS Act 1997 the transfer, conversion, disposal or movement of any assets and includes the holding, controlling, assuming custody or managing any assets in pursuance of such order and, in the case of assets which are perishable the disposal thereof
- Forfeiture: Forfeiting of asset /property in favor of Federal Government.
- Realization: On finalization of forfeiture of assets and execution petition, the assets are realized in favor of the Federal Government.

=== Laws ===
Assets Investigation is conducted under relevant sections/provisions provided by the following laws:

- Control of Narcotics Substance Act, 1997
- Anti Narcotics Force Act, 1997
- Code of Criminal Procedure, 1898
- Anti Money Laundering Act, 2010
- Prevention of Smuggling Act, 1977

=== The Operations ===
According to activities of smugglers and areas which facilitate their interest, the operations of the Anti-Narcotics force can be divided into the following three categories:

- Anti Narcotics, Arms and Ammunition
- Anti Explosive Chemicals
- Anti Money Laundering

== Policy Review Board ==
To monitor the policies of the Federal Government a Policy Review Board headed by the Minister for Narcotics Control comprising 14 members from relevant Federal and Provincial Ministries was set up in 1997. A separate ministry for Narcotics Control has been set up; therefore, there is a need to revise the composition of this body. The existing composition of the Policy Review Board is as follows

Minister for Narcotics Control	Chairman
Minister for Health and Social Welfare	Member
Minister for Foreign Affairs	Member
Minister of Kashmir Affairs, Gilgit-Baltistan	Member
Governor KP	Member
4 Ministers in charge of Provincial Home Departments	Member
4 Ministers in charge of Provincial Health Departments	Member
Minister for Narcotics Control (NWFP)	Member
Secretary Ministry of Narcotics Control	Secretary/Member

== Narcotics Interdiction Committee ==
To make the coordinating role of the Federal Government effective and to ensure that narcotics interdiction by various law enforcement agencies proceeds under well-synchronized efforts, a Narcotics Interdiction Committee (NIC) has been set up with the following composition:

Secretary Narcotics Control Division	Chairman
Inspector Generals of Police Punjab, Sindh, NWFP Balochistan, AJK, Islamabad Capital Territory and Northern Areas	Member
Heads of Federal Civil Armed Forces	Member
Director General, Federal Investigation Agency (FIA)	Member
Director General, Intelligence and Investigation (Customs and Excise), Revenue Division	Member
Director General of the Anti Narcotics Force(ANF)	Member

== ANF's Charter of Duty ==
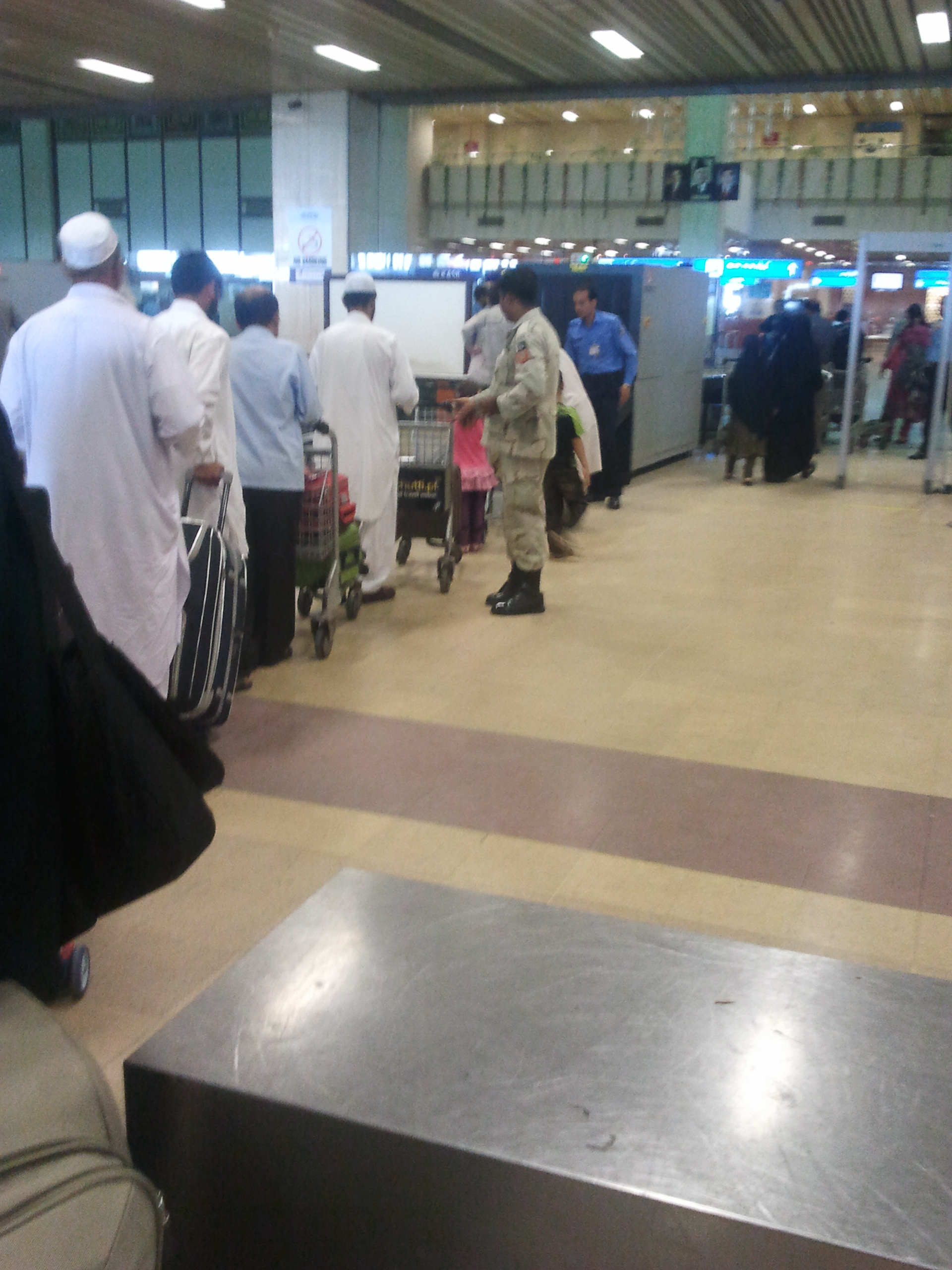
ANF official checking passengers at Jinnah International Airport

Anti Narcotics Force (ANF) is responsible to perform the following

Supply Reduction

Limiting the smuggling trafficking and distribution of Narcotics. Coordinating eradication of opium poppy. Ensuring no heroin lab becomes functional. Inquire/Investigate assets of drug barons. Pursuing Legal cases relentlessly.

Demand Reduction

Reducing the demand for illicit drugs through preventive education, treatment, and rehabilitation as well as harm reduction programs.

Coordination Liaison at National and International Level

Enhancing international co-operation in the fight against drugs and liaison with the United Nations Office on Drugs and Crime, International Narcotics Control Board, International Police, Narcotics Affairs Section (US Embassy), Drugs Enforcement Agency, Foreign Anti Narcotics Community, Drug Liaison Officers, etc.

External videos
- On patrol with Pakistan's anti-narcotics force

Assets Performance, 2016
Month / Year	Frozen (Rs. In Million)	Forfeited (Rs. in Million)	Realized (Amount deposited in National Bank)
Jun 2016	Rs. 92.39 Million	–	–
May 2016	Rs. 43.286048 Million	–	–
Apr 2016	Rs. 209.552919 Million	–	–
Mar 2016	Rs. 6.95 Million	–	–
Feb 2016	Rs. 49.37105 Million	–	–
Jan 2016	Rs. 72.05 Million	–	–

National Seizure Data– 2016 (ANF and Other Law Enforcement Agencies

Category	Numerical
No of Cases Registered	54990
Persons Arrested	58933
Opium (Kg)	64608.316
Morphine (Kg)	6595.822
Heroin (Kg)	23172.189
Hashish (Kg)	270493.906
Cocaine (Kg)	231.373
Amphetamine (Kg)	3876.597
Methamphetamine (Kg)	132.505
Ecstasy Tabs (No)	1230.000
Xnax Tabs (No)	31960.000
Rovitaril Tab (No)	280.000
Metami Zole (No)	550.000
Poppy Straw (Kg)	1022.579
Cannabis/Marijuana (Kg)	17067.650
Acetic Anhydride (Kg)	44454.000
Sulphuric Acid (Kg)	2835.000
Total Narcotics (Metric Tons)	434.490
Domestic Price (PKR Million)	31723.410
International Price (US$ Million)	6021.450

== SPEAR Strategy ==
ANF has organized a strategy which is recognized as SPEAR. The inscription details are as under:

Surveillance and Intelligence Acquisition

Proactive Prevention and Protection

Effective Enforcement

Alliances, Assistance and Cooperation

Rehabilitation and Awareness

== International Initiatives ==
To make joint efforts for the control of drug trafficking, the agency in collaboration with the Government of Pakistan has signed MoUs with 32 countries and Letters of Intent with 2 × countries. Moreover, 15 × new MoUs and revisions for 5 × existing MoUs are also under process. Additionally, specific treaties have been signed with 29 × countries for the extradition of convicts on certain offenses including drug trafficking. Details of these agreements are as under:

=== Memorandum of Understanding (MOUs) ===
Afghanistan, Australia, Azerbaijan, Brazil, Brunei, Egypt, Hellenic Republic (Greece), India, Indonesia, Iran, Italy, Kazakhstan, Kingdom of Cambodia, Kuwait, Kyrgyzstan, Lao People's Democratic, Maldives, Nigeria, Republic of Philippines, Romania, Russia, Singapore, Sri Lanka, Syria, Tajikistan, Thailand, Turkey, UAE, United Kingdom, United States and Uzbekistan

=== Under Process MoUs ===
Bahrain, Canada, Kenya, Libya, Malaysia, Malta, Mauritius, Nepal, Oman, Saudi Arabia, Seychelles, South Africa, Turkmenistan and Ukraine.

=== Letter of Intent (LoI) ===
Australia and China

=== Extradition Treaties ===
Argentina, Belgium, France, Greece, Switzerland, United States, Iran, Monaco, Netherlands, Denmark, Austria, Yugoslavia, Iraq, Ecuador, Portugal, Luxembourg, Colombia, Liberia, Cuba, San Marino, Italy, Egypt, Australia, Uzbekistan, Algeria, China, UAE, Libya and Kuwait.

== World Anti-Narcotics Day ==
UNODC observes 26 June as the "INTERNATIONAL DAY AGAINST DRUG ABUSE AND ILLICIT TRAFFICKING", established by the UN General Assembly in 1987. This observance manifests to further escalate the UN's resolve in creating a drug-free society by reducing both demands as well as the supply of illicit drugs and increasing awareness among the general masses regarding drug abuse. Each Year UNODC selects themes for International Drug Day and launches campaigns to raise public appreciation regarding the global drug issue and its effects on complete humanity. Past Observance themes for the last 5 years were:

- 2015: "Let's Develop — Our Lives — Our Communities — Our Identities — Without Drugs"
- 2014: "A message of hope: Drug use disorders are preventable and treatable"
- 2013: "Make health your 'new high' in life, not drugs"
- 2012: "Global Action for Healthy Communities without Drugs"
- 2011: "Say No!"
- 2010: "Think health – not drugs"

World Anti-Narcotics Day in Pakistan

The magnitude of the drug menace not only undermines global public health, socio-economic synopsis, and international stability, it has also become an issue of National Security for Pakistan. Pakistan itself is a poppy free country, but its population became a victim of regional opiate production. We are facing the brunt of trafficking of opiates and cannabis from the West, precursors from the East, and Amphetamine-type Stimulants from elsewhere.

Each year International Drug Day is celebrated by Anti Narcotics Force. ANF celebrate Drug Day to raise awareness using a variety of drug demand awareness activities such as drug burning ceremonies.

== Model Addiction and Treatment Centres ==
ANF also plays a lead role in mass awareness and community participation program. Five Model Addiction and Treatment Centres (MATRCs) located at Rawalpindi, Peshawar, Quetta, Sukkur and Karachi.

Under the policy guidelines provided by NCD and with the co-operation of our allied countries, civil society, and the media, ANF has had success in drug supply reduction, drug demand reduction, and international cooperation.

== List of Director-Generals ==
List of Former Director-Generals ANF
S#.	Name	Start of Tenure	End of Tenure
	Major General Nadeem Ahmed	2003	2005
	Major General Syed Khalid Amir Jaffery	2005	2009
	Major General Syed Shakeel Hussain	2009	2012
	Major General Malik Zafar Iqbal	2012	2014
	Major General Khawar Hanif	2014	2016
	Major General Nasir Dilawar Shah	February 2016	March 2017
	Major General Musarrat Nawaz Malik	March 2017	October 2018
	Major General Muhammad Arif Malik	October 2018	August 2021
	Major General Ghulam Shabbir Narejo	August 2021	August 2022
	Major General Aneeq Ur Rehman Malik	August 2022	March 2024
	Major General Abdul Moeed	March 2024	Incumbent
