= Khalid Nawaz Khan =

Pakistani military person

Commander X Corps Rawalpindi
- In office May 2010 – August 2013
- Preceded by: Lt Gen Tahir Mahmood
- Succeeded by: Lt Gen Qamar Javed Bajwa

Commandant Command and Staff College, Quetta
- In office May 2006 – May 2010
- Preceded by: Maj. Gen. Ahmad Shuja Pasha
- Succeeded by: Lt Gen Khalid Rabbani

Personal details
- Education: Pakistan Military Academy
- Awards: Hilal-i-Imtiaz (Military); Sitara-e-Eisaar; Sword of Honour

Military service
- Allegiance: Pakistan
- Branch/service: Pakistan Army
- Years of service: 1974 — 2013
- Rank: Lieutenant General
- Unit: 3 Baloch Regiment
- Commands: School of Infantry and Tactics; National Defence University; Commandant Command and Staff College Quetta; Commander X Corps Rawalpindi

Khalid Nawaz Khan is a retired general of the Pakistan Army who served as the Corps Commander of X Corps based in Rawalpindi from May 2010 to August 2013.

== Early life and education ==
Khan is a graduate of the Command and Staff College, Quetta and the National Defence University in Islamabad, where he earned a master's degree in war studies. He also went to the Fort Leavenworth, USA .

== Military career ==
Khan as commissioned in the 3 Baloch Regiment via 51th PMA Long Course. He was given the Sword of Honour for his performance at the academy.

During his service, Khan held various command and staff positions. He served at the School of Infantry and Tactics and National Defence University. When he was elevated to the rank of three star general, he was then serving as the Commandant of the Command and Staff College, Quetta from 2009 to 2010.

In May 2010, he was appointed as the Corps Commander of X Corps, Rawalpindi, a position he held until August 2013. His tenure concluded with his retirement in August 2013.

== Post-retirement ==
Following his retirement from the military, Khan was appointed as the Managing Director of the Fauji Foundation, a conglomerate of businesses run by the Pakistan Army for the welfare of retired military personnel.

== Awards and decorations ==
In recognition of his service, Khan was awarded the Hilal-i-Imtiaz (Military), one of Pakistan's highest military honors. He also received the Sitara-i-Esaar for his contributions to disaster management efforts, notably during the 2005 earthquake relief operations.
