= Faiz Ali Chishti =

Pakistani general (1927–2024)

- Born: 1927; Punjab Province, British India
- Died: 23 December 2024 (aged 97); Rawalpindi, Punjab, Pakistan
- Military career
- Allegiance: British India (1927–1947); Pakistan (1947–2024)
- Branch: British Indian Army; Pakistan Army
- Service years: 1946–1980
- Rank: Lieutenant General
- Commands: X Corps

Faiz Ali Chishti (Urdu: فیض علی چشتی; 1927 – 23 December 2024) was a Pakistani lieutenant general and Corps commander of X Corps. He was born in Punjab in 1927. He joined the British Indian army in 1946 as an artillery officer and later joined the Pakistani army after partition in 1947. He was from 60 Medium Regiment Artillery in which he was later posted as CO (Commanding Officer).

Chishti was the architect of the 1977 martial law imposed in Pakistan, commanding the Corps of Military Police that held many political prisoners at that time. He wrote the book Betrayals of Another Kind. Islam, Democracy and the Army in Pakistan detailing President Zia-ul-Haq and the 1977 Pakistani military coup. He died after a prolonged illness at the Armed Forces Institute of Cardiology (AFIC) Rawalpindi Cantt, on 23 December 2024, at the age of 97.
