= Azad Jammu and Kashmir Public Service Commission =

Pakistani government agency

Azad Jammu & Kashmir Public Service Commission
- AJ&K PSC آزاد جموں و کشمیر عوامی خدمت کمیشن

Agency overview
- Formed: 1950
- Jurisdiction: Government of Azad Jammu & Kashmir
- Headquarters: Muzaffarabad, Pakistan
- Agency executive: Lt General (R) Hidayat Ur Rehman, Chairman; Secretary; Member
- Website: www.ajkpsc.gov.pk

Azad Jammu & Kashmir Public Service Commission (AJKPSC) is an agency of the Government of Azad Jammu & Kashmir that is responsible for recruiting civil servants and bureaucrats in Azad Jammu & Kashmir .

Lt General(R) Hidayat-Ur-Rehman serving as the Chairman of the commission since January 2024.

== History ==
After the establishment of Azad Government of the State of Jammu & Kashmir since December 28, 1950, first Rules of Business has been implemented. AJKPSC was launched according of these rules. The first Chairman was Mr. Ghulam Muhayyudin (CSP) Chief Advisor to Ministry of Kashmir Affairs. In March 1967 Azad Jammu & Kashmir Public Service Commission (AJKPSC) office shifted in Muzaffarabad city.

== Functioning ==
At present AJKPSC is functioning under Act 1986,

- To conduct test and examinations for recruitment to the civil services of Azad Jammu & Kashmir and such posts in connection with the affairs of the Government as may be prescribed by rules made under section 11.
- To advise the President on matters relating to qualification for and method of recruitment to, the services and posts referred to in clause (a);and
- Any other matter which the President may refer to the commission.

Most Popular civil posts are Lecturer, Subject Specialists, Medical Officers, Tehsildar/Naib Tehsildar, Assistant Sub Inspectors & Civil Judges.

== Composition of the commission ==
The commission consists of a chairman and the members. The chairman is appointed by the President of Azad Kashmir, in his discretion. The members are appointed by the president on the advice of the Prime Minister of Azad Kashmir . The commission is assisted by the secretary, who provides a link among the commission, its secretariat and the government agencies.

=== Current members ===
Sr. No	Name	Role	From	To	Ref
1	Lt General (R) Hidayat ur Rehman	Chairman	13 January 2024	Incumbent	
2	Dr. Syed Abid Hussain Shah	Member	13 January 2024	Incumbent	
3	Hafiz Muhammad Ibrahim Aziz	Member	13 January 2024	Incumbent	
4	Khawaja Saeed Bashir Butt	Member	13 January 2024	Incumbent	
5	Mr. Munir Hussain Chaudhary	Member	August, 2026	Incumbent	[5]
6	Dr. Liaqat Hussain	Member	August, 2026	Incumbent	[5]
7	Mr. Muhammad Zahid Khan	Member	August, 2026	Incumbent	[5]
8	Prof. Dr. Abdul Qadoos Khan	Member	August, 2026	Incumbent	[5]
9	Dr. Abdul Hameed	Member	August, 2026	Incumbent	[5]
10	Ms. Midhat Shehzad	Member	August, 2026	Incumbent	[5]
11	Dr. Mohammad Saleem Khan	Member	August, 2026	Incumbent	[5]

== See also ==
- Federal Public Service Commission
- Punjab Public Service Commission
- Sindh Public Service Commission
- Khyber Pakhtunkhwa Public Service Commission
- Balochistan Public Service Commission
