= Punjab Public Service Commission (India) =

State government agency

- PPSC

Government body overview
- Formed: 1 November 1956; 69 years ago
- Jurisdiction: Government of Punjab, India
- Headquarters: Baradari Garden, Maharani Club, Punjab, India
- Government body executive: Jatinder Aulakh, (Chairman) Gurpartap Singh Mann (Member) Kaur Sandhu (Bubbu Tir) (Member) (Member) Shivinder Singh Mann
- Website: ppsc.gov.in

The Punjab Public Service Commission (PPSC), formerly the Joint Public Service Commission, is a government agency of the state of Punjab, India, established under Article 315 of the Constitution of India, to select candidates for various state government jobs through competitive examinations.

== History ==
Punjab Public Service Commission was originally formed as Joint Public Service Commission at Lahore on 1 May 1937 before Partition of India. It was functioning under Khyber Pass and Yamuna River near Delhi. After British ended its governance in the country, the two newly independent countries India and Pakistan were born. In February, 1948, the two countries revised their provisions at Shimla that led the Punjab Public Service Commission to came into existence extending over the province of East Punjab. India, later merged Punjab and Patiala and East Punjab States Union that made the government to shift the commission to Patiala on 1 November 1956. The commission was working under PEPSU's jurisdiction. But on 1 November 1966, its territorial jurisdiction was decreased due to the formation of the States of Haryana and Himachal Pradesh and Indian-based commission came into existence by splitting the earlier formed commission in two constitutional bodies; one in India and another in Pakistan.

== Functions and responsibilities ==
The commission is performing various roles as amended in Article 320 of the Constitution of India.

- To conduct competitive and civil examinations under its present jurisdiction.
- To conducting screening test of the selected candidates.
- To frame and operate schemes as amended in the state public service commission Article, 320 under the supervision of Union Public Service Commission, if state requests.
- To make appointments to state civil services.
- To check the suitability of the candidates when promoting and transferring them from one service to another.

== Administration Profile ==
The state chief Secretary prepares the list of members and send it to state governor for their final appointments. State public service commission consists various members with different designations to perform their duties.

Name	Designation
Jatinder Aulakh	Chairman
Amar Partap Singh Virk	n/a
Gurpartap Singh Mann	Member
Kaur Sandhu (Bubbu Tir)	Member
Mohali SAS nagar	Member
lok Nath Angra	n/a
Dr. Neelam Grewal	Member
Supreet Ghuman	n/a

== Commission censorship ==
In 2018, the selection process of the commission-members triggered controversies when News media reported questions raised by the leaders. The selection panel was cited arbitrary and possible political links behind the criteria for choosing members of the Punjab Public Service Commission.

== See also ==
- Punjab Public Service Commission (Pakistan)
- List of Public service commissions in India
- Punjab Educational Services
