= Maqsood Ahmad =

Pakistani officer

Lieutenant-General Maqsood Ahmad HI(M)

Corps Commander IV Corps, Lahore
- In office 18 January 2013 – 26 August 2013
- Preceded by: Lt Gen Rashad Mahmood

Personal details
- Awards: Hilal-i-Imtiaz (Military)

Military service
- Allegiance: Pakistan
- Branch/service: Pakistan Army
- Rank: Lieutenant General
- Commands: GOC 12 Division, Muree; Deputy DG Inter Services Intelligence

Maqsood Ahmad, HI(M), is a retired three star officer of Pakistan Army and current chairman of Punjab Public Service Commission.

== Military career ==
Maqsood Ahmad Arain took commission in 24th Frontier Force Regiment in the 61st PMA Long Course in April 1980. During his tenure as a Major General, he commanded the 12th Infantry Division in Muree which holds a key position in Pakistan due to LOC being under its command. Later he served as Deputy Director General of Inter Services Intelligence under Lt. Gen. Ahmad Shuja Pasha and later under Lt. Gen. Zaheer-ul-Islam.

During his long career, he has held various important assignments and commanded a Unit, Brigade and later a division. He has also attended the Command and Staff College Quetta and the National Defence University Islamabad.

On 11 January 2013, Maqsood Ahmad was promoted to the rank of Lieutenant General. Later, he was given another key position as the Corps Commander of IV Corps, Lahore.

On 26 August 2013, UN Secretary-General Ban Ki-moon announced the appointment of Lieutenant General Maqsood Ahmad as Military Adviser for Peacekeeping Operations of the United Nations. The last time a General of Pakistan was offered this position in 2009, when Ahmad Shuja Pasha was nominated for this position. However then Chief of Army Staff General Ashfaq Pervez Kiyani rather preferred to keep Pasha in Pakistan for important assignments.

On 18 January 2018, Former Corps Commander IV Corps & Deputy DG ISI Lt General (R) Maqsood Ahmad appointed Chairman Punjab Public Service Commission.

He was born in Khushab, Punjab.

Military offices
Preceded by Rashad Mahmood	Chief of Staff IV Corps, Lahore; 18 January 2013 - present	Succeeded by Naveed Zaman
