= 111th Infantry Brigade (Pakistan) =

Infantry brigade of the Pakistan Army

- Active: 1956- Present
- Country: Pakistan
- Allegiance: Pakistan
- Branch: Pakistan Army
- Type: Light Infantry; Light Artillery; Psychological warfare
- Role: Quick response, defence of key installation (garrison brigade of GHQ)
- Size: More than 30,000 active duty soldiers
- Part of: X Corps
- Headquarters: Rawalpindi
- Nicknames: Triple 1 Brigade, Coup Brigade
- Anniversaries: Defence Day
- Engagements: 1958 Pakistani Military Coup; Operation Fair Play; Indo-Pakistani War of 1965; Battle of Chamb 1971; Siachen Conflict; Indo-Pakistani War of 1999; 1999 Pakistani coup d'état Operation Silence; Operation Janbaz
- Decorations: Pakistan Armed Forces Awards and decorations

Commanders
- Current Commander: Brigadier Zeeshan, Brigade Commander
- Notable commanders: LTG Sarfraz Ali; LTG Faiz Ali Chishti; LTG Jamshed Gulzar Kiani; General Yahya Khan; General Akhtar Abdur Rahman; LTG Javed Iqbal; Major General Bilal Omer Khan; Major General Muhamad Ali Khan; Major General Faheem Rao; LTG Asim Saleem Bajwa; Major General Salman Moin

The 111th Independent Infantry Brigade Group, commonly known as the 111th Brigade or Triple-1 Brigade, is an infantry brigade of the Pakistan Army notable for its frequent involvement and fast response in military coup d'etats since Pakistani independence. From 11 January 2012 Brigadier Sarfraz Ali commanded the Brigade. He succeeded Brigadier Faheem Rao who had earlier replaced Brigadier Asim Salim Bajwa.

== Main task of Brigade ==
The main task of the brigade is to provide security and protocol duties to the incoming dignitaries. In addition brigade is responsible (as a disguise) for the security of the President and the Prime Minister of Pakistan. It presents guard of honor to distinguished guests of Pakistan. It had one of the three best military bands of the Pakistan Army along with those of Pakistan Military Academy and Frontier Corps Khyber Pakhtunkhwa.

== Military operations ==
The 111th Brigade is the most well-known Army brigade in Pakistani social, public, religious, and political circles. Since its creation, the 111th Brigade has been frequently used to overtake and topple civilian governments. The brigade's first involvement in toppling a government was when General Ayub Khan deposed the government of Pakistani President Major General (retired) Iskander Mirza.

During the Battle of Chamb of 1971 war the Regiment played a significant role in the victory of the Pakistani army in battle, during the initial offensive commenced at 2020 hours on 3 December 1971, the 111 Brigade had to secure its part of the lodgement as it encountered enemy forces at moel, the 66 Brigade, however, accomplished its tasks in securing the Lodgement. The 111 brigade was intended to have captured Chamb by 5 December however it did not, despite the situation Major General Iftikhar Khan had commanded the Brigade to continue its objectives along with the 20 Brigade. Later on, once the 2 Armoured Regiment had captured Chamb the 111 Brigade would manage to secure a bridgehead across river Tawi after occupying the ferries of Darh and Raipur

On July 4, 1977, General Zia-ul-Haq conducted a coup d'état against the government of then-Pakistani Prime Minister Zulfikar Ali Bhutto. The loyalty of the 111 Brigade Commander is crucial to subsequent military regimes. For instance, Zia's mistrust of Commander X Corps, Chishti led him to remove the commander, Brigadier Mohammad Khan, considered close to Chishti and replaced him with Brigadier Rahat Latif without Chishti's knowledge.

The 111th Brigade is also responsible for the security of the prime minister's and president's house which makes it much easier for the army high command to execute coups against elected PMs. The brigade was also used by General Parvez Musharraf in thwarting the Sharif regime after Sharif tried to replace him with Ziauddin Butt. Lt. Generals Aziz and Mahmud reacted quickly after the government broadcast Musharraf's retirement on television. Mahmud reportedly ordered the 111-brigade commander, Brigadier Salahuddin Satti, to secure the prime minister's house. The 111 Brigade completed the coup after confining the prime minister and his aides to the PM house. Prime Minister Sharif was arrested and was later exiled to Saudi Arabia.

In 2007, The brigade's last major participation was in the Siege of Lal Masjid, in which the government led by Pervez Musharraf ordered the Pakistan Army Rangers, and the 111th Brigade surround the Lal Masjid in Islamabad. Clashes between the mosque affiliated militia and the security forces quickly ensued. The 111th Brigade was tasked alongside the Pakistan Rangers and the Special Service Group in capturing the complex.

In 2008, When the Lawyers' Movement was launched, the Pakistani media speculated that the Asif Ali Zardari would launch a psychological operation against the movement. However, it was later decided by the Pakistani military leadership not to launch the operation.

In 2010, the 111th Brigade had taken over the control of Islamabad Capital Territory, and provided the intense and tight security for both the Chinese Premier and Pakistan's Prime minister. The brigade was deployed by the order of Prime minister Yousaf Raza Gillani, and it had directly reported to Chief of Army Staff General Ashfaq Parvez Kayani. The Jang News later cited that ISI had learnt that unnamed neighboring country has planned to sabotage the Chinese Premier's state visit to Pakistan.

== Current structure ==
The brigade comprises the following elements: five infantry battalions (each from a different infantry regiment), an armoured regiment (battalion-sized), three artillery batteries, and a special forces battalion.

- 6th Battalion, Punjab Regiment
- 11th Battalion, Baloch Regiment
- 1st Battalion, Frontier Force Regiment
- 2nd Battalion, Northern Light Infantry Regiment
- one airborne battalion
- two light artillery batteries
- one air defence battery
