= Federal Public Service Commission =

Central recruiting agency of the government of Pakistan

- FPSC فیڈرل پبلک سروس کمیشن

Agency overview
- Formed: 1926 (first established in British India); 1964 (later established in Pakistan)
- Jurisdiction: Government of Pakistan
- Headquarters: Islamabad, Pakistan
- Employees
- Agency executives: Lt. General(R) Akhtar Nawaz Satti, Chairman
- Parent agency: Establishment Division
- Website: www.fpsc.gov.pk

The Federal Public Service Commission (FPSC) (Urdu: فیڈرل پبلک سروس کمیشن) is a constitutional and statutory federal agency of Government of Pakistan that is responsible for recruiting civil servants for Government of Pakistan working under the article 242 of the Constitution of Paistan.

The commission is chaired by the Chairman FPSC. The current FPSC chairman is Lt. General (R) Akhtar Nawaz Satti.

== History ==
The Public Service Commission was set up for the first time under British colonial rule in 1926. After independence, the commission was established in Pakistan in 1947 under the provision of Government of Pakistan Act.

== Functioning ==
At present, the commission is functioning under Article 242 of the constitution of Islamic Republic of Pakistan. It has been provided autonomy under the Rules of Business, 1973 and FPSC Regulations, 1978 in its working.

=== Composition Of The Commission ===
The commission consists of a chairman and the members. The chairman is appointed by the President of Pakistan, at his discretion, under Article 242 (IA) of the Constitution of Pakistan (1973). The members are appointed by the president on the advice of the Prime Minister of Pakistan. The commission is assisted by the secretary, who provides a link between the commission, its secretariat and the government agencies.

== About CSS Examination (Central Superior Services of Pakistan) ==
CSS is a competitive examination through which FPSC recruits public servants. It is the toughest competitive examination of Pakistan for recruiting civil servants.

== Chairmen of FPSC (Based on FPSC Annual Report 2013) ==
Name	From	To
Mian Afzal Hussain	1947	30 September 1952
Zakir Hussain	20 October 1952	19 October 1957
Mian Aminud Din	21 October 1957	March 1958
Col (Retd) A. S. B. Shah	April 1958	14 June 1963
Kazi Anwarul Haque	15 June 1963	28 March 1965
Agha Abdul Hameed	20 April 1965	25 February 1966
Nazir Ahmed	8 March 1966	1 May 1969
Ali Asghar	19 May 1969	3 February 1972
S. Manzoor Elahi	19 February 1972	15 March 1972
Justice (Retd) Faizullah Kundi	16 May 1972	22 December 1977
Lt General (Retd) M. Attiqur Rehman, MC	26 December 1977	25 December 1985
Admiral (Retd) M. Sharif, NI(M), HJ	28 January 1986	27 January 1991
Zahur Azar	28 January 1991	28 January 1994
Justice (Retd) Zafar Hussain Mirza	28 January 1994	28 January 1997
Lt General (Retd) Mumtaz Gul, HI(M), TBT	18 February 1997	17 February 2002
Air Marshal (Retd) Shafique Haider, HI(M)	25 February 2002	10 February 2003
Lt General (Retd) Jamshed Gulzar, HI(M)	31 March 2003	30 March 2006
Lt General (Retd) Shahid Hamid, HI(M)	31 March 2006	30 March 2009
Justice (Retd) Rana Bhagwandas	17 December 2009	16 December 2012
IGP (Retd) Malik Asif Hayat	16 December 2012	2014
Naveed Akram Cheema	2014	2018
Haseeb Akhtar	2018	2020
Captain (Retd) Maroof Afzal	2020	2020
Shahid Ashraf Tarar	2023	october 2024
Lt.General(Retd) Akhtar Nawaz Satti	9 October 2024	Incumbent

== See also ==
- Punjab Public Service Commission
- Sindh Public Service Commission
- Khyber Pakhtunkhwa Public Service Commission
- Balochistan Public Service Commission
- Azad Jammu and Kashmir Public Service Commission
