= Azhar Abbas (general) =

Pakistani general

Lieutenant General Azhar Abbas HI(M)

38th Chief of General Staff
- In office September 2021 – December 2022
- Preceded by: Lt Gen Sahir Shamshad Mirza
- Succeeded by: Lt Gen Muhammad Saeed (general)

Commander X Corps
- In office September 2019 – September 2021
- Preceded by: Lt Gen (r) Bilal Akbar
- Succeeded by: Lt Gen Sahir Shamshad Mirza

Director General Joint Staff HQ
- In office April 2019 – September 2019
- Preceded by: Lt Gen (r) Malik Zafar Iqbal
- Succeeded by: Lt Gen Muhammad Chiragh Haider Baloch

Commandant School of Infantry & Tactics, Quetta
- In office June 2018 – April 2019
- Preceded by: Maj Gen Shahid Nazir
- Succeeded by: Maj Gen Salman Fayyaz Ghani

GOC 12 Infantry Division, Murree
- In office December 2016 – June 2018
- Preceded by: Maj Gen Muhammad Kaleem Asif
- Succeeded by: Maj Gen Amer Ahsan Nawaz

Private Secretary to Chief of Army Staff, PS(C)
- In office December 2013 – December 2016
- Preceded by: Brig Muhammad Saeed
- Succeeded by: Brig Iftikhar Hassan Chaudhry

Personal details
- Education: Command and Staff College, Quetta; National Defence University, Islamabad

Military service
- Allegiance: Pakistan
- Branch/service: Pakistan Army
- Years of service: 1987-2022
- Rank: Lieutenant General
- Unit: 41 Baloch
- Awards: Hilal-e-Imtiaz (Military)

Azhar Abbas HI(M) (Urdu: اظہر عباس) was a three-star ranking general in the Pakistani Army, who served as the 38th Chief of General Staff (CGS) of the Pakistan Army. He was appointed to the position on 8 September 2021, was replaced by Lieutenant-General Muhammad Saeed.

Chief of General Staff is responsible for operational and intelligence matters at the General Headquarters in Rawalpindi. Abbas was commissioned in the 41st Battalion of Baloch Regiment. Previously, he served as Commandant School of Infantry and Tactics in Quetta, headed a division in Murree, worked as a Brigadier in the Operations Directorate, and was also a Private Secretary to the former Chief of Army Staff, General Raheel Sharif.

== Awards and decorations ==

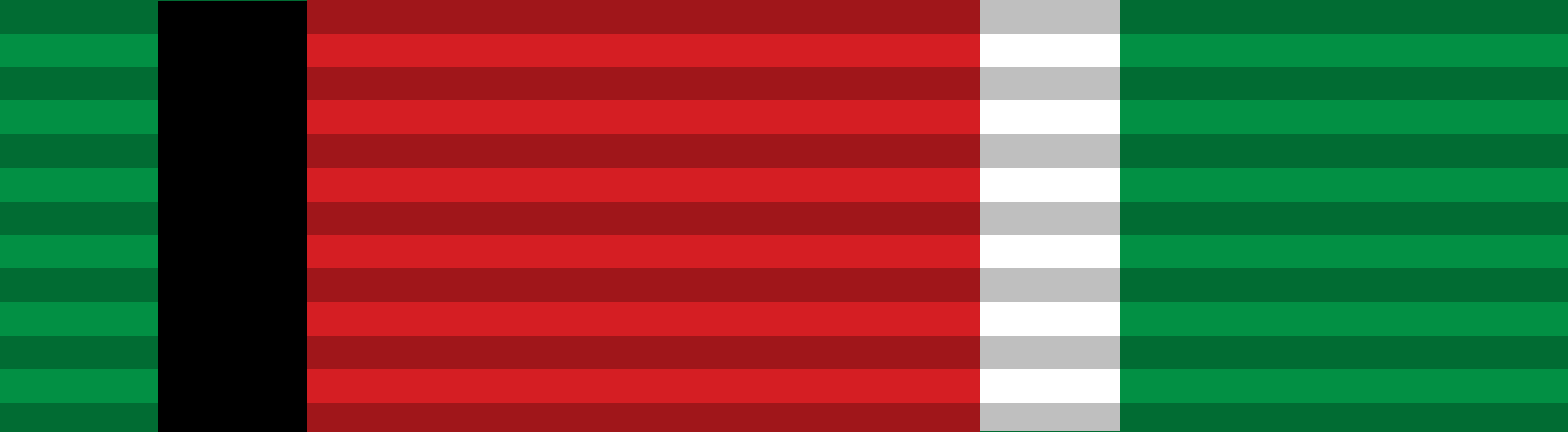

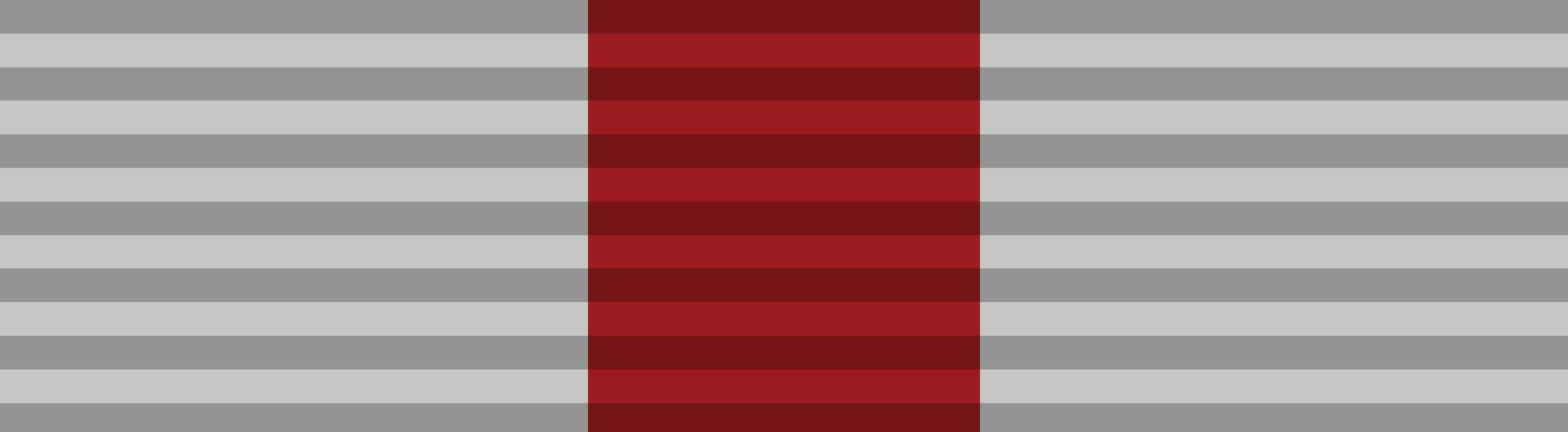

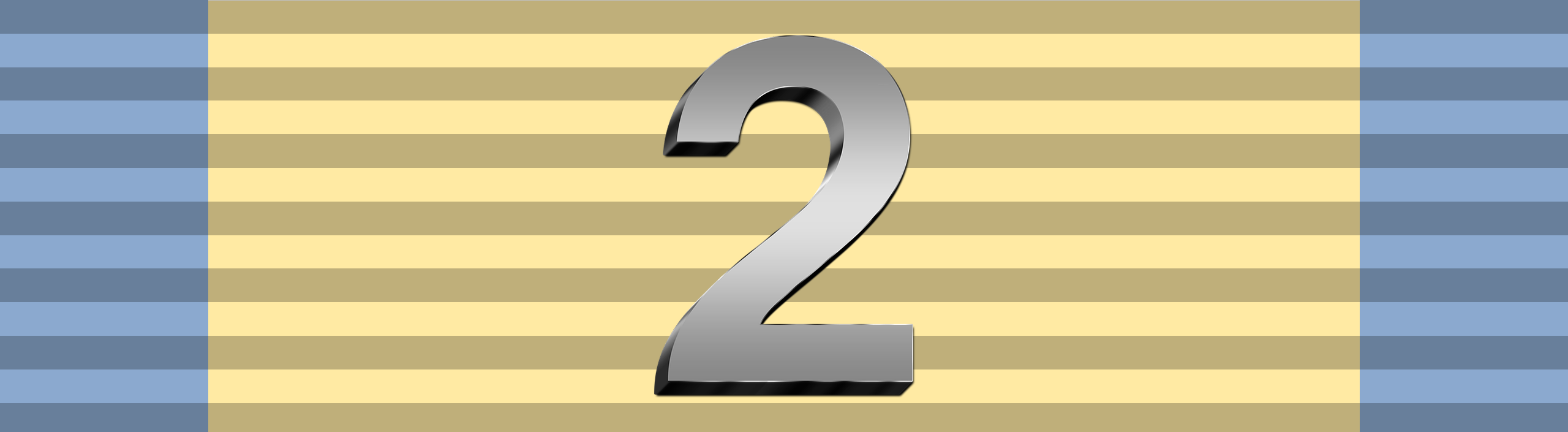

Hilal-e-Imtiaz (Military) (Crescent of Excellence) (2018)		Tamgha-e-Diffa (General Service Medal) Siachen Glacier Clasp	
Tamgha-e-Baqa (Nuclear Test Medal) 1998	Tamgha-e-Istaqlal Pakistan (Escalation with India Medal) 2002	Tamgha-e-Azm (Medal of Conviction) (2018)	10 Years Service Medal
20 Years Service Medal	30 Years Service Medal	35 Years Service Medal	Jamhuriat Tamgha (Democracy Medal) 1988
Qarardad-e-Pakistan Tamgha (Resolution Day Golden Jubilee Medal) 1990	Tamgha-e-Salgirah Pakistan (Independence Day Golden Jubilee Medal) 1997	Command & Staff College Quetta Student's Medal	United Nations MINURSO Medal (2 Deployments)

=== Foreign decorations ===
Foreign Awards
United Nations	MINURSO Medal

== Dates of rank ==
Insignia	Rank	Date
	Lieutenant General	April 2019
	Major General	February 2015
	Brigadier	April 2009
	Lieutenant Colonel	March 2005
	Major	April 1996
	Captain	April 1989
	Lieutenant	April 1988
	Second Lieutenant	September 1987

Military offices
Preceded by Sahir Shamshad Mirza	Chief of General Staff; 2021–2022	Succeeded by Muhammad Saeed
