= School of Infantry and Tactics (Pakistan) =

Joint training formation of Pakistan Army & Navy

- Emblem of School of Infantry and Tactics
- Active: 1948; 78 years ago
- Country: Pakistan
- Branch: Pakistan Army
- Type: Training formation
- Garrison/HQ: Quetta, Balochistan in Pakistan
- Nicknames: SI&T

Commanders
- Commandant: Maj Gen Zulfikar Shaheen

The School of Infantry and Tactics is an initial military training school of the Pakistan Army that provides training to its troops to be commissioned in the infantry regiments. The SI&T prides itself being the "custodian of infantry combat culture."

The school's main focus is on integrated and combined arms training parameters together with the Pakistan Army and the Pakistan Marines, the combat branch of the Pakistan Navy.

== Overview ==
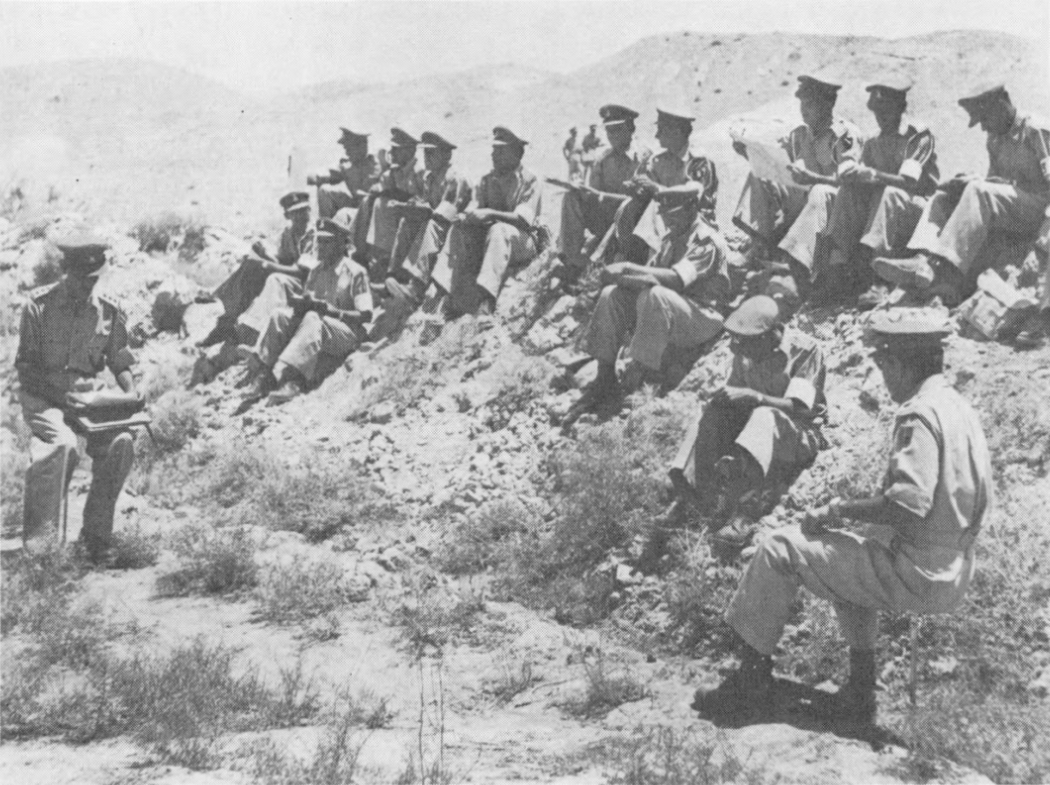
The Pakistan Army troops participating in the tactical discussion at SI&T, ca. 1963.

The School of Infantry and Tactics was originally established in Kakul, near the Pakistan Military Academy in 1948, with Col. N J G Jones of the British Army becoming its first officer commanding. In 1956, the SI&T was moved to Quetta, Balochistan in Pakistan, and was reorganized under the United States Army Infantry School.

Since 2004, the SI&T has not been restricted to the Pakistan Army but also provides training to the Pakistan Navy's Marines Corps.
