= Punjab Public Service Commission (Pakistan) =

State government agency

Punjab Public Service Commission (PPSC)
- PPSC

Agency overview
- Formed: April 1937; 89 years ago
- Preceding agency: British India Civil Service
- Type: Commission
- Jurisdiction: Punjab, Pakistan
- Status: Active
- Headquarters: Lahore; 31.561488714863607°N 74.33259811431691°E
- Agency executive: Lt. Gen. (Retd.) Muhammad Abdul Aziz, Chairman
- Website: www.ppsc.gop.pk

The Punjab Public Service Commission (PPSC) is a constitutional and statutory government agency responsible for hiring and administering the provincial civil services and management services in the Punjab Province of Pakistan. The current PPSC chairman is Lt. Gen. (Retd.) Muhammad Abdul Aziz, in office since 17 May 2024.

== History ==
The Punjab Public Service Commission, established in April 1937, is the oldest Provincial Public Service Commission in Pakistan. It was established under the Punjab Public Service Commission Ordinance, of 1978. It functions in accordance with the ambit of the Punjab Public Service Commission Ordinance, 1978, and Punjab Public Service Commission (Functions) Rules, 1979.

== See also ==
- Federal Public Service Commission
- Sindh Public Service Commission
- Khyber Pakhtunkhwa Public Service Commission
- Balochistan Public Service Commission
- Azad Jammu and Kashmir Public Service Commission
