= Abdul Rashid Ghazi =

Pakistani Islamic scholar and diplomat (1964–2007)

- عبد الرشید غازی

Chief Executive of Faridia University
- In office 1998–2007
- Preceded by: None (office vacant)
- Succeeded by: Muhammad Abdul Aziz

Khatib of Lal Masjid
- In office 1998–2007
- Preceded by: Muhammad Abdullah Ghazi
- Succeeded by: Muhammad Abdul Aziz

Leader of Difa-e-Pakistan Council
- In office 2001–2007
- Preceded by: None (office created)
- Succeeded by: Hamid-ul-Haq

Chairman of Defense of Human Rights Pakistan (DHR)
- In office 2002–2007
- Preceded by: None (office created)
- Succeeded by: Amina Masood Janjua

Personal life
- Born: 29 January 1964 Basti-Abdullah, West Pakistan (present-day Punjab, Pakistan)
- Died: 10 July 2007 (aged 43) Lal Masjid, Islamabad, Pakistan
- Cause of death: Assassination (gunshot wounds)
- Resting place: Jamia Abdullah Bin Ghazi, Rojhan, Rajanpur District, Punjab; 28°32'49"N 69°47'25"E
- Children: Haroon Rashid Ghazi; Haris Rashid Ghazi; Hamza Rashid Ghazi
- Parent: Muhammad Abdullah Ghazi (Father)
- Education: Quaid-i-Azam University
- Occupation: Diplomat; Islamic scholar
- Relations: Muhammad Abdul Aziz (Brother); Umme Hassan (Sister-in-law)

Religious life
- Religion: Islam
- Denomination: Sunni
- Jurisprudence: Hanafi
- Movement: Deobandi
- Military career
- Conflicts: Soviet–Afghan War; Siege of Lal Masjid X

Abdul Rashid Ghazi (Note: Urdu: عبد الرشید غازی) (c. 29 January 1964 – 10 July 2007) was a Pakistani Islamic scholar and diplomat-turned Islamist dissident who was Khatib of Lal Masjid, the Chief Executive of Jamia Faridia University, the Chairman of Defense of Human Rights Pakistan (DHR), a member of UNICEF Committee on preventive healthcare and a leader of Difa-e-Pakistan Council. Prior to this he had worked for the Ministry of Education and was a diplomat affiliated with UNESCO, a specialized agency of the United Nations.

He was the son of Muhammad Abdullah Ghazi, and younger brother of Abdul Aziz Ghazi.

Abdul Rashid was assassinated on 10 July 2007 during Operation Sunrise after Pakistan Army Special Service Group stormed the Lal Masjid in Islamabad.

In February 2016, Islamabad High Court issued an arrest warrants for Pervez Musharraf and several other high-ranking officials for their role in the targeted killing of Ghazi and sought a Red Notice from Interpol. The Supreme Court of Pakistan also ruled that the killing was an extrajudicial assassination.

== Early life and education ==
Abdul Rashid Ghazi was born on 29 January 1964 in the town of Basti Abdullah near Rojhan in Rajanpur, the border district of Punjab province of Pakistan. He hailed from an ethnic Baloch family belonging to the Sodwani clan of the Mazari tribe. Ghazi was fluent in his native Balochi, Saraiki, Urdu, Persian, English and Arabic. He generally used to communicate in Balochi with his family and the tribals of his area.

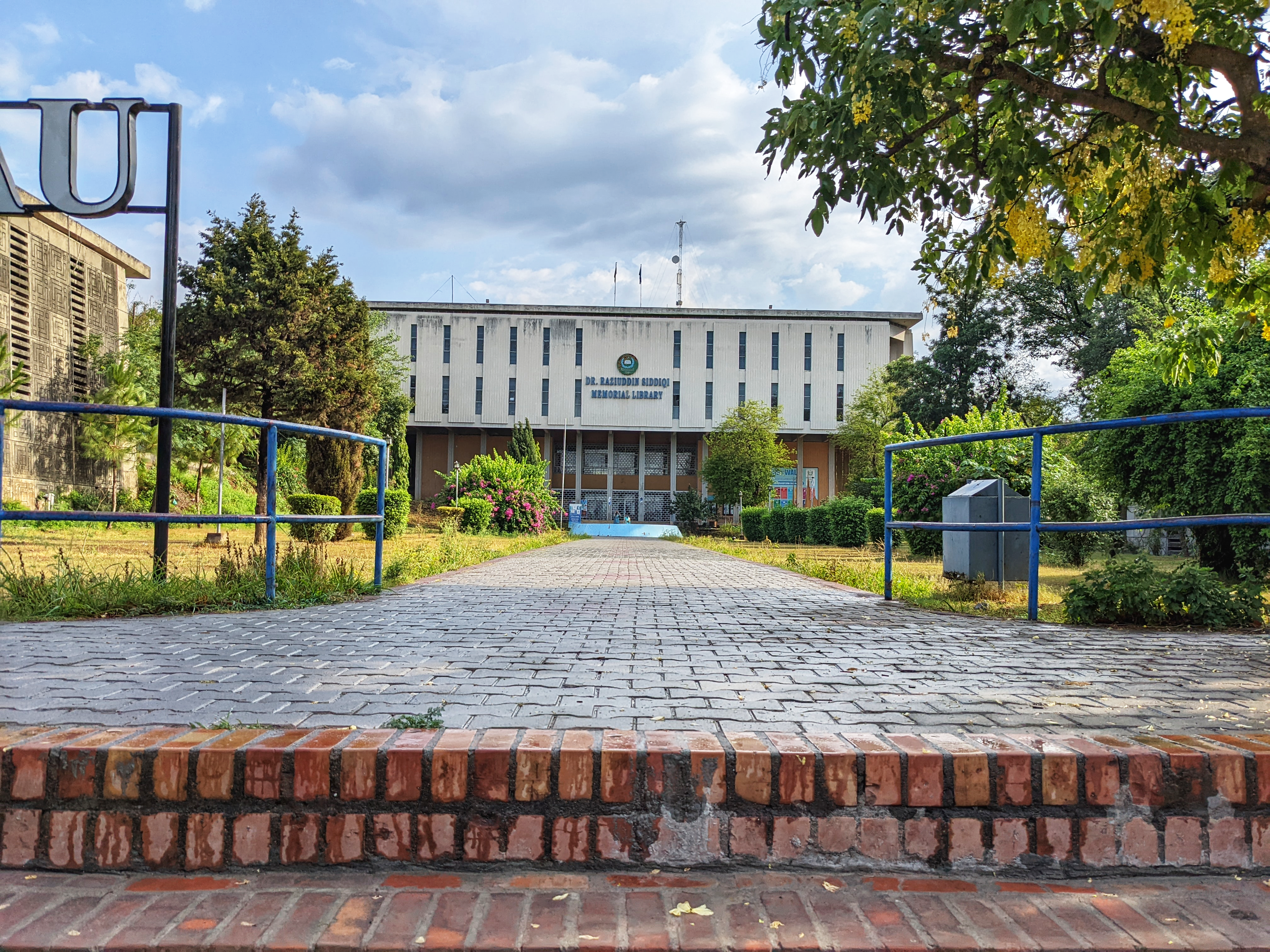
Ghazi completed his Master of Science degree in history from Quaid-e-Azam University Islamabad in 1987–1988

In his youth, Abdul Rashid defied his father's wish that he receive formal Islamic education as he wanted to live a modern life. He completed his Master of Science degree in history from Quaid-e-Azam University Islamabad in 1987–1988. A photo of him and his classmates still hangs on the history department's wall. According to one of his professors, "He was a normal, modern student and a lively fellow who was well adjusted to a co-educational system." Remembered by his friends as "a bright student and an active member of a progressive student organization", "He could have been a ambassador in the foreign office or an educationist", his friend once stated in an interview.

He was non-religious during that time, hardly if ever going to the mosque and reading authors like Karl Marx, Max Weber and Henry Kissinger, "his greatest ambition was to become a diplomat at the United Nations", a friend added, to the extent that he stopped talking to his father, who was antagonized by his "Westernized" lifestyle.

Declan Walsh also quotes peoples who knew him during this time, saying that he was a secularized student reading the likes of Nietzsche and Rousseau, mingling with women and being fond of singing.

== Professional career ==
=== Civil service career ===
Having completed his M.Sc. in history, he secured a position at the Pakistan National Commission and later joined the Ministry of Education in Islamabad as a Grade-17 officer, where he briefly was the editor of its monthly magazine, Piyami.

=== Diplomatic career ===
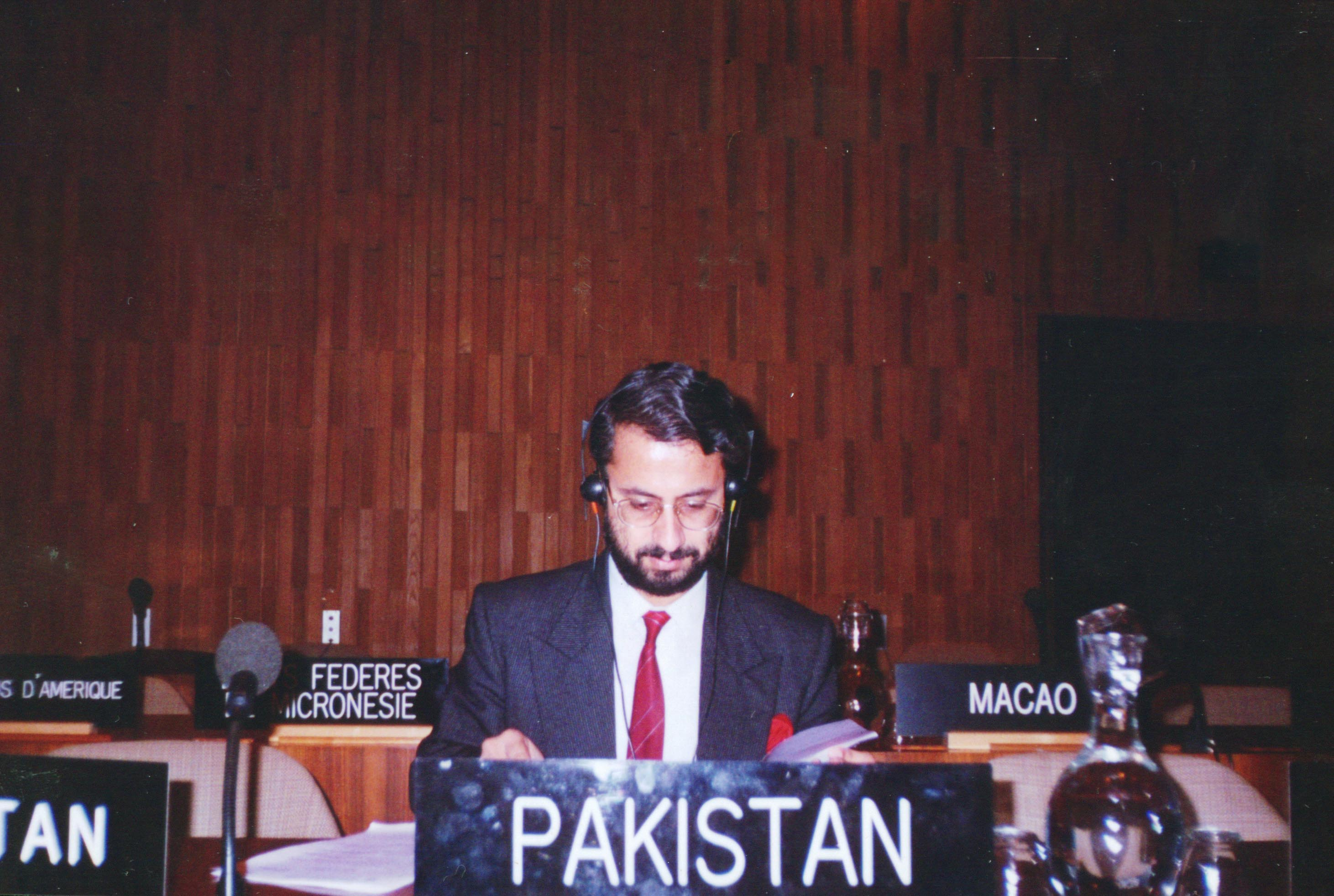
Ghazi representing Pakistan at Maison de l'UNESCO

He subsequently joined the United Nations Educational, Scientific and Cultural Organization (UNESCO), a specialized agency of the United Nations (UN).

He initially was at UNESCO's National Office in Islamabad, Later, he was briefly transferred to the organization's Regional Bureau for Education in Asia, located in Thailand.

In his later career, he was stationed at the Maison de l'UNESCO in Paris, France, as a Representative and Diplomat. He was also as a member of the Pakistani Delegation to UNESCO linked with Embassy of Pakistan in Paris.

== Visits to Afghanistan ==
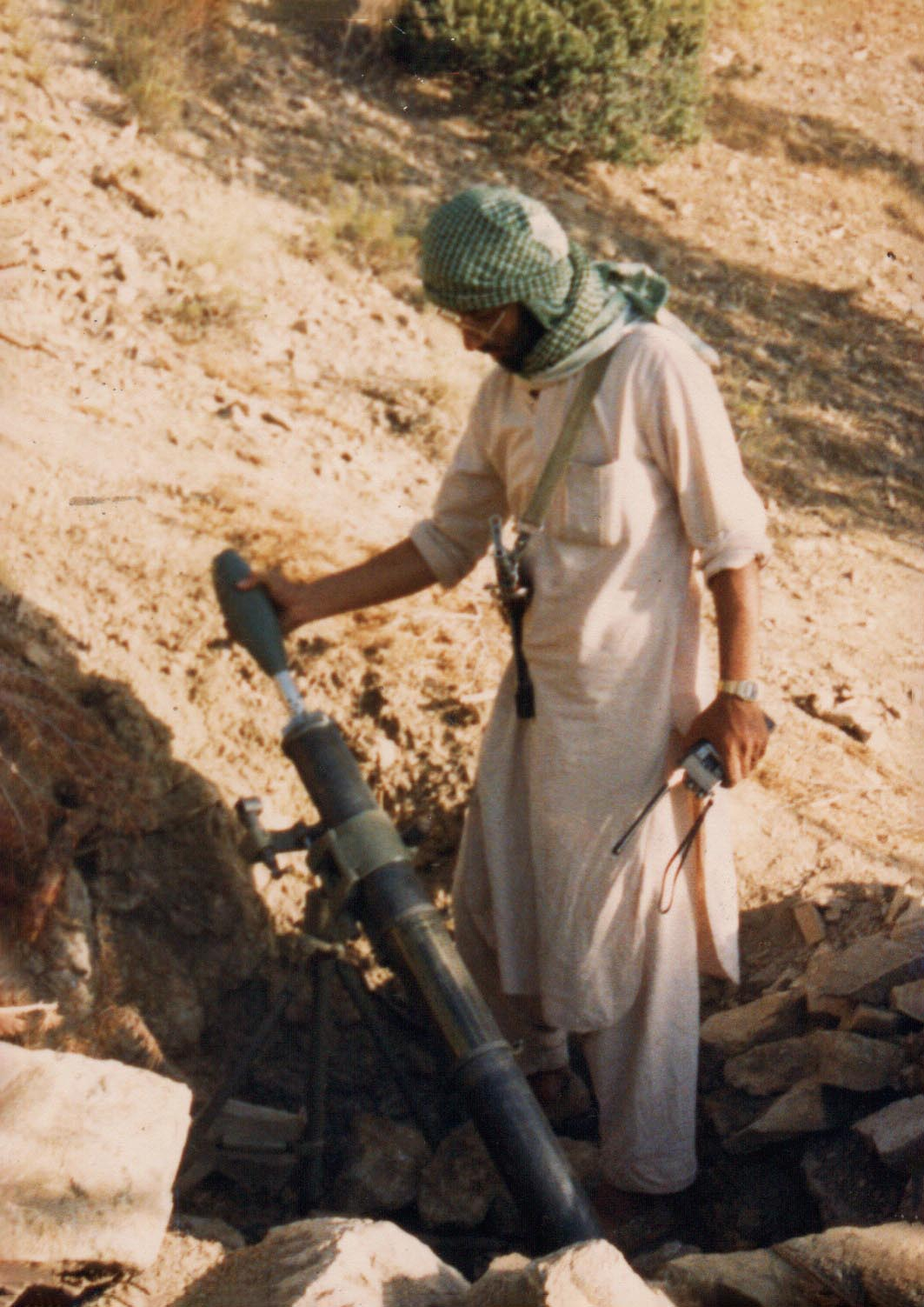
Ghazi firing a mortar in Paktia Province, Afghanistan, during the Soviet-Afghan War.

=== Soviet–Afghan War ===
In 1988, Ghazi was convinced by his brother, Abdul Aziz, an active participant in the Soviet–Afghan War, to travel with him to Afghanistan's Paktia Province. The brothers subsequently saw brief combat service in the region. According to a contemporary account from a fellow fighter, they engaged in several skirmishes with Soviet forces near the Afghanistan–Pakistan border.

In one incident, Ghazi narrowly survived a land mine explosion, after which he adopted the honorific title Ghazi (Arabic: "warrior"). Journalist Declan Walsh cites a companion of Ghazi who stated that he was primarily motivated by the excitement and adventure of war rather than religious ideology and notes that this attitude was not uncommon among young men joining the anti-Soviet resistance.

=== Kandahar meeting ===
In 1997, Ghazi traveled to Kandahar with his father and a delegation of religious scholars, where they met with Taliban leader Mullah Omar and Osama bin Laden.

Ghazi, when referring to these events, stated: "The meeting inspired me to work for the establishment of Islamic state." He recalled that at the end of the meeting, he picked up and drank water from a cup which bin Laden had used. An amused bin Laden asked Ghazi why he had done so, to which Ghazi replied: "I drank from your glass so that Allah would make me a great warrior like you".

== Assassination of his father ==
In October 1998, Ghazi's father was assassinated in the courtyard of Lal Masjid as he returning from teaching a class at Jamia Faridia. Due to a lack of confidence in Pakistan's legal system, Abdul Aziz, the elder brother of Ghazi, initially declined to file a First Information Report (FIR). However, Ghazi proceeded to file the FIR, prompting a police investigation into the case. After persistent efforts, a suspect was arrested and subsequently identified by an eyewitness during an identification parade.

Despite this, the suspect was inexplicably released the following day. Ghazi protested the release, warning the authorities that he would pursue legal action if the suspect was not promptly re-arrested. As pressure mounted, he reportedly faced threats, including a warning to withdraw the case or risk suffering a fate similar to that of his father.

According to those close to him, this experience marked a turning point in his life, leading to his disillusionment with the legal system.

== Post-2001 activities ==
Ghazi adopted the trappings of an Islamist, wearing a pakol (wool hat) and a checkered Palestinian keffiyeh over white robes, and was appointed as the Khatib of Lal Masjid, Ghazi however still retained the courteous manner and open-minded curiosity of his student years and was known to welcome foreign visitors at his quarters, charming and cajoling them.

Ghazi maintained associations with a range of militant and political figures. Among his militant contacts were Fazlur Rehman Khalil of Harkat-ul-Mujahideen and Masood Azhar of Jaish-e-Mohammed; Azhar also made a rare public appearance to meet Ghazi at Lal Masjid in 2002. Ghazi was also allied with leaders of Sipah-e-Sahaba, including Azam Tariq and Ali Sher Hyderi. After Tariq's assassination in 2003, Ghazi led his funeral prayers at Lal Masjid.

Politically, Ghazi's allies included prominent religious leaders such as Qazi Hussain Ahmad of Jamaat-e-Islami, Fazal-ur-Rehman of the JUI-F, Samiul Haq of the JUI-S, Shah Abdul Aziz and Syed Nasib Ali Shah.

=== Difa-e-Pakistan Council ===
In 2001, when the country's religious parties formed a coalition known as Pakistan-Afghanistan Defense Council to protest the war in Afghanistan, Ghazi emerged as a central figure in the movement. He played a key role in organizing demonstrations across Islamabad and was appointed as the coalition's chief spokesperson and later as the coalition's regional chairman.

On 7 October 2001, in response to the United States invasion of Afghanistan, Ghazi addressed the press. He stated, "… As we announced earlier, we will issue a call for Jihad (holy war) against the United States… We have already demanded that the U.S. present evidence to the world if Osama bin Laden was involved in the recent acts of terrorism in New York and Washington. Instead, the United States, claiming to be a superpower, took unilateral action…"

In the months following the invasion, Ghazi led several rallies alongside Munawar Hassan and contended that no country could successfully invade Afghanistan, noting the past defeats of Britain and Russia. He warned that the U.S. was making a "similar mistake" and would meet a "similar fate."

In 2003, Ghazi would later also lead protests against the Invasion of Iraq.

In 2006, Ghazi also led protests against Pope Benedict XVI's Regensburg lecture.

=== 2001 Arrest and Release ===
On 23 December 2001, Ghazi was arrested from Aabpara in Islamabad. The arrest followed a public speech in which he criticized President Pervez Musharraf for Pakistan's involvement in the War in Afghanistan and for supporting the U.S.-led invasion.

On 29 December 2001, the PADC organized a protest demonstration in front of Lal Masjid against the detention of Ghazi. Participants, carrying placards and banners, chanted slogans condemning the government's policies. They demanded the immediate release of Ghazi, and warned that PADC would escalate its actions with protest rallies across the twin cities.

Following his release in January 2002, Ghazi claimed that he was a prisoner of conscience, denying any involvement in violence and asserting that his activism was purely peaceful. He was quoted as saying, "I have not blasted a bomb anywhere, I have not killed anyone and all my demonstrations were peaceful... I just have a difference of opinion, which should not be a problem for anyone. I call this a kind of dictatorship."

He also publicly criticized the Pakistani government's ban on jihadist groups such as Lashkar-e-Taiba and Jaish-e-Mohammed, and questioned the rationale for banning religious organizations like the Sipah-e-Sahaba (SSP). He stated that if any madrassa were proven to be involved in terrorism, all "peace-loving religious sects" and madrassa administrations would sever ties with those entities.

=== Defense of human rights ===
Ghazi and his close associate Khalid Khawaja were prominent activists involved in various social causes, including addressing enforced disappearances in Pakistan. In 2002, they co-founded the human rights group Defense of Human Rights (Urdu: تحفظ حقوق إنساني). Ghazi was the organization's first chairman while Khawaja was its spokesman.

The organization became involved in recovery case of the alleged child abduction victim Molly Campbell, providing her shelter at the Jamia Hafsa during her parental custody trial.

=== Jamia Faridia ===
Ghazi also was Chief Executive (Rector/President) of Faridia University, an Islamic university situated near the Faisal Mosque in Islamabad, Pakistan. he is credited with modernization of the institute where alongside the traditional Dars-i Nizami, he introduced new academic programmes including information technology, Islamic Economics and himself taught English and Philosophy. In 2002, Ghazi extended an invitation to Pakistani scientist Abdul Qadeer Khan to attend the Khatam-e-Bukhari ceremony at his seminary, Jamia Faridia. Subsequently, Khan also generously supported the construction of a park adjacent to the seminary and facilitated the creation of a forest pedestrian path leading from the seminary to Faisal Mosque, which was named in his honor.

In 2003, he inaugurated the Al Faridia Model School, a free for all high school offering classes from 7th till matriculation.

Farid Esack recounts to have met Ghazi multiple times at the Faridia University seminary, Ghazi peppered the South African with questions about Nelson Mandela's life in prison, and they chatted for hours about revolutionaries like Che Guevara and Fidel Castro. "He certainly saw himself in that mold, as the righteous moral rebel." Esack said, both of them are also said to have debated their conflicting opinions on Islam, "My vision of an inclusive polity influenced by progressive Islamic values is very different than Ghazi's, of course, but his theology should not be reduced to a caricature, as it so often was, especially in the West", Esack recounted.

In 2005, Ghazi attended the graduation ceremony at Darul Uloom Karachi as a guest speaker. During this event, he met Pakistani jurist Mufti Taqi Usmani. Later, when Usmani visited Islamabad, he toured Ghazi's seminary and commended his administration.

Ghazi also collaborated with the Washington, D.C.-based nonprofit organization, International Center for Religion & Diplomacy (ICRD), supporting their madrasa reform initiatives in Pakistan.

=== Kashmir earthquake ===
Following the devastating 2005 Kashmir earthquake, Ghazi played a significant role in the relief efforts, providing essential aid to the affected communities, including the distribution of food and tents to displaced individuals.

In response to the disaster, Ghazi established the Al-Qasim Foundation (Urdu: القاسم فاؤنڈیشن), a relief organization that mobilized volunteer students from local seminaries, with its headquarters based at Jamia Faridia. Under his leadership, the foundation distributed relief goods valued at approximately Rs 100 million to earthquake victims.

Ghazi personally oversaw multiple relief operations and made several trips to the earthquake-stricken areas of Kashmir. In one notable incident, he narrowly avoided a fatal accident by missing a scheduled flight on a MI-17 transport helicopter, which later crashed in the mountainous region of Kashmir.

=== UNICEF ===
In 2003, Ghazi joined UNICEF, a United Nations led humanitarian organization, where he was a member of committee formed to raise awareness regarding preventive healthcare including HIV.

The following year, Ghazi joined a delegation of religious leaders, led by United Nations official Bettina Schunter, to travel to South Africa to learn about HIV prevention. This trip was aimed at improving the efforts of religious leaders in combating the spread of HIV in their communities.

=== Assassination attempt ===
In January 2005, shortly after dawn, Ghazi was driving from the Blue Area in Islamabad towards Jamia Faridia. While driving along the Seventh Avenue in Islamabad near the Margalla Hills, individuals in a nearby vehicle opened fire on him. Ghazi, armed with a handgun, returned fire, forcing the assailants to flee the scene.

Following this incident, Ghazi began carrying an AK-74 for protection and kept the weapon in his car, near his work desk, and even by his bedside.

== Siege of Lal Masjid and assassination ==
In 2007, Ghazi's elder brother Abdul Aziz alongside his wife Umme Hassan launched an anti-vice and Shari'a campaign by occupying a nearby library and embarking on vigilante raids through the city to stop what he called "un-Islamic activities," such as film vendors, barber shops and a Chinese-run massage parlor that he accused of being a brothel. Ghazi demanded that his elder brother Aziz return the seized library and end the standoff, He enlisted his long-time friend, Khalid Khawaja, to mediate with his brother, but his brother rejected all demands.

Seeking to de-escalate the standoff, Ghazi at press conference stated that the Lal Masjid administration did not intend to impose Sharia law by force and then met with Shujaat Hussain and asked him to act as a negotiator. Hussain subsequently reported that the primary conflict with the government had been resolved through dialogue, claiming that Ghazi had asked for his assistance in securing a peaceful settlement. According to Hussain, the only remaining issue concerned the reconstruction of the demolished mosques, and he was quoted as saying, "There will be no operation." Ghazi's willingness to negotiate and refrain from further militant activity often placed him at odds with his more hardline brother. Ghazi also occasionally joked that his brother's activities were similar to Rudy Giuliani's crackdown on crime as mayor of New York City.

On 3 July 2007, following a prolonged standoff between his brother and the government, the Pakistan military initiated an operation against Lal Masjid. Elements of the Pakistan Army, including the 111th Brigade, Special Service Group, and the Pakistan Rangers moved to isolate the mosque, marking the start of the siege. A day later, on 4 July 2007, Ghazi's elder brother Abdul Aziz was arrested while attempting to escape the complex disguised in a burqa, leaving Ghazi in command of the mosque. Ghazi remained inside with a small group of students and his sister-in-law, Umme Hassan, and subsequently called for negotiations and safe passage for those remaining. His requests were denied by military officials. During the siege, he maintained communication with the outside world, giving interviews to journalists such as Hamid Mir, Absar Alam, Talat Hussain and Rageh Omaar.

On 5 July 2007, the BBC News reported that Ghazi had offered multiple ceasefires, stating that his followers would lay down their arms if government security forces stopped firing. The Pakistani government dismissed the proposal.

On 9 July 2007, ABC News reported that Ghazi again stated he was willing to surrender, but only under specific public conditions. These included granting media access to the Lal Masjid complex to demonstrate the absence of major weapons or foreign militants, a phone call with his brother Abdul Aziz, and the guarantee of a fair trial, According to the same report, the government was skeptical and denied these requests, and instead demanded an unconditional surrender. President Pervez Musharraf then issued an ultimatum, stating that "those who did not surrender would be killed.". In response, Ghazi, in a telephone interview, accused the president of seeking bloodshed. He invoked Lord Acton's dictum that "power tends to corrupt, and absolute power corrupts absolutely" to characterize Musharraf's stance.

On the morning of 10 July 2007, Prime Minister Shujaat Hussain declared that negotiations with Ghazi had failed, the military then ordered its 78th Paratrooper Brigade, 111th Infantry Brigade and the Special Service Group (SSG) to storm the mosque. However according to Fazlur Rehman Khalil, a mediator who met with Ghazi in the final hours of the siege, Ghazi was amenable to a peaceful settlement and that he had persuaded him to agree to the government's demands, culminating in a five-point agenda to end the standoff. Khalil further claimed that Ghazi had agreed to surrender and accepted a peace deal and according to him the military operation proceeded despite this agreement, resulting in Ghazi's death. Jamaat-e-Islami (JI)'s central leadership, which had also engaged in negotiations with Ghazi, stated that a peace accord was reached whereby Ghazi expressed his willingness to surrender to authorities. Mufti Naeem, one of the mediators and the head of Jamia Binoria, also stated that Ghazi had agreed to the government's demands and was preparing to depart the mosque complex when the military operation commenced. Naeem claimed, "We had succeeded in brokering an agreement and everything was agreed upon. We were staying at a house near the Lal Masjid when a military officer approached us and asked us to leave the place in 15 minutes. Soon we heard that the operation had formally been launched." In a 2013 appearance on Capital Talk with Hamid Mir, Prime Minister Shujaat Hussain later admitted that the negotiations had, in fact, been successful. He stated he was then forced to hold a press conference claiming they had failed.

In a last interview with Geo TV during the operation, Ghazi, who was hunkered down in the mosque was quoted as saying: "The government is using full force. This is naked aggression ... my murder is certain now.".

The Pakistan Ministry of Interior and Inter-Services Public Relations reported that he was killed on 10 July 2007 during Operation Sunrise. They further reported that during the final standoff, Ghazi's sister-in-law, Umme Hassan, who was present with him, was arrested. however his mother and nephew, Hassan Ghazi (Note: The son of his elder brother, Abdul Aziz and Umme Hassan), were killed.

=== Funeral and burial ===
The Pakistan Ministry of Interior added that doctors at the Pakistan Institute of Medical Sciences performed an autopsy on Ghazi's body and confirmed his identity, and pronounced him dead on arrival.

Ghazi's body was flown from PAF Base Nur Khan to PAF Base Farid near Rajanpur by a C-130 aircraft, accompanied by personnel of the Pakistan Army's Special Services Group (SSG). It was then transported by road to Basti-Abdullah in Rojhan for burial, arriving on the evening of 10 July 2007.

On 11 July 2007, more than 4,000 people gathered in Basti-Abdullah, the native village of Ghazi, for his funeral prayers. Attendees included activists and leaders from the JUI-F, JUI-S, and Sipah-e-Sahaba, among them prominent figures such as Muawiya Azam and Ali Sher Hyderi. Tribal leaders from Rahimyar Khan, Kashmore, Rajanpur, Dera Ghazi Khan, as well as representatives of the Bugti clan from Dera Bugti including Gohram Bugti and Shahzain Bugti, also joined the rites. Ghazi's brother, Abdul Aziz, led the prayers and addressed the crowd, stating, "Both my brother and I sought to enforce Shariah in this country, it was our mission. My brother, has been martyred, but I remain alive and will continue this mission until death. I will complete my brother's work."

Ghazi is buried at Jamia Abdullah Bin Ghazi, Basti-Abdullah situated a short distance from Rojhan in Rajanpur District.

=== Lal Masjid commission ===
In 2012, the Supreme Court of Pakistan established a judicial commission to investigate the 2007 Lal Masjid operation. The commission's mandate was to examine the legality of the military action and the high number of civilian casualties, including the death of Ghazi. A three-member bench, headed by Chief Justice Iftikhar Muhammad Chaudhry, was formed to oversee the case.

The Supreme Court judicial commission also ruled that the killing of Ghazi was an extrajudicial assassination.

=== Murder investigation and prosecution ===
On 2 September 2013, a first information report (FIR) was registered against Pervez Musharraf by Islamabad High Court for his role in the assassination of Ghazi during the Operation Sunrise in 2007.

On 10 October 2013, Musharraf was arrested in connection with the murder case but was later released on bail. In 2016, with several court cases still pending against him, Musharraf left Pakistan for Dubai to seek medical treatment.

In February 2016, a judge issued non-bailable warrants for the arrest of him for his 'deliberate' absence from the proceedings of the murder case. The court ordered the confiscation of his property in Islamabad and also issued a permanent arrest warrant for Musharraf and sought a Red Notice from Interpol to facilitate his extradition to Pakistan to stand trial. Musharraf died in 2023 in Dubai, where he was living in exile, without having faced trial for the charges.

== Legacy ==
According to contemporary analysts including Nadeem F. Paracha and Declan Walsh, he was significantly less hardline than his brother, often favoring diplomatic solutions. This pragmatism, however, was contrasted by his commitment to fighting until the end during the 2007 siege, which surprised some observers.

In the days following his assassination, his statement, "We can be martyred but we will not surrender," was selected as the Quote of the Day by Time magazine.

Ghazi often wore a red-and-black-patterned hat known as the Mazari cap, After his death, the hat was dubbed the "Ghazi Topi".

Ghazi's assassination ended the ten-month truce that had been established by the Waziristan Accord, which was followed by the July 2007 bombings.

In July 2008, on the first anniversary of Ghazi's assassination, a memorial ceremony was held at Lal Masjid. Attendees included thousands of students from seminaries, as well as religious leaders such as Hanif Jalandhri, Abdur Razzaq Iskander, Saleemullah Khan, Ahmed Ludhianvi, and Ali Sher Hyderi.

=== Documentary ===
In August 2007, Al Jazeera English aired a documentary titled Witness- Inside the Red Mosque, featuring reporter Rageh Omaar and directed by Farah Durrani. The film, which contained the final interview with Ghazi before his assassination, was nominated for an International Emmy Award in 2008.

=== Osama bin Laden video ===
On 20 September 2007, a new audio recording attributed to Osama bin Laden, titled "Come to Jihad," was released. In the message, bin Laden urged Pakistanis, particularly members of the military, to overthrow President Pervez Musharraf, stating that "twenty years after the soil of Pakistan soaked up the blood of one of the greatest jihadi fighters, the Imam Abdallah Azzam, today Pakistan is witness to the death of another great Muslim, Imam Abdul al-Rashid Ghazi and we in al-Qaida call on Allah to witness that we will retaliate for the blood of Imam Abdul al-Rashid Ghazi."

Ayman Al-Zawahiri also released a video titled "The Power of Truth", in which he condemned the Siege of the Red Mosque and praised Abdul Rashid Ghazi.

=== Camp Ghazi in Syria ===
In 2014, Iraqi and Syrian opposition group Jamaat Ansar al-Islam affiliated with Ahmed al-Sharaa's Jabhat Fatah al-Sham and Ahrar al-Sham named a new training camp and military subdivision after Abdul Rashid Ghazi, referring to it as "Mu'askar al-Shaikh Abdul Rasheed Ghazi" (the Sheikh Abdul Rasheed Ghazi Camp).

== Books ==
=== By him ===
- Hayat Shaheed E Islam (Urdu: حیات شہیدِ اسلام),: Maktaba Faridia, 2003. (Note: Biography of his father co-authored with Mufti Riaz Munsoor)

=== About him ===
- Nine Lives Of Pakistan. National Geographic Books, Declan Walsh (2020)
- Negotiating the Siege of the Lal Masjid, Oxford University Press, Adam Dolnik, Khuram Iqbal (2015)
- The Pakistan Anti-Hero. Vanguard Publications, Nadeem F. Paracha (2016)
- To Live Or to Perish Forever. Random House Publishers India Pvt. Limited, Nicholas Schmidle (2009)
- The China–Pakistan Axis. C Hurst & Co Publishers Ltd, Andrew Small (2015)

== See more ==
- List of Deobandis
