= Abdul Aziz Ghazi =

Pakistani religious cleric (born 1960)

Mufti Abdul Aziz Ghazi
- Abdul Aziz Ghazi in c. 2009

Chancellor and Chief Executive of Jamia Faridia
- Incumbent
- Assumed office 1998
- Preceded by: Muhammad Abdullah (Chancellor); Abdul Rashid Ghazi (Chief Executive)

Imam and Khatib of Lal Masjid
- Incumbent
- Assumed office 1998
- Preceded by: Muhammad Abdullah (Imam); Abdul Rashid Ghazi (Khatib)

Chancellor of Jamia Hafsa
- Incumbent
- Assumed office 1998
- Preceded by: Muhammad Abdullah

Personal life
- Born: 10 January 1960 (age 66) Basti-Abdullah, West Pakistan (present-day Punjab, Pakistan)
- Spouse: Umme Hassan (m. 1985)
- Children: Hassan Ghazi (died 2007)
- Parent: Muhammad Abdullah (father)
- Citizenship: Pakistani
- Education: Jamia Farooqia; Jamia Uloom-ul-Islamia
- Relations: Abdul Rashid Ghazi (brother)

Religious life
- Religion: Islam
- Denomination: Sunni
- Jurisprudence: Hanafi
- Movement: Mamati Deobandi

Muslim leader
- Teacher: Saleemullah Khan

Military service
- Allegiance: Harkat-ul-Mujahideen; 2007 Lal Masjid Miltia
- Rank: Leader of the Shura Council of Harkat-ul-Mujahideen; Emir of 2007 Lal Masjid Miltia
- Military career
- Conflicts: Soviet–Afghan War; Battle of Jaji; Siege of Lal Masjid

Abdul Aziz Ghazi (Note: Urdu: عبد العزيزغازی) (born 10 January 1960) is a Pakistani Islamic scholar belonging to the Deobandi movement within Sunni Islam, who serves as both the Imam and Khatib of Lal Masjid in Islamabad, which was the site of a siege in 2007 by the Pakistani army.

Aziz also serves as the Chancellor & Chief Executive of Jamia Faridia and Jamia Hafsa, two influential Deobandi Islamic seminaries in Islamabad.

He is the son of Muhammad Abdullah Ghazi, husband of Umme Hassan and elder brother of Abdul Rashid Ghazi.

Aziz was arrested during Operation Sunrise in July 2007, but was later released by the Supreme Court of Pakistan in 2009 and acquitted in 2013.

He preaches Deobandi jihadism and is known to closely follow Ata Ullah Shah Bukhari and Mullah Omar, and typically resists being photographed or interviewed. He has been described as having close ties with Pakistani business magnate Malik Riaz.

== Early life and education ==
He is an ethnic Baloch, whose family migrated to Punjab from Baluchistan. He is from the Sadwani clan of the Mazari tribe, in the town of Rojhan in Rajanpur, the border district of Punjab province of Pakistan. He first came to Islamabad as a six-year-old boy from his home town in Rajanpur, when his father was appointed as Imam and Khatib of Central Mosque Islamabad (Lal Masjid) in 1966.

He studied for few years at Islamabad College, a public school from where he completed his Intermediate and then joined Jamia Farooqia, where he was a student of Saleemullah Khan.

Aziz later graduated with a Dars-i Nizami degree from Jamia Uloom-ul-Islamia, a Madrasa in Karachi, It was during this time he studied alongside Ahmed Ludhianvi and Azam Tariq.

After Graduation, Aziz served as Imam of Masjid Mujaddadiyyah in F-8, Islamabad.

== Soviet–Afghan War ==
In the 1980s, amid the Soviet–Afghan War, Aziz enlisted in Harkat-ul-Mujahideen. He underwent military training at a jihadist camp located in Parachinar before being dispatched to the conflict in Afghanistan. He also served as a Leader of the Shura Council of Harkat-ul-Mujahideen.

He was active in the Zazai District of Paktia Province, engaging in combat against Soviet forces. Aziz has asserted that he met the future Taliban founder Mullah Omar during the war. According to journalist Declan Walsh, Aziz briefly persuaded his brother to join him in the conflict. However, his brother was motivated primarily by a sense of adventure rather than religious ideology and departed after only a few days.

In a 2025 podcast he claimed that he fought in the Battle of Jaji and claimed to have befriended prominent jihadist figures including Osama bin Laden, Qari Saifullah Akhtar and Fazlur Rehman Khalil. In a 2014 interview on the Pakistani news show on Dunya News, Aziz stated that he was trained at a camp operated by Khalil.

== Father's assassination ==
In October 1998, Aziz's father was assassinated in the courtyard of Lal Masjid as he was returning from teaching a class at Jamia Faridia. Aziz and his wife Umme Hassan pursued the assailant, who then fired shots at them.

The assassin escaped with the help of an accomplice waiting outside in a car. Aziz's father died of his injuries on the way to the hospital.

== Lal Masjid and seminaries ==
Following his father's assassination, Aziz succeeded him as Imam of Lal Masjid and as the Chancellor of both Jamia Faridia and Jamia Hafsa.

Most administrative duties of the seminaries were largely overseen by his younger brother, Abdul Rashid, as Aziz was more interested in political activities, and would constantly issue fatwas on various public affairs.

== 2004 Fatwa ==
In 2004, Aziz who was then serving as BPS 9 government employee issued a "fatwa" (religious decree) against the army officers who were fighting against the Taliban during the Battle of Wanna in the tribal areas close to the Afghan border. In the fatwa he declared that none of the army officers who were killed in the fighting in tribal area were martyrs and religious sanctions were not available for their funeral.

The fatwa was supported by several religious scholars, among them Aziz's close allies, Sami-ul-Haq and Nizamuddin Shamzai.

== 2007 Standoff at Lal Masjid ==
In 2007, Aziz launched an anti-vice and Shari'a campaign alongside his wife Umme Hassan by occupying a nearby library and embarking on vigilante raids through the city to stop what he called "un-Islamic activities," such as film vendors, barber shops and a Chinese-run massage parlor that he accused of being a brothel.

He warned the government of attacks in the case of a violent police operation launched against him. "If the government fails to eradicate all these moral evils from the society within the specified period of one month they (students) would themselves take actions against all the people involved in such activities," said Abdul Aziz while addressing Friday Prayer congregation. Aziz also issued a fatwa against Tourism Minister Nilofar Bakhtiar, demanding the government dismiss her from the cabinet. The fatwa was a response to a photograph of Bakhtiar with paragliders in Paris, which Aziz deemed "obscene." He characterized his work as the promotion of virtue and the prevention of vice.

On 3 July 2007, the standoff with the government ended in bloody gun battles in which some publications claim that more than 1,000 students were killed and scores wounded. The official death toll is much lower, at fewer than 300. During the siege, his son, Hassan Ghazi, was among those killed. He was a student at the Red Mosque.

== Arrest ==
On 4 July 2007 at 8:05 a.m., Aziz was arrested while leaving the complex disguised in a burqa. Aziz claims the reason for his cross-dressing escape was that he was called by a senior official of an intelligence agency with whom he has been in touch for a long time and since this man could not enter into the mosque to meet him, he asked Aziz to come down to Aabpara police station, situated on a walking distance from the mosque and asked him to wear a burqa to avoid identification.

Aziz admitted that he had done this many times before when he was declared wanted by the government.

Following his arrest, he was initially held in prison for two months before being transferred to a secure residence near Simly Dam, which had been designated a sub-jail.

In 2009, he was moved again to another mansion in the Bahria Town, a gated community near Islamabad, which was also designated a sub-jail.

== Release ==
Aziz was released on 16 April 2009 by the Supreme Court of Pakistan as he awaited trial on alleged charges of murder, incitement, and kidnapping. He was greeted by throngs of supporters. During the proceedings, Aziz was represented by his lawyer, Shaukat Aziz Siddiqui.

Since 2001, 27 different cases have been filed unsuccessfully against him.

Aziz was acquitted from all cases in 2013.

== Subsequent activities ==
Since his release he has resumed his post at Lal Masjid and has also continued to serve as Chancellor of Jamia Faridia and Jamia Hafsa.

Aziz carrying an AKS-74U while speaking at the 2024 D-Chowk Dharna against the Gaza war.

In 2010, Aziz participated in a protest organized by tribesmen from North Waziristan, opposing U.S. drone strikes in Pakistan's tribal regions. The demonstration, held at D-Chowk, included prominent figures such as General Hamid Gul and Maulana Sami-ul-Haq, who collectively demanded an end to the drone campaign.

In 2011, He was a signatory to an agreement between the Islamabad Administration and the management of Lal Masjid. The agreement allocated 20 kanals of land in Islamabad's Sector H-11 for the construction of Jamia Hafsa, as compensation for its previous madrassa building, which had been demolished in 2007.

In 2014, During peace talks between Taliban and Pakistani government, The Taliban nominated a five person team as part of their peace talks committee consisting of Aziz alongside Imran Khan, Samiul Haq and Mufti Kifayatullah. Aziz later withdrew from the committee and refused to attend future meetings with negotiators.

In 2015, Aziz was banned by the Islamabad Administration from delivering sermons in Muharram.

In 2017, Aziz filed a petition in the Islamabad High Court requesting the removal of anti-Islamic content from social media platforms within Pakistan. The petition also called on the government to sever diplomatic ties with the United States following President Donald Trump's recognition of Jerusalem as capital of Israel.

In 2020, during the COVID-19 pandemic, Aziz kept the Lal Masjid open and refused to comply with lockdown orders, stating, “Lockdowns are not the answer to these problems. We should have faith in God at this time and place their hope in Him. If death is written for you, then it will come”.

In January 2024, Aziz led the funeral prayers for Masoodur Rehman Usmani, the leader of the Sunni Ulema Council. During his address, he said: “The system will never protect you, its in the holy scripture that we have to defend ourselves.”.

In May 2024, Aziz participated in several pro-Palestinian rallies amid the Gaza war, including a weeks long sit-in at Islamabad's D-Chowk organized by Jamaat-e-Islami leader Mushtaq Ahmad.

In 2025, Aziz alongside leaders from various religious groups, organized protests following the demolition of the Madni Masjid, located on a greenbelt near Rawal Lake by the Capital Development Authority (CDA). During a speech, Aziz threatened to launch a civil disobedience movement against the government in response to the demolition.

== Books ==
- اللہ کی عظیم نعمت (Allah ki Azeem Naimat – The Great Blessing of Allah), 2005.
- اسلامی نظام کا مجوزہ خاکہ (Islami Nizam ka Mujawwiza Khaka – A Proposed Blueprint of the Islamic System), 2007.

== See also ==
- List of Deobandis
