= Umme Hassan =

Pakistani Islamic scholar and Islamist activist

Muftiyyah Umme Hassan
- أمّ حسان

Principal of Jamia Hafsa
- Incumbent
- Assumed office 1989
- Preceded by: None (office created)

Personal life
- Born: 19 June 1969 (age 57) Multan, West Pakistan (present-day Punjab, Pakistan)
- Spouse: Abdul Aziz Ghazi (m. 1985)
- Children: Hassan Ghazi (died 2007)
- Parent: Hafiz Muhammad Younas (father)
- Citizenship: Pakistani
- Relations: Muhammad Abdullah (father-in-law); Abdul Rashid Ghazi (brother-in-law)

Religious life
- Religion: Islam
- Denomination: Sunni
- Jurisprudence: Hanafi
- Movement: Deobandi
- Military career
- Conflicts: Siege of Lal Masjid (POW)

Majida Younas (Urdu: ماجدہ یونس) better known by the Kunya Umme Hassan (Urdu: أمّ حسان, lit. 'Mother of Hassan (Note: Hassan was her son who was killed in 2007 siege)') is a Pakistani Islamist activist, scholar, and principal of Jamia Hafsa, a Deobandi Islamic seminary in Islamabad.

She is the spouse of the Abdul Aziz Ghazi, the daughter-in-law of Muhammad Abdullah and sister-in-law of Abdul Rashid Ghazi.

She was arrested by Pakistan Army Special Service Group during Operation Sunrise in July 2007, but was later released by the Supreme Court of Pakistan in August 2007 and was acquitted in 2012.

== Early life and education ==
She was born in 1969 in Multan to Hafiz Muhammad Younas, a close associate of her future father-in law Muhammad Abdullah. Her family migrated to Pakistan from Jalandhar during the 1947 Partition.

Following her graduation from a Madrasa with a Dars-i Nizami degree, she married Abdul Aziz Ghazi in 1985.

In 1998, she witnessed the assassination of her father-in-law. According to her account, she and Aziz pursued the assailant, who fired shots at them before escaping in a waiting vehicle with accomplices.

== 2007 Siege of Lal Masjid ==
In January 2007, She and her husband Abdul Aziz launched an anti-vice and Shari'a campaign after the demolition of several mosques in Islamabad by the Capital Development Authority.

Following this, she directed her students to occupy a nearby children's library and then initiated vigilante actions across the city, targeting businesses they accused of promoting "un-Islamic activities." These targets included video vendors and barber shops.

On 27 June 2007, her female students from Jamia Hafsa kidnapped three Chinese nationals, who they accused of running a brothel, and seized two policemen. A day later all of the women were released after supposedly confessing to running the brothel and were shown on the television wearing burqas.

On 3 July 2007, the standoff with the government ended in bloody gun battles after which the Pakistan Army including the Pakistan Rangers, and Special Service Group (SSG) surrounded the Red Mosque and Jamia Hafsa in Islamabad. On 4 July 2007, her husband was arrested as he attempted to leave the complex while disguised in a burqa. She remained inside the besieged complex with her brother-in-law, Abdul Rashid Ghazi, and refused to surrender. During the siege, her son, Hassan Ghazi, was also killed. He was a student at the Red Mosque and the source of her kunya, Umm Hassan.

=== Arrest and release ===
During the final phase of Operation Sunrise on July 10, 2007, personnel from the Pakistan Army Special Service Group (SSG) entered a room of the Jamia Hafsa where a group of women including Umme Hassan had barricaded themself inside, she was injured and subsequently arrested after an initial refusal to surrender.

On 28 August 2007, she was released by both the Anti-Terrorism Court and the Supreme Court of Pakistan.

== Subsequent activities ==
In July 2008, on the first anniversary of the Lal Masjid siege, she organized and led the Lal Masjid Conference. The event was attended by thousands of female students from various seminaries.

In July 2008, Najam Sethi received death threats after publishing an editorial cartoon that criticized Umme Hasaan for encouraging her female students to kidnap Chinese masseuses.

In August 2008, following her visit to Karachi, Sindh Home Minister commented on her presence, stating that there was no "Talibanisation" in the city and that as a Pakistani citizen, she was free to visit. He added, "We were watching her. She is not a labelled terrorist." Subsequently, while traveling to Islamabad from Karachi, she and four of her students were among eight people injured in a road accident near Muzaffargarh.

In December 2008, she was featured in the Al Jazeera documentary "The Battle Within", and was interviewed by Rageh Omaar.

In 2011, she was a signatory to an agreement between the Islamabad Administration and the management of Lal Masjid. The agreement allocated 20 kanals of land in Islamabad's Sector H-11 for the construction of Jamia Hafsa, as compensation for its previous madrassa building, which had been demolished in 2007.

In a 2013 statement, she criticized Malala Yousafzai, suggesting her educational background was inadequate. She said that Yousafzai's idolization of U.S. President Barack Obama was evidence for this claim.

In 2016, she made an appearance in the Viceland documentary series States of Undress, hosted by Hailey Gates.

In 2020, as a counter-protest to the Aurat Azadi March, she was a key organizer of the "Haya March." The event was supported by a coalition of religious-political parties such as the Jamiat Ulema-e-Islam (JUI-F), Jamaat-e-Islami, and the Sunni Ulema Council. and under her instruction, students painted over a mural located near Lal Masjid that had been created by supporters of the Aurat March.

In November 2023, she led a protest with over 100 female students against a musical event held at Jinnah Stadium. The demonstrators, marched to a major road adjacent to the Lal Masjid and Aabpara Chowk, where they blocked traffic to voice their opposition.

In September 2024, she led a protest of more than 40 female students in Bahria Town, Rawalpindi. The protesters blocked roads to demonstrate against alleged immoral activities in the vicinity. Their primary grievance was against a massage parlour which they accused of functioning as a brothel, using its business as a front.

== 2025 Arrest and Release ==
In February 2025, she was arrested in the Shahzad Town suburb of Islamabad. The arrest was related to protest which led to a standoff over the planned demolition of Madni Masjid and nearby religious seminary. In response, protests broke out across the city and leading to the blockage of major roads, including the Srinagar Highway. In March 2025, she was granted post-arrest bail and released by the Islamabad Court.

== Books ==
- Hum Par Kya Guzri? (Urdu: ہم پر کیا گزری), 2008.
- Tamreen nahwu (Arabic: تمرین النَّحْوُ), 2021.

== See also ==
- Jamia Hafsa
