= Jamia Faridia =

Islamic university in Pakistan

Jamia Uloom Al-Islamia Al-Faridia
- جامعہ العلوم الاسلامیہ الفریدیہ
- Motto: قُلْ هَلْ يَسْتَوِی الَّذِيْنَ يَعْلَمُوْنَ وَالَّذِيْنَ لَا يَعْلَمُوْنَ
- Motto in English: Say: ‘Can those who have knowledge and those who do not be alike?’
- Type: Private Islamic University
- Established: 1971; 55 years ago
- Founder: Mawlānā Abdullah Ghazi
- Religious affiliation: Sunni Deobandi Islam
- Academic affiliations: Federation of Madaris, Pakistan
- Chancellor: Mawlānā Abdul Aziz Ghazi
- Faculty: 95 (Fall 2021)
- Students: 1,600 (Fall 2021)
- Location: Sector E-7, Islamabad Capital Territory, Pakistan; 33°43′51.5″N 73°03′03.8″E
- Campus: Urban
- Colours: Green, white
- Website: www.jamiafaridia.edu.pk

Jamia Uloom Al-Islamia Al-Faridia (Urdu: جامعہ العلوم الاسلامیہ الفریدیہ), commonly known as Jamia Faridia (Urdu: جامعه فریدیه, romanized: Jamiya Faridia), is a Deobandi Islamic university situated near the Faisal Mosque in Sector E-7 of Islamabad, Pakistan. The university was established in 1971 by Sheikh al-Hadith Mawlānā Abdullah Ghazi, who remained the Chancellor until he was assassinated by unknown gunmen in October 1998.

As of 2022, it is the largest and oldest Jamia (Islamic university) in Islamabad, and has 1,600 students and more than 95 teachers and is considered one of the leading Islamic educational institutions in Pakistan, and it attracts students from various parts of the country and from other countries as well. The seminary has produced a large number of graduates who have gone on to become prominent Islamic scholars and preachers.

== History ==
In 1966, a small seminary was established at Lal Masjid by Maulana Abdullah Ghazi, in which there were about 20 to 25 students for the Hifz class. After some time, a need was felt to have a bigger place for running this seminary so that a large number of students who were increasing with the passage of time could be accommodated.

Hence, a place in the meadows of the Margalla Hills in Sector E-7 was acquired with the help and cooperation of Seth Haroon E. H. Jaffer (Jaffer Group of Companies), Haji Akhtar Hassan (OSD Kashmir Affairs & Finance Secretary of Azad Kashmir), and Admiral Mohammad. Shariff, NI(M), HJ (Rtd). The area where the Capital Development Authority built Sector E-7 of Islamabad originally housed several small settlements and the area where the seminary was specifically constructed had originally been a village by the name of "Dhok Jeevan", which had been inhabited since the rule of the Mughal Empire, and was one of the largest of these settlements and also included the area of (what is now) The Faisal Mosque.

The construction of the seminary's current building began in 1978 and was built by Murshid Builders (Pvt) Ltd.

Maulana Abdullah served as the chancellor until his assassination by unidentified gunmen in the courtyard of Lal Masjid in October 1998.

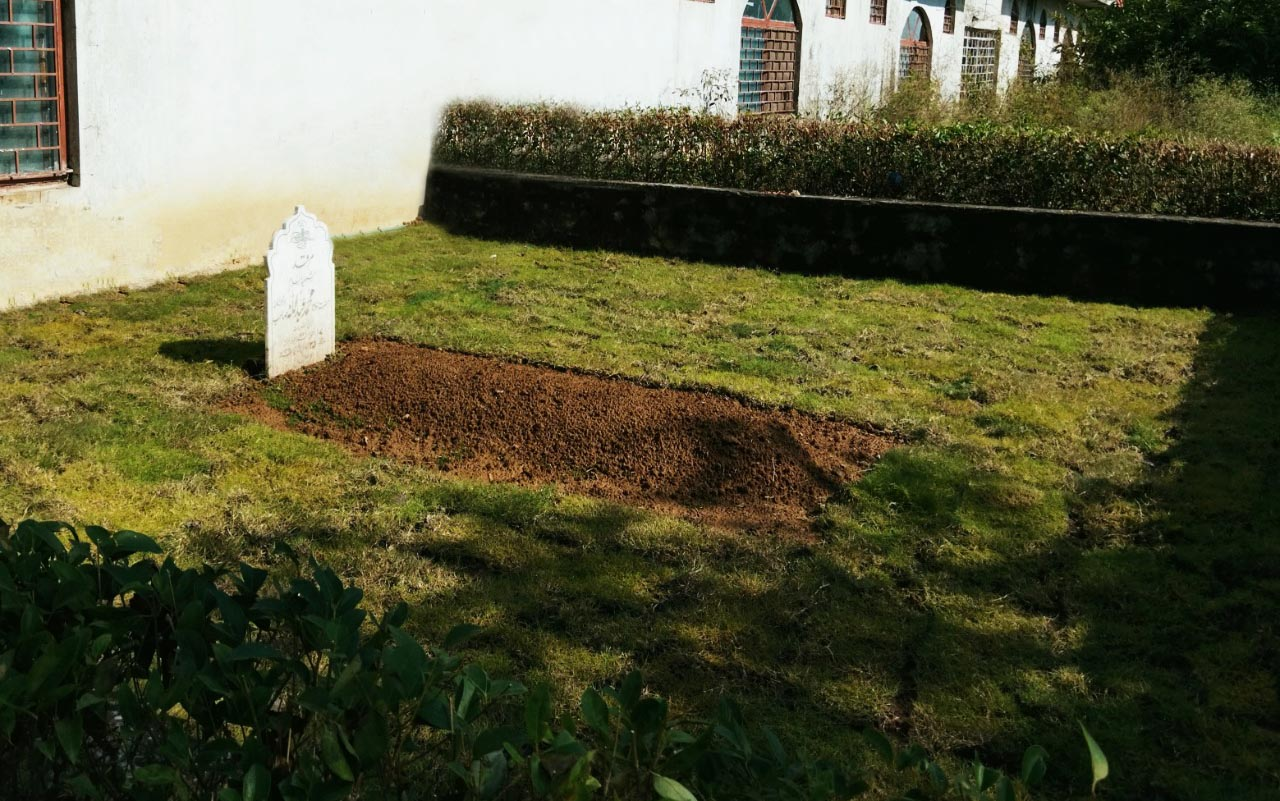
Grave of Maulana Muhammad Abdullah Ghazi at Jamia Faridia

After Maulana Abdullah's assassination, his son Abdul Rashid Ghazi, a Quaid-i-Azam University graduate and former United Nations envoy took over as Chief Executive and modernized the institution. He established the free "Al Faridia Model School" a tuition-free high school from grades 7 up until matriculation and he also introduced short courses in information technology, philosophy and Tajweed (Quranic phonetics).

Following Ghazi's 2007 assassination, his elder brother Abdul Aziz Ghazi succeeded him as both Chief Executive & Chancellor.

== Academic profile ==
=== Etymology ===
Initially called "Madrasa Arabiya Islamia", the institute underwent a name change when it was relocated to Sector E-7. It was renamed the Faridia School following the recommendation of Seth Haroon E. H. Jaffer. Eventually, it became known as Al Faridia University or Jamia Faridia.

=== Reputation and rankings ===
The institute is the largest Islamic seminary/madrasa in Islamabad and the Federation of Madaris, ranks the institute among the top 5 madaris/institutes for Islamic learning in Pakistan. It is regarded as one of the most modern madaris.

The institute has hosted several Pakistani and global personalities including Saudi Leader Abdullah Omar Nasseef, Grand Mosque Imam Sheikh Mohammad Al Subail, Pakistani scientist Dr. Abdul Qadeer Khan, politicians and scholars such as Mufti Taqi Usmani, Hafiz Hamdullah, Zahid Ur Rashdi, Masroor Nawaz, Qibla Ayaz, Moavia Azam, Mazhar Saeed Shah and Hanif Jalandhari.

=== Academic degrees ===
The seminary is recognized for its extensive curriculum, which includes traditional Dars-i Nizami studies, Arabic language, Quranic studies, Islamic jurisprudence, Hadith studies, Islamic history, and other related subjects. Its certificates are issued to students under the Federation of Madaris, and its Dars-i Nizami degree is equivalent to a Master of Arts in Islamic studies.

The following certificates are issued by the Institute:

- Certificate of Hafiz-ul-Qur'an (Memorizing the Noble Qur'an)
- Certificate of Secondary (Equivalent Matriculation)
- Certificate of Higher Secondary (Equivalent Bachelor of Fine Arts)
- Certificate of Higher Education (Equivalent Bachelor of Arts in Arabic or Islamic studies)
- Certificate of Dars-i Nizami (Equivalent Master of Arts in Islamic studies)

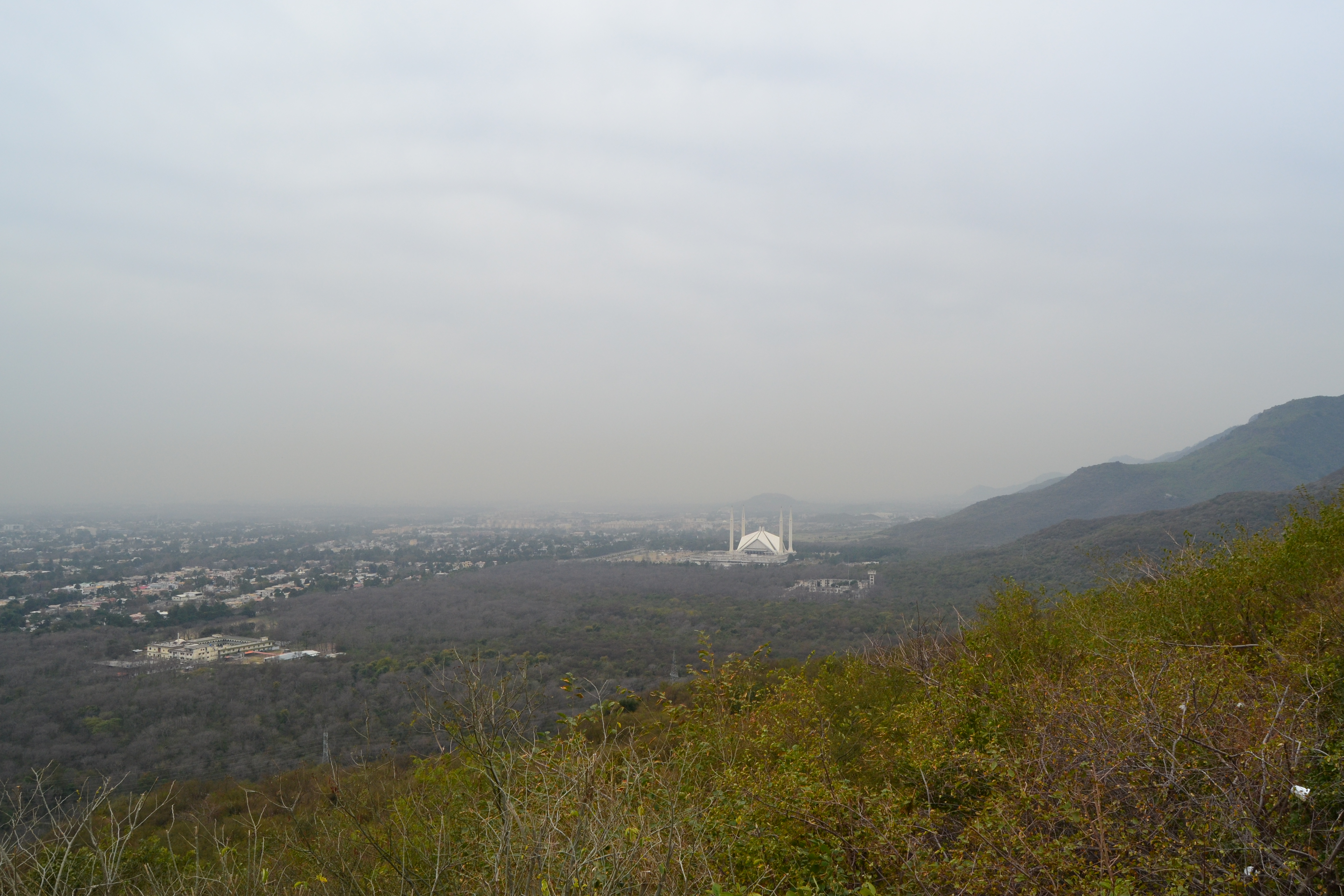
View of Jamia Faridia (Left) and Faisal Mosque from Daman-e-Koh, Islamabad

== Campus ==
The institute has a large campus with modern facilities, including a mosque, lecture halls, library, computer lab, dining halls and residence halls for students.

The campus is located north east of Hill Side Road in sector E-7 of Islamabad, around 1.5 km east of Faisal Mosque, and at the foothills of the Margalla Hills, the westernmost foothills of the Himalayas, putting it at the northernmost end of the city. It is located on an elevated area of land.

The campus has been divided into four sections, each named after one of the four Rashidun caliphs.

=== Jamia Masjid Abdullah Ghazi ===
Historically before the construction of the institute, an old mosque named Toobah Mosque was constructed by nearby village residents. However, the mosque was later incorporated into the institute and was expanded into a Jamia Mosque which was later re-named to Jamia Masjid Abdullah Ghazi Shaheed.

=== The Al Faridia High School ===
The Al Faridia High School is a public high school which offers students classes from 7th till the matriculation, and was established by Maulana Abdul Rashid Ghazi.

A view of Jamia Faridia from Daman-e-Koh

=== Library ===
Named after the renowned intellectual center in Baghdad during the Islamic Golden Age, the Bayt al-Ḥikmah Library is situated across from the main building. The library has over three thousand books and journals, including the complete 32-volume set of Encyclopædia Britannica.

=== Darul Iftaa Advisory Council ===
The seminary houses a Darul Iftaa, also known as the Institute of Islamic Jurisprudence, where a panel of muftis scholars conduct research and provide Islamic guidance and fatwas on a range of personal, social, and global issues. This institute also operates a branch at Lal Masjid.

=== Maktaba Faridia ===
Maktaba Faridia is a bookstore and publisher that is a subsidiary company of Jamia Faridia. It was founded in 1982 to help students get their academic books and other accessories.

=== AQ Khan Forest Trail ===
In 2002, Abdul Rashid Ghazi extended an invitation to Pakistani scientist Abdul Qadeer Khan to attend the Khatam-e-Bukhari ceremony at Jamia Faridia. Subsequently, Khan facilitated the creation of a forest pedestrian path leading from the seminary to Faisal Mosque, which was named AQ Khan Forest Trail in his honor, it is maintained by the seminary administration.

=== Dhok Jeevan Forest Trail ===
Trail 4, often referred to as the Dhok Jeevan Forest Trail—named after the historic village that once existed in the area prior to the establishment of Islamabad—also passes behind Jamia Faridia and is frequently used by the seminary's students.

== Branches ==
The institute has a separate women's branch, known as Jamia Syeda Hafsa, located adjacent to Lal Masjid in Islamabad, which is considered as the largest women's madrasa in Pakistan.

Additional branches include Jamia Abdullah Bin Ghazi, in Basti-Abdullah, Rojhan.

== Notable alumni ==
- Dr Husain Abdul Sattar, Professor of Pathology at the University of Chicago.

== See also ==
- Jamia Hafsa
- Lal Masjid
