= Shaukat Aziz Siddiqui =

Pakistani jurist (born 1959)

Justice of the Islamabad High Court
- In office 21 November 2011 – 11 October 2018

Personal details
- Born: 1 July 1959 (age 67) Rawalpindi, Pakistan
- Education: University of the Punjab

Shaukat Aziz Siddiqui (Urdu: شوکت عزيز صدیقی; born 1 July 1959) is a Pakistani jurist and former senior Justice of the Islamabad High Court.

== Early life and education ==
He was born on 1 July 1959 in Rawalpindi, Pakistan. He completed his early education from Gordon College, Rawalpindi. He then went to the University of the Punjab for LLB and MBA.

== Judicial career ==
He started his career as an advocate of district courts in 1988. He was elevated to the advocate of High Court in 1990 and advocate of Supreme Court of Pakistan in 2001.

In the aftermath of the 2007 military operation against Lal Masjid, he served as the defense attorney for the mosque's leader, Abdul Aziz Ghazi.

He won the election in 2011 and became President of High Court Bar Association, Rawalpindi. On 21 November 2011, he was elevated as Justice of Islamabad High Court.

=== Removal ===
In 2018, Siddiqui accused Inter-Services Intelligence (ISI) for designing a coup against the government of Nawaz Sharif. Later, in October, he was removed as Justice of the Islamabad High Court by the recommendations of Supreme Judicial Council of Pakistan to the President of Pakistan.

However, on 22 March 2024, Supreme Court ruled that the dismissal of former Islamabad High Court (IHC) judge Shaukat Aziz Siddiqui was "unlawful." The verdict was announced by a five-member bench, led by Qazi Faez Isa after being reserved on 23 January.
