= The Pakistan Anti-Hero =

Novel by Nadeem Farooq Paracha

The Pakistan Anti-Hero is a book written by Pakistani author, journalist, cultural critic and satirist, Nadeem Farooq Paracha. It is his second book. His first book, End of the Past was published in 2016 by Vanguard Publications. His second book too is published by Vanguard. The Pakistan Anti-Hero is an extension of Paracha's first book in which he mapped the political evolution of Pakistani society. In his second book, he attempts to navigate the evolution of Pakistani nationalism through the study of a number of Pakistani intellectuals, artistes, sportsmen, scholars and militants.
