= Muhammad Abdullah Ghazi =

Pakistani Islamic scholar and political figure (1935-1998)

Sheikh al-Hadīṯh Mufti Muhammad Abdullah Ghazi محمد عبد اللہ غازی
- Muhammad Abdullah Ghazi in c. 1992

1st Chancellor of Jamia Faridia
- In office 1971 – 17 October 1998
- Preceded by: None (office created)
- Succeeded by: Abdul Aziz Ghazi

Imam and Khatib of Lal Masjid
- In office 1967 – 17 October 1998
- Preceded by: None (office created)
- Succeeded by: Abdul Aziz Ghazi (Imam); Abdul Rashid Ghazi (Khatib)

Chairman of Ruet-e-Hilal Committee
- In office 1975 – 17 October 1998
- Preceded by: None (office created)
- Succeeded by: Muneeb-ur-Rehman

Patron of Wifaq-ul-Madaris al-Arabia
- In office 1980 – 17 October 1998
- Preceded by: Mufti Mehmood
- Succeeded by: Fazl-ur-Raheem Ashrafi

1st Chancellor of Jamia Hafsa
- In office 1989 – 17 October 1998
- Preceded by: None (office created)
- Succeeded by: Abdul Aziz Ghazi

Member of Council of Islamic Ideology
- In office 1980 – 17 October 1998

Member of 1981 Majlis-e-Shoora of Parliament of Pakistan
- In office 1981–1988

Grand Mufti and Federal Khatib of Islamabad
- In office 1993 – 17 October 1998
- Preceded by: None (office created)
- Succeeded by: Vacant

Personal life
- Born: 1 June 1935 (c. 29th Safar 1354 AH) Basti-Abdullah, Balochistan, British Raj
- Died: 17 October 1998 (aged 63)(c. 26th Jumada al-Thani 1419 AH) Lal Masjid, Islamabad, Pakistan
- Cause of death: Assassination
- Resting place: Jamia Faridia, Islamabad; 33.7311462, 73.0517133
- Home town: Basti-Abdullah, Rajanpur
- Children: Abdul Aziz Ghazi; Abdul Rashid Ghazi
- Citizenship: British Indian (1935–1947); Pakistani (1947–1998)
- Education: Jamia Uloom-ul-Islamia; Jamia Qasim-ul-Uloom
- Relations: Umme Hassan (daughter-in-law)
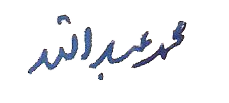
- Signature

Religious life
- Religion: Islam
- Denomination: Sunni
- Jurisprudence: Hanafi
- Movement: Deobandi

Muslim leader
- Teacher: Allama Yusuf Banuri; Mufti Mehmood-ur-Rehman; Mufti Muhammad Shafi
- Students: Awrangzib Faruqi Manzoor Mengal Atta-ur-Rehman

Muhammad Abdullah Ghazi (Urdu: محمد عبد اللہ غازی c. 1 June 1935 – 17 October 1998) was a Pakistani Deobandi Islamic scholar, theologian of the Hanafi school of Islamic jurisprudence, and a political figure. He held several key positions, including the Chairman of Ruet-e-Hilal Committee, the first Imam and Khatib of Lal Masjid in Islamabad, the Chancellor of Jamia Faridia and Jamia Hafsa, the Patron-in-Chief of Wifaq Al Madaris Al Arabiyah and Jamia Mohammadia, member of both the Aalmi Majlis Tahaffuz Khatm-e-Nubuwwat and Council of Islamic Ideology, the President of Markazi Jamiat Ahlus-Sunnat wal-Jama'ah and Idara Alia Tanzeem ul Madaris, member of 1981 Majlis-e-Shoora during the Presidency of Muhammad Zia-ul-Haq and as Federal Khatib under President Farooq Leghari in the 29th and 36th Cabinet of Pakistan.

Ghazi was an alumnus of Jamia Uloom-ul-Islamia and had studied under various scholars including Allama Yusuf Banuri, Mufti Mehmood, and Mufti Muhammad Shafi. He later taught notable students such as Aurangzeb Farooqi, Manzoor Mengal, and Atta-ur-Rehman and was also considered a mentor to Fazal-ur-Rehman.

He was personally appointed by President Ayub Khan to serve as the first Imam and Khatib of Central Mosque Islamabad (Lal Masjid), the first mosque established in Pakistan's new capital, Islamabad.

Ghazi was a close associate of Muhammad Zia-ul-Haq, a military dictator who became the sixth President of Pakistan, and served as one of his key advisors on religious affairs and was awarded the Sitara-i-Imtiaz in 1986. He played a significant role in the establishment of Pakistan's Zakat Councils and contributed to the drafting of the Zakat and Ushr Ordinance of 1980. Ghazi was also a key proponent of the proposed Fifteenth Amendment to the Constitution of Pakistan in August 1998.

Ghazi played a significant role in establishing and supporting mosques and madrasas across the country.

In 1971, he founded Jamia Faridia in Islamabad, the first Islamic seminary to be established in Islamabad. He taught the Kutub al-Sitta including Ṣaḥīḥ al-Bukhārī at the madrasah, and was known by the title "Shaykh al-Hadith".

On 17 October 1998, Ghazi was assassinated by unknown assailants while approaching Lal Masjid after teaching a class at Jamia Faridia.

== Early life and education ==
Muhammad Abdullah Ghazi was born on 1 June 1935 (29th Safar 1354 AH) during the British Raj in the village of Basti-Abdullah, Rajanpur District into the family of Ghazi Muhammad descending from the Sadwani (Sodvani) clan of the Mazari tribe of Baluchistan. a part of Baloch diaspora who migrated to Punjab from Baluchistan.

His father, a farmer, was socially active in the village. Due to his activities, he faced multiple arrests by the British Indian authorities and was eventually sentenced to eight years in prison. During his imprisonment, he became more religious and encouraged his son to attend a local madrassa.

In 1946, Ghazi began his religious education at Madrasa Khudam-ul-Qur'an in Rahim Yar Khan, where he completed the Hifz (memorization of the Quran).

In 1948, after completing his primary education, Ghazi enrolled at Jamia Qasim Ul Uloom in Multan for further education, where he studied for 5 years and was a student of Mufti Mehmood.

Afterward, he enrolled at Jamia Uloom-ul-Islamia in Karachi, where he completed the Dars-i Nizami curriculum and graduated in 1957 as one of the top students of Muhammad Yousuf Banuri.

After graduating, he served as the imam of Jamia Masjid Rashidiya in Malir Town for several years. During this time, he was also a member of the advisory committee for Bayyināt, a monthly journal published by Jamia Uloom-ul-Islamia.

== Lal Masjid ==
When the Capital of Pakistan was moved from Karachi to Islamabad, and the first congregational mosque (Lal Masjid) was established, Ghazi became its first sermon preacher in 1967 upon the recommendation of his teacher Muhammad Yousuf Banuri.

1971 postcard of the Lal Masjid.

Ghazi's sermons drew in thousands of worshippers including prominent political figures such as Prime Minister Balakh Sher Mazari and Presidents of Pakistan including Ghulam Ishaq Khan, Farooq Leghari as well as General Zia-ul-Haq who was a regular visitor to the mosque as before the completion of the Faisal Mosque, The Lal Masjid had been the only main congregational mosque in the city. Located in a very central position, the mosque lies in close proximity to the Presidential Palace and Prime Minister's Office.

In 1976, as part of his six-day state visit to Pakistan, King Khalid of Saudi Arabia also visited the Lal Masjid in Islamabad, where he prayed behind Ghazi, and it was during this visit he initiated the construction of King Faisal Mosque in Islamabad and toured the nearby seminary, Jamia Faridia.

== 1974 Khatm-e-Nubuwwat movement ==
In 1974, Ghazi became associated with the Aalmi Majlis Tahaffuz Khatm-e-Nubuwwat (AMTKN), a religious organization dedicated to upholding the doctrine of the finality of prophethood in Islam. He played a prominent role in mobilizing support for the Tehreek-e-Tahafuz-e-Khatm-e-Nubuwwat and during this period, Lal Masjid served as a key gathering site for rallies and meetings related to the campaign. Key leaders of the campaign, Mufti Mahmood and Allama Yusuf Banuri, had both been Ghazi's teachers.

The movement ultimately contributed to the passage of the Second Amendment to the Constitution of Pakistan.

== Idara Alia Tanzeem ul Madaris ==
In 1970, he founded the Idara Alia Tanzeem ul Madaris (Urdu: ادارہ عالیہ تنظیم المدارس), an organization dedicated to securing land for the construction of mosques and religious institutions, and served as its first chairman. His efforts focused on both rural and urban areas, including the construction of the Grand Mosque of Kalur Kot and several mosques within Islamabad.

In 1988, he co-founded Jamia Mohammadia alongside Maulana Zahoor Ahmed Alvi, a close associate. The seminary is the second-largest madrasa in Islamabad, He served as the institution's first patron-in-chief.

== Ruet-e-Hilal Committee ==
In 1975, He was appointed as the first chairman of the newly established Ruet-e-Hilal Committee, a government body operating under the Ministry of Religious Affairs, responsible for announcing the sighting of the new moon, which determines the Islamic calendar and Islamic holidays.

Ghazi served in this position until his death, after which he was succeeded by Mufti Muneeb-ur-Rehman.

== 1977 Nizam-e-Mustafa movement ==
In 1977, Ghazi played a prominent role in the Nizam-e-Mustafa movement, a populist Islamist campaign demanding the replacement of Zulfikar Ali Bhutto's secular socialist government with an Islamic system of governance in Pakistan.

Emerging as a vocal opponent of Bhutto, Ghazi organized and participated in large-scale demonstrations alongside leaders of Jamiat Ulema-e-Islam (JUI), including his teacher and mentor, Mufti Mehmood.

== Wifaq-ul-Madaris ==
In 1979, Ghazi was appointed as the Patron-in-Chief of Wifaq-ul-Madaris al-Arabia, and as the regional supervisor for all madrassas registered under the educational board in Islamabad and Rawalpindi.

Ghazi played a key role in establishing Markazi Jamiat Ahle Ahlus-Sunnah wal-Jama'ah, an organization representing the Deobandi ulema. The group aimed to raise awareness and advocate for issues concerning madaris (Islamic seminaries). Ghazi served as its first president before being succeeded by his deputy and close associate, Maulana Zahoor Ahmed Alvi.

== Majlis-e-Shoora ==
In 1981, President Zia-ul-Haq established an advisory council to the president (1981 Majlis-e-Shoora), members of the Shoora were appointed directly by Zia, who selected Ghazi as one of his chief advisors on religious affairs.

== 1980 Zakat ordinance ==
Ghazi played a pivotal role in the creation of Pakistan's Zakat Councils and contributed to drafting the Zakat and Ushr Ordinance of 1980.

The ordinance was officially promulgated by President Zia-ul-Haq during a ceremony at Lal Masjid in June 1980.

== Establishing Jamia Faridia ==
In 1966, He established a small seminary at Lal Masjid, in which there were about 20 to 25 students for the Hifz class. After some time a need was felt to have a bigger place for running this seminary so that a large number of students who were increasing with the passage of time could be accommodated.

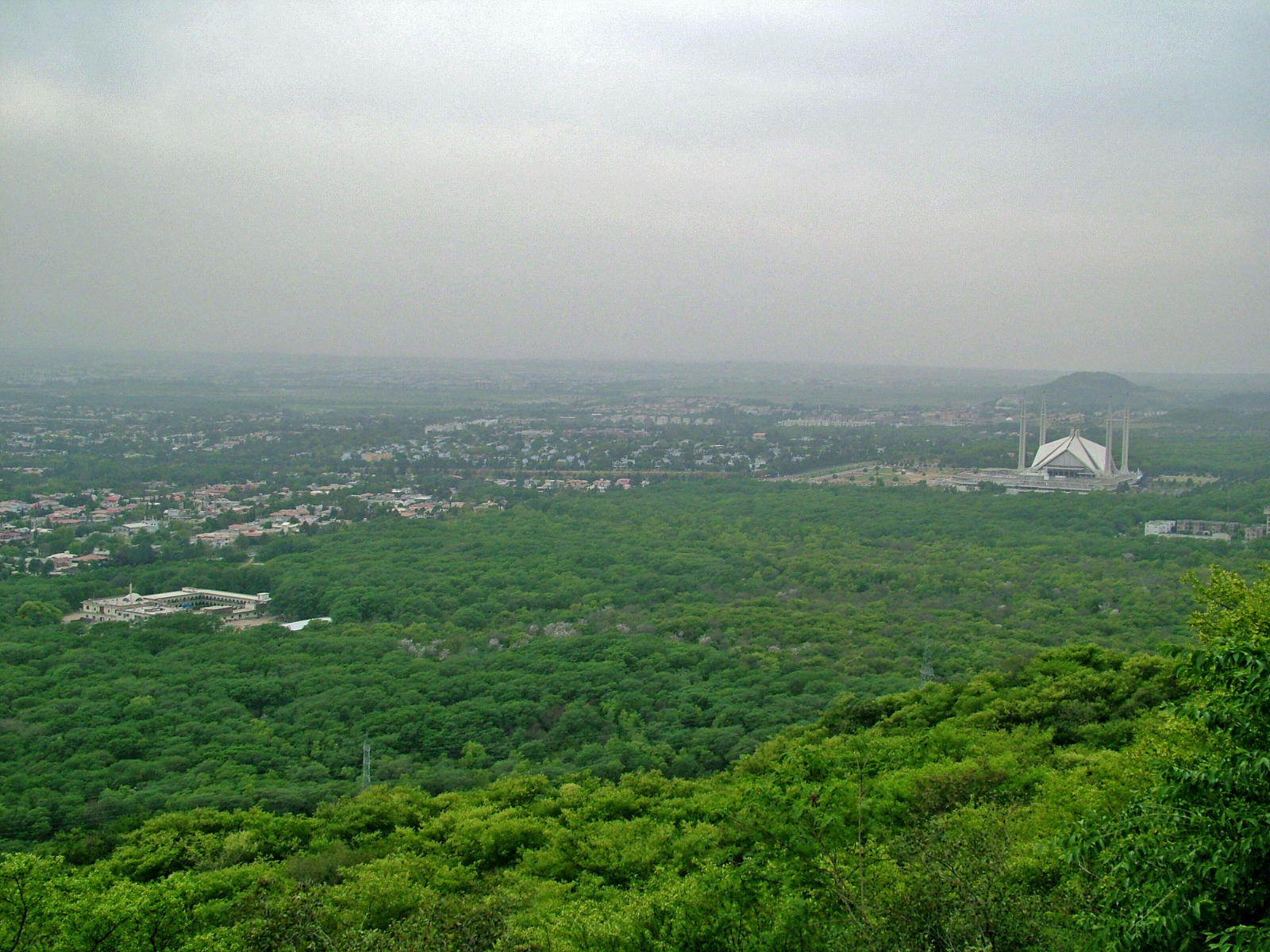
View of Jamia Faridia (Left) and Faisal Mosque from Daman-e-Koh, Islamabad

Hence In 1971, a place in the meadows of the Margalla Hills in the city's Prime Sector of E-7, was acquired by Ghazi's Idara Alia Tanzeem ul Madaris with the help and cooperation of several of his close friends most notably Seth Haroon Jaffer (Jaffer Group of Companies), Haji Akhtar Hassan (OSD Kashmir Affairs & Finance Secretary of Azad Kashmir), and Admiral Mohammad. Shariff, NI(M), HJ (Rtd).

The construction of the seminary's present building was completed in 1984 and was officially named "Jamia Faridia".

The seminary was the first ever educational institute to be registered with Wifaq-ul-Madaris.

== Faisal Mosque ==
In 1986, following the completion of the Faisal Mosque, President Zia-ul-Haq invited Ghazi to serve as the mosque's first imam.

Ghazi declined the offer, choosing instead to continue his role as the Imam and Khatib of Lal Masjid, where he had already established himself as a prominent religious leader and had a significant following. Ghazi did however lead the inaugural prayer at the newly constructed mosque on 18 June 1988.

== Establishing Jamia Hafsa ==
In 1989, he laid the foundation for Jamia Syeda Hafsa, as the women's branch of Jamia Faridia. Located adjacent to the Lal Masjid near Aabpara, the institution was built on 7,500 square yards of land.

The seminary is the largest women's madrasa in Pakistan.

== Federal Khatib ==
In 1993, During the Second Benazir Bhutto government, President Farooq Leghari appointed Ghazi as the Federal (Wifaqi) Khatib of Islamabad, a government position under the Ministry of Religious Affairs and Islamabad Auqaf Department equivalent to that of the Additional Secretary of the Federal Government, which was established to supervise the mosques within the capital city.

Ghazi continued to serve in this position during the Second Nawaz Sharif government.

== Afghanistan Tour ==
In 1997, Ghazi, along with a delegation of Deobandi scholars, was invited as a state guests by Afghanistan's Supreme Leader, Mullah Omar.

During his visit, Ghazi toured several Deobandi madrasas in Kabul and met Mullah Omar, Osama bin Laden, and Ayman al-Zawahiri in Kandahar.

== Assassination and legacy ==
According to his biographer, Mufti Riaz Munsoor, Ghazi had a strict schedule that he followed every day. He would walk seven kilometers from his home to his seminary, Jamia Faridia, where he would give lectures to his students. on his way back, he would stop at the Polyclinic Hospital to bless the patients and offer them words of encouragement.

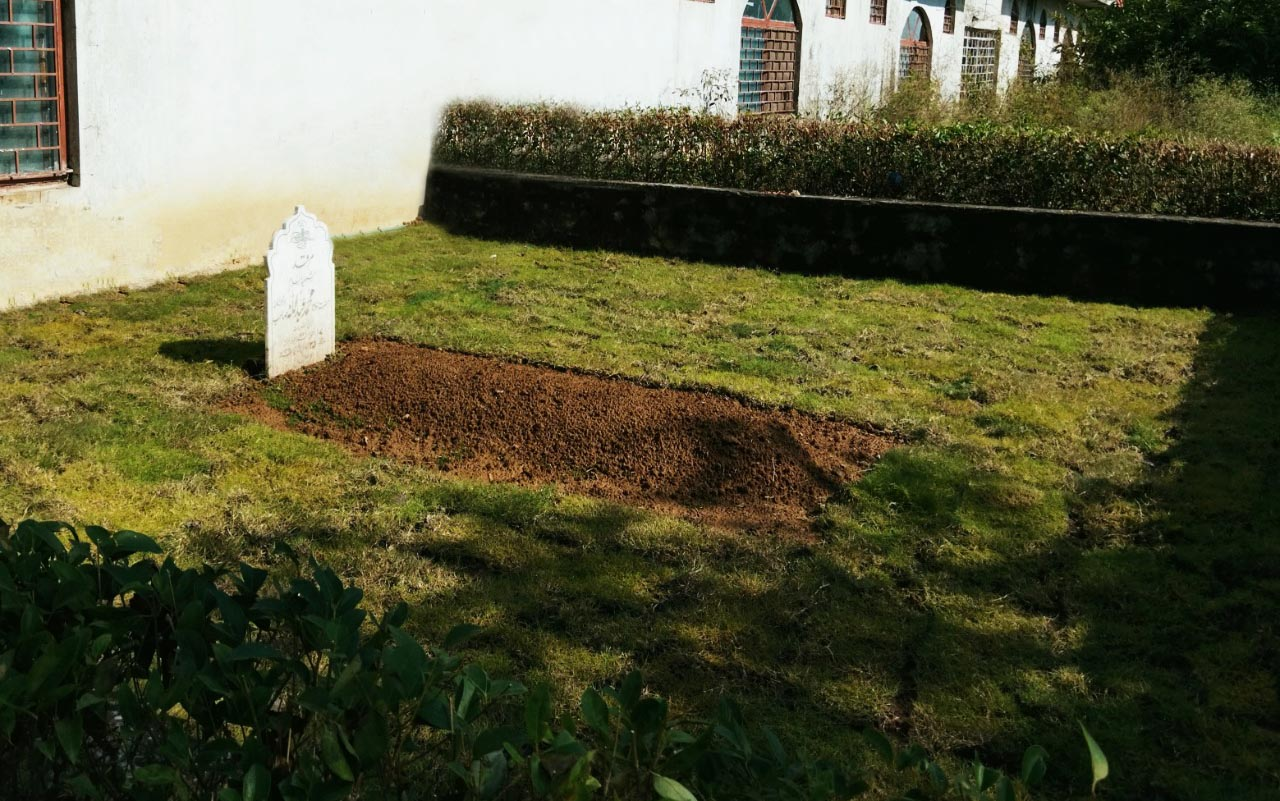
Grave of Ghazi at Jamia Faridia

On October 17, 1998, the day of his assassination, Ghazi maintained his usual routine. He walked to Jamia Faridia to deliver lectures to his students and later stopped at a hospital on his way back. As he approached Lal Masjid, a man was waiting for him in the courtyard. The assailant greeted Ghazi before suddenly drawing a gun and firing an entire magazine at him. The assassin escaped with the aid of accomplices waiting in a getaway car.

Severely wounded, Ghazi succumbed to his injuries on the way to the same hospital he had visited earlier. Despite being aware of threats against his life, he had consistently refused bodyguards, believing it was better to die alone than endanger others. He is buried in the courtyard of Jamia Faridia, Islamabad.

The President of Pakistan Rafiq Tarar expressed his sadness over the assassination in a letter, adding that "Maulana Abdullah Ghazi had spent his whole life for Islam, and kept the tradition of Ulema alive, his struggles will forever be remembered".

Jamia Masjid Abdullah Ghazi (Urdu: جامع مسجد عبد اللہ غازی) in Sector E-7 of Islamabad is named after him.

In his honor his hometown was also renamed "Basti-Abdullah" and a new seminary named after him was also constructed there, the town gained worldwide attention in 2007 when Abdul Rashid Ghazi was buried in the courtyard of the seminary,

Abdullah Railway Station near the town is also named after him.

== Investigation ==
Due to a lack of confidence in Pakistan's legal system, Abdul Aziz, the elder son of Ghazi, initially declined to file a First Information Report (FIR). However, his younger son, Abdul Rashid, proceeded to file the FIR, prompting a police investigation into the case. After persistent efforts, a suspect was arrested and subsequently identified by an eyewitness during an identification parade.

Despite this, the suspect was inexplicably released the following day. Abdul Rashid protested the release, warning the authorities that he would pursue legal action if the suspect was not promptly re-arrested. As pressure mounted, he reportedly faced threats, including a warning to withdraw the case or risk suffering a fate similar to that of his father. According to those close to him, this experience marked a turning point in Abdul Rashid Ghazi's life, leading to his disillusionment with the legal system.

== Memoir ==
In 2005, a memoir was published by Maktaba Faridia detailing his life under the name Hayat Shaheed E Islam (Urdu: حیات شہیدِ اسلام) Written by Mufti Riaz Munsoor.

== See more ==
- List of Deobandis
- List of Hanafis
