= Madni Masjid, Islamabad =

Mosque and seminary complex located in Islamabad, Pakistan

Madni Masjid
- مدنی مسجد
- Location within Islamabad

Religion
- Affiliation: Sunni Islam
- Sect: Deobandi
- Status: Active (Demolished in August 2025 and Rebuilt in November 2025)

Location
- Location: Murree Road, near Rawal Dam Chowk, Islamabad, Pakistan
- Interactive map of Madni Masjid
- Administration: Capital Development Authority (CDA)
- Coordinates: 33.68250383582925°N 73.10296053743707°E

Architecture
- Type: Mosque architecture
- Established: 1982
- Destroyed: August 2025

Madni Masjid (Note: also referred to as Masjid-e-Madni) (Urdu: مدنی مسجد) is a mosque complex located on Murree Road near the Rawal Dam in Islamabad, Pakistan.

It drew national attention in August 2025 when the Capital Development Authority (CDA) demolished it as part of the enforcement of building regulations, sparking widespread protests and subsequent negotiations with religious groups that led reconstruction of the mosque on the same site.

== Background and demolition ==
Located along Murree Road, near Rawal Dam Chowk, the site included a mosque as well as an adjoining madrassa. Authorities maintained that both structures were constructed without proper approval and encroached upon protected greenbelt land.

In February 2025, Umme Hassan, the wife of Lal Masjid imam Abdul Aziz Ghazi, was arrested in Shahzad Town suburb of Islamabad. The arrest was connected to a protest she led against the planned demolition of the mosque. She was granted post-arrest bail and released by an Islamabad court in March 2025.

In the late hours of 9–10 August 2025, CDA authorities, supported by law enforcement, demolished the mosque and seminary. The clearing was part of a broader crackdown on over a hundred unauthorized constructions throughout the city. Following the demolition, saplings were planted on the cleared greenbelt.

== Protests ==
Religious groups swiftly protested by uprooting newly planted vegetation and conducting prayers at the site. Multiple FIRs were filed against officials including the Interior Minister, CDA Chairman, and police officers under sections relating to blasphemy and destruction of sacred property. Assertions arose from clerics alleging further plans to demolish as many as 50 mosques in Islamabad, claims the administration denied. Following the demolition, Abdul Aziz Ghazi, the imam of Lal Masjid, organized public protests and threatened to initiate a campaign of civil disobedience against the government.

Following heightened tensions Religious groups initiated reconstruction of the mosque using remaining bricks and conducted Friday congregational prayers at the demolition site. A symbolic structure was erected amid the protest. Negotiations took place involving the Islamabad administration and clerical representatives, including JUI-F leaders Maulana Abdul Ghafoor Haideri and Mufti Owais Aziz.

== Reconstruction agreement ==
On 20 August 2025, a formal agreement was reached: the mosque would be reconstructed on its original site within four months, a temporary tent would be provided for daily prayers, and future mosque-related matters in Islamabad would involve consultation with religious representatives.
