= Basti-Abdullah =

Basti Abdullah بستی عبداللہ
- Town
- Top: Mosque at the entrance of the Town; Bottom left: The Grand Mosque of the Town; Bottom right: Entrance to Madrasa Abdullah Bin Ghazi; Bottom: Grave of Abdul Rashid Ghazi
- Location within Punjab, Pakistan Location within Pakistan Location within Sindh
- Coordinates: 28°37′55″N 69°53′18″E
- Country: Pakistan
- Province: (Punjab, Pakistan) Punjab
- District: Rajanpur
- Named for: Maulana Muhammad Abdullah
- Time zone: UTC+5 (PST)
- Highways: N-55 (Indus Highway)

Basti-Abdullah (Urdu: بستی عبداللہ, romanized: Basti-Abdullah lit. 'Settlement of Abdullah') also known as the Abdullah Shaheed Town (Urdu: عبداللہ شہید ٹاؤن) is a Town situated a short distance from Rojhan in Rajanpur District, the border district of Punjab province in Pakistan.

The town is named after Maulana Muhammad Abdullah and is also noted for being the resting place of Abdul Rashid Ghazi, It is about halfway between Rajanpur to the northeast, and Kashmore to the southwest just off of the Indus Highway.

== Etymology ==
The town, in flat, cotton-growing area and the nearby train station, are both named after Maulana Muhammad Abdullah.

== Education ==
In 2002, a religious school, was established by Abdul Rashid Ghazi, which was named "Madraseh Abdullah Bin Ghazi".

It is a branch of Jamia Faridia University, Islamabad where students are taught Hifz (memorizing the Noble Qur'an) and Tajwid (Quranic Phonetics), as of 2021 the seminary has 130 students.

== Abdul Rashid Ghazi Grave ==
The town and the Madrasa came into the limelight on July 11, 2007 when hundreds of people gathered in the town for the funeral and burial of Abdul Rashid Ghazi who was killed when security forces stormed his mosque complex after a week-long standoff.

== Railway Station ==
The Basti Abdullah Railway Station was first established during the British Raj as part of the Great Indian Peninsula Railway, however it was later incorporated into Main Line 2 (Kotri–Attock Line), and heavy remodeling of the station was completed around 1972 by the Ministry of Railways.

== Demographics ==
=== Languages ===
Balochi Language and Urdu are the most widely spoken languages in Basti Abdullah.

== Notable residents ==
- Abdul Rashid Ghazi
- Mawlānā Abdul Aziz

== Gallery ==
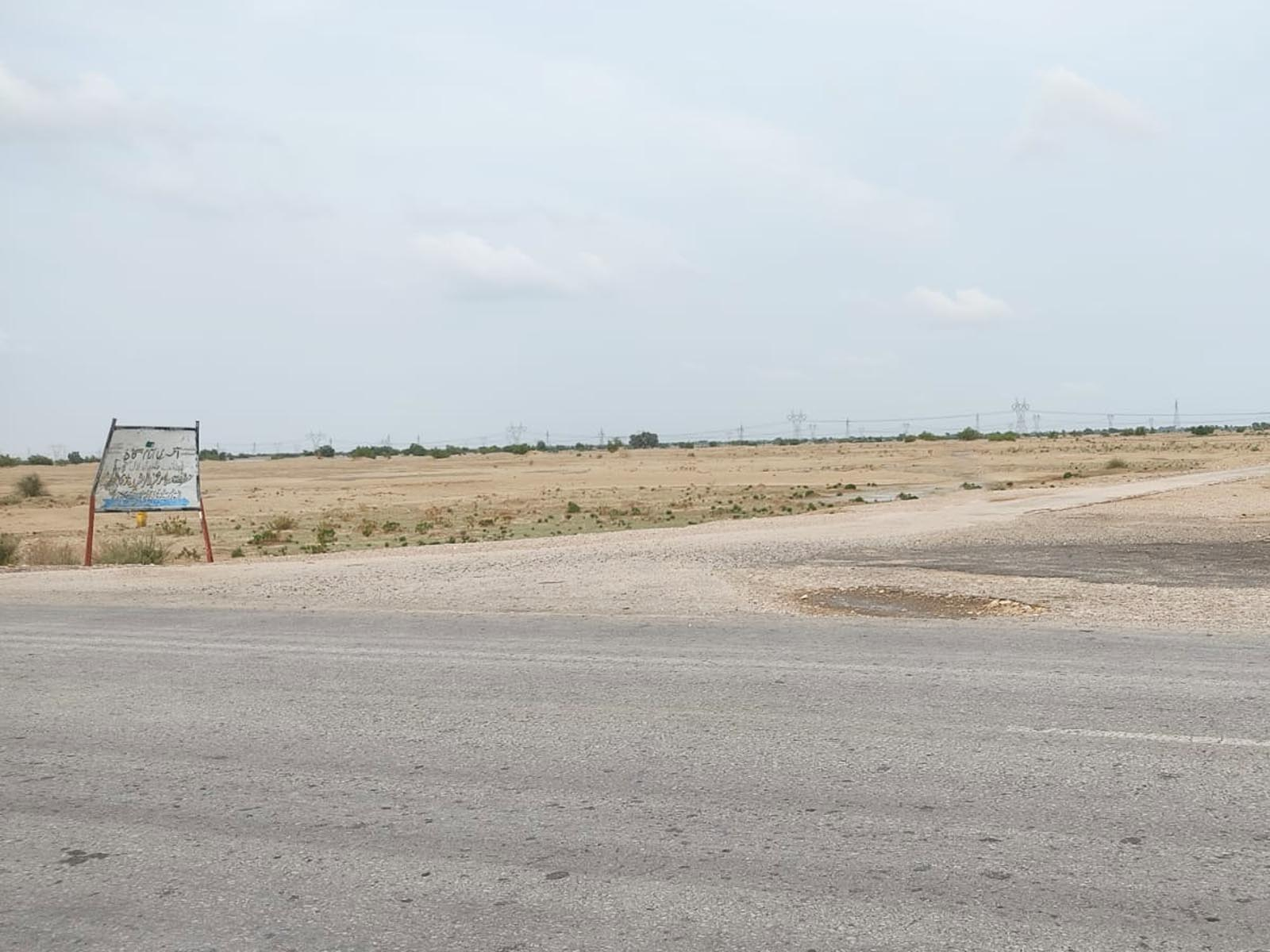
Road branching off the Indus Highway towards the town.

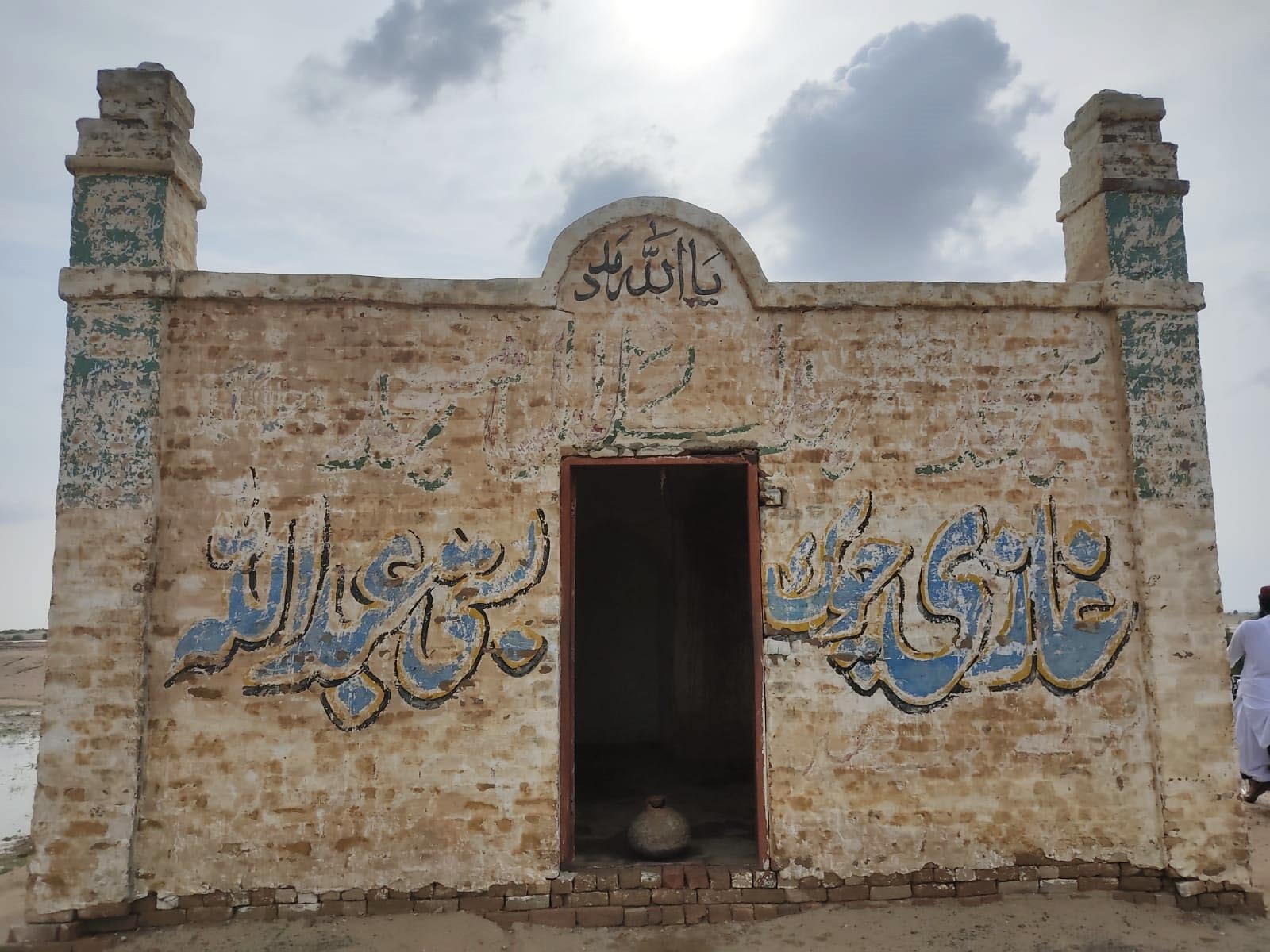
Ghazi Chowk Masjid, located at the entrance of the town just off the Indus Highway.
