= July 2007 Pakistan bombings =

Bombings in Pakistan after the Lal Masjid siege

- Part of the War in North-West Pakistan
- Location of incidents shown in the map of Pakistan.
- Location: 1. Matta, Swat; 2. Dera Ismail Khan; 3. Islamabad; 4. Hub; 5. Hangu; 6. Kohat
- Attack type: Suicide bombings
- Deaths: 154+
- Injuries: 231+

In July 2007, a series of suicide bombings took place across Pakistan in the aftermath of the Lal Masjid siege which resulted in an end to the 10-month truce following the Waziristan Accord.

== Bombings ==
=== 14 July ===
On 14 July 2007, 24 Pakistan Army soldiers were killed in a suicide attack in North Waziristan tribal agency.

=== 15 July ===
On 15 July 2007, two separate armed attacks occurred in Matta, Swat and Dera Ismail Khan.

The first bombing was a coordinated attack on a military convoy in Matta, a town in Swat District, which killed 16 paramilitary troops and five civilians. According to a security official, the suicide attack involved two cars, one of which hit the convoy from the front causing the most casualties, while the other hit the convoy from the rear. According to witnesses, the twin blasts tore through the roofs of six houses and damaged around thirty nearby shops. An explosives-packed motorcycle was also set off with a remote-controlled device, which had been left in the same vicinity. The security forces immediately cordoned off the area and gunship helicopters started hovering overhead. Several suspects who were thought to be involved were detained by the authorities.

In the second attack, in Dera Ismail Khan, a suicide bomber targeted a police recruitment center, killing at least 28 people and injuring nearly 60 others who were taking their police entrance exams. Twelve policemen and sixteen candidates were among the dead. The suicide bomber blew himself up at the recruiting center’s main reception area. According to the witness accounts, the center was filled with 200 job applicants appearing in written examinations and getting medical checkups. Bomb disposal experts defused two live hand grenades recovered from the scene.

=== 17 July ===
On 17 July 2007, a suicide bomber targeted the venue of the district bar council convention, killing 17 people, including two women and injuring more than 50 others in Islamabad. The suicide bomber blew himself up outside the security barrier where the political workers of Pakistan Peoples Party (PPP) and the Pakistan Muslim League (N) were waiting for the arrival of the then-Chief Justice Iftikhar Muhammad Chaudhry.

The attack occurred a few feet away from the PPP’s camp, minutes before the chief justice’s scheduled arrival at the venue near the district courts, adjacent to the headquarters of Islamabad Police. The sound of the blast was heard almost 5 kilometers away at the Zero Point Interchange. About 10 minutes after the incident, the first ambulance arrived at the scene. Around six to eight kilograms of explosive material was used in the attack.

=== 19 July ===
On 19 July 2007, a suicide car bomber, apparently targeting a convoy of Chinese mining technicians and engineers, killed at least 29 people, including seven policemen, and injured 30 others in Hub, Balochistan. The bomber rammed into a police van that was escorting the Chinese. The Chinese remained unhurt in the attack.

In another incident, a suicide car bombing at the gates of a police training academy killed at least 7 people, including a policeman, and injured more than 20 others in Hangu. The car bomber timed his attack to coincide with the arrival of a group of young recruits.

In the third attack, a suspected suicide attack in a mosque used by military personnel killed at least 15 people, including two children in Kohat. The explosion occurred as people were about to offer Isha prayer.

=== 27 July ===
On 27 July 2007, at about 17:15 PST, a suicide bomber targeting police killed at least 13 people, including seven policemen and injured 71 others at an open-air restaurant in Aabpara Market in Islamabad. According to the Interior Ministry spokesman, the government had received intelligence information about a probable suicide bombing in Aabpara. The blast occurred amid protests by religious students, at the reopening of Lal Masjid to the public, two weeks after the commando raid. After the bombing, police retook control of the mosque and arrested about 50 protesters that resisted.
