= Jamia Hafsa =

Islamic university in Pakistan

Jamia Syeda Hafsa
- جامعہ سیدہ حفصہ
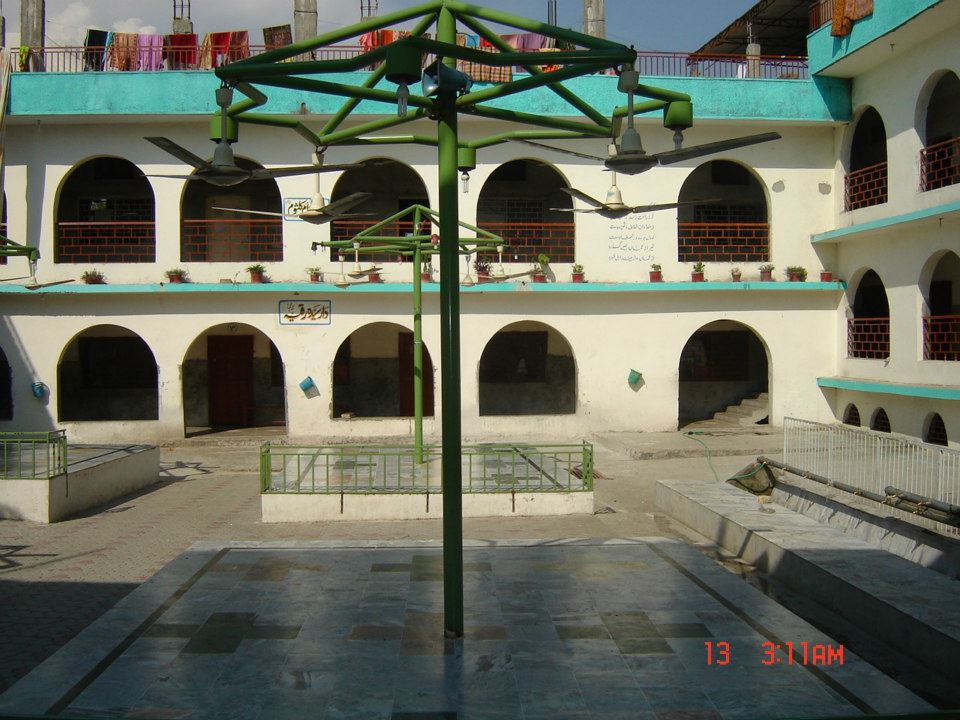
- Courtyard of Jamia Hafsa
- Type: Private Islamic University
- Established: 1989; 37 years ago
- Founder: Mawlānā Abdullah Ghazi
- Parent institution: Jamia Faridia
- Religious affiliation: Sunni Deobandi Islam
- Chancellor: Mawlānā Abdul Aziz
- Principal: Umme Hassan
- Location: Islamabad, Islamabad Capital Territory, Pakistan; 33°42′46.3″N 73°05′13.1″E
- Campus: Urban
- Colours: Blue, White
- Location within Islamabad Capital Territory

Jamia Syeda Hafsa (Urdu: جامعہ سیدہ حفصہ), commonly known as Jamia Hafsa (Urdu: جامعہ حفصہ, romanized: Jamiya Hafsah), is a Deobandi Islamic university adjacent to the Lal Masjid in Islamabad, the capital of Pakistan. The madrassah was established in 1989 by Maulana Abdullah Ghazi, who remained the Chancellor until he was assassinated by unknown gunmen in October 1998.

The seminary is considered as the largest women's madrasa in Pakistan.

The seminary is headed by Mawlānā Abdul Aziz and Umme Hassan.

== History ==
Jamia Hafsa was founded in 1989 by Mawlānā Abdullah Ghazi, as the women's branch of Jamia Uloom Al-Islamia Al-Faridia. located adjacent to the Lal Masjid (Red Mosque), the institution was built on 7,500 square yards of land.

== 2007 Siege ==
The building became the site of a military operation in 2007 and was severely damaged during the siege and was subsequently demolished.

== Reconstruction ==
In 2011, the seminary administration was allocated a new additional plot in Sector H-8, Islamabad, adjacent to Allama Iqbal Open University.

In 2019, the seminary was returned to its original location after a ruling by the Supreme Court of Pakistan.

== Gallery ==
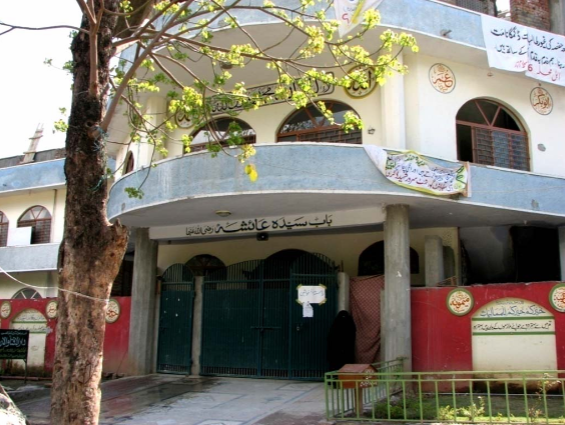
The front façade of Jamia Hafsa

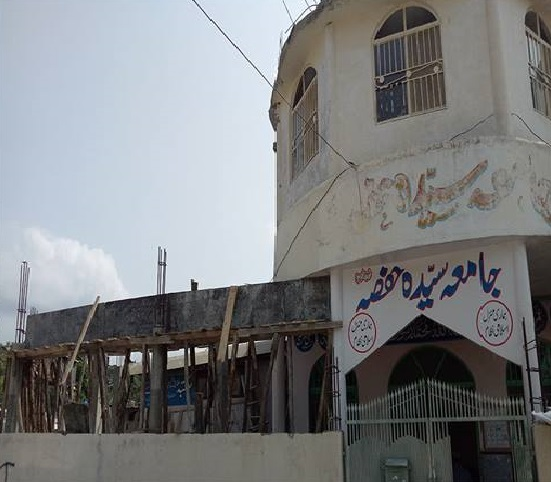
The seminary during its reconstruction, 2016

== See also ==
- Jamia Faridia
- Lal Masjid
