= Waziristan Accord =

Agreement between Pakistani and Taliban

- Part of the War in North-West Pakistan
- Date: 5 September 2006–10 July 2007
- Location: Pakistan (Waziristan)
- Participants: Pakistan; Taliban
- Outcome: Breakdown of the peace agreement in the aftermath of the Siege of Lal Masjid

The Waziristan Accord (Urdu: وزیرستان معاہدہ) was a ceasefire agreement between the Government of Pakistan and local Taliban militants in North Waziristan.

Signed on 5 September 2006 in the North Waziristan town of Miranshah, the accord aimed to end hostilities in the Federally Administered Tribal Areas and end the conflict which began with the Battle of Wana in 2004, after which the Pakistani military engaged in sustained operations against local rebels affiliated with the Taliban and Al-Qaeda.

The truce established a 14-month period of peace in the region. It collapsed on July 10, 2007, following the Pakistani military's siege of Lal Masjid in Islamabad and the death of Abdul Rashid Ghazi. The event caused a severe breakdown in relations and triggered a wave of retaliatory violence known as the July bombings. In response, various tribal and militant factions declared an war against the Pakistani state, marking the beginning of the War in North-West Pakistan.

== Details of the accord ==
The accord consists of 16 clauses and 4 sub-clauses. The major points include:

- The Government agrees to stop air and ground attacks against militants in Waziristan.
- Militants are to cease cross-border movement into and out of Afghanistan.
- Foreigners (understood to mean foreign jihadists) in North Waziristan will have to leave Pakistan but "those who cannot leave will be allowed to live peacefully, respecting the law of the land and the agreement".
- Area check-points and border patrols will be staffed and operated by a tribal force. Pakistan Army forces will withdraw from control points.
- No parallel administration will be established in the area. The law of the Government shall remain in force.
- The Government agrees to follow local customs and traditions in resolving issues.
- Tribal leaders will ensure that no one attacks law enforcement personnel or damages state property.
- Tribesmen will not carry heavy weapons. Small arms are allowed.
- Militants will not enter agencies adjacent to this agency (the agency of North Waziristan).
- Both sides will return any captured weapons, vehicles, and communication devices.
- The Government will release captured militants and will not arrest them again.
- The Government will pay compensation for property damage and deaths of innocent civilians in the area.

== Reactions ==
=== Pakistan ===
President Pervez Musharraf said," This treaty is not to deal with the Taliban. It is actually to fight the Taliban."

Chairman Joint Chiefs of Staff Committee, Gen. Ehsan ul Haq testified the failure to end the violence and expulsion of Central Asian and Afghan Arabs in the country noting that, "the al-Qaeda and the Taliban militants used the peace agreement to regroup and carry out terrorist attacks in both Pakistan and Afghanistan.

Imran Khan stated "Waziristan has been a disaster; there's been a disgraceful withdrawal from there. The Pakistan Army has been defeated"

Some Islamabad-based observers view the truce accord as a prelude to hot pursuit chases of mujahideen into Pakistan by NATO forces operating in Afghanistan.

=== International ===
Afghan Foreign Minister Rangeen Dadfar Spanta said the peace accord in North Waziristan is insufficient. He commented to the BBC:

I believe this is a cardinal mistake to believe that Waziristan is the only centre of terrorist activity. I think it is [in] a lot of other places in our region and a lot of organisations and also madrassas [religious schools], that they are the centre of terrorist activity.

White House spokesman Tony Snow, commenting on 7 September 2006, said that Islamabad had given the US assurances that the ceasefire accord would not undermine the hunt for Osama bin Laden and the agreement was aimed at combating extremism.

Abdullah Farhad, a local Taliban spokesman, said there were no foreign fighters in the area, and if there were, the Government should have provided evidence of their existence.

The deal was severely criticized in the western press with one editorial describing it as "the terms of surrender by Pakistan to the Taliban and al Qaeda". they also termed it as an "unconditional surrender of Waziristan" by Pakistan, adding that the deal is "a boon to the terrorists and a humiliation for the Pakistani government."
