= Basti Abdullah railway station =

Railway station in Punjab, Pakistan

Basti Abdullah Railway Station بستی عبداللہ ریلوے اسٹیشن

General information
- Coordinates: 28.5621°N 69.7562°E
- Owner: Ministry of Railways
- Line: Kotri–Attock Line
- Tracks: 2

Other information
- Station code: BLAH

History
- Opened: 1891
- Rebuilt: 1972
- Former names: Great Indian Peninsula Railway
- Original company: British Colonial Government (1891-1947)
Location
- Location within Punjab, Pakistan Location within Pakistan

Basti Abdullah Railway Station (Urdu: بستی عبد الله ریلوے اسٹیشن) was located near the village of Basti-Abdullah, Rajanpur district, in the province of Punjab, Pakistan.

The station and the nearby village are both named after Mawlānā Abdullah Ghazi.

== History ==
The railway station was first established during the British Raj as part of the Great Indian Peninsula Railway, however it was later incorporated into Main Line 2 (Kotri–Attock Line), and heavy remodeling of the station was completed around 1972 by The Ministry of Railways.

The stations served the village Basti-Abdullah and the nearby city of Kashmore (which also has its own separate station).

== See also ==
- List of railway stations in Pakistan
- Pakistan Railways
