= International Center for Religion & Diplomacy =

American non-profit organization

The International Center for Religion and Diplomacy (ICRD) is a Washington, D.C.–based non-profit organization dedicated to resolving identity-based conflicts that exceed the reach of traditional diplomacy by incorporating religion as part of the solution. Acting as a bridge between religion and politics, ICRD's mission statement is: "ICRD's mission is to Bridge Religious Considerations with Global Peacebuilding Policy and Practice."

ICRD was established in 2000 by Dr. Douglas Johnston, a Naval officer and a man of deep Christian faith. The organization focuses on addressing the root causes of identity-based conflict and violent extremism. ICRD's guiding principles are drawn from Dr. Johnston's influential works on navigating religion and diplomacy, including Religion, the Missing Dimension of Statecraft, Faith-based Diplomacy: Trumping Realpolitik, and Religion, Terror, and Error: U.S. Foreign Policy and the Challenge of Spiritual Engagement. These publications explore the positive role that religious or spiritual factors can play in preventing or resolving conflicts while promoting social change based on justice and reconciliation. In 2008, Dr. Johnston was recognized as "The Father of Faith-based Diplomacy" by Christianity Today, a leading Christian journal.

== Programs and diplomatic work ==
Since its establishment in 1998, the International Center for Religion and Diplomacy (ICRD) has conducted over 90 distinct programs and diplomatic efforts. Notable examples include:

- Release of Korean Hostages (2007): ICRD secured the release of 21 Korean missionaries held hostage by the Taliban in Afghanistan.
- Islamic Education in Uganda (2020–2023): ICRD collaborated with Islamic education stakeholders in Uganda to conduct a study of national Madrasa education. The organization implemented follow-up programs aimed at enhancing pedagogy and curriculum, focusing on social cohesion, tolerance, critical thinking, and student leadership.
- Sudan Civil War Mediation (1999–2005): ICRD played a role in ending the 21-year civil war in Sudan between the Islamic North and the Christian/animist South. This was achieved by establishing an Inter-religious Council of Muslim and Christian religious leaders to address the religious dimensions of the conflict.
- Rehabilitation in Maldives (2021–2023): ICRD supported the government of Maldives in establishing a National Reintegration Center for rehabilitating and reintegrating returned foreign terrorist fighter families through a trauma-informed, whole-of-society approach.
- Kashmir Conflict Resolution (2000–2006): ICRD helped diffuse tensions in the Kashmir region, fostering cooperation across religious divides. This effort facilitated the return of displaced Hindus (Pandits) to the Kashmir Valley, from which they had been evicted by Muslim militants 13 years earlier.
- United States Polarization Workshops (2021–2024): ICRD conducted assessments and workshops with faith leaders in divided U.S. communities, developing ministerial tools to address toxic polarization, rehumanize perceived adversaries, and promote dialogue across differences.
- Back-Channel Communications with Iran (2005–2016): ICRD opened and maintained a back-channel communication line to promote improved relations with Iran, which remained active for more than a decade.
- Educational Reform in Saudi Arabia (2011–2017): ICRD facilitated educational reforms in Saudi Arabia, removing radical Wahhabi content from public school textbooks and teacher training materials. The organization also trained Saudi educators on the elements of global citizenship.
- Madrasa Reform in Pakistan (2004–2012): ICRD reformed madrasas in Pakistan, including those associated with the Taliban, to develop critical thinking skills among students and expand curricula to include physical and social sciences, emphasizing religious tolerance and human rights, especially women's rights.
- Women of Faith Reconciliation in Colombia (2013–2017): ICRD facilitated reconciliation trainings and community workshops for women of faith in Colombia to support the sustainable reintegration of former combatants across eight conflict-impacted regions.
