= End of the Past =

End of the Past is a book by Pakistani journalist, cultural critic and satirist Nadeem F. Paracha. Published by Vanguard Publications in 2016, it is a social history of Pakistan in which Paracha charts the religious and cultural evolution of Pakistan through the country's cultural, sporting and ideological histories.

Paracha looks at Pakistan's political, sporting and cultural pasts, hoping that future generations will learn from them and chart a brand new beginning for a country that he loves passionately. He pleads for a decisive end of the past so that a new and less tumultuous future can be envisioned and built.
