= Declan Walsh (journalist) =

Irish writer and journalist

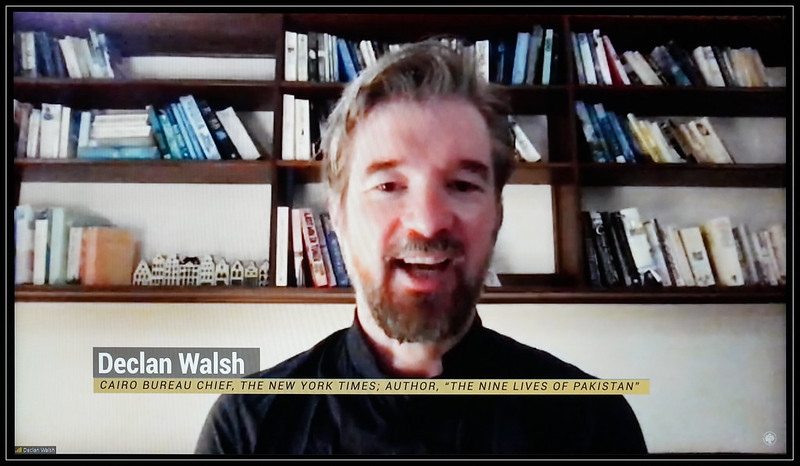
- Walsh in a 2020 discussion hosted by the U.S. Institute of Peace
- Born: 1973 or 1974 (age 52–53); Ballina, Mayo, Ireland
- Education: University College Dublin (BComm); Dublin City University (MA)
- Occupation: Journalist

Declan Walsh (born 1973 or 1974) is a Pulitzer Prize winning Irish author and journalist who is the chief Africa correspondent for The New York Times. Walsh was expelled from Pakistan in May 2013 but continued covering the country from London. He described the experience in his 2020 book The Nine Lives of Pakistan: Dispatches from a Precarious State.

Walsh's reporting on the Sudanese civil war earned him and the Times' staff the 2025 Pulitzer Prize for International Reporting.

== Early life and career ==
Walsh was born in Ballina, County Mayo, where he attended St Muredach's College. He was educated in Dublin, receiving a Bachelor of Commerce from University College Dublin and a Master of Arts in journalism from Dublin City University.

He started his career at The Sunday Business Post in 1998. A year later, he won an Irish national media award for Social and Campaigning Journalism and moved to Kenya to work as a freelance journalist. Based in Nairobi, Walsh travelled widely across sub-Saharan Africa to report for The Independent of London and The Irish Times. In 2004 he joined The Guardian as the paper's correspondent for Afghanistan and Pakistan and moved to Islamabad, Pakistan. In January 2012 he moved to The New York Times as its Pakistan bureau chief. Following his expulsion from Pakistan, Walsh became the Times' Cairo bureau chief, then returned to Nairobi as the paper's chief Africa correspondent.

== Expulsion from Pakistan ==
Walsh was expelled from Pakistan in May 2013—an experience he wrote about in his 2020 book The Nine Lives of Pakistan: Dispatches from a Precarious State—but continued covering the country from London.

On 9 May 2013, Walsh learned by letter that the Pakistan Ministry of Interior, citing "undesirable activities", cancelled his visas that had been valid until January 2014 and he had 72 hours to leave the country. On 11 May 2013, while he was in public reporting on Pakistan's general election and voting behaviour in Lahore, state security officials detained him in a hotel and escorted him to the airport the following morning.

The New York Times and other international media organisations protested his expulsion, which was seen as counter to Pakistan's current policy on democracy and freedom of the press. Pakistani news media later reported that Walsh had been placed on Pakistan's official "blacklist" and had been declared "persona non grata".

In March 2014 Prime Minister Nawaz Sharif assured a visiting delegation from the Committee to Protect Journalists that an "immediate review" of incident would be conducted. The Sharif statement was an encouragement to the editor of the New York Times, Jill Abramson.

Walsh's case was outlined in detail in "A Bullet has been chosen for you: Attacks on journalists in Pakistan", a report by Amnesty International on declining media freedom in Pakistan, which was published in April 2014.

== Escaping arrest in Egypt ==
In 2017, Walsh barely escaped being arrested in Egypt. New York Times publisher Arthur Sulzberger announced this event in a 23 September 2019 presentation at Brown University, which was also published as an OpEd in the paper:

"Two years ago, we got a call from a United States government official warning us of the imminent arrest of a New York Times reporter based in Egypt named Declan Walsh. Though the news was alarming, the call was actually fairly standard. Over the years, we’ve received countless such warnings from American diplomats, military leaders and national security officials.
"But this particular call took a surprising and distressing turn. We learned the official was passing along this warning without the knowledge or permission of the Trump administration. Rather than trying to stop the Egyptian government or assist the reporter, the official believed, the Trump administration intended to sit on the information and let the arrest be carried out. The official feared being punished for even alerting us to the danger.
"Unable to count on our own government to prevent the arrest or help free Declan if he were imprisoned, we turned to his native country, Ireland, for help. Within an hour, Irish diplomats traveled to his house and safely escorted him to the airport before Egyptian forces could detain him.
"We hate to imagine what would have happened had that brave official not risked their career to alert us to the threat."

== Investigation of UAE in Chad ==
In 2023, Walsh revealed that the United Arab Emirates was engaging in covert operations in Amdjarass, Chad, to assist the Rapid Support Forces in the 2023 war in Sudan. The investigation earned him the 2025 Pulitzer Prize in International Reporting.

== Books ==
In 2020, Walsh published The Nine Lives of Pakistan: Dispatches from a Precarious State— The book was listed as one of The Telegraph's Books of the Year and received praise in the New York Times, The Wall Street Journal, and The Irish Times. In 2021, Walsh received the Overseas Press Club of America Cornelius Ryan Award for best nonfiction book on international affairs.

== Awards ==
- The Pulitzer Prize for International Reporting
- George Polk Award for War Reporting
- James Foley Medill Medal for Courage in Journalism
- Edward Weintal Prize for Distinguished Reporting on Foreign Policy and Diplomacy
- The Prix-Bayeaux Jean Marin Prize
- The Overseas Press Club of America Cornelius Ryan Award
- Robert F. Kennedy Journalism Award
