= Nadeem F. Paracha =

Pakistani journalist and cultural critic

Nadeem Farooq Paracha
- Born: Nadeem Farooq Paracha; 6 February 1967 (age 59); Karachi
- Other name: Nadeem F. Paracha
- Occupation: Journalist
- Years active: 1987– present

Nadeem Farooq Paracha (Urdu: ندیم فاروق پراچہ; born 6 February 1967), also known as NFP, is a Pakistani journalist, author, cultural critic, satirist, and historian.

He is a columnist for Pakistan's largest English-language daily Dawn.

== Career ==
He is the author of ten books on the social and political history of Pakistan. These include The Pakistan Anti-Hero, End of the Past, and Points of Entry. His sixth book The Reluctant Republic was published in November 2021.

On 11 August 2022, Paracha's seventh book For Faith, State and the Soul was launched. The book is a history of popular culture in Pakistan. It is considered to be Paracha's most ambitious work. In April 2023, Imran Khan: Myth of the Pakistani Middle-Class was published. It is one of the first books to explore the political career of Imran Khan. In the book, Paracha details the rise and slide of Khan's politics.

In 2024's Of Reason, Romance and Ruin Paracha traces the political and intellectual origins of the Pakistan Ideology and how instead of unifying an ethnically diverse polity, it has created ethnic and sectarian fissures and promoted Islamism. Paracha also explained the ideology as a postmodernist project.

In 2025, a study by Paracha on the rise of populism, especially in the United States, Brazil and Pakistan was published as his tenth book, We The Mob.

In October 2026, his eleventh book in as many years was published. The book Passion of Paradox details the history and study of youth politics in Pakistan. The American Professor of Political Science Devin T. Hagerty described it as one of Paracha’s strongest works and praised him for being the foremost chronicler of Pakistan’s political, social and cultural life.

Paracha is also a Research Scholar and Reagan-Fascell Fellow at the International Forum for Democratic Studies in Washington DC, and a consultant for Adcom Leo Burnett Worldwide.

Paracha graduated from the Karachi Grammar School in 1983.

He then enrolled in a state-owned college in Karachi where he was active as a Marxist student leader. After college, he joined journalism. Over the last decade, he has often described himself as a Muslim modernist, a progressive Pakistani nationalist, and a democrat. He is also a harsh critic of postmodernism and is staunchly against the mixing of religion with politics.

== Works ==
Academic articles

- "Student Politics in Pakistan: A Celebration, Lament & History"

Books

- End of the past : An immediate eyewitness history of a troubled nation, Lahore : Vanguard Books, 2016, 234 p.
- The Pakistan Anti-Hero : History of Pakistani nationalism through the lives of iconoclasts, Lahore : Vanguard Books, 2017, 396 p.
- Points of Entry : Encounters at the origin-sites of Pakistan, Chennai : Tranquebar, 2018, 160 p.
- Muslim modernism : A case for Naya Pakistan, Lahore : Vanguard Books, 2019, 162 p.
- Soul Rivals : State, Militant and Pop Sufism in Pakistan, Chennai : Tranquebar, 2020, 128 p.
- The Reluctant Republic: Ethos And Mythos Of Pakistan, Lahore: Vanguard Books, 2021, 147 p.
- For Faith, State and the Soul: A History of Popular Culture in Pakistan, Karachi: Markings, 2022, 204 p.
- Imran Khan: Myth of the Pakistani Middle-Class, Lahore: Vanguard Books, 2023, 214 p.
- Of Reason, Romance and Ruin: A Conceptual History of the Pakistan Ideology , Lahore: Vanguard Books, 2024, 177 p.
- We The Mob: A Stream-of-Thought Exploration of Three Populist Uprisings , Lahore: Vanguard Books, 2024, 153 p.
- Paradox of Passion: Youth Politics in Pakistan , Lahore: Vanguard Books, 2026, 188 p.
