= Islamic university =

The term "Islamic university" (Arabic: الجامعة الإسلامية, Jami'ah Islamiyah), sometimes called madrasah jāmiʿah (Arabic: مدرسة جامعة), can be used to describe educational institutions that are based on Islamic system of education as well as institutions that focus on teaching Islam as a main curriculum. The word "madrasah" can refer to an Islamic educational institution of any level, while the word jāmiʿah simply means "university."

However, there are various institutions which include "Islamic University" in their name while being not necessarily geared towards the teaching of Islam (much like how a Catholic university generally does not teach Catholicism).

== See also ==
- Islamic seminaries
