= Aabpara =

Pakistani commercial zone

Aabpara آبپارہ
- Commercial area
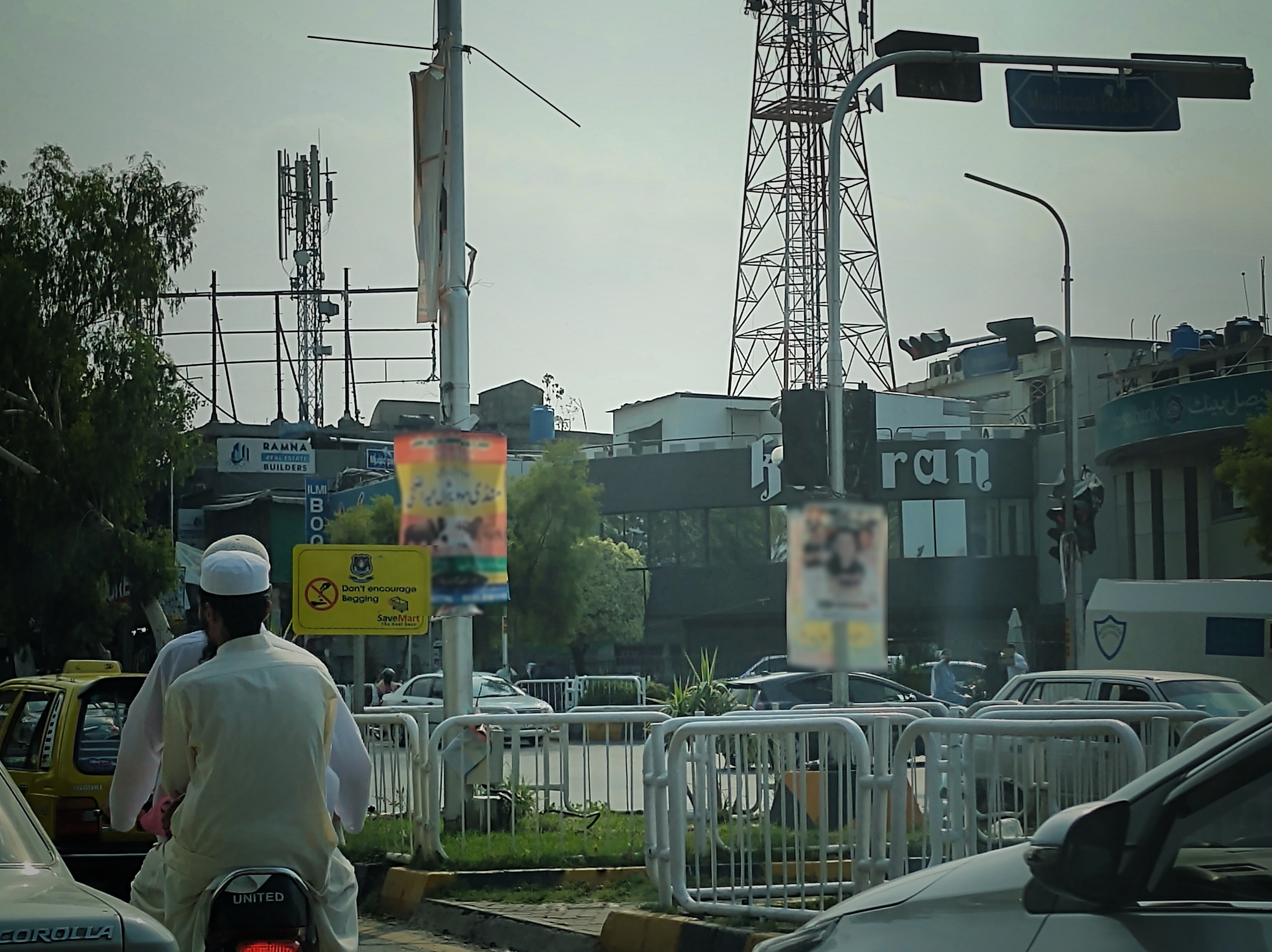
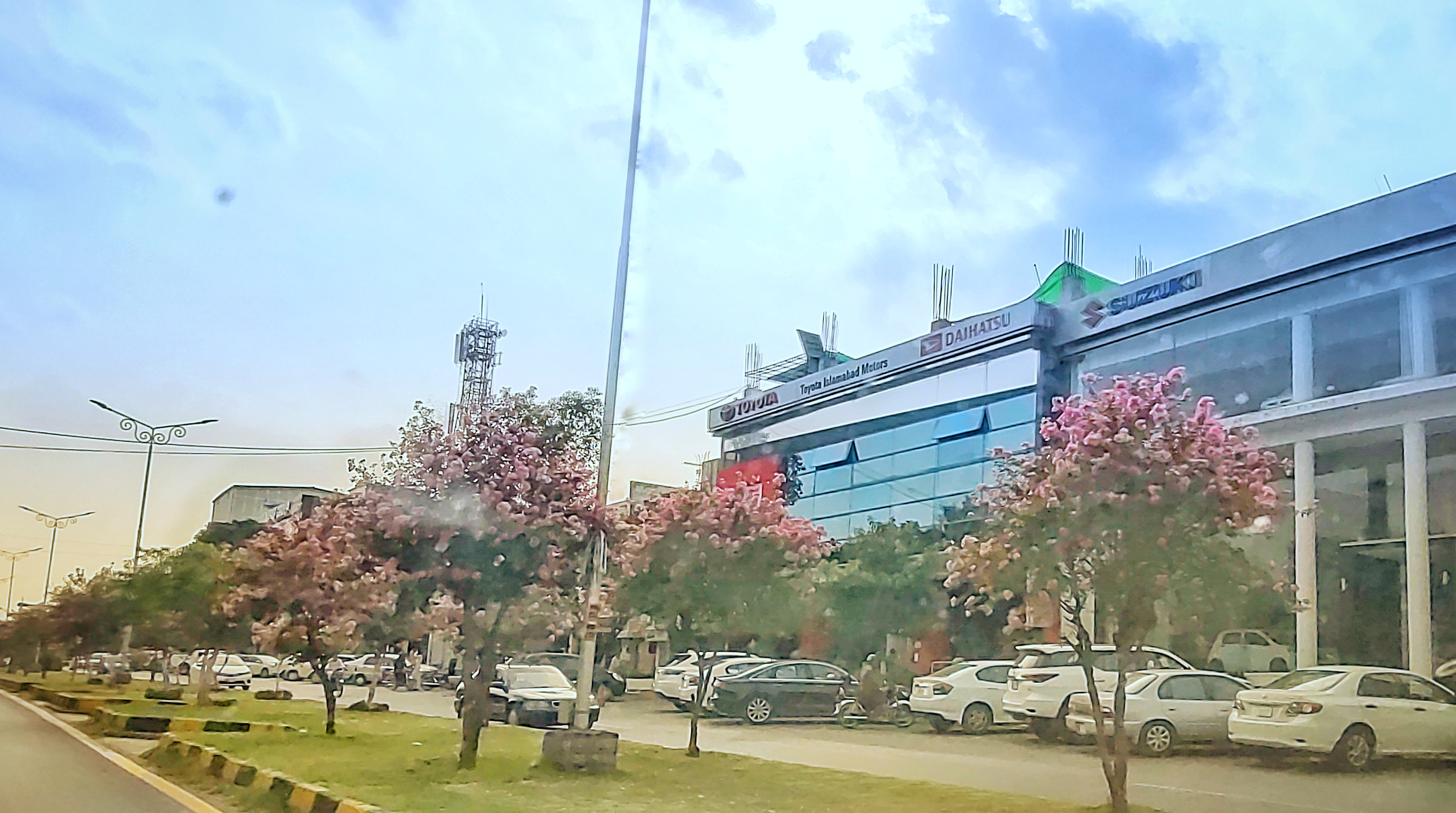
- Country: Pakistan
- Territory: Islamabad Capital Territory
- Sector: G-6

Aabpara (Urdu: آبپارہ ), historically known as Bagh Bhattan (Urdu: باغ بھٹان), is a commercial area near the Lal Masjid in Sector G-6 of Islamabad, Pakistan. Established in 1960, it is the oldest market in the capital city. Aabpara is also notable for housing the headquarters of Pakistan's intelligence agencies, the Inter-Services Intelligence (ISI) and the Intelligence Bureau (IB).

== Etymology ==
Initially developed as a residential area for civil servants in the newly established capital, the locality is named after a girl born in 1960. She was the first child born in the area, and the name was chosen by the residents to commemorate the event. The child's family was part of the Bengali community that had migrated from East Pakistan (now Bangladesh).
