= Lal Masjid, Islamabad =

Mosque in Islamabad, Pakistan

Lal Masjid
- لال مسجد

Religion
- Affiliation: Sunni Islam
- Sect: Deobandi
- Ecclesiastical or organisational status: Congregational mosque
- Leadership: Mawlānā Abdul Aziz (Imam and Khatib)
- Status: Active

Location
- Location: Red Zone, Islamabad, Capital Territory
- Country: Pakistan
- Interactive map of Lal Masjid
- Coordinates: 33°42′46.3″N 73°05′13.1″E

Architecture
- Architects: Zahir ud Deen Khwaja (1965); Nayyar Ali Dada (2010)
- Type: Mosque architecture
- Style: Modern Islamic; (Ottoman and; Mughal)
- Groundbreaking: 1964
- Completed: 1966 (original); 2010 (renovations)

Specifications
- Capacity: 15,000 worshippers
- Dome: One
- Minaret: Two
- Materials: Red sandstone; marble

The Lal Masjid (Urdu: لال مسجد, lit. 'Red Mosque'), officially the Markazi Jāmi Masjid Islamabad (Urdu: مرکزی جامع مسجد اسلام آباد, lit. 'Central Mosque Islamabad') is a Congregational mosque located in Islamabad, the capital of Pakistan. The mosque was constructed in 1966 and is one of the oldest mosques in the city. It was also the largest mosque in the city for twenty years, until the Faisal Mosque was built in 1986.

Located in a very central position, it lies in close proximity to the two busy commercial centres - the Aabpara Market in the east and the Melody Market in the north and is a short distance away from the Presidential Palace and Prime Minister's Office.

The mosque later came to be known as the site of a siege which led to a military operation by the Pakistan Army against the leaders and students of the mosque, resulting in hundreds of deaths.

As of 2021, Mawlānā Abdul Aziz remains the Imam and khateeb (sermon giver) of the mosque.

== History ==
When Pakistan’s capital was shifted from Karachi to Islamabad, a central grand mosque was envisioned as a gathering place for the new city's residents, hence in October 1964, President Ayub Khan laid the foundation stone for the mosque.

According to Capital Development Authority (CDA) records the project was completed in May 1966.

Upon completion the mosque was named "Markazi Jāmi Masjid Islamabad"(Urdu: مرکزی جامع مسجد اسلام آباد), and it was not initially painted red, however after the small yellow bricks used in its construction, turned out to be defective and started to rot, which the contractor found a solution to by applying cement and painting it red, and since its exterior and interior were now painted red, it became popularly known to the locals as "Lal Masjid".

President Ayub Khan requested to Muhammad Yusuf Banuri of Jamia Uloom-ul-Islamia, to suggest a preacher for the mosque and upon his recommendation, Mawlānā Abdullah Ghazi was appointed the first Imam and Khatib of mosque in 1966.

The mosque was major tourist attraction frequently visited by foreign tourists and delegates during their visits to the new capital and was commonly featured on postcards.

The mosque was also visited by prominent figures such as Prime Minister Balakh Sher Mazari and Presidents of Pakistan including Ghulam Ishaq Khan and Farooq Leghari. as well as foreign leaders such as King Faisal, King Khalid and President Ziaur Rahman. After retirement, President Ayub Khan was also a frequent visitor to the mosque, as he lived in a villa nearby.

The mosque gained significant prominence during President Zia-ul-Haq's government, undergoing extensive renovations and expansions under his orders. Zia frequently prayed at the mosque and especially attended Friday prayers there every week.

In 1976, as part of his six-day state visit to Pakistan, King Khalid of Saudi Arabia also visited the mosque, and it was during this visit he initiated the construction of King Faisal Mosque in Islamabad.

== Architecture ==
1971 postcard photograph of the mosque, published by Packages Limited.

Designed by Pakistani architect Zaheer ud Deen Khawaja, the mosque blends Ottoman and Mughal architectural styles. The mosque’s exterior design takes inspiration from Jama Mosque and Badshahi Mosque, while its minarets and courtyard draw inspiration from Istanbul’s Süleymaniye Mosque.

A reflecting pool built for ablution was originally part of the courtyard but was removed during restoration work in 2010.

== Political History ==
In 1974, the mosque emerged as a central hub for gatherings and processions organized by the Tehreek-e-Tahafuz-e-Khatm-e-Nubuwwat. The movement’s leaders, Mufti Mahmood and Allama Yusuf Banuri, both former teachers of Imam Maulana Abdullah, this movement ultimately contributed to the Second Amendment to the Constitution of Pakistan.

By 1977, the mosque had become a key rallying point for the Nizam-e-Mustafa movement, a populist Islamist uprising that sought to overthrow Zulfikar Ali Bhutto’s secular-socialist government and replace it with an Islamic system of governance.

During the 1980s, the mosque also served as a recruitment center for mujahideen, many of whom went on to participate in the Soviet-Afghan War (1979–1989) and the Kashmir conflict.

The mosque's Imam Maulana Abdullah was assassinated in 1998, his two sons Abdul Aziz and Abdul Rashid took over the mosque.

== 2007 Siege and Assault ==
In 2007, Students of Mosque and its affiliated Jamia Hafsa burned down film shops in Aabpara and occupied a Children's Library adjacent to the mosque and announced the implementation of Sharia law in Islamabad. They demanded government also implement Sharia law and threats of armed jihad were made in case of refusal.

On 3 July 2007, the stand-off between the students and the government resulted in bloody gun battles in which over twenty people, including students of the mosque, members of the media, paramilitary personnel, and a businessman were reportedly killed, and over one hundred others were injured.

On 4 July 2007 at 8:05 p.m., The mosque's Imam and leader Abdul Aziz was arrested while leaving the complex disguised in a burqa.

=== Mosque stormed ===
On the morning of 10 July 2007, Pakistan Army Special Forces stormed the mosque and began by attacking and breaching the mosque from the south and assaulted it from three directions taking control of most of the complex at 11:00 am (23:00 GMT).

The government claimed that one hundred people, including mosque's administrator Abdul Rashid Ghazi, were killed in the operation, while the mosque administration kept claiming that around two hundred were killed.

== 2008 Bombing ==
On 6 July 2008, at 7:50 PM local time, a bomb exploded near Lal Masjid, killing 18 policemen and 1 civilian. A Pakistani official claimed the bombing occurred on the first anniversary of the siege and was a revenge attack. The attack occurred even amidst tight security in Islamabad, when thousands of students came to mark the day when Pakistani troops stormed Lal Masjid.

Advisor to the Prime Minister on Interior Rehman Malik, who visited the blast site, said about 12,000 students attended the rally and the attack was directed at the police.

== Restorations and Reopening ==
The mosque especially its exterior walls, minarets, and courtyards, had sustained bullet holes and structural damage during the siege. The government tasked the Capital Development Authority (CDA) with repairing and rehabilitating mosque shortly after the operation and it was repaired and opened to public three weeks after the siege.

The CDA also changed its color scheme, painting it beige and white, and reduced the height of its fortified boundary walls. In 2009, Malik Riaz's Bahria Town carried out extensive renovations and restoration of the mosque, during which the exterior walls were embellished with sandstone, mosaics, and intricate calligraphy, while the interior of the main hall was enhanced with detailed wood paneling and signboards around the mosque were updated to display its original name, "Markazi Jāmi Masjid Islamabad", replacing the previous designation as the Red Mosque. The renovation project was completed in 2010 and were overseen by architect Nayyar Ali Dada.

== COVID-19 Controversy ==
In 2020, during the COVID-19 pandemic, while nationwide lockdown measures were in effect, the mosque remained open, attracting hundreds of worshippers who gathered for prayers.

The mosque’s imam, Mawlānā Abdul Aziz, publicly refused to comply with lockdown orders, stating, “Lockdowns are not the answer to these problems. We should have faith in God at this time and place their hope in Him. If death is written for you, then it will come.”

== Gallery ==
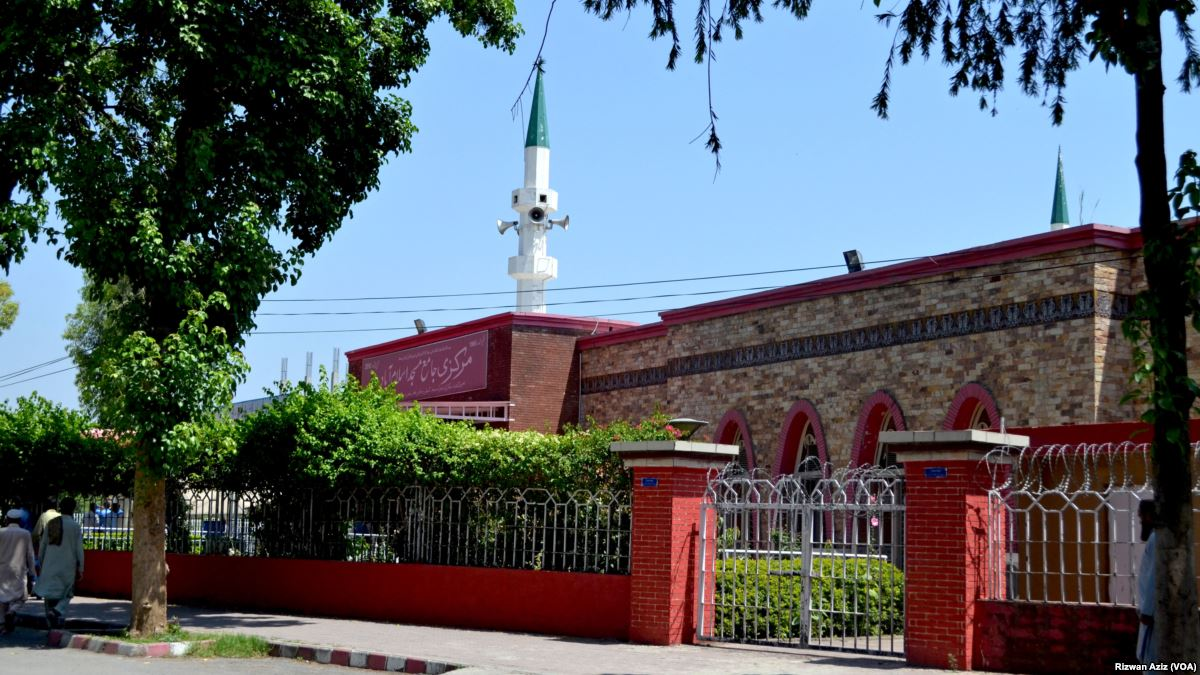
Exterior view of the Mosque

== See also ==
- Islam in Pakistan
- List of mosques in Pakistan
