= List of people banned from entering China =

This is a list of notable people who have been, or are currently, banned from entering China by the governing Chinese Communist Party.

== Currently banned ==
Individual	Nationality	Occupation	Reason banned
David Alton	United Kingdom	Politician	Spreading "lies and disinformation" about the country, according to the Chinese government.
Steve Bannon	United States	Former White House chief strategist under the first presidency of Donald Trump (2017)	"Planned, promoted and executed a series of crazy moves, gravely interfered in China's internal affairs, undermined China's interests, offended the Chinese people, and seriously disrupted China-U.S. relations."
Margarete Bause	Germany	Politician	Vocal supporter of the Muslim Uighur minorities and asking the German government to support sending UN observers to Xinjiang province.
Björk	Iceland	Singer	Shouted "Tibet, Tibet" at the end of a performance of "Declare Independence".
John Bolton	United States	Former US ambassador to the United Nations (2005–2006) and United States National Security Advisor (2018–2019)	"Planned, promoted and executed a series of crazy moves, gravely interfered in China's internal affairs, undermined China's interests, offended the Chinese people, and seriously disrupted China-U.S. relations."
Jon Bon Jovi	United States	Singer	Used an image of the Dalai Lama during a concert.
James W. Carr	United States	Former commissioner of the United States Commission on International Religious Freedom	Retaliation for U.S. sanctioning officials over human rights abuses against Uyghurs and other minorities in Xinjiang.
Cheng Ying-yao	Taiwan	Minister of Education (since 2024)	Supporter of Taiwan's independence.
Ker Chien-ming	Taiwan	Majority Leader of the Legislative Yuan	Supporter of Taiwan's independence.
Ted Cruz	United States	United States senator from Texas (since 2013)	Critical of the Chinese Communist Party's policies toward minority groups and people of faith.
Miley Cyrus	United States	Singer and actress	Took a picture where she pulled her skin back around her eyes, which was construed as racist against Asians.
Harrison Ford	United States	Actor	Outspoken support for Tibet.
Noel Gallagher	United Kingdom	Singer	Performed in a two-day Tibetan Freedom Concert in New York in 1997; deemed as an "enemy of the people".
Ursula Gauthier	France	Journalist	Published an article about Uyghurs in Xinjiang which Chinese government officials disapproved of.
Richard Gere	United States	Actor	Outspoken support for Tibet and criticism of the Chinese Communist Party.
Nus Ghani	United Kingdom	Politician	Spreading "lies and disinformation" about the country, according to the Chinese government.
Selena Gomez	United States	Singer	Shared a photo of her and the Dalai Lama together on social media.
Gigi Hadid	United States	Model	Visa revoked after an online video showed her doing a slant-eyes gesture in imitation of Buddha.
Clive Hamilton	Australia	Public intellectual	Retaliation for Australia banning visas of two Chinese academics.
Jay-Z	United States	Rapper	Constant use of vulgar language in music, according to the former Chinese Culture Ministry.
Alex Joske	Australia	Author	Retaliation for Australia banning visas of two Chinese academics.
Lady Gaga	United States	Singer	Music being too vulgar and meeting with the Dalai Lama.
Anastasia Lin	Canada	Model and human rights activist	Outspoken on human rights abuses in China, particularly against the Chinese Communist Party.
Perry Link	United States	Scholar & professor at the University of California, Riverside	Outspoken on human rights abuses by the Chinese Communist Party and having written essays on the Tiananman Square protests.
Liu Shyh-fang	Taiwan	Minister of the Interior (since 2024)	Supporter of Taiwan's independence.
Tim Loughton	United Kingdom	Politician and Member of Parliament (1997–2024)	Accusing the Chinese government for committing genocide against Uyghur Muslims.
Nadine Maenza	United States	Former Chairwoman of the United States Commission on International Religious Freedom	Retaliation for U.S. sanctioning officials over human rights abuses against Uyghurs and other minorities in Xinjiang.
Franco Mella	Italy	Roman Catholic priest and Hong Kong activist.	Linked to rising tensions between the Chinese government and the Holy See.
Andrew J. Nathan	United States	Professor	Connection with The Tiananmen Papers
Neil O'Brien	United Kingdom	Politician and Parliamentary Under-Secretary of State for Primary Care and Public Health (2022–2023)	Spreading "lies and disinformation" about the country, according to the Chinese government.
Namewee	Malaysia	Singer (2007–present)	Wee has since been banned in mainland China as a result of the song and music video "Fragile" (Chinese: 玻璃心), a collaboration with Taiwan-based Australian singer Kimberley Chen which went viral in October 2021.
James Paterson	Australia	Senator of Victoria (since 2016)	Critical of Chinese actions towards the Uighurs in Xinjiang province as well as attempting to influence opinion about China within Australia.
Andrew Hastie	Australia	MP (since 2015)	
Maria João Pires	Portugal	Pianist	Performing for the Dalai Lama at an international conference.
Mike Pompeo	United States	Former CIA director (2017–2018) and United States secretary of state (2018–2021)	"Planned, promoted and executed a series of crazy moves, gravely interfered in China's internal affairs, undermined China's interests, offended the Chinese people, and seriously disrupted China-U.S. relations."
Iain Duncan Smith	United Kingdom	Former Leader of the Conservative Party (2001–2003)	Accusing the Chinese government for committing genocide against Uyghur Muslims.
David Thewlis	United Kingdom	Actor	Starred in the movie Seven Years in Tibet.
Francis Tolentino	Philippines	Former Senate majority leader (2024–2025) and Acting Secretary of Labor and Employment	Advancing the Philippines' interests in the South China Sea dispute.
Nury Turkel	United States	Chair of the United States Commission on International Religious Freedom	Retaliation for U.S. sanctioning officials over human rights abuses against Uyghurs and other minorities in Xinjiang.
Miles Yu	United States	Historian	Retaliation for U.S. sanctioning two officials over human rights abuses in Tibet.
Zedd	Germany; Russia	DJ and record producer	Liked a tweet from South Park's official account.
Nigel Ng	Malaysia	Comedian	Nigel Ng was banned in China over the weekend after he made jokes about China and its censorship regime, also having his social media accounts banned on Chinese social media websites Weibo and Bilibili due to the “violation of relevant laws and regulations.”
Gilberto Teodoro	Philippines	Secretary of National Defense	For "erroneous remarks" made by Gilberto Teodoro undermining Chinese sovereignty interest and the China–Philippines relations. Includes his wife Monica Prieto and their child.
Monica Prieto	Philippines	Philippine special envoy to UNICEF	For "erroneous remarks" made by Gilberto Teodoro undermining Chinese sovereignty interest and the China–Philippines relations. Includes his wife Monica Prieto and their child.

== Previously banned ==
Individual	Nationality	Occupation	Reason banned	Ban lifted
Jean-Jacques Annaud	France	Director	Directed the movie Seven Years in Tibet.	2012
Bob Dylan	United States	Singer	Chinese authorities argued that his countercultural long-held status was potentially damaging.	2011 (ban applied in 2010)
Helmut Martin	Germany	Sinologist	Criticism of the Chinese Communist Party.	1999 (deceased)
Melissa Mathison	United States	Screenwriter	Activism for Tibet and writer of the movie Kundun, which portrayed the Chinese Communist Party negatively.	2015 (deceased)
Brad Pitt	United States	Actor	Starred in Seven Years in Tibet.	2014
Martin Scorsese	United States	Director	Directed Kundun, which portrayed the Chinese Communist Party negatively.	2012
Elliot Sperling	United States	Historian	Wrote an essay in support of detained Uyghur professor Ilham Tohti.	2017 (deceased)
Marco Rubio	United States	United States senator from Florida (2011–2025) and United States secretary of state (since 2025)	Critical of the Chinese Communist Party's policies toward minority groups and people of faith.	2026

== See also ==
- Human rights abuses in China
- List of people banned from entering Australia
- List of people banned from entering Canada
- List of people banned from entering Ukraine
- List of people banned from entering the United Kingdom
- List of people banned from entering the United States
