= List of people banned from entering Australia =

This is a list of people who have been, or are currently, banned in Australia.

== Currently banned ==
Name	Country of origin	Occupation	Reason banned
Sneako	United States	Content creator	Antisemitism
Itamar Ben-Gvir	Israel	Politician	Inciting settler violence against Palestinians in the West Bank
Julien Blanc	Switzerland, United States	Pickup artist	Promoting dangerous and abusive behavior towards women
Bonnie Blue	United Kingdom	Pornographic actress	Attempting to recruit "barely legal" 18-year-old men to film OnlyFans content with during Schoolies week
David Icke	United Kingdom	Conspiracy theorist	Holocaust denial
David Irving	United Kingdom	Author and Holocaust denialist	Holocaust denial
Gino Jennings	United States	Religious leader	Homophobic remarks
Floyd Mayweather Jr.	United States	Professional boxer	Domestic violence
Gavin McInnes	Canada	Far-right activist and founder of the Proud Boys	Links to the Proud Boys, a white supremacist hate group classified as an extremist group by the FBI
Candace Owens	United States	Conservative political commentator	Downplaying the Holocaust's impact. According to the Minister for Immigration and Multicultural Affairs, "Candace Owens has the capacity to incite discord in almost every direction."
Bilal Philips	Canada, Jamaica	Islamic scholar	Alleged links to terrorism and seeming to condone suicide bombers
Tommy Robinson	United Kingdom	Far-right activist and co-founder of the English Defence League	Substantial criminal record
Simcha Rothman	Israel	Politician	"Seeking to spread division"
Bezalel Smotrich	Israel	Politician	Inciting settler violence against Palestinians in the West Bank
Bassem Tamimi	Palestine	Activist	Views about ongoing political tensions in the Middle East
Ye	United States	Rapper	Promoting Nazism through his song "Heil Hitler"
Milo Yiannopoulos	United Kingdom	Far-right activist	Comments about the Christchurch mosque shootings

== Previously banned ==
Name	Country of origin	Occupation	Reason banned	Ban lifted
Chris Brown	United States	Singer	Domestic violence	Undecided (ban applied in 2015)
Peter Chingoka	Zimbabwe	Cricket administrator	Connections to Robert Mugabe	2022 (deceased)
Novak Djokovic	Serbia	Tennis player	Deported on health and good-order grounds as there were concerns his presence would undermine the country's COVID-19 vaccine rollout	2022 (originally banned for three years under the Migration Act 1958, though overturned by Immigration Minister Andrew Giles)
Dick Gregory	United States	Actor and social critic	Government officials fearing he would "stir up demonstrations against the Vietnam War"	2017 (deceased)
George Lincoln Rockwell	United States	Politician and neo-Nazi	Governmental concern about neo-Nazi, extremist rhetoric	1967 (deceased)
Snoop Dogg	United States	Rapper	Convictions for drugs and firearms offences	2008 (ban applied in 2007)
Skepta (Joseph Junior Adenuga)	United Kingdom	Rapper	Punching a man at a nightclub in Melbourne in 2016	2019
Tyler, The Creator (Tyler Gregory Okanoma)	United States	Rapper	Alleged promotion of violence against women	2019 (ban claimed to be in effect around 2015)
Mike Tyson	United States	Professional boxer	Criminal record, including rape charges	2012 (ban applied in 2001); granted a temporary visa
Vjekoslav Vrančić	Yugoslavia	High-ranked Ustaše officer	Terroristic activities with extreme right-wing Argentine political groups	1990 (deceased)

== See also ==
- Travel ban
- List of people banned from entering Canada
- List of people banned from entering China
- List of people banned from entering Ukraine
- List of people banned from entering the United Kingdom
- List of people banned from entering the United States
