= List of people banned from entering the United States =

The following is a list of notable people who are or were barred from entering the United States. The Bureau of Immigration and Customs Enforcement (ICE) of the United States Department of Homeland Security (DHS) handles deportation in the United States, often in conjunction with advice from the U.S. Department of State. Such bans are often temporary, depending on the circumstances of each case; however, anyone previously deported or denaturalized is automatically barred from re-entering the United States without a waiver issued by the U.S. Department of State.

== Currently banned ==
Individual	Nationality	Occupation	Reason(s) for ban
Omar Abdulkadir Artan	Somalia	Soccer referee	Suspected links to Al-Shabaab.
Hamid Aboutalebi	Iran	Diplomat and envoy to the United Nations	Played a role as a translator for the militants who stormed the American Embassy in Tehran in 1979 and held 52 American citizens hostage for 444 days.
Saud al-Qahtani	Saudi Arabia	Consultant and former royal court advisor	Reportedly oversaw the killing of Jamal Khashoggi, among other interrogations and torture.
Tareck El Aissami	Venezuela	Politician and former Vice President of Venezuela (2017-2018)	Allegations of major drug trafficking and ties to Hezbollah.
Arnoldo Alemán	Nicaragua	81st President of Nicaragua (1997-2002)	Political corruption scandals.
Maher Arar	Canada; Syria	Telecommunications engineer	Suspected of being a member of Al Qaeda.
Hussein Arnous	Syria	68th Prime Minister of Syria (2020-2024)	Continuous support for the Assad regime.
Julian Assange	Australia	Co-founder of WikiLeaks	Pleaded guilty for violating the Espionage Act.
Shaun Attwood	United Kingdom	Former ecstasy distributor turned YouTuber	After serving two years in Maricopa County Jail prior to sentencing, Attwood pleaded guilty for a sentence of nine and a half years, and served the balance of his sentence in the Arizona Department of Corrections. Banned from entering the United States for life following his return to the United Kingdom.
Hokkons Baules	Palau	President of the Senate of Palau	Accused of involvement in corruption.
Sali Berisha	Albania	2nd President of Albania (1992-1997) and 32nd Prime Minister of Albania (2005-2013)	Involved in significant corruption, such as misappropriation of public funds and interfering with public processes, as well as enriching political allies and family members at the expense of the Albanian public.
José Bové	France	Farmer and alter-globalization activist	Past prosecutions for "moral crimes".
Abdalá Bucaram	Ecuador	38th President of Ecuador (1996-1997)	"Involvement in significant corruption, including misappropriation of public funds, accepting bribes, and interfering with public processes."
Roberto Sandoval Castañeda	Mexico	Former Governor of Nayarit	Allegations of collaborating with drug dealers.
Raúl Castro	Cuba	Former First Secretary of the Communist Party of Cuba (2011-2021); brother of Fidel Castro	Human rights violations and support for Nicolas Maduro's regime.
Chen Quanguo	China	Communist Party secretary of Xinjiang (2016-2021)	Involvement in the persecution of Uyghurs in China.
Rafael Correa	Ecuador	45th President of Ecuador (2007-2017)	Corruption; "...accepting bribes, including through political contributions, in exchange for granting favorable government contracts."
Pete Doherty	United Kingdom	Singer	Drug-related arrests and convictions in the United Kingdom; denied entry in June 2010 after spending 10 hours in detention in New York's JFK Airport, despite having a visa.
Isabel dos Santos	Angola	Businesswoman and daughter of José Eduardo dos Santos	"Significant corruption by misappropriating public funds for her personal benefit."
Tom Doshi	Albania	Former member of Albanian Parliament (2005-2021)	Allegations of significant corruption.
Liviu Dragnea	Romania	Politician and former President of the Chamber of Deputies (2016-2019)	Involvement in significant corruption.
Alejandro Giammattei	Guatemala	51st President of Guatemala (2020-2024)	Allegations of “involvement in significant corruption” during his presidency, namely "accepting bribes in exchange for the performance of his public functions".
Gabriel Escarrer Jaume	Spain	Businessman & CEO of Meliá Hotels International	Having business interests in Cuba.
Carrie Johnson	United Kingdom	Wife of former British Prime Minister Boris Johnson, media consultant	Visiting Somaliland as an independent country, which the United States does not recognize (viewing it as part of Somalia). Applicants under the electronic system for travel authorisation (ESTA) visa waiver programme, which allows Britons to spend up to 90 days in the US, are asked whether they have visited Somalia since March 2011.
Abdel Rahman Jumma	Sudan	Rapid Support Forces commander	Ordering the assassination of Khamis Abakar, governor of West Darfur state during the War in Sudan (2023).
Ramzan Kadyrov	Russia	Head of the Chechen Republic (2007–present)	Violations of human rights, including torture and extrajudicial killings.
Cristina Fernández de Kirchner	Argentina	56th President of Argentina (2007-2015)	"Significant corruption" charges.
Daniel Kinahan	Ireland	Boxing promoter and crime boss	Suspected of involvement in organized crime.
Ihor Kolomoyskyi	Cyprus; Israel	Former Governor of Dnipropetrovsk Oblast and businessman	Corruption and being a "threat to the Ukrainian public's faith in democratic institutions".
Andrew Krakouer	Australia	Former Australian rules footballer	Prior convictions relating to assault.
Grigory Leps	Russia	Singer-songwriter	Alleged connections to the Brothers' Circle.
Adriatik Llalla	Albania	General Prosecutor of the Republic of Albania (2012-2017)	Involvement in significant corruption.
Paul Makonda	Tanzania	Regional Commissioner of Arusha	"...involvement in gross violations of human rights, which include the flagrant denial of the right to life, liberty, or the security of persons."
Nahum Manbar	Israel	Businessman	Accused of selling components for mustard gas and nerve gas to Iran in defiance of a US embargo.
Liza Maza	Philippines	Activist, politician	Accused the United States federal government of human rights violations, was due to testify at a tribunal in Washington, D.C.
Bernadette Devlin McAliskey	United Kingdom	Independent Republican activist, UK Member of Parliament	Involvement with the Irish National Liberation Army (INLA).
Thierry Meyssan	France	Journalist, conspiracy theorist, and political activist	Active promotion of misinformation about the United States.
Min Aung Hlaing	Myanmar	Head of Burmese military junta (2021–present)	Involvement in the Rohingya genocide.
Ibrahim Mousawi	Lebanon	Journalist and spokesman for Hezbollah	Links with Hezbollah.
Azatbek Omurbekov	Russia	Military officer	Gross violations of human rights during the Bucha massacre.
Daniel Ortega	Nicaragua	President of Nicaragua (2007–present)	Repression of political opponents during the 2018–2022 Nicaraguan protests, reports of human rights abuses, and committing electoral fraud.
Ed Ou	Canada	Photojournalist	Name matches a "person of interest" on an unspecified U.S. federal law enforcement watch list.
Bilal Philips	Canada; Jamaica	Islamic scholar	Alleged links to terrorism and seeming to condone suicide bombers.
Vlad Plahotniuc	Moldova	Businessman and former member of Parliament	Involvement in significant corruption.
Marian Price	United Kingdom	Former Provisional Irish Republican Army volunteer	Terrorist activities, including involvement in the 1973 Old Bailey bombing.
Tarek William Saab	Venezuela	Politician and lawyer	Links with international terrorist organizations and subversive groups.
Martin Sellner	Austria	Neo-Nazi, Neue Rechte and Identitarian activist	Links to the 2019 Christchurch mosque shootings in New Zealand.
Shavendra Silva	Sri Lanka	Sri Lanka Army officer	Alleged war crimes in the Sri Lankan civil war.
Mike Sonko	Kenya	Second governor of Nairobi County (2017-2020)	Involvement in significant corruption.
John Stewart	United Kingdom	Environmental campaigner	Undisclosed reasons believed to be linked with his campaigning.
Mark Thatcher	United Kingdom	Businessman and son of former Prime Minister Margaret Thatcher	Conviction in South Africa related to the 2004 Equatorial Guinea coup attempt.
Bovi Ugboma	Nigeria	Comedian	Visa issues.
Bob Vylan	United Kingdom	Rap duo	Led a chant of "Death, death to the IDF".
Amos Wako	Kenya	4th Attorney General of Kenya (1991-2011)	Allegations of "significant" corruption.
Wiranto	Indonesia	5th Chairman of the Presidential Advisory Council (since 2019)	Human rights violations and suspected war crimes.
Stephen Yaxley-Lennon (a.k.a. Tommy Robinson)	United Kingdom	Far-right activist	Robinson pleaded guilty at Southwark Crown Court to using someone else's passport to travel to the United States in September 2012, and was sentenced in January 2013 to 10 months' imprisonment.
Zhu Hailun	China	Retired politician	Involvement in the persecution of Uyghurs in China.

== Previously banned ==
Individual	Nationality	Occupation	Reason(s) for ban	Ban lifted
Lily Allen	United Kingdom	Singer	Criminal record, including assault charges on paparazzi.	2008
Gerry Adams	United Kingdom	Politician, Irish republican president of Sinn Féin	Refusing to renounce violence during The Troubles.	January 1994; President Bill Clinton, on recommendation from congressional Democrats and the National Security Council (despite opposition from the British government and the State Department), granted Adams a 48-hour visa to attend a conference in New York City to negotiate an IRA truce during the peace process. Adams would visit the U.S. on several further occasions.
Mathangi Arulpragasam (a.k.a. M.I.A.)	United Kingdom	Rapper	Supporting the Eelam Revolutionary Organisation of Students (EROS), where her father was one of the founders.	2017
Shiro Azuma	Japan	Soldier	Participation in the Nanjing Massacre.	2006 (deceased)
Fulgencio Batista	Cuba	Military officer and politician	Human rights violations and committing electoral fraud.	1973 (deceased)
Mike Bailey	Canada	Professional wrestler	Attempted to enter the country without the correct working visa in place.	2022
Omar Beltré	Dominican Republic	Professional baseball player	Involvement in an immigration marriage fraud ring in the Dominican Republic between 2004–2005.	2010
Conrad Black	Canada United Kingdom	Publisher and businessman	Mail fraud and obstruction of justice convictions.	2019, after President Donald Trump granted him a presidential pardon.
Kurt Blome	West Germany	Nazi microbiologist and scientist	Involvement with human experimentation in Nazi Germany.	1969 (deceased)
Desi Bouterse	Suriname	8th President of Suriname	Involvement in the extrajudicial killings known as the December murders in 1982.	2024 (deceased)
Shane Bunting (a.k.a. Madchild)	Canada	Rapper	Alleged links to the Hells Angels Motorcycle Club.	2013
Hortensia Bussi de Allende	Chile	Former First Lady of Chile, widow of Salvador Allende	Affiliation with Allende and opposition to Chilean military dictatorship; barred from entering in 1983 after an invitation by the Roman Catholic Archdiocese of San Francisco on the basis that "her entry to make various public appearances and speeches has been determined to be prejudicial to U.S. interests".	2009 (deceased)
V. Gordon Childe	Australia	Archaeologist	Having Marxist beliefs.	1957 (deceased)
Roberto d'Aubuisson	El Salvador	Military officer, neo-fascist politician and death squad leader	Threatening the life of James Richard Cheek.	1984
Alexandre de Moraes	Brazil	Justice of the Supreme Federal Court in Brazil	Alleged political persecution against Jair Bolsonaro and violations of the basic rights of Brazilians and Americans.	2025
Novak Djokovic	Serbia	Professional tennis player	Not meeting COVID-19 entry requirements, while not being vaccinated for COVID-19. Vaccine waiver request was denied by Department of Homeland Security.	2023
Máire Drumm	Ireland	Vice-President of Sinn Féin	Criminal convictions and having connections with the IRA.	1976 (deceased)
Daniel Dumile (a.k.a. MF Doom)	United Kingdom	Rapper	Couldn’t or didn’t prove that he was living in the U.S. prior to 1972, despite records showing he arrived in the country prior to 1972.	2020 (deceased)
Kyle Falconer	United Kingdom	Lead singer for The View	Drug-related conviction in the United Kingdom.	2011
Tyson Fury	United Kingdom	Professional boxer	Links with Daniel Kinahan, who is subject to sanctions by the U.S. government's Office of Foreign Assets Control.	2026
Fernando Gabeira	Brazil	Former federal deputy for the State of Rio de Janeiro (1995-2011)	Considered a terrorist for his role in the kidnapping of American ambassador Charles Burke Elbrick.	2009
Dave Hilton Sr.	Canada	Boxer	1961 conviction for drunken driving and assault indictments.	2023 (deceased)
Sebastian Horsley	United Kingdom	Artist and writer	Issues of moral turpitude.	2010 (deceased)
Yusuf Islam (a.k.a. Cat Stevens)	United Kingdom	Singer	Apparent links to terrorism.	2006
Joseph Kobzon	Russia	Singer	Allegedly having close associations with drug trafficking, illicit arms trading, and Russian mafia in Moscow.	2018 (deceased)
Nigella Lawson	United Kingdom	Chef, author and TV host of The Taste	Drug-related admission in the United Kingdom.	2014
Georg Leibbrandt	West Germany	Nazi German bureaucrat and diplomat	Participation in the Holocaust.	1982 (deceased)
Nelson Mandela	South Africa	Revolutionary, anti-apartheid dissident, leader of African National Congress, later first post-apartheid President of South Africa	Banned after the apartheid regime of South Africa designated the ANC as a terrorist organization in 1960, requiring Mandela to receive a waiver from the U.S. Secretary of State to visit the United States.	2008, after President George W. Bush signed an act to formally lift it.
Diego Maradona	Argentina	Former soccer player and coach	Various criminal convictions in Italy, Argentina, Croatia and other countries.	2020 (deceased)
Gabriel García Márquez	Colombia	Novelist and was awarded the Nobel Prize in 1982.	Banned from the U.S. due to his ties to the Colombian Communist Party in the 1950s and later for his fondness for Fidel Castro.	1995, by President Bill Clinton, who happened to be an admirer of the writer and would dine with him in 1996.
Nicole Matthews	Canada	Professional wrestler	Caught using a travel visa instead of a work visa to work independent shows.	2023
Narendra Modi	India	Former Chief Minister of Gujarat and current Prime Minister of India	Involvement in the 2002 Gujarat riots; banned in 2005.	2014, due to diplomatic status per United Nations policy when elected Prime Minister of India. Hosted as a state guest by the United States in 2023.
Farley Mowat	Canada	Writer and environmentalist	Having communist sympathies.	1990
Amjad Nasser	Jordan	Journalist and poet	Undisclosed reasons.	2019 (deceased)
Antonio Negri	Italy	Marxist philosopher	Criminal charges and involvement in the Moro case.	2023 (deceased)
George O'Dowd (a.k.a. Boy George)	United Kingdom	Singer and fashion designer	Criminal convictions in the United States in 2006 and the United Kingdom in 2008.	2014
Alexi Ogando	Dominican Republic	Professional baseball player	Involvement in an immigration marriage fraud ring in the Dominican Republic between 2004–2005.	2010
Pogo	Australia	Electronic music artist/producer	Did not have necessary work visa.	2021
Yusuf al-Qaradawi	Egypt	Islamic scholar and chairman of the International Union of Muslim Scholars.	Sanctioned suicide bombing.	2022 (deceased)
Tariq Ramadan	Switzerland	Academic, educator and author (Western Muslims and the Future of Islam)	Gave money to Hamas.	2010
Chad Rook	Canada	Actor, director, writer, and producer.	Arrested at Peace Arch Border Crossing and accused of attempting to enter the United States to work without a visa permit.	2014
Hans Joachim Sewering	Germany	Doctor and former member of the SS	Accused of sending more than 900 disabled patients to their deaths under the Nazi euthanasia program during the Holocaust.	2010 (deceased)
Bill Stewart	Canada	Ice hockey coach	Smuggled an undocumented Ukrainian player across the Canada–United States border multiple times in 2000 while head coach of the Barrie Colts.	2014 or earlier
Prabowo Subianto	Indonesia	President of Indonesia and retired army general	Alleged human rights abuses.	2020
Dobroslav Trnka	Slovakia	Lawyer	Corruption.	2023 (deceased)
Ilija Trojanow	Bulgaria Germany	Writer and publisher	Undisclosed reasons.	2013
Alan Turing	United Kingdom	Mathematician and computer scientist	Criminal conviction for homosexuality.	1954 (deceased)
Kurt Waldheim	Austria	Diplomat and politician, former Secretary-General of the United Nations and President of Austria (1986–1992)	Nazi affiliations and activities during World War II, deemed persona non grata.	2007 (deceased)
Amy Winehouse	United Kingdom	Singer	Drug and assault convictions in the United Kingdom.	2009

== See also ==
- List of people banned from entering Australia
- List of people banned from entering Canada
- List of people banned from entering China
- List of people banned from entering Ukraine
- List of people banned from entering the United Kingdom
- List of people deported from the United States
- List of denaturalized former citizens of the United States
- Illegal immigration to the United States
- U.S. Immigration and Customs Enforcement
