= List of people banned from entering the United Kingdom =

The Home Office, a United Kingdom government department, has, from August 2005 to 31 March 2009, excluded 101 individuals from the UK for having "engaged in unacceptable behaviour". Of those, 22 were excluded by then-Home Secretary Jacqui Smith between 28 October 2008 and 31 March 2009. On 5 May 2009, Smith publicly "named and shamed" sixteen of those individuals. In addition to the sixteen, other people are or have been banned from the United Kingdom.

The individuals are not necessarily banned from the British overseas territories, which have their own immigration regulations.

Smith's successor as Home Secretary, Alan Johnson, ended the policy of naming people who are banned from entering Britain.

== Home Office 2023 list of hate promoters ==
The following 16 names were published:

Individual	Nationality	Occupation	Official reason for ban
Abdullah Qadri Al Ahdal	Saudi Arabia; Yemen	Muslim extremist preacher	"Considered to be engaging in unacceptable behaviour by seeking to foment, justify or glorify terrorist violence in furtherance of particular beliefs and fostering hatred that might lead to inter-community violence".
Yunis Al Astal	Palestine	Muslim cleric and Hamas member of the Palestinian parliament	"Considered to be engaging in unacceptable behaviour by seeking to foment, justify or glorify terrorist violence in furtherance of particular beliefs and to provoke others to terrorist acts".
Stephen Donald Black	United States	Extremist founder of the neo-Nazi website Stormfront	"Considered to be engaging in unacceptable behaviour by promoting serious criminal activity and fostering hatred, which might lead to inter-community violence in the United Kingdom".
Wagdy Abd el-Hamied Mohamed Ghoneim	Egypt	Preacher, writer	"Considered to be engaging in unacceptable behaviour by seeking to foment, justify or glory terrorist violence in furtherance of particular beliefs and to provoke others to commit terrorist acts".
Erich Gliebe	United States	Neo-Nazi, far-right political leader	"Considered to be engaging in unacceptable behaviour by justifying terrorist violence, provoking others to commit serious crime and fostering racial hatred".
Mike Guzovsky	United States; Israel	Jewish militant	"Considered to be engaging in unacceptable behaviour by seeking to foment, justify or glorify terrorist violence in furtherance of particular beliefs and to provoke others to terrorist acts".
Safwat Hijazi	Egypt	Imam, television preacher	"Considered to be engaging in unacceptable behaviour by glorifying terrorist violence".
Nasr Javed	Pakistan	Senior operative of the Kashmiri militant group Jammat Ud Dawa	"Considered to be engaging in unacceptable behaviour by seeking to foment, justify or glorify terrorist violence in furtherance of particular beliefs".
Abdul Alim Musa (deceased)	United States	Founder and director of the hate group As-Sabiqun	"Considered to be engaging in unacceptable behaviour by fomenting and glorifying terrorist violence in furtherance of his particular beliefs and seeking to provoke others to terrorist acts".
Fred Phelps (deceased)	United States	Pastor and Founder of anti-LGBT group Westboro Baptist Church	"Considered to be engaging in unacceptable behaviour by fostering hatred such as homophobia, transphobia and biphobia, which might lead to inter-community violence in the United Kingdom".
Artur Ryno and Pavel Skachevsky	Russia	Violent gang leaders and mass murderers	"Considered to be engaging in unacceptable behaviour by fomenting serious criminal activity and seeking to provoke others to serious criminal acts".
Amir Siddique	Pakistan	Imam, preacher	"Considered to be engaging in unacceptable behaviour by fomenting terrorist violence in furtherance of particular beliefs".
Michael Savage	United States	Right-wing radio host	"Considered to be engaging in unacceptable behaviour by seeking to provoke others to serious criminal acts and fostering hatred which might lead to inter-community violence".

== Other notable individuals banned or refused entry ==
The following individuals are temporarily or permanently refused entry into the United Kingdom.

Individual	Nationality	Occupation	Reason banned
Asma al-Assad	Syria; United Kingdom	Former First Lady of Syria (2000–24)	Allegations involving the "systematic approach to the torture and murder of civilians, including with the use of chemical weapons" and incitement of terrorist acts.
Siccatune Alcock (aka Jah Cure)	Jamaica	Reggae musician	Criminal convictions in Jamaica.
Zokirjon Almatov (Note: This individual is or was also banned from entering any country within the European Union.)	Uzbekistan	Politician	War crimes committed in Uzbekistan.
Steven L. Anderson	United States	Leader/pastor of the Faithful Word Baptist Church, which has been criticised for its anti-LGBT views.	UK government concerns over anti-LGBT rhetoric; has been banned from at least 34 countries.
Jeffrey Atkins Sr. (aka Ja Rule)	United States	Rapper	Criminal record.
Lutz Bachmann	Germany	Founder of the Pegida movement	UK government expressed that he is "not conducive to the public good".
Omar Bakri	Syria	Salafi Islamist militant leader; hate cleric	Involvement in London bombings, militant activity in Lebanon.
Moshe Levi Ben-David (aka Shyne)	Belize	Rapper	Criminal convictions in the United States, travel document issues.
Itamar Ben-Gvir	Israel	Politician	Allegedly inciting settler violence against Palestinians in the West Bank.
Todd Bentley	Canada	Evangelist	UK government concerns over violent behaviour committed towards others in the United States.
Sali Berisha	Albania	2nd President of Albania (1992–1997) and 32nd Prime Minister of Albania (2005–2013)	Links to organised crime groups and criminals that pose a risk to public safety in Albania and the UK.
Steven Best	United States	Philosopher and animal rights activist	UK government concerns over him "fomenting and justifying terrorist violence and seeking to provoke others to terrorist acts and fomenting other serious criminal activity and seeking to provoke others to serious criminal acts."
Julien Blanc	United States; Switzerland	Dating coach, speaker	UK government concerns over promotion of sexual assault.
Chris Brown	United States	Singer	Criminal convictions in the United States
Renaud Camus	France	Novelist	Banned due to his promotion of Great Replacement Theory, the home office said his presence was not "conducive to the public good".
Dwayne Michael Carter, Jr. (aka Lil Wayne)	United States	Rapper	Criminal convictions in the United States.
Duane "Dog" Chapman	United States	Bounty hunter	Criminal conviction in the United States.
Miguel Orlando Collins (aka Sizzla)	Jamaica	Reggae musician	Anti-gay lyrics in his recordings, as well as advocating for violence against LGBT people.
Mohammed Al Deeni	Iraq	Cleric	UK government concerns over pro-jihadist views against Syria.
Louis Farrakhan	United States	Leader of the Nation of Islam	UK government concerns over expressing anti-Semitic and racially divisive views.
Moshe Feiglin	Israel	Politician and activist	UK government concerns over anti-Palestinian beliefs, support for war against them and spreading of hate.
Don Francisco	United States	Gospel singer	Failing to obtain a religious worker visa and a certificate of sponsorship.
Pamela Geller	United States	Anti-Islamic and political activist	UK government concerns over anti-Islamic beliefs and spreading of hate
Valentina Gomez	United States; Colombia	Political activist	UK government concerns over anti-Islamic rhetoric and actions including Quran burning and "not being conducive to the public good."
Gideon Gono	Zimbabwe	Banker, politician	Connections to Robert Mugabe, human rights abuses
Joan Guzmán	Dominican Republic	Boxer	Unknown
Matthew Heimbach	United States	Neo-Nazi	UK government concerns over neo-Nazi and anti-Semitic rhetoric
Daniel Hernandez (aka 6ix9ine)	United States	Rapper	Past criminal offences
Terry Jones	United States	Anti-Islamic right wing activist and pastor	UK government concerns over anti-Islamic rhetoric and actions
Omar bin Laden	Saudi Arabia	Contractor, businessman, son of Osama bin Laden	Connections to Al-Qaeda
Dieudonné M'bala M'bala	France	Comedian	UK government concerns over anti-Semitic rhetoric and actions
Thomas Mapfumo	Zimbabwe	Musician	Issue with visa
Mandla Mandela	South Africa	Tribal chief of the Mvezo Traditional Council and grandson of Nelson Mandela	Concerns about "inflammatory rhetoric"; openly supporting Hamas and Hezbollah, as well as close links to the Iranian regime.
Jacek Międlar	Poland	Far-right Polish priest	UK government concerns over spreading hate speech
Marko Milošević	Serbia	Organised crime figurehead, son of Slobodan Milošević	Organized crime activities in Eastern Europe, banned from entire European Union
Yosef Mizrachi	United States	Haredi rabbi and public speaker	UK government concerns over spreading hate and extremism.
Ibrahim Mousawi	Lebanon	Lebanese journalist, spokesperson for Hezbollah	Connections to Hezbollah.
Grace Mugabe	Zimbabwe	Robert Mugabe's wife, former First Lady of Zimbabwe	Involvement with Robert Mugabe
Zakir Naik	India	Islamic televangelist	UK government concerns over glorifying terrorism and promoting violence.
David Oyedepo	Nigeria	Preacher	Allegations of church corruption.
Rasmus Paludan	Denmark; Sweden	Far-right political leader and anti-Islamic activist	UK government concerns over anti-Islamic rhetoric and actions including Quran burning.
Shirley Phelps-Roper	United States	Senior operative of the anti-LGBT group the Westboro Baptist Church	UK government concerns over anti-LGBT rhetoric.
Bilal Philips	Canada	Islamic scholar	Alleged links to terrorism and seeming to condone suicide bombers.
Hasan Piker	United States	Political Activist	According to the UK government, his "presence in the UK may not be conducive to the public good".
Ronnie Radke	United States	Lead singer of Falling In Reverse	Criminal convictions in the United States.
Maryam Rajavi	Iran	Leader of the People's Mujahedin of Iran	Diplomatic relations between UK and Iran at risk.
Martin Sellner	Austria	Far-right political leader, Identitarian, anti-Islamic extremist	UK government concerns over promoting violence and hatred (after his banning, he later became a chief suspect in Austrian investigation regarding involvement in 2019 Christchurch shooting)
Vojislav Šešelj	Serbia	Politician	War crimes committed in Serbia.
Thaksin Shinawatra (Note: This individual was previously head of government of their respective country)	Thailand	Businessman, politician, and former Prime Minister of Thailand (2001-2006)	Criminal convictions in Thailand
Bezalel Smotrich	Israel	Politician	Allegedly inciting settler violence against Palestinians in the West Bank.
Edward Snowden	United States	Computer programmer	Decided at American government's request; leaking of American government documents.
Abdul Somad	Indonesia	Islamic preacher and scholar	Holding views that are considered as Islamic extremist.
Lauren Southern	Canada	Alt-right political activist	UK government concerns over alt-right rhetoric, distributing alleged anti-Islamic material
Richard Spencer	United States	White supremacist	UK government concerns over white supremacist rhetoric, banned from entire European Union.
Robert Spencer	United States	Anti-Islamic activist	UK government concerns over anti-Islamic beliefs and spreading of hate.
Ziad Takieddine	France; Lebanon	Businessman	Allegations of fraud.
Dominik Tarczyński	Poland	Politician	UK government concerns over "not being conducive to the public good."
Yang Tengbo	China	Businessman	Government concerns regarding espionage and undue foreign political interference
Mike Tyson	United States	Former boxer	Criminal convictions in the United States.
Cenk Uygur	United States; Turkey	Political activist	According to the UK government, his "presence in the UK may not be conducive to the public good".
Daryush Valizadeh	United States	Blogger	UK government concerns over promoting rape.
Eva Vlaardingerbroek	Netherlands	Far-right political commentator and activist	UK government concerns over "not being conducive to the public good."
Jerry Vlasak	United States	Animal rights activist	UK government concerns over rhetoric concerning the use of violence against animal researchers
Mark Weber	United States	Holocaust denier	UK government concerns over Holocaust denial.
Ye (formerly "Kanye West")	United States	Rapper	UK government concerns over antisemitic, racist and pro-Nazi comments.
Gary Yourofsky	United States	Animal rights activist	Criminal convictions in the United States and Canada.
Rafal Ziemkiewicz	Poland	Science fiction author and right-wing publicist	Government concerns of propagating racism including Islamophobia and Holocaust denial
Andreas Malm	Sweden	Journalist and academic	UK government concerned presence “may not be considered to be conducive to the public good”.

== Individuals previously banned or refused entry ==
These individuals have at some point been banned from entering the United Kingdom, or at least temporarily refused entry; these individuals are either deceased or have eventually been allowed entry.

Individual	Nationality	Occupation	Reason banned	Ban lifted
Gholam Reza Aghazadeh	Iran	Politician, atomic energy chief in Iranian government	Development of nuclear weapons in Iran	2016, with sanctions easing following establishment of Joint Comprehensive Plan of Action
Yusuf al-Qaradawi	Egypt Qatar	Islamic theologian, Muslim Brotherhood member, radio host	UK government concerns over condoning of Palestinian suicide bombings against Israelis	2022 (deceased)
Serge Aurier	Ivory Coast	Footballer	Criminal conviction in France	2017, after his suspended prison sentence was converted to a fine
Abu Bakr al-Baghdadi	Iraq	Former leader and one of the top commanders of the international terrorist organization "Islamic State"	Links to the Islamic State	2019 (deceased)
Menachem Begin	Israel	Politician, Prime Minister of Israel, head of terrorist organization the Irgun	Terrorism activities in Israel and Palestine	1972
Calvin Broadus, Jr. (aka Snoop Dogg)	United States	Rapper	Violent incident at Heathrow Airport	2010, after it was overturned on appeal
Lenny Bruce	United States	Comedian	Government concern about irreverent comedic routines	1966 (deceased)
Momir Bulatović (Note: This individual was previously head of state of their respective country)	Montenegro	Politician, President of Montenegro	War crimes committed in Serbia and Montenegro	2019 (deceased)
Pavle Bulatović	Serbia and Montenegro	Politician	War crimes committed in Serbia	2000 (deceased)
Peter Chingoka	Zimbabwe	Cricket administrator	Connections to Robert Mugabe	2022 (deceased)
Stokely Carmichael (aka Kwame Ture)	Trinidad and Tobago United States	Civil rights activist and pan-Africanist	Government concerns about stirring racial violence	1983
Ivica Dačić	Serbia	Politician	Human rights abuses	Unknown (ban applied in 1998), due to political status
Texas Guinan	United States	Actress, entrepreneur	Activities during American Prohibition	1933 (deceased)
L. Ron Hubbard	United States	Founder of Scientology	Government concerns about Scientology being socially harmful, criminal conviction for fraud in France	1986 (deceased)
Mohammad Ali Jafari	Iran	Politician, head of Iranian Revolutionary Guard	Development of nuclear weapons in Iran	2016, with sanctions easing following establishment of Joint Comprehensive Plan of Action
Meir Kahane	Israel United States	Orthodox rabbi, writer, ultra-nationalist politician	Government concerns about promoting far-right violence	1990 (deceased)
Salman Khan	India	Actor	Convicted in a court of offence, including a poaching case.	2017
Samir Kuntar	Lebanon	Hezbollah and Palestine Liberation Front member	UK government concerns of justifying terrorist violence and provoking others to commit terrorist acts.	2015 (deceased)
Osama bin Laden	Saudi Arabia	Terrorist, founder of al-Qaeda	Banned over connections to Islamist militant groups in Algeria, Somalia, and Yemen. Exclusion order issued after Bin Laden formed the Advice and Reform Committee in London and considered seeking asylum in Britain after King Fahd revoked his Saudi citizenship in 1994.	2011 (deceased)
Alexander Lukashenko (Note: This individual is currently serving as head of state of their respective country)	Belarus	Politician, President of Belarus	Mass human rights abuses in Belarus, banned from entering entire European Union	2016
Mirjana Marković	Serbia	Political leader, former First Lady of Yugoslavia	Association with Slobodan Milošević	2019 (deceased)
James Miller	United States	Parachutist	Criminal convictions in the UK.	2002 (deceased)
Borislav Milošević	Serbia	Diplomat	Association with war crimes committed by younger brother Slobodan Milošević.	2013 (deceased)
Slobodan Milošević	Serbia and Montenegro	Politician, former President of Yugoslavia	War crimes (including genocide and ethnic cleansing) committed in Bosnia, Kosovo and Albania.	2006 (deceased)
Sun Myung Moon	South Korea	Founder of the Unification Church	Government concerns about methods used in attracting followers	2005
Robert Mugabe	Zimbabwe	Politician, President of Zimbabwe	War crimes and mass human rights abuses committed in Zimbabwe	2019 (deceased)
Pablo Neruda	Chile	Poet, diplomat, politician	Connections to communism	1973 (deceased)
Tomislav Nikolić	Serbia	Politician, former President of Serbia	Mass human rights abuses	Unknown (ban applied in 1998), due to political status
Tyler Gregory Okonma (aka Tyler, the Creator)	United States	Rapper	Government concerns about lyrics involving promotion of terrorism, hate and anti-gay rhetoric	2018, ban was only 3 to 5 years
Fred Phelps	United States	Founder of anti-LGBT organization the Westboro Baptist Church	Government concern about anti-LGBT rhetoric.	2014 (deceased)
George Raft	United States	Film actor	Illegal gambling in the UK.	1980 (deceased)
Bhagwan Shree Rajneesh (aka Osho)	India	Founder of the Rajneesh movement	Government concerns about the brainwashing methods used in the Rajneesh movement.	1990 (deceased)
George Lincoln Rockwell	United States	Politician, neo-Nazi	Government concern about neo-Nazi, extremist rhetoric.	1967 (deceased)
Dmitri Shostakovich	Soviet Union	Composer and pianist	Connections to the Soviet Communist Party.	1975 (deceased)
Trevor Smith (aka Busta Rhymes)	United States	Rapper	Criminal convictions in the United States.	2008; detained for 12 hours in London
Albert Speer	West Germany	Minister of Armaments and War Production in Nazi Germany	Nazi war crimes.	1973
Martha Stewart	United States	Celebrity homemaker, businesswoman	Criminal convictions in the United States.	Unknown; returned to London in 2017 (ban applied in 2008)
Jens Jørgen Thorsen	Denmark	Director, screenwriter, producer	Intent to produce The Many Faces of Jesus, a film depicting Jesus as gay	2000 (deceased)
Aleksandar Vučić	Serbia	Politician, current President of Serbia	Mass human rights abuses	Unknown (ban applied in 1998), due to political status
Geert Wilders	Netherlands	Far-right politician, anti-Islamic activist	Government concern about anti-Islamic rhetoric	2009, after it was overturned on appeal

== See also ==
- Travel ban
- List of people banned from entering Australia
- List of people banned from entering Canada
- List of people banned from entering China
- List of people banned from entering Ukraine
- List of people banned from entering the United States
