= List of people banned from entering Canada =

List of people who are or were barred from Canada

This is a list of notable people who have been, or are currently, banned from entering Canada.

== Currently banned ==
Name	Country of origin	Occupation	Reason banned
Abdul-Rahman Al-Sudais	Saudi Arabia	One of the nine imams of the Grand Mosque of Mecca	Has made many anti-semitic remarks.
Steven Anderson	United States	Pastor and founder of New Independent Fundamentalist Baptist	Has called for death of the LGBT community and given antisemitic rhetoric.
Bill Ayers	United States	Retired professor and militant organizer	1969 conviction at an anti-war rally and having been involved “in criminal activity, in human rights violations or in organized crime."
Itamar Ben-Gvir	Israel	Politician	Inciting settler violence against Palestinians in the West Bank.
Wes Bentley	United States	Actor	Past drug convictions.
Chris Brown	United States	Singer	Declared "criminally inadmissible".
Jim Cornette	United States	Professional wrestling manager	Criminal record made up of assault charges and arrests.
Charley Crockett	United States	Country music singer	Past drug-related convictions.
Valery Gergiev	Russia	Conductor and opera company director	Supporting or benefiting from the Putin regime and Russia’s full-scale invasion of Ukraine.
Jeff Hardy	United States	Professional wrestler	Criminal record due to multiple DUIs.
David Irving	United Kingdom	Author and Holocaust denier	Criminal convictions in Germany, relating to his writing on the Holocaust.
Terry Jones	United States	Anti-Islamic activist and pastor	Previous legal infraction in the United States and because the German government has issued a complaint against him.
Kneecap	Ireland	Rap group	Having expressed support for designated terrorist groups
Dieudonné M'bala M'bala	France	Comedian and political activist	Outstanding criminal convictions
Dennis Mahon	United States	Right-wing terrorist and former Grand Wizard of the Ku Klux Klan	Grounds that he would likely commit an indictable offense.
Vitaly Malkin	Russia Israel	Business oligarch	Alleged involvement in money laundering and an international arms deals.
Chelsea Manning	United States	Whistleblower and activist	Criminal record.
Zakir Naik	India	Islamic Televangelist	Concerns over inciting Muslim youth to violence and extremism.
Thomas Partey	Ghana	Footballer	Falsely claimed he wasn't facing criminal charges.
Malik Zulu Shabazz	United States	Former chairman of the New Black Panther Party	Past rhetoric that violated Canadian hate laws
Viktor Sheiman	Belarus	Politician	Undermining democratic institutions
Bezalel Smotrich	Israel	Politician	Inciting settler violence against Palestinians in the West Bank.
The Game	United States	Rapper	Alleged gang ties in Los Angeles.
Gary Yourofsky	United States	Animal rights activist	Raided a fur farm in Ontario and released 1,542 minks in 1997.

== Previously banned ==
Name	Country of origin	Occupation	Reason banned	Ban lifted
50 Cent	United States	Rapper	Temporarily denied entry in 2005, due to criminal record and promoting gun violence in music.	Allowed to enter Canada on a temporary resident's permit.
Northern Calloway	United States	Actor	Criminal record.	1990 (deceased)
Coolio	United States	Rapper	Criminal record, including possession of a firearm.	2022 (deceased)
DMX	United States	Rapper	Criminal record.	2021 (deceased)
George Galloway	United Kingdom	Former Member of Parliament	Having expressed sympathy for the Taliban and allegedly providing financial aid to Hamas.	2010 (ban applied in 2009)
Ron Killings (aka R-Truth)	United States	Professional wrestler	Criminal record.	Returned in 2011 for a WWE live event (ban applied in 2008).
Winnie Mandela	South Africa	Anti-apartheid activist and wife of Nelson Mandela	Criminal record, including a conviction of kidnapping and assault.	2018 (deceased)
Antonio Negri	Italy	Marxist philosopher	Criminal charges and involvement in the Moro case.	2023 (deceased)
Lil Wayne	United States	Rapper	String of charges related to weapons and drugs.	Returned to Toronto in 2022 for a concert (ban applied in 2011).

== See also ==
- Travel ban
- List of people banned from entering Australia
- List of people banned from entering China
- List of people banned from entering Ukraine
- List of people banned from entering the United Kingdom
- List of people banned from entering the United States
