= South Africa African XI =

The South Africa African XI was a cricket team that played several matches in South Africa between 1973 and 1976, including two List A matches in the Gillette Cup.

South Africa was boycotted by the other cricket-playing nations in the early 1970s owing to the government's apartheid policy. The formation of the South Africa African XI – which consisted entirely of players classified as "African" under the apartheid laws – and its matches against visiting international teams and domestic teams were part of attempts by the South African cricket authorities to break down racial barriers in South African cricket so that South Africa might be re-admitted to international competition.

The D. H. Robins XI's tours of South Africa in 1973-74, 1974-75 and 1975-76 all included one-day matches against the South Africa African XI. The touring teams won all the matches by large margins.

In 1975-76 and 1976-77 the South Africa African XI competed in the Gillette Cup knockout competition. In 1975-76 they played Natal in Durban. Natal made 361 for 2, declaring after 54.2 of their allotted 60 overs, then dismissed the South Africa African XI for 78. In 1976-77 the South Africa African XI played Eastern Province in Port Elizabeth. Eastern Province made 345 for 2, declaring after 51 of their allotted 60 overs, then dismissed the South Africa African XI for 101.

Peter Chingoka, who later became President of the Zimbabwe Cricket Union, captained the South Africa African XI in both its Gillette Cup matches.
