= Sicarii (1989) =

Jewish terrorist cell

- סיקריים
- Formation: 1989
- Type: Paramilitary group
- Location: Israel
- Methods: Graffiti, Arson, Death Threats, Murder

Sicarii (Daggermen) was a Jewish paramilitary group active in Israel that took responsibility for a series of terrorist attacks between 1989 and 1990 on Palestinians and Jewish political and media figures sympathetic to the plight of Palestinians. They named themselves after the ancient Sicarii rebels, a group of Jewish zealots who opposed the Roman occupation of Judaea.

It is unknown whether the Sicarii were an organized group or a loose alliance of isolated extremists.

In March 1989, The Jerusalem Post described the Sicarii as "the most sought-after under group in Israel today". In one telephone call, a member claimed they "identified" with the Kach political party of Rabbi Meir Kahane, which was outlawed as racist in 1988. Investigation failed to identify the members of the group or to identify the culprits in the attacks that the group claimed responsibility for.

== Activities ==
Sicarii claimed responsibility for multiple attacks on leftist Jews and Palestinians. These included committing arson of apartments and cars owned by left-wing public figures; setting off a bomb near the home of a surgeon who had transplanted the heart of an IDF soldier into an East Jerusalem Arab; and the uprooting of trees along the Avenue of Righteous Gentiles at the Yad Vashem Holocaust memorial.

Some targets of the Sicarii' dummy grenades included Gershon Shaked, Hayim Be'er, Haaretz publisher Amos Schoken, and Hebrew University of Jerusalem rector Yoram Ben-Porat. Some victims of their arson attacks include Dan Almagor, Sesame Street TV actress Sarai Tzuriel and pollster Mina Zemach, who had published a survey saying that 54% of Israelis were in favor of peace talks with the PLO.

They also sent a number of threatening letters to public media figures, judges, moderate right and left-wing parties as well as ultra-Orthodox leaders.

They claimed responsibility for the shooting by a lone gunman of Palestinians outside Jerusalem's walled old city on April 10, 1989. The gunman was wearing an Israeli army uniform and shot down four Palestinian men with an Uzi machine gun. Sicarii claimed that the incident, which became known as the Jaffa Gate shooting, was an act of retaliation for the previous week's stoning attack on Jews at the Western Wall.

In early January 1990, Sicarii claimed responsibility for planting a dummy grenade under the car of the wife of deputy Prime Minister Shimon Peres. They also threatened to attack other members of the Knesset from the Labor Party and Ratz because they supported Palestinian peace demonstrations, and to execute a dozen activists of the Peace Now movement. In a phone call, a Sicarii member said "we know that Peace Now is funded by Shimon Peres and functions under his direct instructions. We have information on all leftist organizations in Israel. We have the means to get to every single traitor."

== Goals and strategy ==
Sicarii's goal was to send a message to Israeli politicians that there would be opposition to any process of rapprochement with the Palestine Liberation Organization. They were also protesting the exclusion of the Kach Party list in the 1988 Israeli legislative election. A Sicarii caller also said that the groups were planning attacks "to improve the situation of Jews".

They attacked Jewish targets predominantly to draw more attention to their cause as attacks on Arabs would have a smaller effect. Their targets were mostly left-wing politicians, but not exclusively. One of their members claimed that the arson attacks were not meant to kill, but to intimidate, suggesting that some of their attacks may have been designed to fail.

== Police investigation ==
In March 1989, the Israeli Police began an investigation into the Sicarii attacks after the group claimed responsibility for setting fire to the door of Petah Tikva mayor Dov Tavori. This incident motivated president Chaim Herzog to call for the authorities to eradicate the group.

The Israeli police claimed that the group was a "clumsy, loose knit but dangerous band of amateur terrorists". During the early stages of the investigations, some members of the Israeli police said that Sicarii might not be a terrorist group at all, but rather that their actions were isolated extremists' work. They said they felt this way because of the poor execution of all the group's attacks, in contrast with the professionalism of the devices laid by ultra-Orthodox terrorists in the same period.

Immediately after the 1989 Jaffa gate shooting, Chief Superintendent of the national police force Adi Gonen said that "there still is no concrete evidence that the Sicarii exist", and he refused to rule out that the shooting was a criminal rather than a political act. Jerusalem Police Chief Josef Yehudai said that the prime suspect was an "army reservist... with nationalist motives".

In May 1989, the General Security Service arrested 8 Kach party activists over the Sicarii attacks, interrogated them for an hour, and then released them on bail.

=== Arrest and release of a suspect ===
On June 26, 1990, a man was arrested by Israeli police on suspicion that he was the individual behind the series of vandalism incidents on Palestinians and left-wing Israelis claimed by Sicarii, committed since January 1989, and of the killing of an Arab. Police initially suspected him of being the leader of Sicarii.

The case of this suspect attracted a lot of media attention. The man was eventually released on bail on 29 June 1990 after the police failed to find evidence against him. Following his release, he accused newspapers of character assassination, saying, "Whoever did (the Sicarii acts) should be put in jail. But I am innocent. Nothing in the newspapers is right."

== See also ==
- Arab–Israeli conflict
- Jewish religious terrorism
- Kahanism
- Terror Against Terror
