= Mike Guzovsky =

American-Israeli activist

Michael Guzovsky, also known as Michael Guzofsky (Hebrew: מייק גוזובסקי) and Yekutiel Ben-Ya'acov (Hebrew: יקותיאל בן-יעקב), is an American-Israeli follower of Rabbi Meir Kahane. He lives in the settlement of Kfar Tapuach in the West Bank.

Guzovsky was part of Terror Against Terror (TNT), a militant group organized by the Kach Movement. He and several other American immigrants stepped up TNT's violence in 1983 arson, beatings, and on March 4, 1984, shooting a bus of Arab workers near Ramallah, wounding six. Guzovsky was charged with four others, one of whom was to testify for the prosecution but fled. Guzovsky was acquitted while the others were convicted. Guzovsky continued in leadership roles in Kahane Chai (an offshoot of Kach) and was jailed several times in later violence.

The Anti-Defamation League reported that by the mid-1990s, Guzovsky was the leader of Kahane Chai (an offshoot of Kach) in the United States, where he demonstrated against Israeli Prime Minister Yitzhak Rabin, and for Baruch Goldstein, who killed 29 Muslims. When Rabin was assassinated in 1995, Guzovsky stated that "Rabin was bad for Jews" and said of Yigal Amir, that "An intelligent man, one like this law student, had to act."

He has organized peaceful resistance against the dismantlement of settlements.

In 2005, Guzovsky said in the PBS documentary Israel's Next War: "We have thousands of civilians with the military know-how to instigate a mega-attack against Arabs, unidentified people, like Rabin's assassin, Yigal Amir, who can do such a deed. No matter how much the security service and the police harass us, it won't do them any good."

According to the British Government, Guzovsky is a Jewish militant and is on the list of individuals banned from entering the United Kingdom.
