= Amir Siddique =

Sunni Imam

Mawlānā Amir Siddique

Deputy Imam of Lal Masjid
- In office October 2007 – October 2011
- Preceded by: Abdul Aziz Ghazi (as Imam)
- Succeeded by: Vacant
- In office January 2015 – February 2020
- Succeeded by: Vacant

Personal life
- Born: Rajanpur, Punjab, Pakistan
- Occupation: Imam

Religious life
- Religion: Islam
- Denomination: Sunni
- Jurisprudence: Hanfi
- Movement: Deobandi

Mawlānā Amir Siddique (Note: Urdu: عامر صدیق) is a Pakistani Islamic scholar who served as the Deputy Imam of Islamabad's Lal Masjid (Red Mosque) from 2007 to 2011 and again from 2014 to 2020.

== Biography ==
Before his appointment as Deputy Imam in 2007, Siddique served as a khatib at the Pakistan Mineral Development Corporation in Islamabad.

In October 2007, he was appointed Deputy Imam of Lal Masjid, following the Siege of Lal Masjid.

In May 2009, Siddique was named on the List of people banned from entering the United Kingdom. The reason for the ban is that he is "Considered to be engaging in unacceptable behavior by fomenting terrorist violence in furtherance of particular beliefs."

In 2011, he was removed from his post by Mawlānā Abdul Aziz after leading a ten-member delegation to Iran at the invitation of the Iranian Ministry of Foreign Affairs. The visit, which included a trip to the mausoleum of Ruhollah Khomeini, was cited as the reason for his dismissal.

In 2014, he resumed his post after his predecessor, Mawlānā Abdul Aziz, was placed under house arrest and restricted from leading prayers. Siddique, however, disputed this account, stating, "It is not correct that Maulana has been house arrested. He deliberately did not come to the mosque because of the current situation and tension in the city. He wants to normalize the situation and does not want to increase tension in the city.".

In 2015, police registered a case against him under the Amplifier Act for using a loudspeaker for a purpose other than the Islamic call to prayer, which was prohibited in the capital.

In 2016, he was arrested by the Islamabad Police and Rangers in a large-scale operation in Bhara Kahu that netted 54 suspects and a cache of unlicensed weapons. He was subsequently released after producing a valid license for a weapon found in his possession.

In 2020, he was reassigned to the Masjid-e-Shuhada in Aabpara and later to the Jamia Mosque Al-Kawthar in Blue Area of Islamabad.
