= Terror Against Terror =

Jewish militant organization

Terror Against Terror (Hebrew: טרור נגד טרור, "TNT") was a radical Jewish militant organization active in Israel that openly espoused the ideology of perpetrating terrorism and committed several violent attacks directed at Palestinians, ranging from vandalism to mass shooting and murder. The group consisted of many Jewish-American settlers living in Hebron who considered themselves acolytes of Rabbi Meir Kahane, leader of the Kach organization, which had established the group. Kahane had publicly advocated since 1974 that Arab terrorism should be met with Jewish terrorism, hence TNT. The group began committing violent acts against Arabs in 1975. The number of Palestinian victims of TNT attacks is reported to be 23 dead, and 191 injured.

== Militant activity ==
In the summer of 1983 five American immigrants – Mike Guzovsky, Meir Leibowitz, Levi Hazan, Yehuda Richter, and Craig Arthur (Aviel) Leitner – decided to step up the violence of TNT, particularly in the wake of the Camp David Accords and treaty. The five had known each other from the New York JDL and were with Kach; Leitner in particular was evading possible prosecution for violence in the U.S., while Richter was part of the TNT's suicide cell at Yamit. They began by burning vehicles and the office of the Al-Fajr Jerusalem newspaper, threw Molotov cocktails at homes, and beat several residents. On the morning of March 4, 1984, the group opened fire with Guzovsky's father's M16 on a bus full of Arab workers near Mazra'a e-Sharqiya, leaving six wounded. They claimed responsibility by phone under the name of "the Shelomo Ben-Yosef Brigade of TNT".

Shin Bet were already monitoring the group, and by March 6 they arrested seven suspects in relation to the shooting and the other recent attacks by Guzovsky's group. Charges were filed again Guzovsky, Leibowitz, Hazan, and Richter, with lesser charges against Leitner, the car driver, who was to testify against the others but instead fled to his home in New York. Hazan, Leibowitz, and Richter were convicted while Guzovsky was acquitted. Leitner was extradited in 1986 and served the remainder of a 30-month sentence. Richter and Guzovsky continued in leadership roles of Kahane Chai, and would be jailed for future violent activism.

On March 27, 1984, Israeli police arrested four youths from the Ein Kerem neighborhood in West Jerusalem for 14 hand-grenade attacks against Christian and Muslim holy sites. The attacks took place over a series of months in Jerusalem and Palestinian Territories and been claimed by "Terror Against Terror". Three of the suspects, Uri Ben-Ayun, David Deri and his cousin Amram Deri, were convicted and given six-year sentences with a three-year suspended sentence.

== Reception ==
General Yehoshafat Harkabi described them as:

serious people who occupy high positions among their public...they have a rational state of mind and their chief motivation stems apparently from the awareness that annexation of the West Bank together with its Arab population would be disastrous and tantamount to national suicide - unless that population were thinned out and made to flee by terrorism. This reasoning is not moral, but it stems from the rational conclusion of the policy that aims at annexation. Such terrorism is neither a 'punishment' nor a deterrent; it is a political instrument.

== See also ==
- Sicarii (1989)

== Sources ==
- "Holy Terror". Time. 19 March 1984. Archived from the original on 2007-02-24.
