= Israel's Next War =

- Directed by: Dan Setton
- Written by: Dan Setton; Abat Tal-Shir; Tzadok Yecheskeli
- Produced by: Dan Setton
- Starring: Shlomo Dvir; Yarden Morag; Will Lyman (narrator)
- Cinematography: Gil Mesuman
- Edited by: Tali Halter-Shenkar
- Music by: Dani Reichental
- Distributed by: Spiegel TV, Germany
- Release date: 5 April 2005
- Running time: 55" (US); 2 x 52" (ISR)
- Countries: Israel; United States
- Languages: English, Hebrew

"Israel's Next War" is an episode of the PBS series Frontline that aired on 5 April 2005. The episode, by Israeli director Dan Setton, investigated the rise of the religious right in Israel and the role it could play as a "spoiler" in peace negotiations with the Palestinians. It was Setton's second documentary film for PBS: his previous film for them, "Shattered Dreams of Peace," won him a Peabody Award.

== The film ==
Setton explains that the inspiration for his project came from his previous film, In the Name of God (HBO), an investigation of fundamentalist Islam and suicide bombers, for which he received an Emmy Award. Having investigated radical religion in Pakistan, Afghanistan, and South Lebanon, Setton decided to take his investigation closer to home and investigate how right-wing religious fundamentalism was impacting Orthodox Jews in Israel. The phenomenon of the radical right had already made an enormous impact on Israeli society following the Cave of the Patriarchs massacre in 1994 by Baruch Goldstein, and the assassination of prime minister Yitzhak Rabin by Yigal Amir the following year. Two groups associated with these events, Kach and Kahane Chai, were declared terrorist organizations by the Israeli and U.S. governments, respectively. While Setton found that the activist core of these groups was small, some 30 percent of Israelis identified with their ideology of establishing an exclusively Jewish state. To better understand the phenomenon, he decided to investigate a lesser-known incident that had failed - a plot to bomb a Palestinian girls' school in the East Jerusalem neighborhood of At-Tur.

During the film, Setton interviews the two perpetrators, Shlomo Dvir and Yarden Morag, in prison, and visits the settlement of Bat Ayin, where they lived. Dvir admits to the camera that it was his idea, saying, "Whoever gets hurt gets hurt." These interviews serve as a hook, leading Setton to various other settlers, who supported Dvir and Morag. Some are very explicit about the motivations for the attack: "Revenge", says Noam Federman, "is an important value. The Talmud says that it is one of the greatest things. Revenge is great." He believes that revenge is the motive for people like Yitzhak Paz, formerly of the Jewish settlement in Hebron, whose 10-month-old daughter Shalhevet was killed by a sniper, while he and his wife were walking with her in the street. Paz's arrest for the possession of explosives helped the police to unravel the case against Dvir and Morag.

As the film unfolds, however, Setton discovers that the extremists' motives extend far beyond acts of personal revenge against the Palestinians. Shmuel Ben Yishai, a follower of Meir Kahane now living in the settlement of Kiryat Arba, is no less antagonistic toward the State of Israel in its current configuration: "The Israeli secular entity has to be destroyed," he says. "God can't reveal himself until it's all wiped out. As long as the state of Israel stays as it is, there will be no redemption." An Israeli editorial on the series noted that "Words like 'redemption,' 'sanctify', and 'revenge' marble the vocabulary of these people." On the other hand, the extremists believe that this will one day change. Mike Guzovsky says: "I think the day will come when the Secret Service and the government will look for Jews who are willing to go into the Arab villages and kick them out, kill them …"

During the film, Setton also speaks with the Israeli authorities under whose tenure the events occurred. Avi Dichter, head of the Shin Bet at the time, tells him that, " Jewish terror is liable to create a serious strategic threat that will turn the Israeli-Palestinian conflict into a conflict between 13 million Jews and a billion Muslims all over the world." Yitzhak Dar, the head of the Jewish section of the Shin Bet, draws a distinction between believers and activists: "As long as they're only thinking it, as long as they're only talking about it, we can live with it. When they try to put it into action, through the murder of the prime minister, through the murder of Arabs, through the massacre at the Hebron mosque, it's the beginning of the end of a nation that can defend itself."

== Israeli response to the film ==
On October 20, 2005, five months after the documentary screened on PBS, an extended version of it was shown on Israel's Channel 2. Although Israelis had long been aware of the extremist activities of its fundamentalists, the overwhelming response was one of horror to hear their underlying ideology articulated. The national newspaper Haaretz titled its review of the film "A Horror Film", but quickly attempted to insinuate that the phenomenon was not indigenous to Israel, and had been imported there largely by American Jewish immigrants. The lede paragraph of the article notes of the extremists that, "They are 'serious to death', as they say in English, the mother tongue of no small part of them ...".

Setton, however, disagreed with this analysis, and attempted to argue that the ideology, if not the actions, are prevalent among large segment of Israeli society. He admits that there are no confirmed numbers of people who adhere to that ideology, though in an interview with PBS, he estimates that it is about 30 percent of the country's Jewish population. After quoting Shmuel Ben Yishai saying that there is no religious justification for leaving any Palestinian in a Jewish state, Setton comments, "To some people, this is extreme, but others who are more centrist and more religious do not see anything wrong with what he is saying. They see a brave man who is expressing what he feels. It all depends on where your political compass lies."

Nevertheless, Setton does see a difference between these extremists and the Islamic fundamentalists, who were the subject of his previous film "In the Name of God". He explains, "They have something unique to them - the adoration of death as a value. With us, it is something internal that does not come from the same motives, but from other causes. There is no room for comparison, except in their religious beliefs."
