= Yau Ma Tei boat people =

Cultural group in Kowloon, Hong Kong

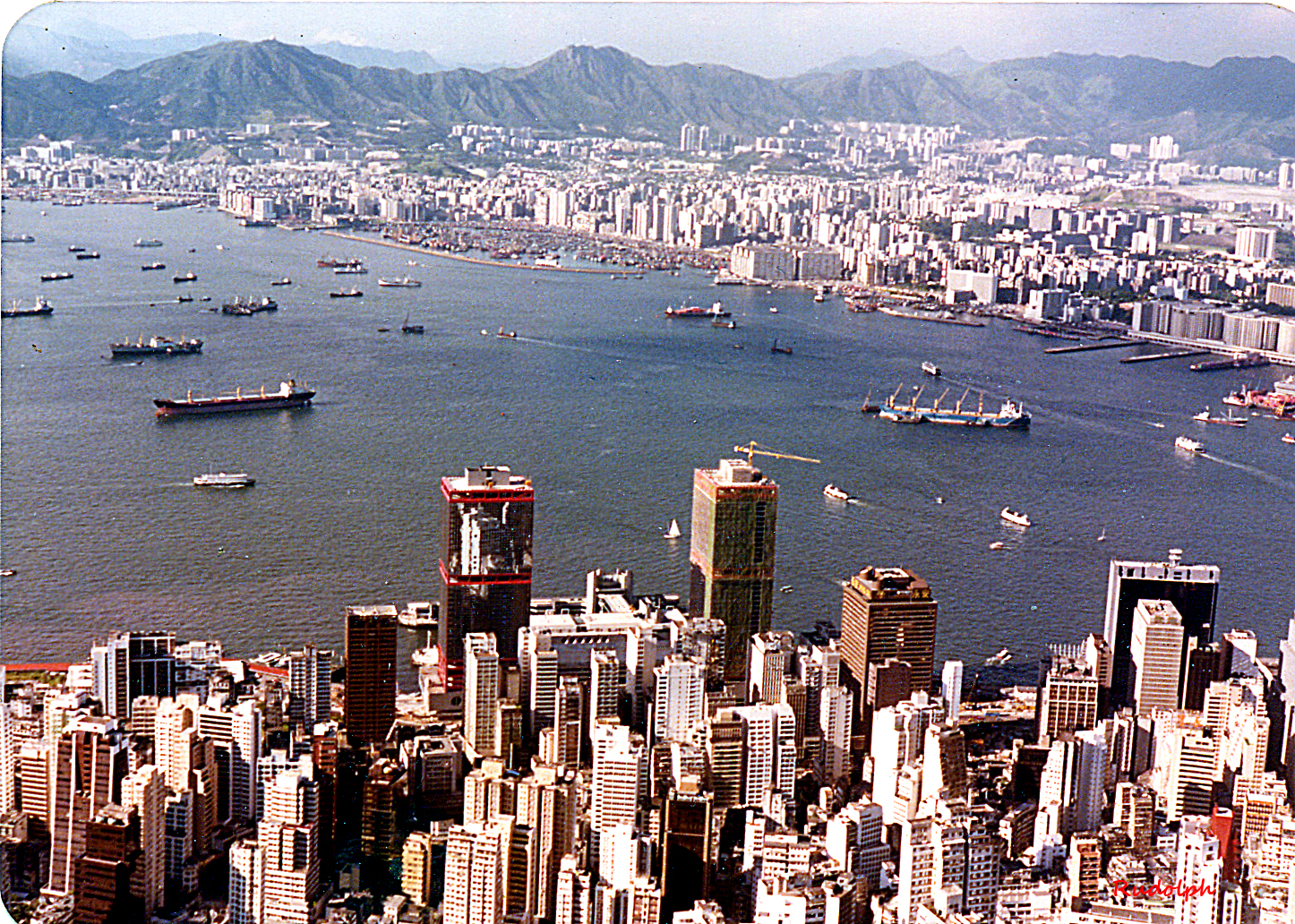
Former Yau Ma Tei typhoon shelter (background) pictured in 1985.

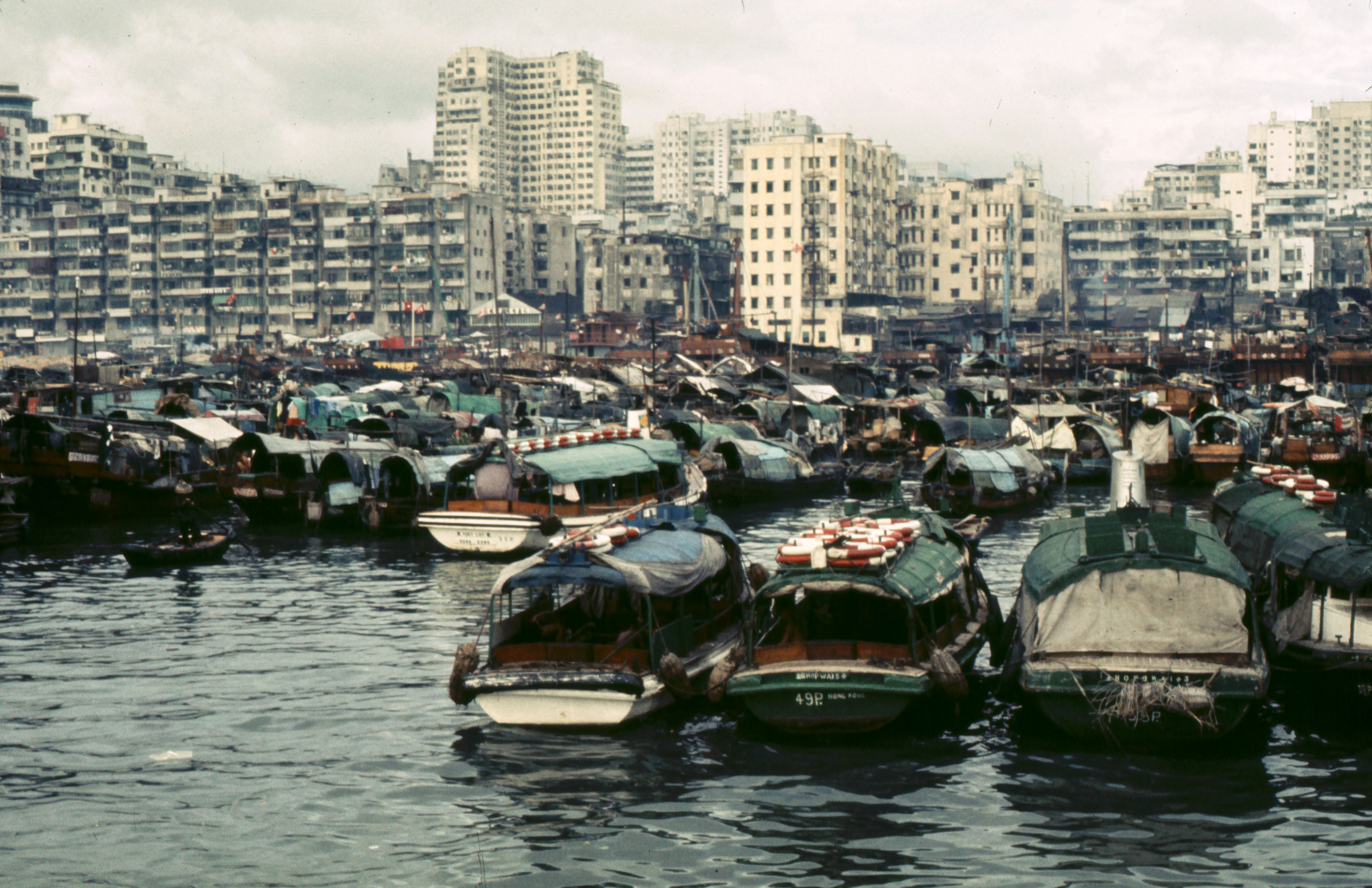
Former Yau Ma Tei typhoon shelter in the 1970s

Yau Ma Tei boat people refers to those who lived in the Yau Ma Tei Typhoon Shelter, Kowloon, Hong Kong from around 1916 to 1990. Yau Ma Tei boat people mainly consisted of Boat Dwellers. In the 1980s many families moved to public housing on land under a special Housing Authority scheme. The original typhoon shelter was filled in under the Airport Core Programme in the 1990s.

== Background ==
There are many different typhoon shelters in Hong Kong. The Yau Ma Tei Typhoon Shelter was established in 1915 after a serious typhoon that hit on 18 September 1906. Around 3,000 fish boats sank because of the typhoon, prompting the Hong Kong Government to build a typhoon shelter for those boat people who relied on fishery in Yau Ma Tei to make a living.

Yau Ma Tei boat people changed their careers from fishery to entertainment and catering services in the 1950s. With the Government promoting typhoon shelters as a tourist spot, the Yau Ma Tei Typhoon Shelter earned the reputation of "Boat Shanghai Street", signifying the flourishing prospect of it as a leisure spot. The typhoon shelter was popular with its featured cuisine and performance, and was conveniently located immediately west of Mong Kok. It attracted not only local people, but also tourists. It was the golden period of the Yau Ma Tei shelter. Yet, there were news reports that suggested that the typhoon shelter jeopardised social order as crimes like gambling, prostitution, and opium trade was reportedly common.

== Cultural practices ==
=== Religion ===
The boat people's livelihood was closely related to nature. As fishery depends on the weather, they seek divine blessings for their safety.

Tin Hau Festival: On the 23rd day of the third lunar month, hundreds of boat people sailed towards Tin Hau temples, where they pay homages to the Goddess Tin Hau, with offerings. The festival is to celebrate the Goddess's birthday and to pray for the spiritual protection and blessings, such as good weather and abundant harvest. Apart from Tin Hau, they also worship and honour other deities, such as Hung Shing and Tam Kung, for their safety and blessings.

=== Marriage customs ===
Yau Ma Tei boat people possessed unique marriage traditions. Different groups of boat people had different marriage cultures. For example, “Yanggang Ren” threw vegetables to the other during “Guodali”, the traditional Chinese betrothal ceremony. They had a special culture of "Guodali" including rituals such as giving a pair of shoes to the little brother and giving two chickens to the bigger brother.

There were ships that were specifically for wedding purpose. The wedding parties lasted three days and nights. Some of the couples could just rent the ships for wedding parties. Lastly, people not only inter-married within the same shelter, but also married with boat people from other shelters.

=== Taboos ===
Yau Ma Tei boat people possessed several taboos in their daily lives. They did not turn over food, especially fish, because the meaning of "turning food" was the sinking of boats. They also avoided using certain words, such as chen, which also means "sinking" in Chinese.

=== Clothing and diet ===
Boat people usually wore Tang suit. Since they seldom went on shore, they did not buy clothes on land, but made their clothing by themselves instead.

Boat people traditionally fished for a living, that part of their catch which could fetch a good price was sold at market, with less prized fish was eaten by themselves. Fish surplus to what could be consumed or sold was salted. They also reared chickens on the boat as the main source of meat. Vegetables were bought from the water market, while water was bought from the "water boat". Some boat people responsible for buying fresh water and vegetable on land and transferred them to the water market for further selling.

== Daily life ==
=== Education ===
In 1949, the Oriental Horizon Christian Church established "Proclaiming (Buguang) Christian Boat" in the shelter. It aimed at preaching religion through providing education. However, the quotas were strictly limited for those children, which were around 30 quotas. Since the boat people treated female as inferior to male, boys had more opportunities to get education under the limited quotas. Thus, education was not significant in the Yau Ma Tei shelter. After the boat people moved to public housing, their children mainly went to fishermen's children schools.

=== Medical needs ===
There was no well-constructed medical system in Yau Ma Tei Shelter. Some religious groups had provided limited medical services at the shelter. Besides, there were some unlicensed doctors and "Wenmi Po" in the shelter. "Wenmi Po" would provide some "holly papers" to the patients to cure them. If boat people suffered from serious illnesses, they had to go to hospitals on land.

=== Living environment ===
The boats that boat people lived including kitchen, toilet, sleeping and studying areas. Wealthier boat people could divide their boats into more sections, such as bedroom and living room, while the poorer ones could not. Wastes from the boats were disposed to the sea.

Boats were tied together in the shelter for stability which posed a significant fire hazard. If there was a fire incident on a boat, other boats would be engulfed. The Yau Ma Tei boat people also faced threats from typhoons and poor hygiene conditions. With compact living space in the boats and lacking sense of cleanness, boat people might easily get ill.

As most of the boat people work on land, it was difficult for parents to take care of their children. Children became more likely to be involved in different accidents, like drowning. Thus, many parents tied up their children aiming at finding the dead bodies easily once the children drowned.

=== Possible discrimination ===
Boat people were regarded as competitors in job market by land dwellers, which could lead to discrimination. Yau Ma Tei boat people had their own accents, which were different with people on land. For example, the word feet in Cantonese was pronounced as "goek"(腳), but boat people pronounced it as "gok"(角). Because of different accents, they might be discriminated when finding jobs on land. Land dwellers could also identify the boat people by their appearances and names, such as Tai(娣), Kim(金), Mui(妹) etc.

== The protest of Yau Ma Tei boat people in the 1970s ==
=== Social context ===
There were many problems that came with the prosperity of the "Boat Shanghai Street", which forced the Government to take action and clamp down on it. The rise of the catering industry on land led to a decline of "Boat Shanghai Street" while a rapid development of the secondary industries attracted Yau Mei Tei boat people to become porters and engage in industries on land.

As the boat people tended to dispose of their waste to the sea, the offshore water quality was contaminated. Besides, long-term fishing on the coastal area caused a sharp decline in the amount of fish. This forced them to sail farther away from the coast for fishing. However, the lack of capital and machinery hindered their businesses, and thus, they needed to work on land.

Boats no longer served a working purpose but were increasingly just used for residential purposes. Yau Ma Tei boat people worked on land in the daytime and returned home to their boats at night. The boats coming to be called their "Home Boat". At the end of the 1970s, the number of "Home boats" grew to 2000, which worsened the living environment of the typhoon shelter.

The crowded home-boats led to a poor living environment in the shelter. However, the government had never carried out a tenancy registration for them, which made them difficult to resettle on land. They were only assigned a new home on land if their boats sank by accident.

The Yau Ma Tei boat people were usually assigned to New Territories as frontiersmen under the policies of new town development. They refused to follow this policy because they preferred to settle near Kowloon for easier access to work.

=== Process of the protest ===
Before the predicament of Yau Ma Tei boat people had caught media's attention, Father Franco Mella was the first to get in touch with them. Father Mella helped them in various aspects, especially education. He referred cases to volunteers or social workers, bringing more and more NGOs, such as the Society of Community Organization and Kwun Tong Inquiry Service, into the issue.

The social workers told the boat people about their citizen's rights. Because of the low education level, boat people in Yau Ma Tei seldom knew their social welfare and citizen rights. With the affiliation of social workers and social activists, Yau Ma Tei boat people started to plan a protest and negotiate with government officials.

On 7 January 1979, social workers and Yau Ma Tei boat people proposed a protest next to the Government House. 76 boat dwellers and their supporters boarded two buses with the intention to hand a petition to Governor MacLehose unannounced. However, when their buses were approaching the Eastern Harbour Crossing, they were stopped by the police and got arrested. All 76 people were released. 11 supporters, made up of volunteers and social workers, were charged as against the Public Order Ordinance.

=== Consequences ===
This was the most significant conflict that marked the boat people who fought for their rights. In 1982, the Hong Kong government changed the requirements of applying public housing for the boat people. Those who resided in Hong Kong for 10 years were eligible to apply for the public housing under the new policy. The requirement was 5 years shorter comparing with the old policy. Also, if their boats were deemed as dangerous, they could apply for the public housing. This new regulation improved the living environment of the boat people and changed the unfair situation.

More widely, the episode aroused concern amongst the Hong Kong public and internationally. In particular, the arrests shone a light on the Public Order Ordinance and the arrests were included alongside other case studies that purportedly showcased human rights violations within the colony. In Hong Kong, people began to question if the definition of assembly was too general. The Public Ordinance was subsequently amended in 1980 because of concern. After the amendment, notification to police was sufficient before the assembly, instead of applying for a license. Meanwhile, the quorum of applying for a protest license changed from 10 to 20.

== See also ==
- Aberdeen floating village
- Ordinary Heroes, a 1999 historical film directed by Ann Hui
