= Yunis Al Astal =

Palestinian politician and preacher (born 1956)

Member of the Palestinian Legislative Council
- Incumbent
- Assumed office 18 February 2006
- Constituency: Khan Yunis Governorate

Personal details
- Born: 1956 (age 69–70) Khan Yunis, All-Palestine Protectorate
- Party: Hamas
- Education: University of Jordan
- Occupation: Politician, preacher

Military service
- Allegiance: Al-Qassam Brigades

Yunis Al Astal (Arabic: يونس الأسطل; born 1956) is a Palestinian politician, Islamic preacher and Hamas member of the Palestinian Legislative Council for the Khan Yunis Governorate. He writes on topics such as Islamic law (fiqh), sociology and politics.

== Early life and education ==
Born in Khan Yunis, Palestine, in 1956, he obtained his master's and doctorate degrees from the Faculty of Sharia at the University of Jordan in Amman.

== Conferences ==
He participated in several jurisprudential conferences, most notably:

- The Conference on Jurisprudential Developments in Islamic Banking Transactions, held at the University of Jordan in 1994
- The Conference on Teaching Islamic Sciences in Universities between Reality and Aspiration, held under the auspices of the International Institute of Islamic Thought

== Career ==
He worked as a lecturer at the Islamic University of Gaza, then as dean of the Faculty of Sharia, then as head of the university's Fatwa Committee. He is a regular columnist in Al-Risala newspaper published by the Hamas movement in Gaza. He also serves as a Treasurer of the Zakat al-Rahma Committee in Khan Younis.

Al Astal is the founder and head of Al-Huda Islamic Model Schools and head of the Adalah Arbitration Foundation in Khan Younis. He also participates in the programs on Al-Aqsa TV.

== Allegiance ==
In 2006, he was identified as a member of the Al-Qassam Brigades by the Konrad Adenauer Foundation.

== Controversial comments ==
On the occasion of Pope Benedict XVI's visit to Jordan and Israel, he stated that Arab governments welcoming the Pope harmed the Prophet Muhammad more than the pontiff's allegedly controversial remarks about the founder of Islam.

In 2009, Al Astal came under controversy for denying the Holocaust, criticizing the UN Reliefs and Works Agency for planning to teach about the genocide in Gaza's school curriculum. Al Astal said that adding the Holocaust would amount to “marketing a lie and spreading it..." and claimed teaching the subject to Palestinian children was a "war crime, because of how it serves the Zionist colonizers and deals with their hypocrisy and lies..."

The Middle East Media Research Institute (MEMRI) translated his sermon and posted the video for paid subscribers on the Internet.

In an interview with Al-Aqsa TV on May 11, 2011 which was translated by MEMRI TV he said:

"The [Jews] are brought in droves to Palestine so that the Palestinians – and the Islamic nation behind them – will have the honor of annihilating the evil of this gang."

"…All the predators, all the birds of prey, all the dangerous reptiles and insects, and all the lethal bacteria are far less dangerous than the Jews."

"…In just a few years, all the Zionists and the settlers will realize that their arrival in Palestine was for the purpose of the great massacre, by means of which Allah wants to relieve humanity of their evil."

"…When Palestine is liberated and its people return to it, and the entire region, with the grace of Allah, will have turned into the United States of Islam, the land of Palestine will become the capital of the Islamic Caliphate, and all these countries will turn into states within the Caliphate."

== Banned from the United Kingdom ==
He was named on the list of individuals banned from entering the United Kingdom for "... engaging in unacceptable behaviour by seeking to foment, justify or glorify terrorist violence in furtherance of particular beliefs and to provoke others to terrorist acts".
