= Wagdy Abd el-Hamied Mohamed Ghoneim =

Egyptian imam (born 1951)

Wagdy Abd El Hamied Mohamed Ghoneim^{[A]} (Arabic: وجدي عبد الحميد محمد غنيم), normally shortened to Wagdy Ghoneim (born 8 February 1951) is an Egyptian Muslim imam and writer. He was imam at the Islamic Institute of Orange County, California, in the United States, until 2005. He was a fundraiser for the Toledo, Ohio based Hamas charity KindHearts.

In January 2005, Ghoneim left the US for Qatar, following his arrest for violating his immigration status. Bail was refused over concerns that his previous speeches and fundraising might have supported organisations such as Hamas. He was given a ten-year ban on re-entry to the country.

In May 2009, he was placed on the British Home Office's list of "Individuals banned from the UK for stirring up hatred" for being "considered to be engaging in unacceptable behaviour by seeking to foment, justify or glory terrorist violence in furtherance of particular beliefs and to provoke others to commit terrorist acts."

== Controversies ==
He said, prior to 30 June 2013 major protests, that whoever protests against the president Mohamed Morsi is a Kafir. Ghoneim denounced Abdel Fattah el-Sisi's coup d'état after Morsi was toppled.

The amputation of limbs for stealing is supported by Ghoneim.

In April 2017, he justified attacks on Coptic churches, due to their support to President Abdel Fattah el-Sisi.

On 26 July 2019, he was banned from entering Tunisia because of hateful declarations against the former president Beji Caid Essebsi. Ghoneim stated that Tunisia is against Islam and its president is against the Quran and Sunnah.

In April 2021, he criticized the Pharaohs' Golden Parade, calling the ancient Egyptians as infidels.

== Notes ==
^[A]: His name in Arabic text: وجدى عبد الحميد محمد غنيم; in IPA [ˈwæɡdi ʕæbdel.ħæˈmiːd mæˈħæmmæd ɣoˈneːm]; the initial name maybe transcribed as Wagdi, the middle name may also be transcribed as Abdelhamid / Abdel Hamid / Abd El Hamid. See Abdel.
