= List of people deported or removed from the United States =

The following is an incomplete list of notable people who have been deported from the United States. The U.S. Department of Justice (DOJ), particularly the U.S. Department of Homeland Security (DHS) and the Executive Office for Immigration Review (EOIR), handles all matters of deportation. Their decisions may be appealed and reviewed by federal judges.

In several cases (i.e., Charlie Chaplin, Adam Habib and Conrad Gallagher), the orders of deportation and/or exclusion were later lifted. Among many changes in terminology, "removal" superseded "deportation" in 1996 following the enactment of Illegal Immigration Reform and Immigrant Responsibility Act (IIRIRA).

Aside from the Alien and Sedition Acts of 1798, there was no applicable deportation law in the United States until an 1882 statute specifically geared towards Chinese immigrants. The Alien and Sedition Acts gave the President of the United States the power to arrest and subsequently deport any alien that he deemed dangerous. The 1882 Chinese Exclusion Act was designed to suspend Chinese immigration to the United States, and deport Chinese residents that were termed as illegally residing in the country. The types of individuals that could be deported from the United States was later reclassified to include those who were insane or carrying a disease, convicts, prostitutes, those entering the United States over the immigration quotas, anarchists, and those that belonged to organizations which supported the overthrow of the United States government by use of violence.

Legislation enacted by the U.S. Congress in 1891 gave a time limit of one year after an alien entered the country for the individual to be deported and decreased judicial review of deportation proceedings. The office of superintendent of immigration in the Department of the Treasury was also created with the 1891 enactment, and this responsibility later passed to the Immigration and Naturalization Service (INS). During the Red Scare in 1919, a number of persons were deported under suspicion of illegal activity. The statute of limitations on deportation from the United States was removed under the Immigration and Nationality Act of 1952. Deportation laws were cited during the 1950s in order to remove union leaders and alleged members of the Communist party said to be illegally in the country. According to Funk & Wagnalls New World Encyclopedia, about 23,000 aliens were deported annually from the country during the latter period of the 1980s.

If an alien is deemed by the government to be removable, they will receive a "notice to appear" (NTA) and later face an immigration judge, who will decide whether or not the alien is removable from the United States. Either party (the alien or the government prosecutor) may appeal (by legal brief, not in person) an immigration judge's decision to the Board of Immigration Appeals (BIA). If an alien fails to appear for any immigration hearing, such person is usually ordered removed in absentia. Those individuals who illegally entered the United States constitute the single largest portion of people deported from the country. Once deported or removed, an alien is not allowed to legally reenter the country unless given special permission to do so by either the DHS or the EOIR. The DHS has placed 164,000 criminals in removal proceedings in 2007, and estimated that figure would be 200,000 for 2008.

In 2001, approximately 73,000 illegal aliens with criminal convictions were deported from the United States, and in 2007 this figure was 91,000. In 2011, the DHS deported 396,906 people. Of those deported, 54.6% were criminal offenders.

== List ==
Individual	Occupation	Citizen of	Year deported	Deported to	Reasons for deportation	Ref.
Andrija Artuković	Lawyer, politician, revolutionary	Independent State of Croatia	1986	Yugoslavia	World War II war criminal, co-founder and leader of the fascist, ultranationalist and terrorist organization Ustase, died in 1988	
Trevor Berbick	Jamaican heavyweight boxer	Jamaica	1997, 2002	Jamaica	Rape and sexual assault convictions, and parole violations	
Theodorus van Berkel	Machinist	Netherlands	1939	Netherlands	Rape and sexual assault convictions, escaping from prison.	
Conrad Black, Lord Black of Crossharbour	Publisher, businessman	Canada; United Kingdom	2012	Canada	Mail fraud and obstruction of justice convictions	
Griselda Blanco	Drug lord for the Medellín Cartel, involved in the Miami-based cocaine drug trade during the 1970s and early 1980s	Colombia	2004	Colombia	Various and multiple criminal convictions	
Charles Hopel Brown	Jamaican author, computer engineer, and U.S. Army veteran	Jamaica	2004	Jamaica	Resisting arrest, probation violations	
Hermine Braunsteiner	Female Nazi concentration camp guard	/Germany; United States	1973	West Germany	First Nazi to be deported from the United States; denaturalized and extradited at West German government's request	
Joe Cahill	Prominent Irish republican and former Chief of Staff of the Provisional Irish Republican Army	Ireland	1984	Ireland	Illegal entry	
Charlie Chaplin	British actor and director	United Kingdom; England	1952	United Kingdom; England	Denied a re-entry permit to the U.S. after a trip abroad, reportedly instigated by J. Edgar Hoover; returned briefly to the U.S. in 1972	
Anna Chapman	Soviet-born Russian national	Russia; United Kingdom (later revoked)	2010	Russia	Illegals Program spy ring under the Russian Federation's SVR; also stripped of UK citizenship soon after U.S. deportation	
Julio César Chávez Jr.	Mexican professional boxer	Mexico	2025	Mexico	Alleged ties to the Sinaloa Cartel	
John Demjanjuk	Guard at Nazi German extermination camps	Soviet Union; United States; Ukraine	2009	Israel (First deportation); Germany (Second deportation)	Alleged Nazi war criminal, denaturalized in 2002, and finally deported in 2009 to Germany from Israel, which had filed war crimes charges	
Joe Doherty	Provisional Irish Republican Army volunteer	Ireland	1992	Ireland	Involvement with Provisional Irish Republican Army	
Hanns Eisler	Composer	Austria; Germany	1948	Austria	Alleged communist ties, victim of McCarthyism	
Raffaello Follieri	Real estate developer, socialite	Italy	2012	Italy	Legal misappropriation of funds related to the "Vati-Con scandal"	
Johanna Gadski	Operatic soprano singer	Prussia	1918	Germany	Declared an enemy alien by the Wilson administration and deported from the United States during World War I	
Conrad Gallagher	Irish chef and restaurateur	Ireland	2002	Ireland	Financial convictions in the United States and Ireland	
Marcus Garvey	Founder of Universal Negro Improvement Association	Jamaica	1927	Jamaica	Fraud conviction related to sale of stock in one of his businesses	
Peter Gatien	Businessman and New York nightclub owner	Canada	2003	Canada	Tax-evasion convictions	
Emma Goldman	Anarchist and political activist	Russia; United States	1919	Soviet Union		
Adam Habib	Scholar	South Africa	2006	South Africa	Apprehended and deported over allegations of "engaging in terrorist activities", ban lifted in 2010	
Tony Halme	Politician, professional wrestler, and actor	Finland	1999	Finland	Possession of an illegal firearm and smuggling illegal substances	
C. L. R. James	Journalist, social theorist	Trinidad and Tobago	1953	Trinidad and Tobago	Alleged Communist ties	
Claudia Jones	Black Nationalist and political activist	Trinidad and Tobago	1955	United Kingdom	Deported under the Immigration and Nationality Act of 1952 for being a Communist, granted asylum in the United Kingdom	
Konrāds Kalējs	Latvian soldier	Latvia	1994	Australia	Alleged Nazi collaborator and war criminal during World War II, moved to Canada but was deported from Canada back to Australia in 1997	
Herman W. Lang	Nazi German spy	Germany	1950	West Germany	Espionage-related convictions	
Karl Linnas	Chief of Tartu Nazi concentration camp	Estonia	1987	Soviet Union	Nazi war criminal	
Lucky Luciano	Organized crime boss	Italy; United States	1946	Italy	Pandering, operating a massive prostitution ring	
Peter Lundin	Serial killer	Denmark	1999	Denmark	First-degree murder-related charges, one of whom was his mother	
Tim Maia	Soul singer	Brazil	1963	Brazil	Marijuana possession charges	
Mousa Mohammed Abu Marzook	Hamas leader	Jordan	1997	Jordan	Involvement with Hamas	
Charles Mowbray	Anarcho-communists, trade unionist	United Kingdom	1901	United Kingdom		
Oliver O'Grady	Former Roman Catholic priest	Ireland	2001	Ireland	Rape, molestation and abuse of children convictions in California	
Vicky Peláez	Spy	Peru	2010	Russia	Worked as an unregistered foreign agent for Russia, agreed to deportation in exchange for the U.S. government dropping the more serious charge of money laundering	
Charles Ponzi	Fraudster	Italy	1934	Italy	Fraud charges, created the Ponzi scheme	
Bhagwan Shree Rajneesh	Public speaker, godman, mystic	India	1985	India	Immigration violations	
Rosaura Revueltas	Stage and film actress	Mexico	1954	Mexico	Illegal entrance, deported during filming of Salt of the Earth	
Alphonso Sgroia	Neapolitan Camorra gangster, hitman	Italy		Italy	Numerous murder convictions	
Heinz Spanknöbel	Pro-Nazi Friends of New Germany activist, spy	Germany	1933	Germany	Failure to register as a foreign agent	
Mollie Steimer	Anarchy activist	Russia	1921	Russian SFSR	Unknown	
Tsien Hsue-shen	Scientist, aerospace engineer	China	1955	China	Accused of being a communist sympathizer	
John Turner	anarchist communist shop steward	United Kingdom; England	1903	United Kingdom; England	First person deported from the United States for violating the 1903 Anarchist Exclusion Act	
Ernst Zündel	German neo-Nazi and Holocaust denier	Germany	2005	Germany	Deported subsequently from Canada	
Omar Artan	Somali football referee	Somalia	2026	Turkey	Denied entry to the 2026 FIFA World Cup and subsequently deported to Istanbul.	

== See also ==
- Illegal immigration to the United States
- List of denaturalized former citizens of the United States
- U.S. Immigration and Customs Enforcement
- List of people barred or excluded from the United States
