= Peter Chingoka =

Zimbabwean cricket administrator (1954–2019)

Personal information
- Full name: Peter Chingoka
- Born: 2 March 1954; Bulawayo, Southern Rhodesia, Rhodesia and Nyasaland (now Zimbabwe)
- Died: 22 August 2019 (aged 65)
- Batting: Right-handed
- Bowling: Right-arm medium

Domestic team information
- Years: Team
- 1975/76–1976/77: South Africa African XI

Career statistics
Competition	List A
Matches	2
Runs scored	15
Batting average	7.50
100s/50s	–/–
Top score	13
Balls bowled	126
Wickets	1
Bowling average	142.00
5 wickets in innings	–
10 wickets in match	–
Best bowling	1/83
Catches/stumpings	–/–
- Source: ESPNcricinfo, 20 October 2012

Peter Chingoka (2 March 1954 – 22 August 2019) was a Zimbabwean cricket administrator.

== Career ==
His father, Douglas, was a sub-inspector in the Rhodesian police force—the British South Africa Police—and later a deputy commissioner in the Zimbabwe Republic Police from 1980. He was senior of Peter Godwin in the school.

As an all-rounder in 1970s Rhodesia, Chingoka was the first Black Rhodesian cricketer to play at a high level, appearing in List A games for the South Africa African XI, which he captained in two matches in the Gillette Cup competition in 1975-76 and 1976-77. His team lost both matches by large margins.

After a time in club cricket, Chingoka moved into administration, and in 1990, became Vice-President of the Zimbabwe Cricket Union (since renamed Zimbabwe Cricket); he was promoted to the position of President two years later. As such, he became a full voting member of the executive board of the International Cricket Council (ICC). He was elected chairman of the African Cricket Association (ACA) in 1998.

In October 2007, Chingoka, who was due to give evidence in Darrell Hair's employment tribunal/racism controversy, was refused entry to Britain. In February 2008, the-then UK Culture Secretary (and future Prime Minister) Andy Burnham refused to guarantee that Chingoka would be allowed entry to attend a London meeting of the ICC until a publication of a report by accountants KPMG on alleged corruption in Zimbabwean cricket.

He was added to the European Union's list of Zimbabweans subject to personal sanctions—a ban on travel to the EU and the freezing of any assets there—in July 2008, following the controversial 2008 presidential election, in which President Robert Mugabe was re-elected amidst serious political violence. Later, in December 2008, he was banned from travelling to Australia.

He resigned as the chairman of Zimbabwe Cricket on 23 July 2014.

== Death ==
Chingoka died in August 2019.
