= Franco Mella =

Italian Roman Catholic priest and activist

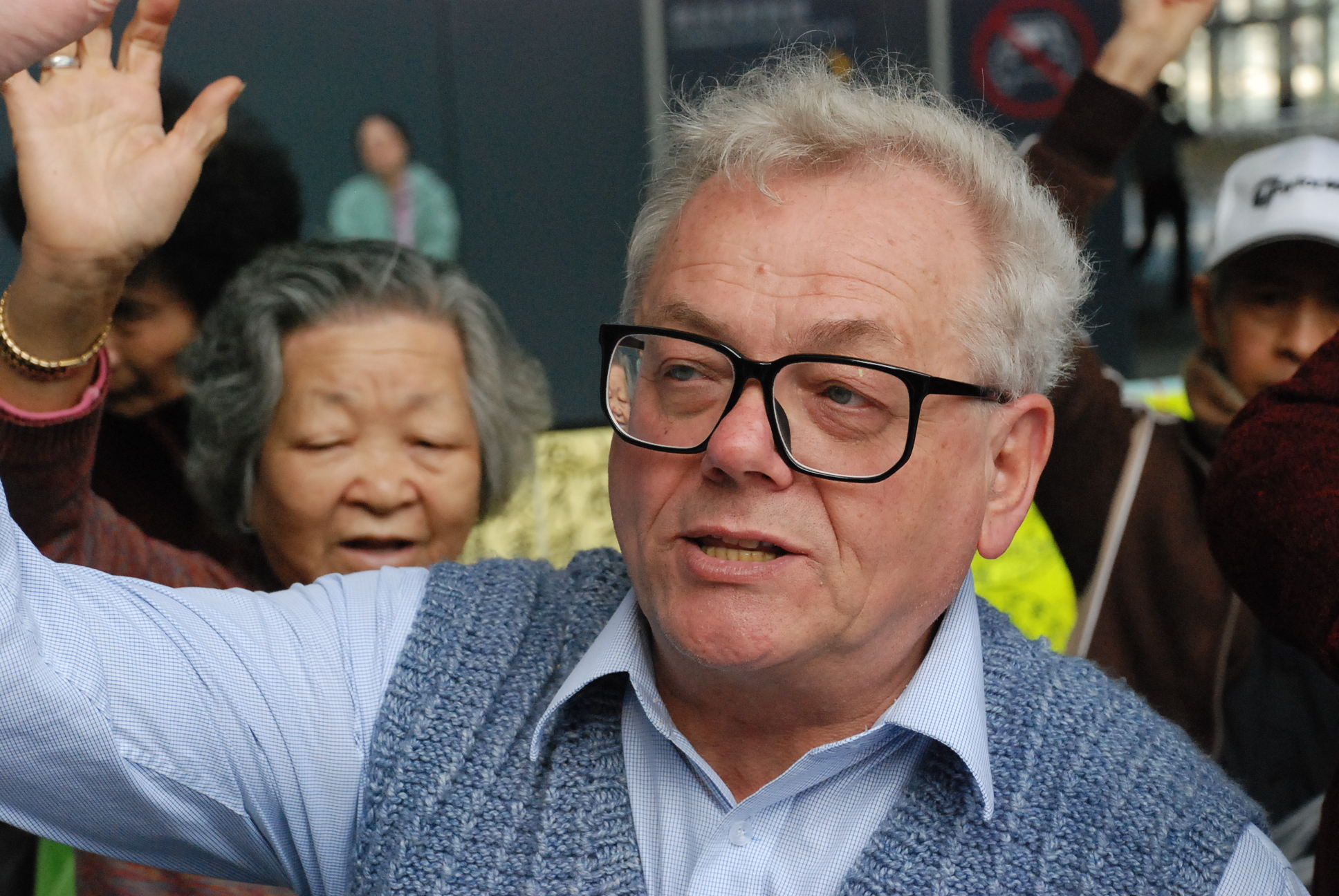
- Father Mella in a 2013 Hong Kong protest
- Born: 1948 (age 76–77); Milan, Italy

Chinese name
- Chinese: 甘浩望
Transcriptions
Standard Mandarin
- Hanyu Pinyin: Gān Hàowàng
Yue: Cantonese
- Jyutping: Gam^{1} Hou^{6}-mong^{6}

Franco Mella (born 1948) is an Italian Roman Catholic priest and Maoist social activist. Since arriving in Hong Kong in 1974, he has been known as an advocate for the rights of the disadvantaged in both Hong Kong and mainland China. Mella is a member of the Pontifical Institute of Foreign Missions.

In the 1970s and 1980s, Mella led a protest against the British Hong Kong government for the rights of the Yau Ma Tei boat people and their mainland wives. The 1999 film Ordinary Heroes directed by Ann Hui is partly based on this story.

In 2011, Mella was barred from entering mainland China, which he linked to the rising tensions between the Chinese government and the Holy See.
