= 1971–72 South African cricket season =

Cricket Season

This article is a review of the 1971–72 South African cricket season.

== Honours ==
- Currie Cup – Transvaal
- Gillette Cup – Eastern Province

== Events ==
The 1971–72 South African cricket season was the first one following the isolation placed on South African cricket as a result of the apartheid policies practised by the South African Government.

A scheduled tour by England to South Africa had been cancelled and so the South African Cricket Association decided on 23 January to extend the Currie Cup, which had nearly been completed, to a full round of home and away matches. A proposed tour of Australia late in 1971-72 was in doubt, and was later called off, and the prospects of future international cricket looked unlikely.

In the event, a tour by the New Zealand women's cricket team in 1971-72 proved to be the last official international cricket that South Africa would play until the apartheid laws were repealed.

== Sources ==
- Wisden Cricketers Almanack 1972
