= Helmut Martin =

German sinologist (1940 – 1999)

Helmut Martin (5 May 1940 in Kassel, Germany – 8 June 1999) was a German sinologist best known for his work on modern Chinese literature.

== Biography ==
Martin studied Sinology and Slavic Studies in Munich, Belgrade, Paris and Heidelberg. He earned his doctorate with Wolfgang Bauer in 1966, on the subject of Li Yu's dramaturgy. He then won a post-doctoral scholarship and went National Taiwan University, where, among other things, he edited a 15-volume complete works of Li Yu's works, which was published in 1970. After a short stay in Kyoto, he returned to Germany in the early 1970s, and was initially a China officer at the Institute for Asian Studies in Hamburg.

In 1997 he did his habilitation with Wolfgang Franke, with the work “Chinese language planning”.

He started the journal China Aktuell, and in 1977, with his wife, published a Chinese-English dictionary of politics and economy in the People's Republic of China (Langenscheidt-Wörterbuch Chinesisch-deutscher Wortschatz. Politik und Wirtschaft der VR China).

From 1979 he was Professor, and Chair of Chinese Language and Literature at Ruhr-Universität Bochum, and a visiting professor in East Asia and the USA. The State Language Institute of North Rhine-Westphalia (Landesspracheninstitut Nordrhein-Westfalen) and the founding in 1993 of the Richard Wilhelm Translation Center (Richard-Wilhelm-Übersetzungszentrum) at Ruhr University, one of three translation centers for Chinese literature worldwide, were also his initiative.

From 1990 Martin was involved in the German Association for Chinese Studies (DVCS) and was its chair from 1995 until the time of his death.

Since 1974, when he translated and published previously unpublished works of Mao Zedong, Martin had a tense relationship with the PR China. He was barred from entering the PRC because of his criticism of the Chinese leadership, his sympathy for Chinese writers and intellectuals and his views on the violent ending of the Tian’anmen protests in 1989.

He took his own life on 8 June 1999, aged 59, and is buried in the Melaten-Friedhof, Cologne.

== Publications ==
Martin published hundreds of articles on China and Chinese literature and was also the editor of several publications about China.

- Literature by and about Helmut Martin in the German National Library catalogue
