= History of cricket in South Africa from 1970–71 to 1990 =

This article describes the history of South African cricket from 1971 to 1990. Following the D'Oliveira affair in 1968, feeling against South Africa's application of apartheid to sport grew to the extent that by 1971 the country was isolated in sporting terms. The Test series against Australia in 1969–70 was to be their last for 22 years.

For a description of South African cricket in the years of isolation, see: International cricket in South Africa from 1971 to 1981.

Nelson Mandela was released from Victor Verster Prison in Paarl on 11 February 1990. This event and date effectively marked the end of apartheid and the way was soon clear for the South African team to return to the international arena.

== Domestic cricket from 1971 to 1990 ==
=== Currie Cup winners from 1970-71 to 1989-90 ===
1. 1970-71 Transvaal
2. 1971-72 Transvaal
3. 1972-73 Transvaal
4. 1973-74 Natal
5. 1974-75 Western Province
6. 1975-76 Natal
7. 1978-79 Transvaal
8. 1979-80 Transvaal
9. 1980-81 Natal
10. 1981-82 Western Province
11. 1982-83 Transvaal
12. 1983-84 Transvaal
13. 1984-85 Transvaal
14. 1985-86 Western Province
15. 1986-87 Transvaal
16. 1987-88 Transvaal
17. 1988-89 Eastern Province
18. 1989-90 Eastern Province and Western Province (shared)

=== Standard Bank Cup / B&H Series winners to 1989-90 ===
This competition is a limited overs knockout with 50 overs per innings

1. 1981-82 Transvaal
2. 1982-83 Transvaal
3. 1983-84 Natal
4. 1984-85 Transvaal
5. 1985-86 Western Province
6. 1986-87 Western Province
7. 1987-88 Western Province
8. 1988-89 Orange Free State
9. 1989-90 Eastern Province

== International tours of South Africa from 1970-71 to 1989-90 ==
Despite the official ban on tours to South Africa during this period, several private tours did take place, some of them arousing great controversy. For information about the unofficial tours, see: International cricket in South Africa from 1971 to 1981 and South African rebel tours. South Africa resumed official international cricket in 1991 when the team made a short tour of India. It then played in the 1992 Cricket World Cup in Australia and New Zealand. All of the matches played during the rebel tours had been granted first-class status, but this was subsequently and controversially withdrawn by the ICC in 1993. In August 2007, the ICC was reviewing the status of all matches played in South Africa between 1961 and 1991, including those played during the rebel tours, with a view to restoring first-class status to some matches.

== External sources ==
- CricketArchive – itinerary of South African cricket
