= List of people banned from entering Ukraine =

The list of persons posing a threat to the national security of Ukraine, (Note: Ukrainian: Перелік осіб, які створюють загрозу нацбезпеці України, transliterated: Perelik osib, yaki stvoryuyut' zagrozu natsbezpetsi Ukraini) or the Black List of the Ministry of Culture of Ukraine is a list maintained by the Ministry of Culture of Ukraine and the Security Service of Ukraine is an on-going list of persons who pose a threat to national security of Ukraine, compiled by the Ministry of Culture of Ukraine on the basis of appeals from the Security Service of Ukraine, the National Security and Defense Council and/or the National Council for Television and Radio Broadcasting. Following the annexation of Crimea by Russia and the war in Donbas, the Ukrainian government has banned from entering Ukraine a number of Russian and international celebrities for public support of the annexation or for visiting Crimea in violation of the acting Ukrainian legislation.

== History ==
On July 8, 2015, radical activists of the "Otpor" (Ukrainian "Vidsich") movement held a theatrical action under the building of the Ministry of Culture of Ukraine demanding that any broadcast of films, songs, programs, shows and other content be banned. The young people handed over a list of 568 Russian artists and TV stars who, according to activists, should be banned. According to the Ministry of Culture of Ukraine, the list contained 567 people. On the same day, the Ministry of Culture of Ukraine sent to the Ministry of Foreign Affairs of Ukraine and the Security Service of Ukraine a list with updated data on 117 cultural figures of the Russian Federation who publicly supported the anti-Ukrainian military aggression in eastern Ukraine, the annexation of Crimea and those who expressed objections about the state sovereignty and independence of Ukraine, on which it was proposed to apply restrictive measures in accordance with the law " On Sanctions ", adopted by the Verkhovna Rada of Ukraine in 2014.

=== Ratification of the List ===
On August 7, 2015, the SBU provided the Ministry of Culture of Ukraine with a list of 14 people whose actions, according to the SBU, pose a threat to the national security of Ukraine. On August 8 of the same year, the Ministry of Culture of Ukraine published this list. Most of the people on this list have already been declared persona non grata in Ukraine. The following day, based on the list received, the Ministry created the formal list.

== Selected individuals ==
The list has a confirmed 200 individuals as of 2023.

| Individual | Photo | Nationality | Occupation | Date of ban |
|---|---|---|---|---|
| Lev Leschenko | | Russia | Singer | 2014 |
| Ivan Okhlobystin | | Russia | Actor | 2014 |
| Mikhail Porechenkov | | Russia | Actor | 2014 |
| Karen Shakhnazarov | | Russia | Filmmaker | 2014 |
| Sergey Bezrukov | | Russia | Actor | 2014 |
| Vladimir Bortko | | Russia | Film director | 2015 |
| Mikhail Boyarsky | | Russia | Actor | 2015 |
| Evelina Blyodans | | Russia | Actress | 2015 |
| Oleg Gazmanov | | Russia | Singer | 2015 |
| Iosif Prigozhin | | Russia | Music producer | 2015 |
| Nikolay Rastorguyev | | Russia | Singer | 2015 |
| Grigory Leps | | Russia | Singer | 2015 |
| Roy Jones Jr. | | Russia; United States | Boxer | 2015 |
| Maxim Kalashnikov (Vladimir Kucherenko) | | Russia | Actor | 2015 |
| Yegor Kholmogorov | | Russia | Nationalist writer | 2015 |
| Mikhail Khazin | | Russia | Economist and writer | 2015 |
| Stas Piekha | | Russia | Singer | 2015 |
| Valeriya | | Russia | Singer | 2015 |
| Sergey Penkin | | Russia | Singer | 2015 |
| Alexander Rosenbaum | | Russia | Singer | 2015 |
| Yulia Chicherina | | Russia | Singer | 2015 |
| Pavel Lungin | | Russia | Film director | 2015 |
| Nikolai Dobrynin | | Russia | Actor | 2016 |
| Guf | | Russia | Rapper | 2016 |
| Pavel Gusev | | Russia | Journalist | 2016 |
| Natasha Korolyova | | Russia | Singer | 2016 |
| Kristina Orbakaite | | Russia | Singer | 2016 |
| Valentina Telichkina | | Russia | Actress | 2016 |
| Denis Maidanov | | Russia | Singer | 2017 |
| Lolita Milyavskaya | | Russia | Actress | 2017 |
| Yuliya Samoylova | | Russia | Singer | 2017 |
| Kirill Safonov | | Russia | Actor | 2017 |
| Steven Seagal | | Russia; United States | Actor | 2017 |
| Stanislav Sadalsky | | Russia | Actor | 2017 |
| Ivars Kalniņš | | Latvia | Actor | 2017 |
| Sergei Glushko | | Russia | Actor & model | 2017 |
| Nikolay Tsiskaridze | | Russia | Ballet dancer | 2017 |
| Evgeny Grishkovetz | | Russia | Writer | 2017 |
| Andrey Merzlikin | | Russia | Actor | 2017 |
| Dmitry Pevtsov | | Russia | Actor | 2017 |
| Lyudmila Chursina | | Russia | Actress | 2017 |
| Egor Kreed (Egor Bulatkin) | | Russia | Rapper | 2017 |
| Nadezhda Babkina | | Russia | Singer | 2017 |
| Larisa Guzeyeva | | Russia | Actress & TV host | 2017 |
| Nikita Mikhalkov | | Russia | Film director | 2018 |
| Ilya Reznik | | Russia | Poet | 2018 |
| Aleksandr Marshal (Aleksandr Minkov) | | Russia | Singer | 2018 |
| Larisa Dolina | | Russia | Singer | 2018 |
| Aleksandr Bashirov | | Russia | Actor | 2018 |
| Alisa Freindlich | | Russia | Actress | 2018 |
| Zakhar Prilepin | | Russia | Writer | 2018 |
| Svetlana Surganova | | Russia | Singer | 2018 |
| Fyodor Dobronravov | | Russia | Actor | 2018 |
| Michele Placido | | Italy | Actor | 2018 |
| Leonid Yarmolnik | | Russia | Actor | 2018 |
| Miloš Biković | | Russia; Serbia | Actor and producer | 2019 |
| Goran Bregović | | Bosnia and Herzegovina | Musician | 2015 |
| Albano Carrisi | | Italy | Tenor | 2019 |
| Valeriy Syutkin | | Russia | Singer | 2020 |
| Kostadin Kostadinov | | Bulgaria | Politician | 2022 |
| Michael Kretschmer | | Germany | Politician and minister president of Saxony | 2022 |
| Pupo (Enzo Ghinazzi) | | Italy | Singer | 2022 |
| Anna Netrebko | | Russia; Austria | Opera singer | 2023 |
| Wang Fang | | China | Opera singer | 2023 |
| George Simion | | Romania | Politician | 2024 |

== Individuals previously banned or refused entry ==
These individuals have at some point been banned from entering Ukraine; these individuals are either deceased or have eventually been allowed entry.

| Individual | Photo | Nationality | Occupation | Ban dates |
|---|---|---|---|---|
| Jared Hasselhoff | | United States | Musician | 2013–2018 |
| Mikhail Zadornov | | Russia | Comedian | 2014–2017 (deceased) |
| Joseph Kobzon | | Russia | Singer | 2014–2018 (deceased) |
| Valentina Talyzina | | Russia | Actress | 2014–2025 (deceased) |
| Silvio Berlusconi | | Italy | Politician and Media Tycoon | 2015–2018 |
| Stanislav Govorukhin | | Russia | Film director | 2017–2018 (deceased) |
| Elina Bystritskaya | | Russia | Actress | 2017–2019 (deceased) |
| Otar Kushanashvili | | Russia; Georgia | Music journalist | 2016–2019 |
| Gerard Depardieu | | Russia; France | Actor and filmmaker | 2015–2020 |
| Fred Durst | | United States | Rapper & singer | 2015–2020 |
| Valentin Gaft | | Russia | Actor | 2015–2020 (deceased) |
| Vasily Lanovoy | | Russia | Actor | 2015–2021 (deceased) |
| Vladimir Menshov | | Russia | Actor | 2018–2021 (deceased) |
| Andrew Murray | | United Kingdom | Trade unionist | 2018–2021 |
| Kirill Grebenshchikov | | Russia | Actor | 2020–2023 |

== See also ==
- List of people and organizations sanctioned during the Russo-Ukrainian War
- International sanctions during the Russo-Ukrainian War
- Boycott Russian Films
