= Xiong Guangkai =

Chinese general

- 熊光楷
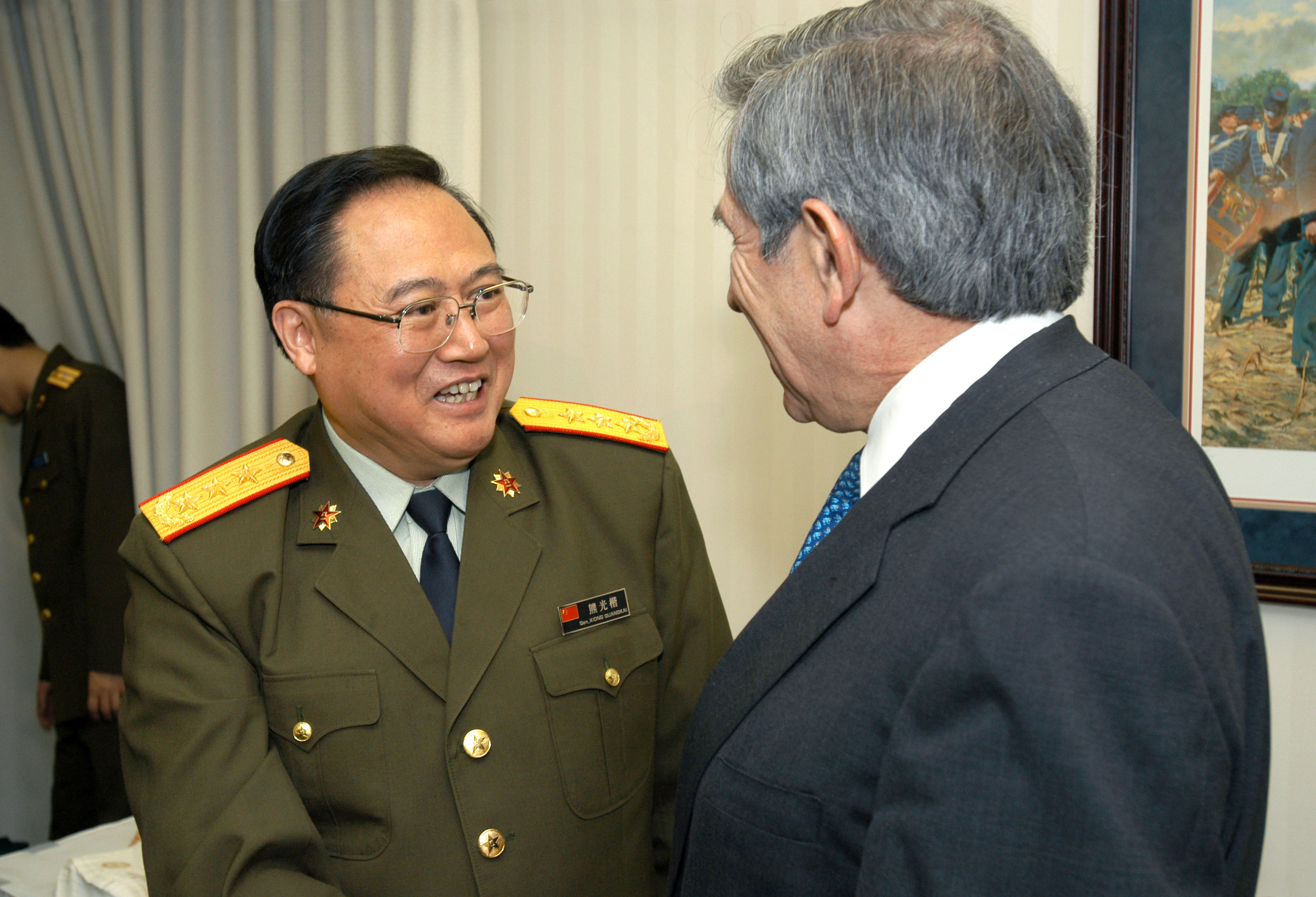
- Xiong in April 2005

Head of the Intelligence Bureau of the PLA General Staff Department
- In office 12 August 1988 – November 1992
- Preceded by: Cao Xin
- Succeeded by: Luo Yudong

Personal details
- Born: 15 March 1939 (age 87) Shanghai, China
- Party: Chinese Communist Party
- Education: PLA Foreign Language College

Military service
- Allegiance: People's Republic of China
- Branch/service: People's Liberation Army Ground Force
- Years of service: 1956–2006
- Rank: General

Chinese name
- Chinese: 熊光楷
Transcriptions
Standard Mandarin
- Hanyu Pinyin: Xióng Guāngkǎi
- Wade–Giles: Hsiung^{2} Kuang^{1}-k'ai^{3}
Wu
- Wugniu: Yon^{6} Kuaon^{1}-kha^{5}

Xiong Guangkai (Chinese: 熊光楷; pinyin: Xióng Guāngkǎi; born 15 March 1939) is a retired Chinese general.

== Biography ==
Xiong was born in Shanghai on 15 March 1939, while his ancestral home in Nanchang, Jiangxi. He joined the People's Liberation Army (PLA) in 1956 and the Chinese Communist Party (CCP) in 1959. Xiong was deputy director (1984–88) and later Director (1988–92) of the Intelligence Bureau of the PLA General Staff Department, Assistant (1992–96) and later Deputy Chief-of Staff (1996–2005). In 1988 he was conferred the rank of Major General, in 1994 Lieutenant General and in 2000 General.

Xiong also served on the Central Leading Group on Taiwan, He was an alternate member of the 14th, 15th and 16th Central Committees and is currently an adjunct professor at Qinghua and Beijing Universities and Chairman of the China Institute for International Strategic Studies (CIISS), where he succeeded Xu Xin.

In 1995, during the Third Taiwan Strait Crisis, a conversation between Xiong and American diplomat Chas Freeman was widely quoted as a nuclear threat against Los Angeles:

In the 1950s, you three times threatened nuclear strikes on China, and you could do that because we couldn't hit back. Now we can. So you are not going to threaten us again because, in the end, you care a lot more about Los Angeles than Taipei.

Freeman later restated the account with the clarification "Please note the statement is in a deterrent context and it is consistent with no first use. It is not a threat to bomb Los Angeles."

== On China-Pakistan Relations ==
When confronted about Beijing's uncompromising support for Pakistan, Xiong Guangkai famously said, "Pakistan is China's Israel." Andrew Small, the author of The China-Pakistan Axis: Asia's New Geopolitics, characterizes this remark as "part explanation, part sarcastic jibe, delivered by (China's) military intelligence chief after one too many meetings with US counterparts on the subject."

Military offices
Preceded by Cao Xin	Head of the Intelligence Bureau of the PLA General Staff Department; 1988–1992	Succeeded by Luo Yudong
