= China–Pakistan relations =

- Pakistan: China

Diplomatic mission
- Embassy of Pakistan, Beijing: Embassy of China, Islamabad

Envoy
- Ambassador Moin ul Haque: Ambassador Jiang Zaidong

Diplomatic relations between the People's Republic of China (PRC) and the Islamic Republic of Pakistan were established in 1950, when the Dominion of Pakistan was among the first countries to sever diplomatic relations with the Republic of China (ROC) government in favour of recognizing the PRC as the legitimate representative of China. Since then, relations between the two countries have been extremely cordial for the last few decades, which are influenced by their similar geopolitical and mutual interests. Although both countries have vast cultural and religious differences, they have developed a special partnership. Both countries have placed considerable importance on the maintenance of the relationship between them, and their regular exchanges of high-level visits have culminated in the establishment of various cooperative measures. China has provided economic, technical, and military assistance to Pakistan; both sides regard each other as close strategic allies. The two countries define their relationship as an all-weather strategic cooperative partnership.

Bilateral relations have evolved from China's initial policy of neutrality to an extensive partnership driven primarily by Pakistan's strategic importance. The two countries formally resolved all of their boundary disputes with the Sino-Pakistan Agreement of 1963, and Chinese military assistance to Pakistan began in 1966; a strategic alliance was formed in 1972, and economic cooperation had begun in earnest by 1979. Consequently, China has become Pakistan's third-largest trading partner overall. In 1986, Pakistani president Zia-ul-Haq visited China to improve diplomatic relations, and Pakistan was one of the to offer support to China in the aftermath of the 1989 Tiananmen Square protests and massacre. More recently, China has moved forward with an agreement to cooperate in improving the Pakistani civil nuclear power sector. In 2015, the two countries launched the China–Pakistan Economic Corridor, which is part of the larger Belt and Road Initiative.

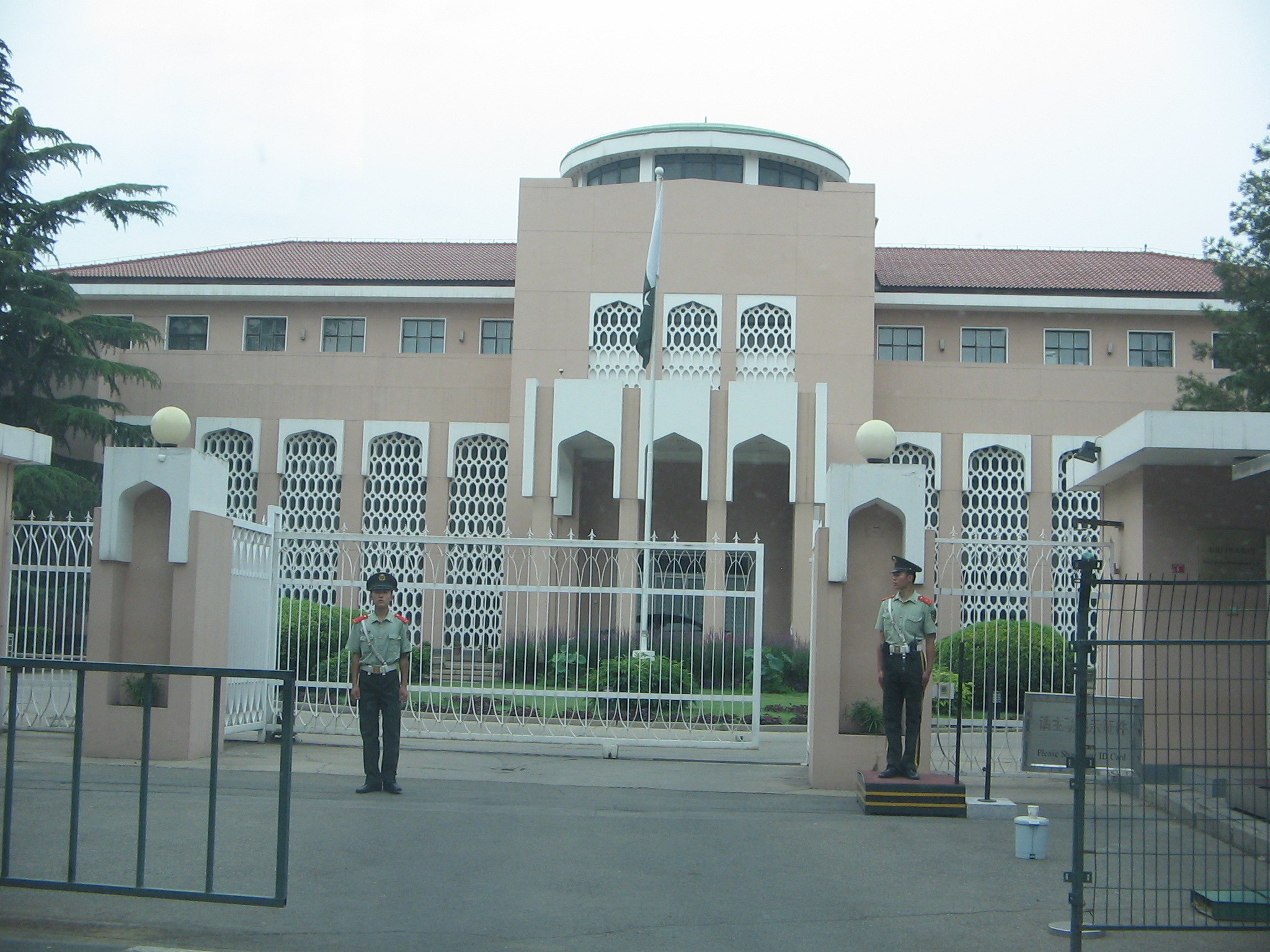
Pakistani embassy in Beijing, China

Maintaining close relations with China is also a central part of Pakistan's foreign policy. On the military front, the People's Liberation Army and the Pakistan Armed Forces share a notably close relationship; China has supported Pakistan's position on the Kashmir conflict, while Pakistan has supported China's position on Xinjiang, Tibet, the territorial disputes in the South China Sea, the Sino-Indian border dispute and the political status of Taiwan. Military cooperation between the two sides has continued to increase significantly, with joint projects producing armaments ranging from fighter jets to guided missile frigates. The overwhelming majority of Pakistan's arms imports are from China, and the country makes up the majority of China's arms exports. Both countries have generally pursued a bilateral policy that focuses to strengthen their alliance in all areas. While serving as China's main bridge to the Muslim world, Pakistan has also played an important role in closing the communication gap between China and the United States—namely through the 1972 visit by Richard Nixon to China. Recent rankings have described Pakistan as the country that is most under Chinese political influence.

== History ==
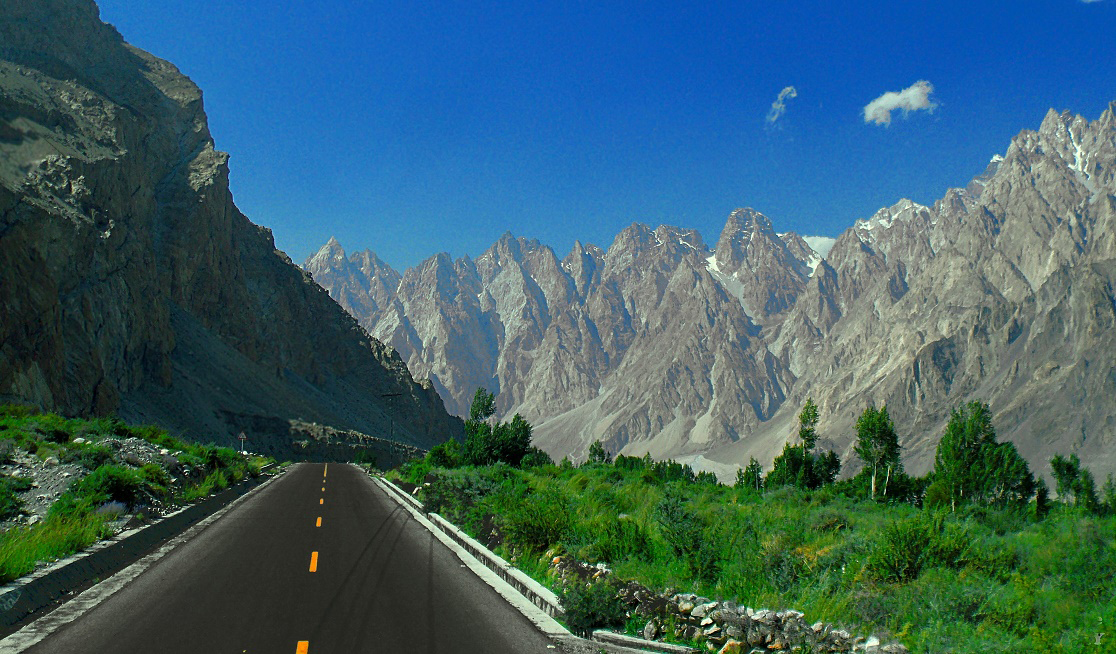
The Karakoram Highway connects the two countries.

Pakistan has a long and strong relationship with China. The long-standing ties between the two countries have been mutually beneficial. A close identity of views and mutual interests remain the centre-point of bilateral ties. Since the 1962 Sino-Indian War, Pakistan has supported China on most issues of importance to the latter, especially those related to Taiwan, Xinjiang, and Tibet and other sensitive issues deemed by the West as human rights issues.

The Chinese leadership has acknowledged Pakistan's steadfast support on key issues. Pakistan helped China in reestablishing formal ties with the West, where they helped make possible the 1972 Nixon visit to China. Pakistan has collaborated with China in extensive military and economic projects, seeing both as counterweights to an Indian-Western alliance. Pakistan has also served as a conduit for China's influence in the Muslim world.

China also has a consistent record of supporting Pakistan in regional issues. Pakistan's military depends heavily on Chinese armaments, and joint projects of both economic and militaristic importance are ongoing. China has supplied blueprints to support Pakistan's nuclear program.

Amin argues that the basis of the Sino-Pak entente from its beginning has been "a mutual need to pool together resources to contain perceived Indian aspirations to hegemony over South Asia". He continues: "Both China and Pakistan regard the entente as necessary to maintain a balance of power in the subcontinent favourable to themselves against an India that is believed by both Chinese and Pakistani strategists to be an expansionist power that occupies land regarded as properly belonging to Beijing and Islamabad respectively, and that is intent on expanding further".

=== Historical relations ===
Buddhist monks from the area of what is now Khyber Pakhtunkhwa region of Pakistan were involved in the Silk Road transmission of Buddhism to Han dynasty China. The Han dynasty's Protectorate of the Western Regions bordered the Kushan Empire. Faxian travelled in what is now modern-day Pakistan.

During World War II, the Hui Muslim imam Da Pusheng (Chinese: 达浦生) toured the Middle East and South Asia to confront Japanese propagandists in Muslim countries and denounce their "invasion" to the Islamic world. Misinformation on the war was spread in the Islamic Middle Eastern nations by Japanese agents. In response, at the World Islamic Congress in Hejaz, Imam Du openly confronted fake Muslim Japanese agents and exposed them as non-Muslims. Japan's history of imperialism was explained by Du to his fellow Muslims. Muhammad Ali Jinnah, the future founder of Pakistan, met with Imam Du. The Chinese Muslims in the Second Sino-Japanese War received a pledge of support from Jinnah. The Hindu leaders Tagore and Gandhi and Muslim Jinnah both discussed the war with the Chinese Muslim delegation under Ma Fuliang while in Turkey President İsmet İnönü also met the delegation. Gandhi and Jinnah met with the Hui Ma Fuliang and his delegation as they denounced Japan.

=== 1947–1961: Relations between China and the newly independent state ===
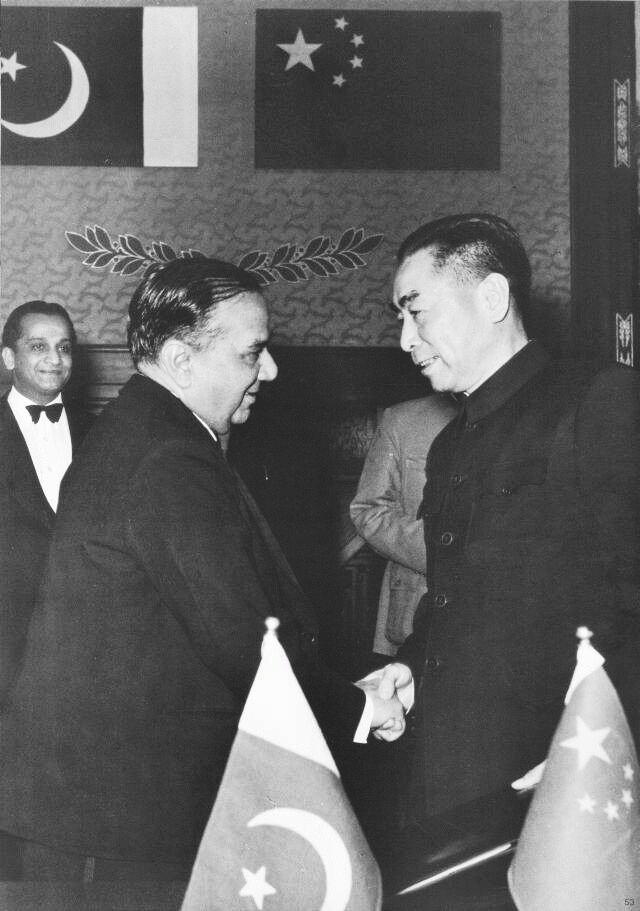
Pakistani Prime Minister Huseyn Shaheed Suhrawardy and Chinese Premier Zhou Enlai signing the Treaty of Friendship Between China and Pakistan in Beijing in 1956.

The Chinese communists defeated the Nationalists in the Chinese Civil War. On 1 October 1949, CCP chairman Mao Zedong announced the founding of the People's Republic of China. Pakistan recognized the new Chinese government on 4 January 1950, becoming the first Muslim country to do so. Diplomatic relations between Pakistan and China were established on 21 May 1951. While initially ambivalent towards the idea of a Communist country on its borders, Pakistan hoped that China would serve as a counterweight to Indian influence. India had recognised China a year before, and Indian Prime Minister Nehru also hoped for closer relations with the Chinese. In 1956, Pakistani Prime Minister Huseyn Shaheed Suhrawardy and Chinese Premier Zhou Enlai signed the Treaty of Friendship Between China and Pakistan, marking closer bilateral ties.

=== 1962–present: "all-weather" diplomatic relations ===
With escalating border tensions leading to the 1962 Sino-Indian war, China and Pakistan aligned with each other in a joint effort to counter India and the Soviet Union as both have border disputes with India. One year after China's border war with India, Pakistan and China signed the Sino-Pakistan Agreement. The agreement resulted in China and Pakistan each withdrawing from about 1,900 square kilometres (750 square miles) of territory, and a boundary on the basis of the 1899 British Note to China as modified by Lord Curzon in 1905.

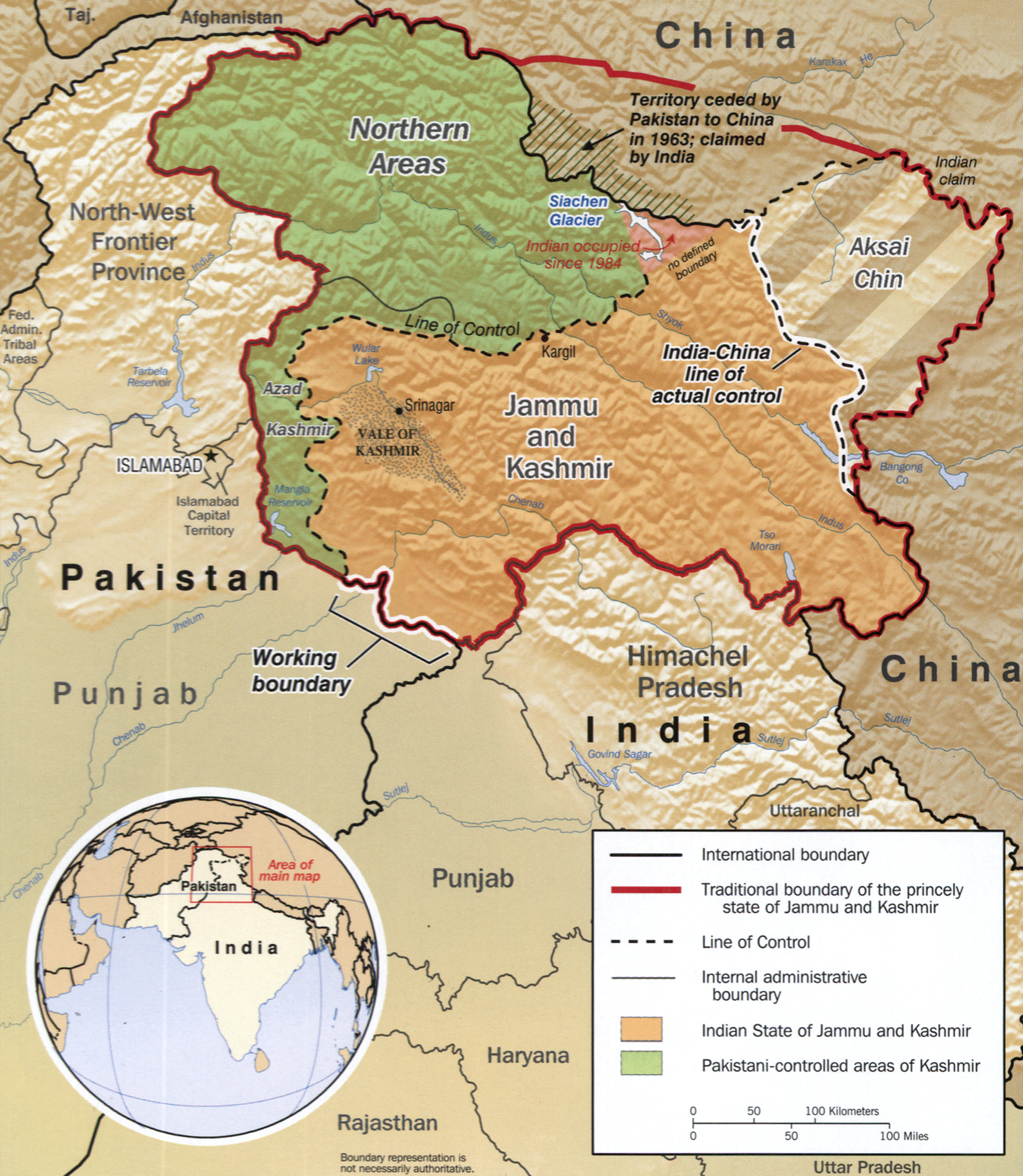
Disputed territory ceded to China in 1963

Geo-political considerations drew China and Pakistan close at a time when Pakistan was a member of two explicitly anti-communist alliances, CENTO and SEATO. Since then, the informal alliance that initially began as mutual opposition towards India has grown into a lasting relationship that has benefited both nations on the diplomatic, economic and military frontiers. Along with diplomatic support, Pakistan served as a conduit for China to open up to the West. China has in turn provided extensive economic aid and political support to Pakistan.

Since the two sides established their "all-weather diplomatic relations", there have been frequent exchanges between the two countries' leadership and peoples. For example, former Chinese Premier Zhou Enlai received warm welcomes in all of his four visits to Pakistan. When Zhou died in 1976, then-Pakistani Ambassador to China rushed to the Chinese Ministry of Foreign Affairs at 8 in the morning without appointment. Upon arriving at the ministry, the ambassador cried due to his grief in front of Chinese diplomats. In 2004, a road in Pakistani capital Islamabad leading to the Diplomatic Enclave was named "Zhou Enlai Road". It is the first road in Pakistan that is named after foreign leaders. On 27 May 1976, then Chinese Communist Party (CCP) chairman Mao Zedong, aged 83, received his last foreign guest Pakistani president Zulfiqar Ali Bhutto despite his critical illness, 105 days before his death.

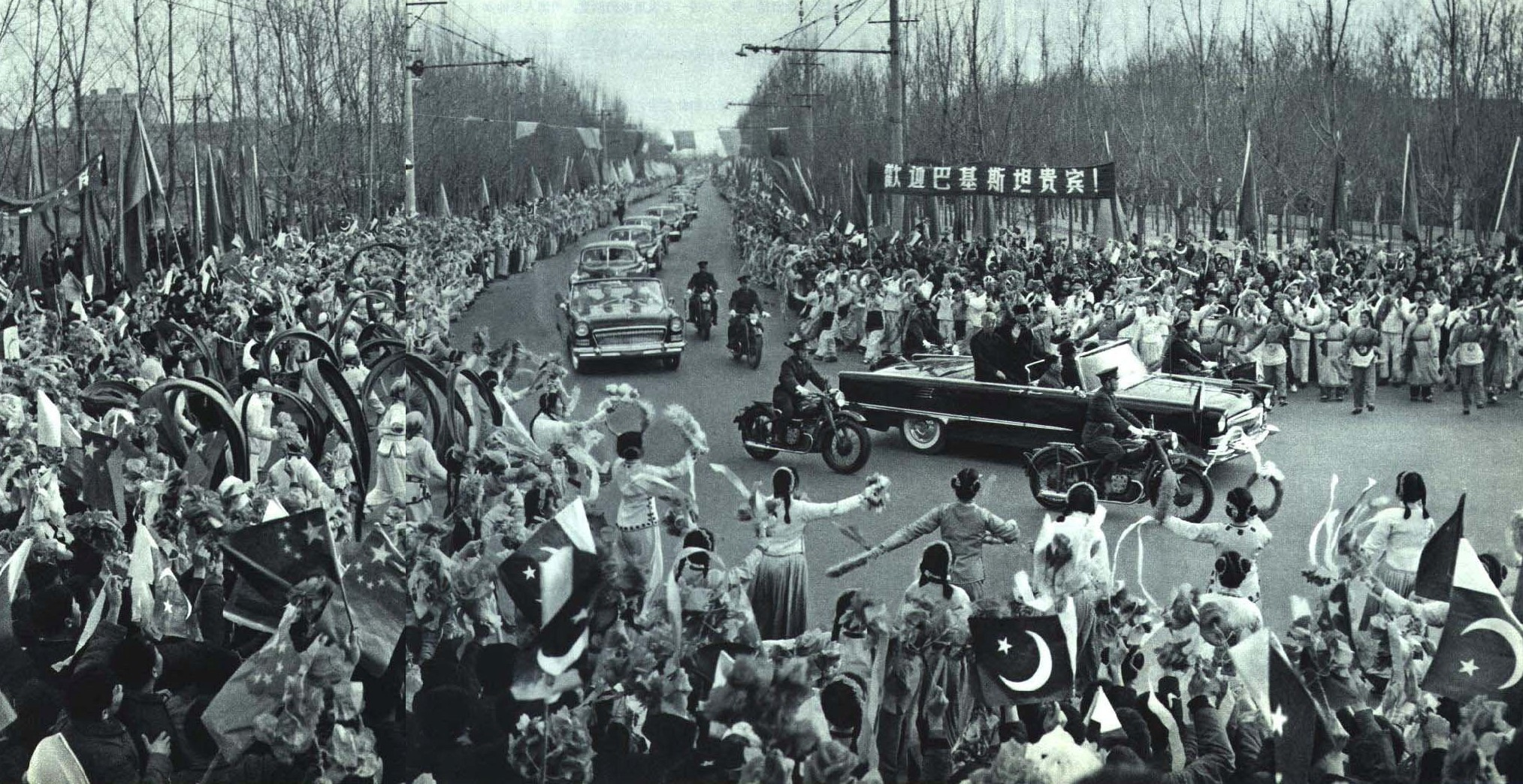
Ayub Khan's visit to Beijing in 1965.

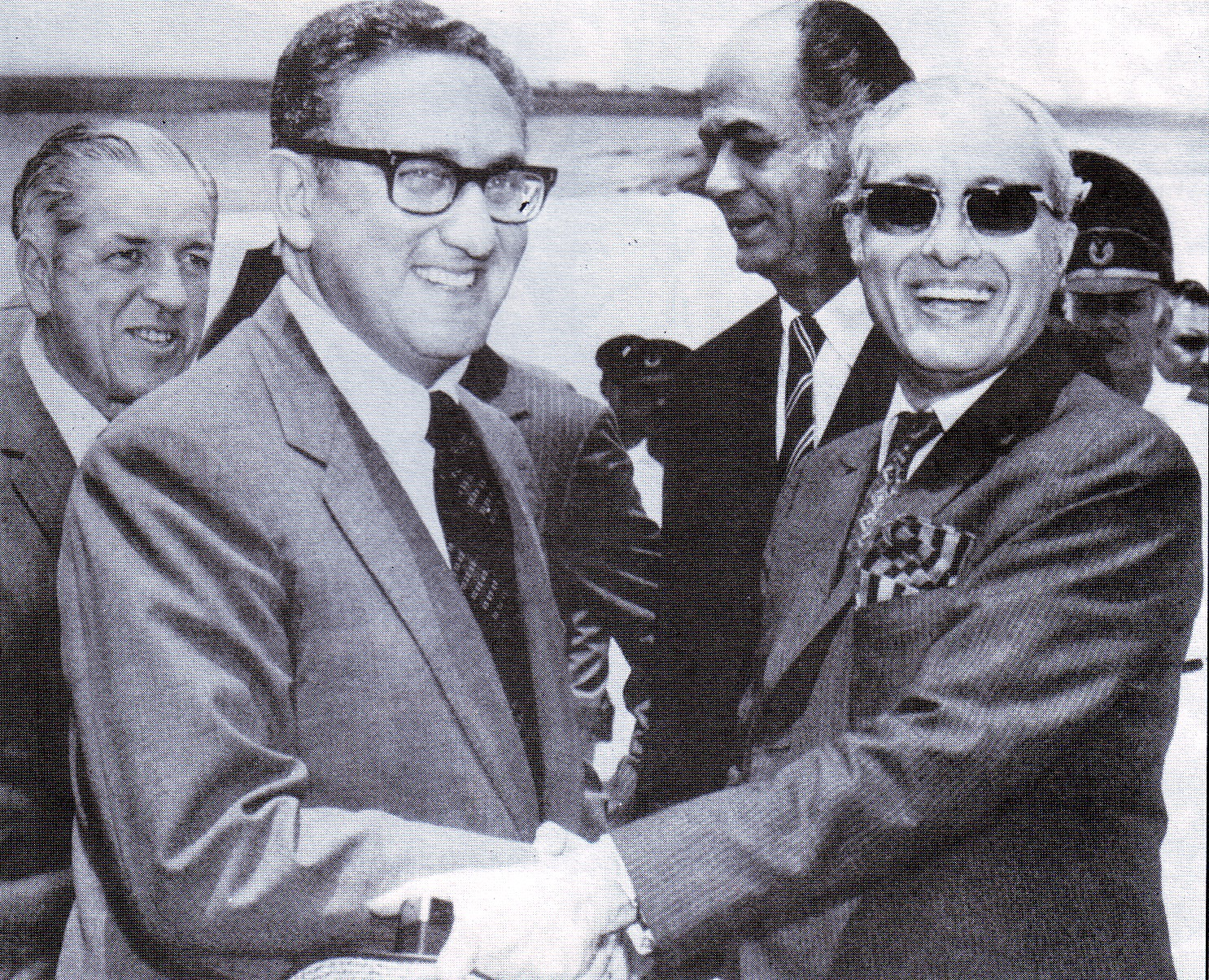
Henry Kissinger was on a secret mission to China facilitated by the government of Pakistan, a fact known to very few people including Pakistani ambassador to the US Agha Hilaly.

Pakistan's military initially depended almost entirely on American armaments and aid, which was increased during the covert U.S. support of Islamic militants in the Soviet–Afghan War. The U.S. under President Richard Nixon supported Pakistan in the 1971 Bangladesh Liberation War. During the simultaneous Bangladesh Genocide, alongside the U.S. and other nations, China helped to suppress reports of the massacres committed by Pakistan. However, the period following the Soviet withdrawal and the dissolution of the Soviet Union led indirectly to the increasing realignment of the U.S. with the previously pro-Soviet India. The Pressler Amendment in 1990 suspended all American military assistance and any new economic aid amidst concerns that Pakistan was attempting to develop a nuclear weapon. Given the support that Pakistan had given them during the War in Afghanistan, many Pakistanis saw this as a betrayal that sold out Pakistani interests in favour of India. This belief was further strengthened as India had developed a nuclear weapon without significant American opposition, and Pakistan felt obligated to do the same. Consequently, the primarily geopolitical alliance between Pakistan and China has since 1990 branched out into military and economic cooperation, due to Pakistan's belief that the U.S. influence and support in the region should be counterbalanced by the Chinese.

Since the September 11 attacks, Pakistan has increased the scope of Chinese influence and support by agreeing to a number of military projects, combined with extensive economic support and investment from the Chinese. With the U.S.-led War in Afghanistan, there is a general sentiment in Pakistan to adopt a foreign policy which favours China over the United States. Washington has been accused deserting Pakistan in favour of a policy that favours stronger relations with India, while Pakistan sees China as a more reliable ally over the long term.

The Five Principles of Peaceful Coexistence are part of China-Pakistan foreign policy discourse, and in April 2005 these principles were codified in the Treaty of Friendship, Cooperation, and Good Neighborly Relations signed between the two countries.

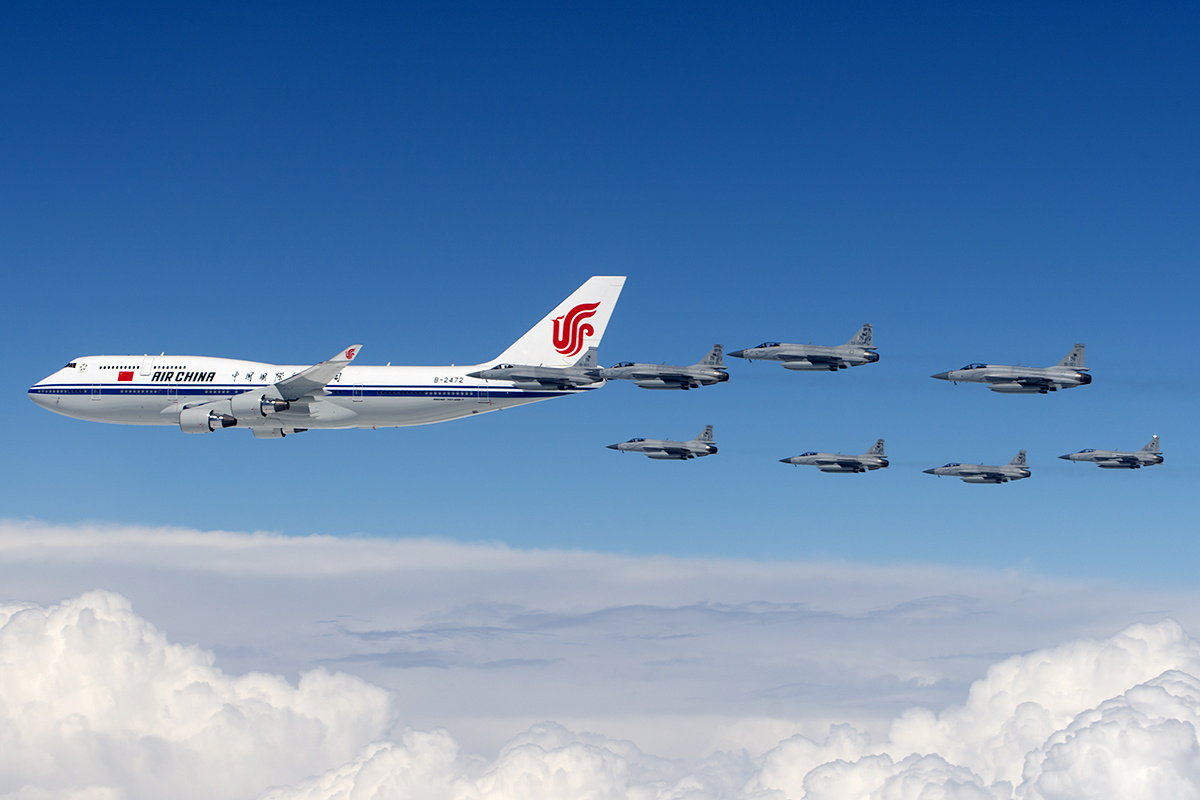
The presidential plane of PRC leader Xi Jinping escorted by eight JF-17s upon entering Pakistani airspace on a two-day official visit (2015)

On 22 May 2013, Chinese Premier Li Keqiang's airplane was escorted by six JF-17 Thunder jets, jointly developed by the two countries, as it entered Pakistani airspace. The premier was also received by both Pakistani president and prime minister upon his arrival at the airport. On 20 April 2015, Chinese leader and Communist Party General Secretary Xi Jinping visited Pakistan as his first foreign visit of the year, also the first by a paramount leader in 9 years. Before his arrival, he published an article praising the friendship on Pakistani newspapers like Daily Jang. The Chinese leader compared visiting Pakistan with visiting his brother's home. Like previous visit by Premier Li, the airplane was escorted by 8 JF-17 Thunder jets. Xi was given a grand welcome upon his arrival at Noor Khan airbase, a 21-gun salute and guard of honour was presented to him. During the visit, the two countries establish an "all-weather strategic cooperative partnership."

When I was young, I heard many touching stories about Pakistan and the friendship between our two countries. To name just a few, I learned that the Pakistani people were working hard to build their beautiful country, and that Pakistan opened an air corridor for China to reach out to the world and supported China in restoring its lawful seat in the United Nations. The stories have left me with a deep impression. I look forward to my upcoming state visit to Pakistan.

— Xi Jinping, General Secretary of the Chinese Communist Party and President of China before his 2015 visit to Pakistan,

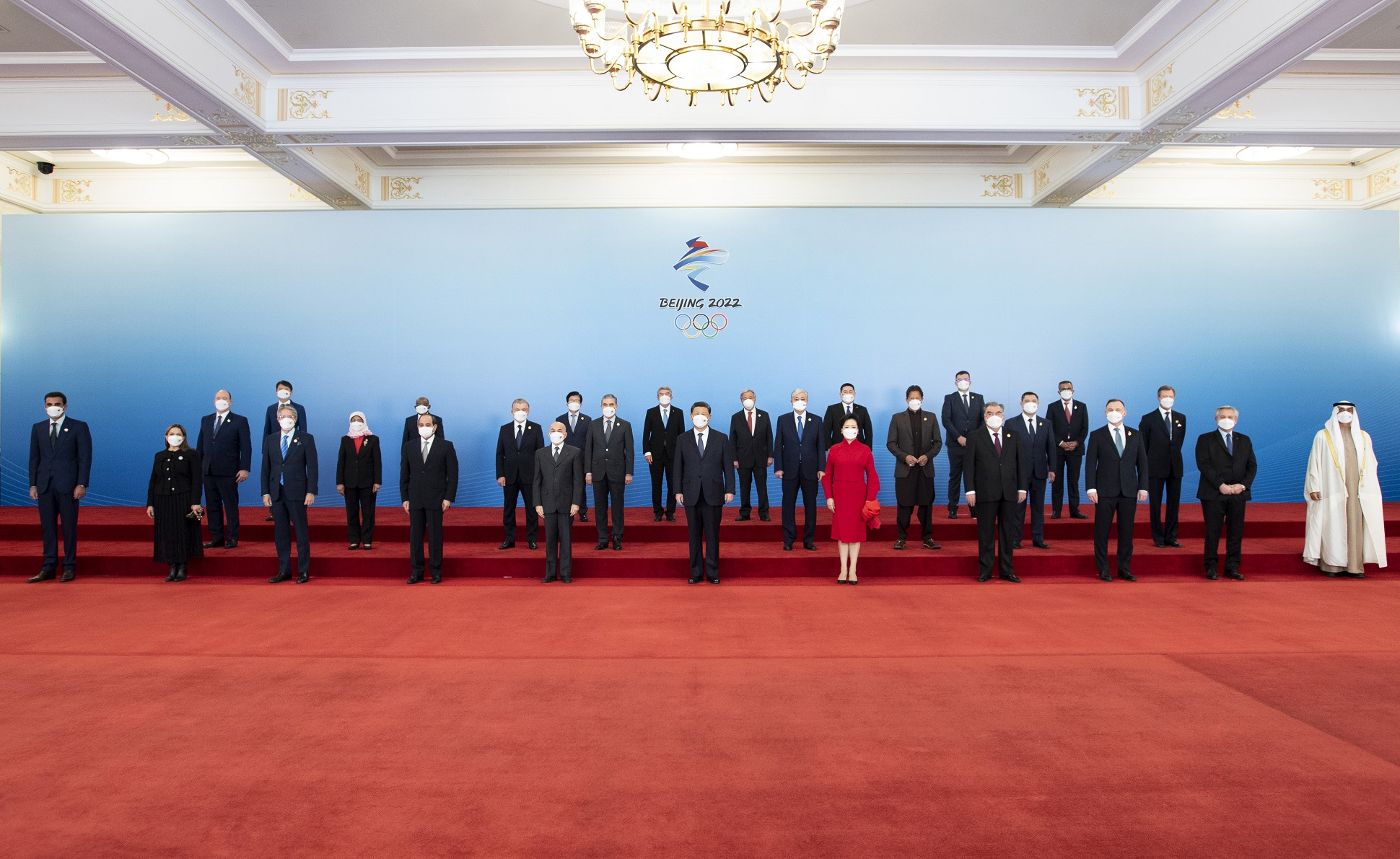
Imran Khan joins other heads of state for lunch during the 2022 Winter Olympics.

In February 2022, Prime Minister Imran Khan's presence at opening ceremony of 2022 Winter Olympics, Beijing declared support for Pakistan on the Kashmir conflict, Khan also expressed his commitment to the One-China Policy.

After 3 Chinese citizens were killed in the University of Karachi bombing in April 2022, Pakistani president Arif Alvi, PM Shehbaz Sharif, foreign minister Bilawal Bhutto and PTI leader Imran Khan visited to the Chinese embassy where they expressed condolences to the Chinese side over the deaths of the teachers, and strongly condemned the attack. In October 2024, during a seminar in Islamabad, Chinese ambassador to Pakistan Jiang Zaidong raised concern over attacks targeting Chinese workers in the country, calling their frequency "unacceptable" and a risk towards further funding of the Belt and Road Initiative. This had come after a bombing targeting Chinese engineers in Karachi earlier in the month, as well as an attack targeting Dasu Dam workers in March.

== Political relations ==
Pakistan supports China's position on Xinjiang, Tibet, the territorial disputes in the South China Sea, the Sino-Indian border dispute as well as China's claim to Arunachal Pradesh. It additionally recognizes Taiwan as an integral part of China. China, in turn, has supported Pakistan's position on the Kashmir conflict. In July 2019, Pakistan was one of 37 countries that backed China's policies in Xinjiang. In October 2020, Pakistan was one of 45 countries that signed a joint statement supporting China's Xinjiang policies. In June 2020, Pakistan was one of 53 countries that backed the Hong Kong national security law at the United Nations.

== Military relations ==
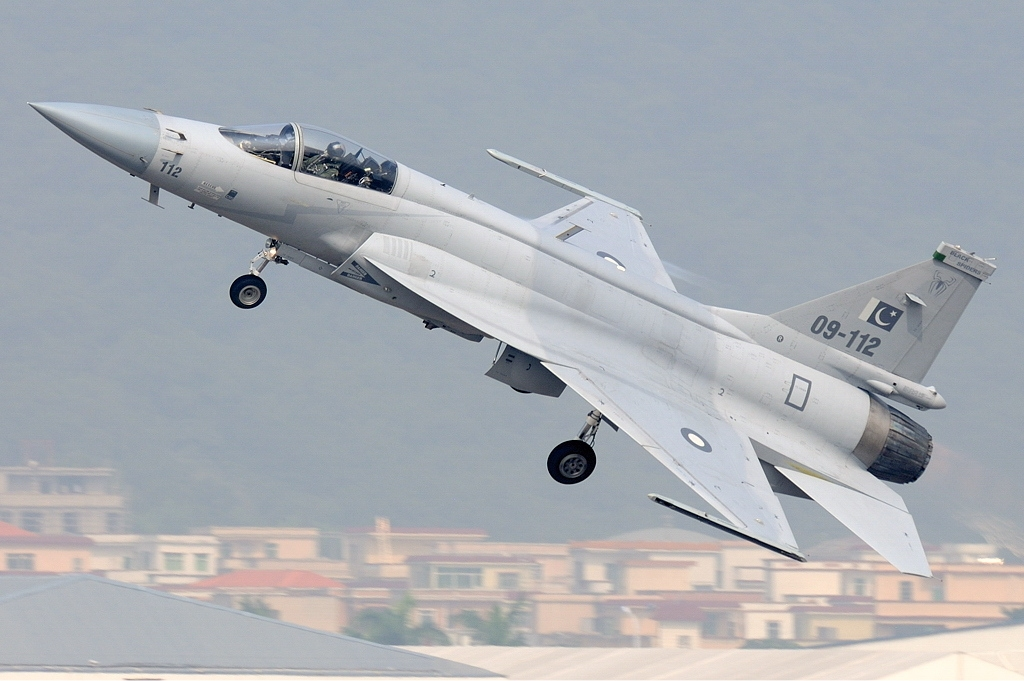
The JF-17 Thunder is a joint China-Pakistan project.

There are strong military ties between China and Pakistan. This alliance between two neighbouring East-South Asian nations is significant geopolitically. The strong military ties primarily aim to counter regional Indian and American influence, and was also to repel Soviet influence in the area. In recent years this relationship has strengthened through ongoing military projects and agreements between Pakistan and China.

The overwhelming majority of Pakistan's arms imports are from China, and the country makes up the majority of China's arms exports. According to Stockholm International Peace Research Institute (SIPRI), Pakistan is China's biggest arms buyer, counting for nearly 63% of Chinese arms exports. According to SIPRI, 81% of Pakistan's arms imports between 2019 and 2024 came from China. Since 1962, China has been a steady source of military equipment to the Pakistani Army, helping establish ammunition factories, providing technological assistance and modernising existing facilities.

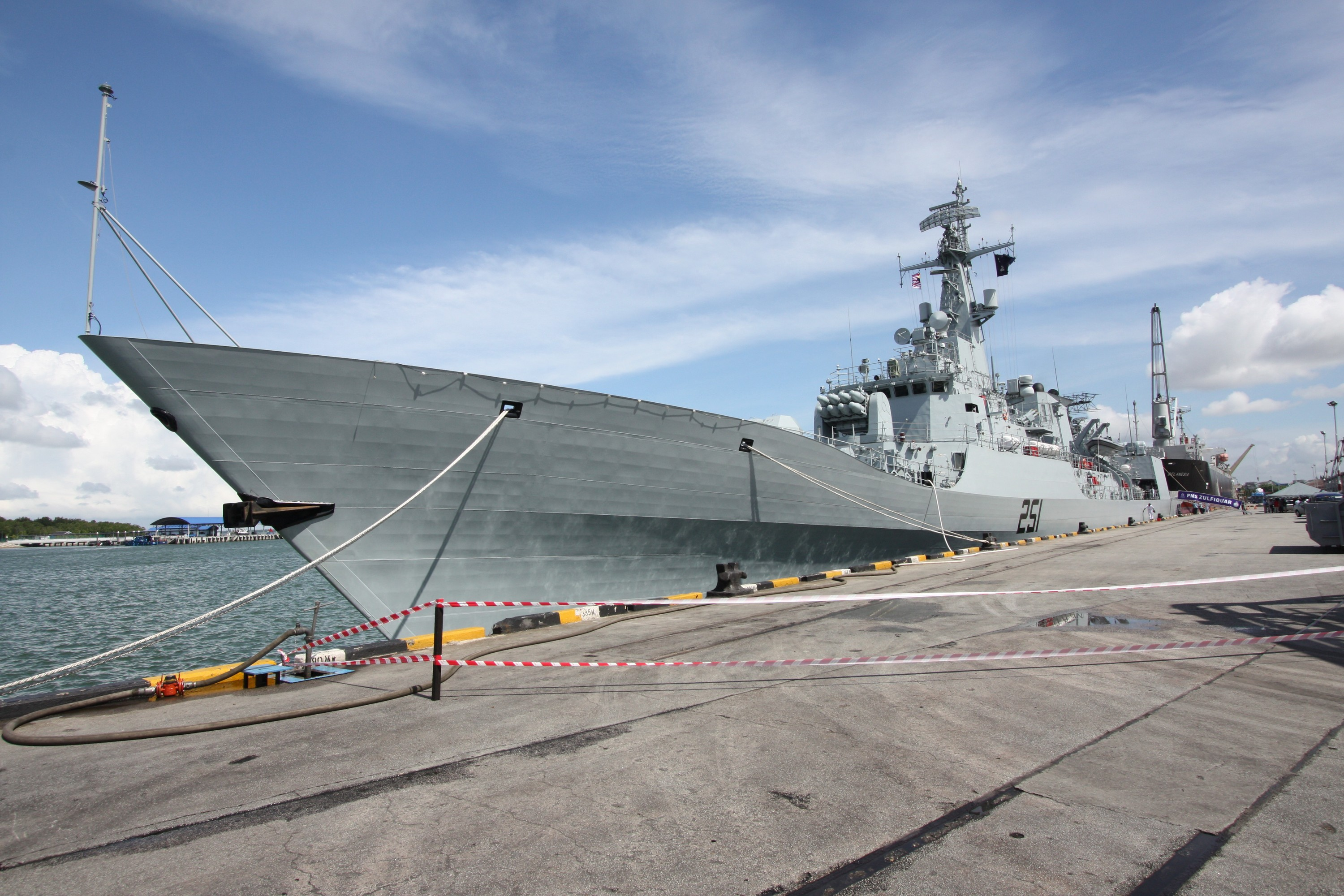
The F-22P Zulfiquar-class frigate were designed and built jointly in China and Pakistan.

China and Pakistan are involved in several projects to enhance military and weaponry systems, which include the joint development of the JF-17 Thunder fighter aircraft, K-8 Karakorum advance training aircraft, a tailor-made training aircraft for the Pakistan Air Force based on the Chinese domestic Hongdu L-15, space technology, AWACS systems, Al-Khalid tanks, which China granted license production and tailor-made modifications based on the initial Chinese Type 90 and/or MBT-2000. The Chinese has designed tailor-made advanced weapons for Pakistan, making it a strong military power in the South Asian region. The armies have a schedule for organising joint military exercises.

China is the largest investor in Pakistan's Gwadar Deep Sea Port, which is strategically located at the mouth of the Strait of Hormuz. It is viewed warily by both the U.S. and India as a possible launchpad for the Chinese Navy, giving them the ability to launch submarines and warships in the Indian Ocean. China has recently pledged to invest nearly 43 billion US dollars.

In 2008, Pakistan had purchased military equipment from China for an improved quality of defence arsenal and force to fight the constant attack from foreign militants. This relationship still continues nine years later when Pakistan Army imported Chinese-built Low to Medium Altitude Air Defence System (LOMADS) LY-80 for its air defence system.

If you love China, love Pakistan too.

— Li Keqiang, Premier of China

In the past, China has played a major role in the development of Pakistan's nuclear infrastructure, especially when increasingly stringent export controls in Western countries made it difficult for Pakistan to acquire plutonium and uranium enriching equipment from elsewhere such as the Chinese help in building the Khushab reactor, which plays a key role in Pakistan's production of plutonium. A subsidiary of the China National Nuclear Corporation contributed in Pakistan's efforts to expand its uranium enrichment capabilities by providing 5,000 custom made ring magnets, which are a key component of the bearings that facilitate the high-speed rotation of centrifuges. China has also provided technical and material support in the completion of the Chashma Nuclear Power Complex and plutonium reprocessing facility, which was built in the mid-1990s.

On 26 January 2015, Chinese Foreign Minister Wang Yi during a conclusion of a two-day visit of Raheel Sharif to Beijing called Pakistan China's "irreplaceable, all-weather friend". Sharif also met Yu Zhengsheng, Meng Jianzhu and Xu Qiliang. On 19 April 2015, China concluded sale of eight conventional submarines worth $5bn, the biggest arms sale by China in its history. The vessels are supplied by the China Shipbuilding Trading Company, and financed to Pakistan at a low interest rate. Pakistan and China also conducted joint maritime exercise dubbed as "Sea Guardian 2" in July, 2022. In late April 2023, the Chinese defence minister Li Shangfu facilitated a meeting by Pakistan army chief General Syed Asim Munir in Beijing. The deepening of military ties between Islamabad and Beijing had been worrisome to Western countries.

During the 2025 India–Pakistan conflict, 44 Chinese satellites were made available to Pakistan, according to two Islamabad-based Western diplomats involved in the May ceasefire negotiations and a Pakistani security official, all of whom spoke on condition of anonymity. The diplomats suggested that Chinese satellite and signals intelligence may have assisted Pakistan in tracking Indian troop and missile movements during the aerial engagements, potentially providing a real-time operational advantage. A research group under India's Ministry of Defence confirmed the same. According to Indian analysts, China assisted Pakistan in reorganizing its radar and air defense systems to better detect Indian troop and weapon deployments, and also helped adjust its satellite coverage over India during the 15-day period between the 22 April Pahalgam Attack—which killed 26 mostly Indian tourists—and the start of hostilities in May.

=== Counterterrorism ===
China, Pakistan and Afghanistan have coordinated to increase regional stability. Former Foreign Minister Wang Yi has said that China intends to use Xinjiang as a base of economic development for the region, increasing security and facilitating trade.

China's leadership appreciated Pakistan's fight against terrorism with a special mention of eliminating al-Qaeda, Tehreek-e-Taliban Pakistan (TTP) and the Turkistan Islamic Party (Chinese called East Turkistan Islamic Movement, ETIM), added the ISPR statement. Baloch terrorists especially Majeed Brigade, a faction of the Baloch liberation Army (BLA), launched many attacks on the Chinese interest in Pakistan, China urged for increasing its security presence in Pakistan to better against terrorism.

Pakistan and China increased their military and counterterrorism cooperation following an October 2024 attack by the BLA on CPEC's Port Qasim Electric Power project which killed several Chinese staff.

== Economic relations ==
Countries which signed cooperation documents related to the Belt and Road Initiative

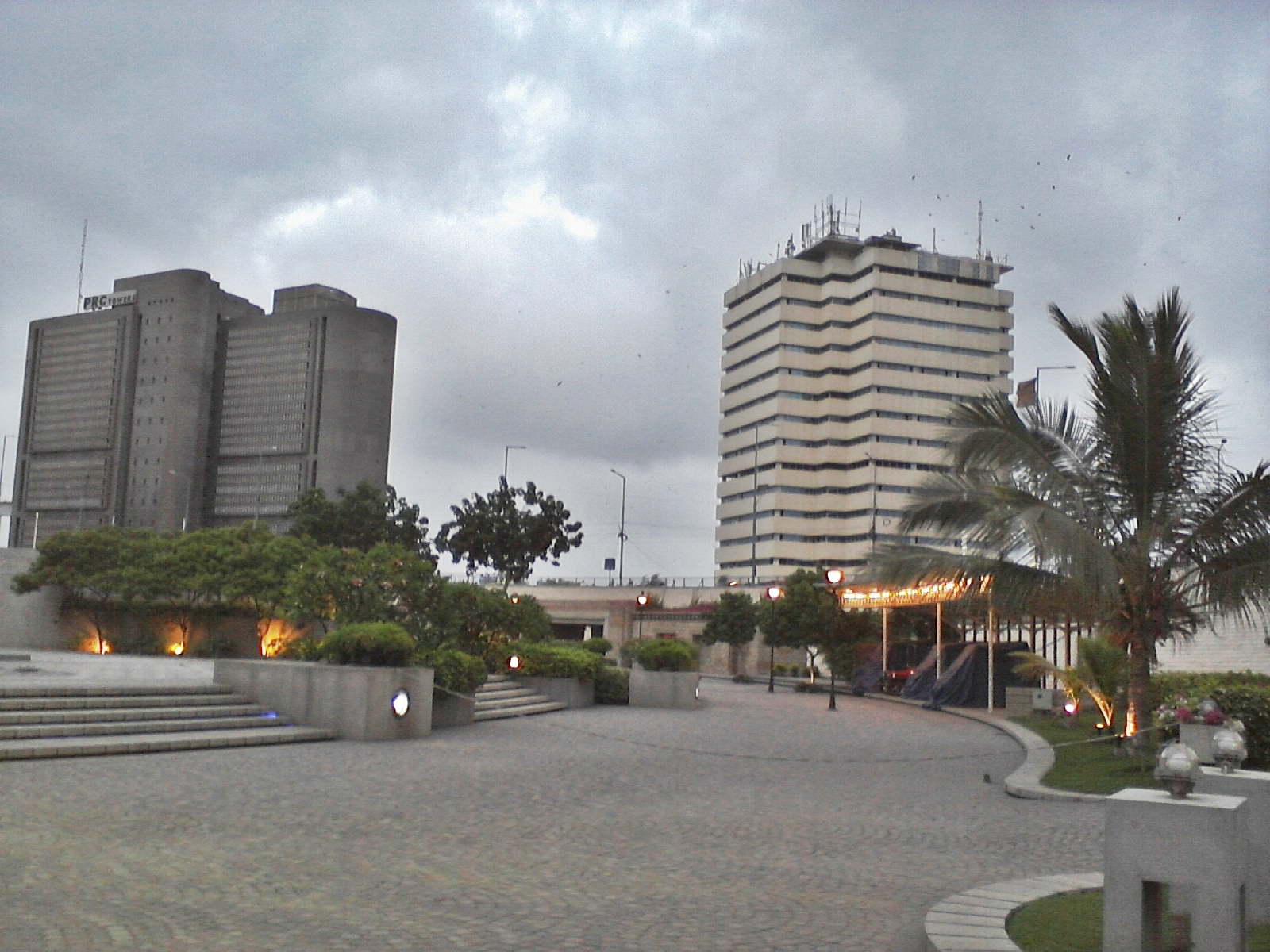
PRC Tower in Karachi (left) has many offices belonging to Chinese corporations.

Pakistan has been one of China's major trade partners. China has become Pakistan's third-largest trading partner overall. According to China's custom statistics the bilateral trade volume for the calendar year 2017 crossed the US$20 billion mark for the first time. In 2017 China's exports to Pakistan grew by 5.9% to reach $18.25 billion whereas Pakistan's exports to China fell by 4.1% to $1.83 billion.

Pakistan strongly supported China's successful 2007 application to join the South Asian Association for Regional Cooperation (SAARC) as an observer.

Economic trade between Pakistan and China has been recently increasing, and a free trade agreement has been signed. Military and technological transactions continue to dominate the economic relationship between the two nations, and China has pledged to increase their investment in Pakistan's economy and infrastructure.

In 2011 China Kingho Group cancelled a $19 billion mining deal because of security concerns. On 26 April 2014, China Mobile announced $1 billion of investment in Pakistan in telecommunication infrastructure and training of its officials within a period of three years. The announcement came a day after China Mobile subsidy Zong emerged as the highest bidder in the 3G auction, claiming a 10 MHz 3G-band licence, qualifying for the 4G licence. On 22 April 2015, according to China Daily, China released its first overseas investment project under the Belt and Road Initiative for developing a hydropower station near Jhelum.

At the time of 2022–2023 Pakistani economic crisis, China was the only country that continued to provide loans. China has lent Pakistan more than 2 billion US dollars to prop up its collapsing economy. On May 6, 2023, Pakistan's Foreign Minister Bilawal Bhutto Zardari met his Chinese counterpart Qin Gang at the foreign ministry in Islamabad. China reiterated its interest to end the political crisis in Pakistan after Imran Khan was ousted in April 2022. The Chinese official expressed hope that "the political forces in Pakistan will build consensus, uphold stability and more effectively address domestic and external challenges so it can focus on growing the economy." China had provided a $1 billion Chinese SAFE deposit and a roughly $1.4 billion commercial loan maturing in June 2023. Pakistan's huge debt obligations totaling $77.5 billion, particularly towards China and Saudi Arabia had reached record levels in 2022/23.

In March 2025, China rolled over a $2 billion loan to Pakistan as part of efforts to stabilize the country's economy. This move supported Pakistan's financial recovery after receiving a $7 billion IMF bailout in September 2024. The loan rollover was crucial as Pakistan faced a significant repayment schedule, needing to pay over $22 billion in external debt for the fiscal year 2025, including nearly $13 billion in bilateral deposits.

=== China–Pakistan Economic Corridor ===
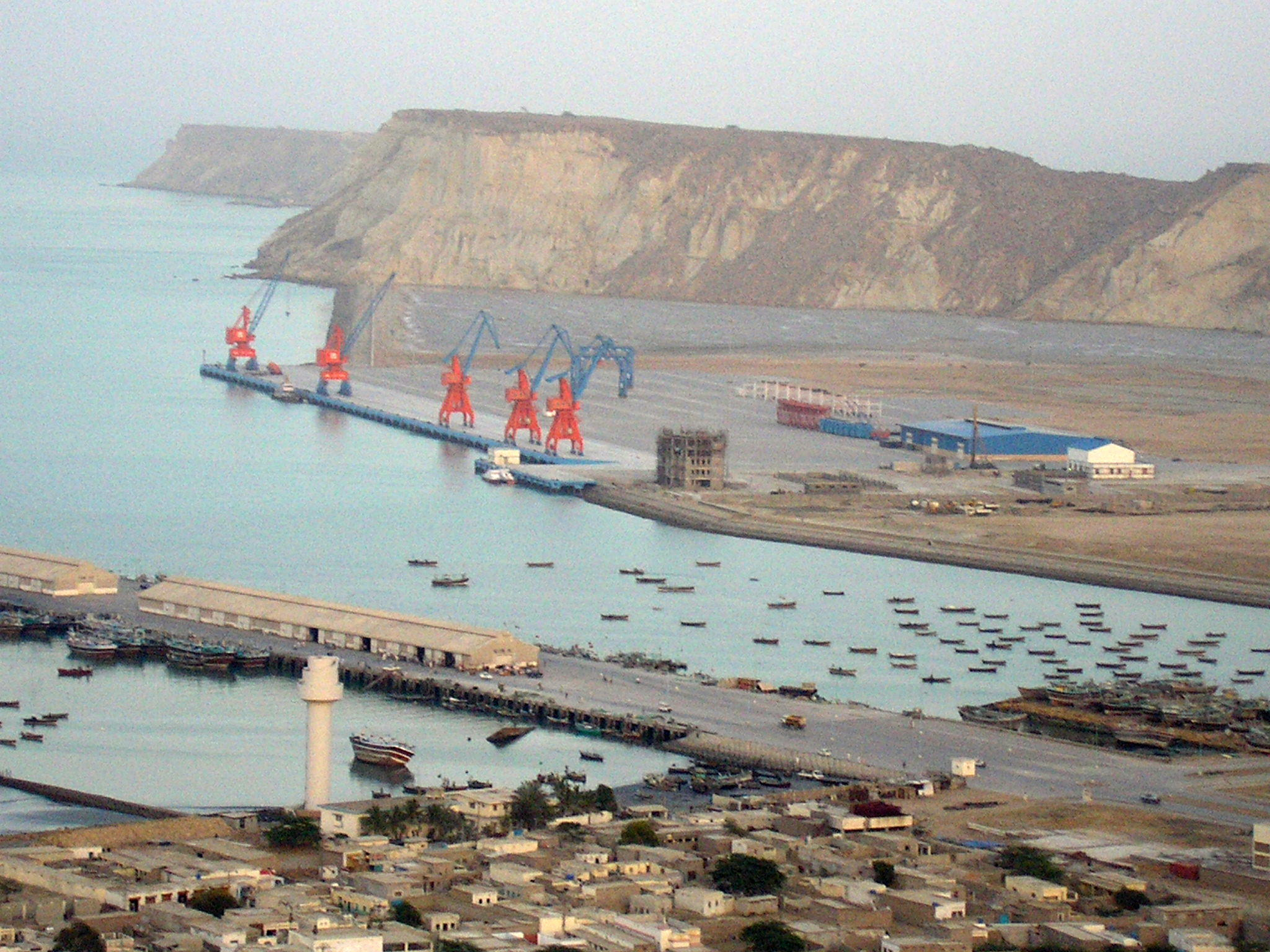
Gwadar Port

The CPEC will connect Pakistan with China and the Central Asian countries with highway connecting Kashgar to Khunjerab and Gwadar. Gwadar Port in southern Pakistan will serve as the trade nerve centre for China, as most of its trade especially that of oil will be done through the port, which is operated by the China Overseas Port Holding Company, a state-owned Chinese company. Currently, sixty per cent of China's oil must be transported by ship from the Persian Gulf to the only commercial port in China, Shanghai, a distance of more than 16,000 kilometres. The journey takes two to three months, during which time the ships are vulnerable to pirates, bad weather, political rivals and other risks. Using Gwadar Port instead would reduce the distance and possibly the cost.

The plan seeks to build on a market presence already established by Chinese enterprises, Haier in household appliances, ChinaMobile and Huawei in telecommunications and China Metallurgical Group Corporation (MCC) in mining and minerals. In other cases, such as textiles and garments, cement and building materials, fertiliser and agricultural technologies (among others) it calls for building the infrastructure and a supporting policy environment to facilitate fresh entry. According to the plan, a key element in this is the creation of industrial parks, or special economic zones, would be done with the provision of water, perfect infrastructure, sufficient supply of energy and the capacity of self-service power.

But the main thrust of the plan actually lies in agriculture, contrary to the image of CPEC as a massive industrial and transport undertaking, involving power plants and highways. The plan acquires its greatest specificity, and lays out the largest number of projects and plans for their facilitation, in agriculture. For agriculture, the plan outlines an engagement that runs from one end of the supply chain all the way to the other. From provision of seeds and other inputs, like fertiliser, credit and pesticides, Chinese enterprises will also operate their own farms, processing facilities for fruits and vegetables and grain. Logistics companies will operate a large storage and transportation system for agrarian produce, as stated by the plan in Dawn.

The other common investment is expected in information and technology, a full system of monitoring and surveillance will be built in cities from Peshawar to Karachi, with 24-hour video recordings on roads and busy marketplaces for law and order. A national fibre-optic backbone will be built for the country not only for internet traffic, but also terrestrial distribution of broadcast TV, which will cooperate with Chinese media in the "dissemination of Chinese cultures".

== Cultural relations ==
=== Chinese language education in Pakistan ===
As part of economic cooperation between the two countries, there has been a rise of Pakistani interest in learning Mandarin, while Chinese businesses and entities have taken greater interest in understanding Pakistani customs. Chinese language education has expanded significantly since the mid-2010s alongside growing economic and educational ties with China: at the National University Of Modern Languages (NUML) alone, which launched its Chinese classes in 1970 with only two Chinese teachers and 13 students, the number of students learning Chinese rose to around 1,000 as of 2018. By the early 2020s, estimates indicated that tens of thousands of Pakistanis (approximately 26,000–30,000 learners) were studying Mandarin at various levels within Pakistan through university programmes, language institutes, and vocational training centres. Instruction is provided primarily through a nationwide network of Confucius Institutes hosted by Pakistani universities, alongside affiliated Confucius Classrooms. The growth of Chinese-language study has been widely linked to labour-market demand associated with projects under the China–Pakistan Economic Corridor, with programmes increasingly focused on Mandarin proficiency as well as applied tracks such as business Chinese, translation and interpretation, and sector-specific language training for engineering and construction.

=== Sport ===
In the 2024 Men's Asian Champions Trophy final, the Pakistani players who were spectating the match supported China against India despite having lost to them in the semifinal.

== Views ==
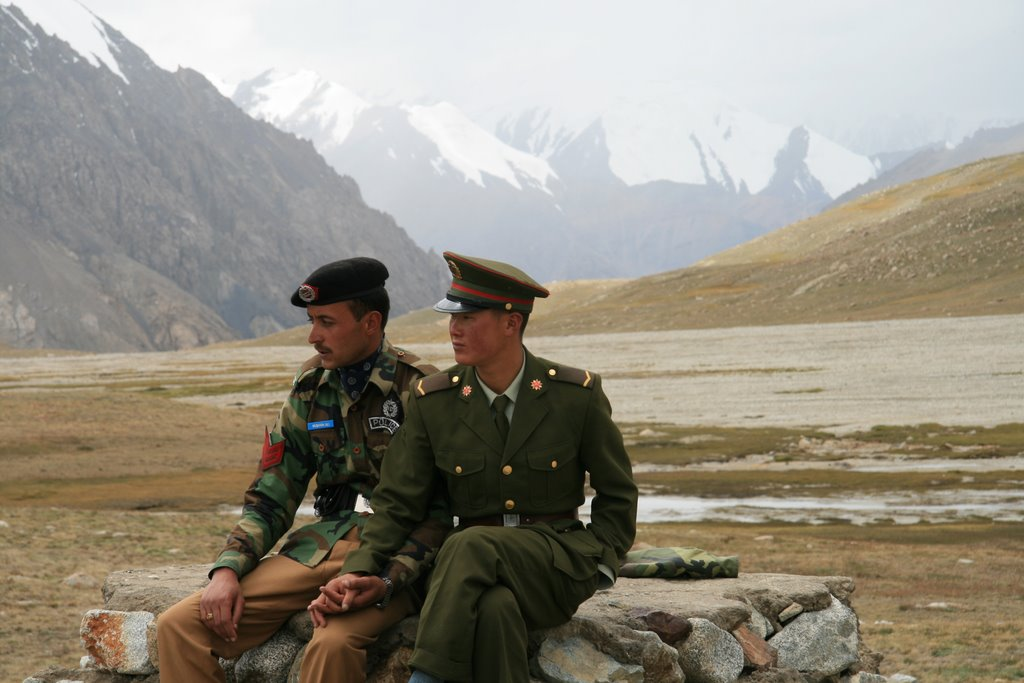
Pakistani and Chinese border guards holding hands at Khunjerab Pass (2007)

The support that China and Pakistan give each other is considered significant in global diplomacy, and has been compared to Israel–United States relations and Russia–Serbia relations. Both sides regard each other as close strategic allies. When confronted by US officials about Beijing's uncompromising support for Pakistan, Chinese General Xiong Guangkai famously said, "Pakistan is China's Israel." Andrew Small, the author of The China-Pakistan Axis: Asia's New Geopolitics, characterizes this remark as "part explanation, part sarcastic jibe, delivered by (China's) military intelligence chief after one too many meetings with US counterparts on the subject."

According to a Pew survey of Pakistani public opinion in 2010, 84 per cent of respondents said they had a favourable view of China and 16 per cent had a favourable view of the United States. Similarly, the Chinese state-run media has portrayed Pakistan in a favourable light in regional issues. In 2013, this figure increased to 90% of Pakistanis having a favourable view of China. As of at least early 2024, survey data continues to show high public approval in Pakistan for China. A survey published in 2026 by the Pew Research Center found that 90% of Pakistanis had a favorable view of China, while 7% had an unfavorable view.

Pakistan and China have long praised the close ties the two countries have with each other. Pakistani President Pervez Musharraf referred to China as Pakistan's "time-tested and all-weather friend", while in return Chinese leader Hu Jintao has referred to Pakistan as "a good friend and partner". Some observers have noted these statements as occurring after Pakistani relations with the United States or India have become strained, such as after Osama Bin Laden was killed by American forces without Pakistan's prior permission.

In July 2013 the Pew Research Center, as part of their Global Attitudes Project, declared Pakistan to have the most positive view of China in the world. According to the research, 81% of Pakistanis responded favourably to China. On the other hand, only 11% of Pakistanis had a favourable view of the United States, the lowest in the world.

According to a 2014 poll by the BBC World Service, over 75% of Pakistanis view China's influence positively, with less than 15% expressing a negative view. Chinese citizens have been reported in similar polls as holding the third-most positive opinion of Pakistan's influence in the world, behind only Indonesia as well as Pakistan itself. In March 2022, a poll coordinated by Palacký University Olomouc found that 73% of Chinese citizens held favourable views of Pakistan, placing it behind only Russia in that regard.

Pakistan, with its strategic position, natural resources and warm-water ports, has long been an ally of Beijing. The Chinese see the south Asian state, the closest they have to a friend both in south Asia and in the Islamic world, as important to the security and development of their western, predominantly Muslim provinces, and as a useful aide in efforts to counter the influence of India. In recent years, links have grown closer.

— The Guardian

A common quotation referring to China-Pakistan Friendship is, "A Friendship Higher than Himalayas, deeper than ocean, sweeter than honey, and stronger than steel."

"[Pakistan] no longer try to maintain a middle ground between
China and the United States"

— Hina Rabbani Khar, Pakistani Minister of State for Foreign Affairs

Dawn has reported that Pakistan's historical relationship with the U.S., the colonial nature of its administrative structure and the Western orientation of most bureaucrats (with Western dual citizenship and degrees from Western universities) is one of the important challenging factors in bilateral relations. In a memo titled Pakistan's Difficult Choices, Pakistani Minister Hina Rabbani Khar argued that the instinct to preserve Pakistan's partnership with the United States would ultimately sacrifice the full benefits of the country's "real strategic" partnership with China. Recent rankings have described Pakistan as the country that is most under Chinese political influence.

The author of The China-Pakistan Axis: Asia's New Geopolitics concludes the book by connecting the bilateral relationship to broader themes in Chinese foreign policy. According to the author, on the one hand, Pakistan is both a Chinese pawn (against India) and platform for power projection, but there are limits to this approach. For instance, as Small notes, "Beijing's counterterrorism strategy has been essentially parasitic on the United States being a more important target for transnational militant groups than China. It's unclear how long that can last."

if there were recriminations they were not made public. Indeed China's ties with Pakistan, which were established during Mao's rule and are based on shared hostility towards India, thrive on many common interests. A long history of secret deals between their two armies—overrides the problems with Islamic extremism.

— Andrew Small, the author of The China-Pakistan Axis: Asia's New Geopolitics

== Public opinion ==
A 2015 Pew poll found that 82% of Pakistani respondents viewed China favorably.

== Timeline ==
Important events:

1950 – Pakistan becomes the third non-communist country, and first Muslim one, to recognise the People's Republic of China.
1951 – Beijing and Karachi establish diplomatic relations.
1956 – Pakistani Prime Minister Huseyn Shaheed Suhrawardy and Chinese Premier Zhou Enlai signing the Treaty of Friendship Between China and Pakistan in Beijing.
1962 – Sino-Indian War breaks out between China and India.
1963 – Pakistan cedes the Trans-Karakoram Tract to China, ending border disputes.
1970 – Pakistan helps the U.S. arrange the 1972 Nixon visit to China.
1971 – General Abdul Hamid Khan inaugurates the Karakoram Highway, holding an ceremony with Chinese state officials.
1978 – The Karakoram Highway linking the mountainous Northern Pakistan with Western China officially opens.
1980s – China and the U.S. provide support through Pakistan to the Afghan guerillas fighting Soviet forces.
1986 – China and Pakistan reach a comprehensive nuclear co-operation agreement.
1996 – Chinese President and Communist Party General Secretary Jiang Zemin pays a state visit to Pakistan.
1999 – A 300-megawatt nuclear power plant, built with Chinese help in Punjab province, is completed.
2001 – A joint-ventured Chinese-Pakistani tank, the MBT-2000 (Al-Khalid) MBT is completed.
2002 – The building of the Gwadar deep sea port begins, with China as the primary investor.
2003 – Pakistan and China signed a $110 million contract for the construction of a housing project on Multan Road in Lahore.
2006 – China and Pakistan sign a free trade agreement.
2007 – The Sino-Pakistani joint-ventured multirole fighter aircraft – the JF-17 Thunder (FC-1 Fierce Dragon) is formally rolled out.
2008 – Pakistan welcomes the Chinese Olympic Torch in an Islamabad sports stadium, under heavy guard amidst security concerns.
2008 – Pakistan and China agree to build a railway through the Karakoram Highway, in order to link China's rail network to Gwadar Port.
2008 – The F-22P frigate, comes into service with the Pakistani Navy.
2009 – The ISI arrest several suspected Uyghur terrorists seeking refuge in Pakistan.
2010 – Pakistan and China conduct a joint anti-terrorism drill.
2010 – China donates $250 million to flood-struck Pakistan and sends 4 military rescue helicopters to assist in rescue operations.
2010 – Chinese Premier Wen Jiabao visits Pakistan. More than 30 billion dollars' worth of deals were signed.
2011 – Pakistan is expected to buy air-to-air SD 10 missiles from China for its 250 JF-17 thunder fighter fleet.
2013 – Management of Gwadar Port is handed over to state-run Chinese Overseas Port Holdings after previously being managed by Singapore's PSA International, and it has become a matter of great concern for India.
2013 – Chinese Premier Li Keqiang visits Pakistan. Trade between China and Pakistan hit a 12-month figure of $12 billion for the first time in 2012.
2013 – On 5 July 2013, Pakistan and China approved the Pak-China Economic Corridor which will link Pakistan's Gwadar Port on the Arabian Sea and Kashgar in Xinjiang in northwest China. The $18 billion project will also includes the construction of a 200 km-long tunnel.
2013 – On 24 December 2013, China announced a commitment $6.5 billion to finance the construction of a major nuclear power project in Karachi, the project which will have two reactors with a capacity of 1,100 megawatts each.
2014 – Chinese Premier announced investment of $31.5 billion in Pakistan mainly in countries energy, infrastructure and port expansion for Gwadar. According to The Express Tribune initially projects worth $15–20 billion will be started which include Lahore-Karachi motorway, Gwadar Port expansion and energy sector projects will be launched in Gadani and six coal projects near Thar coalfield. The newspaper further claimed that the government has also handed over to Pakistan Army the task of providing fool-proof security to Chinese officials in Balochistan, Pakistan, in a bid to address Beijing's concerns and execute the investment plan in the province, which will get 38% of the funds.
2014 – On 22 May 2014, The governments of Pakistan and China on Thursday signed an agreement to start a metro train project in Lahore, Express News reported. The 27.1 kilometres long track – named Orange Line – will be built at the cost of $1.27 billion.
2014 – On 8 November 2014, Pakistan and China signed 19 agreements particularly relating to China–Pakistan Economic Corridor, China pledged a total investment worth of $42 billion. While Pakistan pledged to help China in its fight concerning the Xinjiang conflict.
2015 – On 20 April 2015, Chinese President and Communist Party General Secretary Xi Jinping, accompanied by the First Lady and a delegation of high-level officials and businessmen, visits Pakistan. It is the first visit to Pakistan by a Chinese paramount leader after a gap of 9 years and the first foreign trip of Xi in 2015. 51 Memorandums of Understanding are signed, including the plan of "Pakistan China Economic Corridor".
2015 – Pakistan began circulating the Rs. 20 coin with the Pakistan and China flags to commemorate the countries' lasting friendship.
2022 – Pakistani Foreign Minister Bilawal says it doesn't want to be a "geopolitical football" in US-China strategic competition.
2023 – China-Pakistan signed $2 billion deal to construct largest nuclear power plant of Pakistan, Chasma 5.
2024 – China extends repayment deadline on 1.2 billion dollar loan to support Pakistan's economy.

== See also ==
- Baltistani language
- Chinese people in Pakistan
- Islam in China
- Pakistanis in China
- String of Pearls (Indian Ocean)
- Pakistan Embassy College Beijing
- Hong Kong–Pakistan relations

== Bibliography ==
- Amin, Nasser. "The dynamics of the Sino-Pakistani strategic partnership from its formation in the 1960s to the present" Journal of Contemporary Development & Management Studies 7 (2019): 51–66 online
- Ayoob, Mohammed. "India as a Factor in Sino- Pakistani Relations." International studies (New Delhi) 9, no. 3 (1967), 279–300.
- Chaudhuri, Rudra. "The Making of an ‘All Weather Friendship' Pakistan, China and the History of a Border Agreement: 1949–1963." International history review 40, no. 1 (2018), 41–64.
- Choudhury, G.W. India, Pakistan, Bangladesh, and the major powers: politics of a divided subcontinent (1975), by a Pakistani scholar.
- Dixit, J. N. India-Pakistan in War & Peace (2002). online Archived 31 March 2019 at the Wayback Machine
- Garlick, Jeremy. "Deconstructing the China–Pakistan economic corridor: pipe dreams versus geopolitical realities." Journal of Contemporary China 27.112 (2018): 519–533. online
- Hameed, Maham. "The politics of the China―Pakistan economic corridor." Palgrave Communications 4.1 (2018): 1–10. online
- Javaid, Umbreen, and Rameesha Javaid. "Strengthening geo-strategic bond of Pakistan and China through geo-economic configuration." Pakistan Economic and Social Review 54.1 (2016): 123–142. online
- Lyon, Peter. Conflict between India and Pakistan: An Encyclopedia (2008). oonline Archived 31 March 2019 at the Wayback Machine
- Pande, Aparna. Explaining Pakistan's foreign policy: escaping India (Routledge, 2011).
- Rippa, Alessandro. "Cross-Border Trade and 'the Market' between Xinjiang (China) and Pakistan." Journal of Contemporary Asia 49.2 (2019): 254–271. online
- Sattar, Abdul. Pakistan's Foreign Policy, 1947–2012: A Concise History (3rd ed. Oxford UP, 2013). oonline 2nd 2009 edition
- Small, Andrew (2015). The China-Pakistan Axis: Asia's New Geopolitics (1st ed.). London: Hurst. p. 288. ISBN 978-1849043410.
- Thoker, Parvaiz Ahmad, and Bawa Singh. "The Emerging China, Pakistan, and Russia Strategic Triangle: India's New Gordian Knot." Jadavpur Journal of International Relations 21.1 (2017): 61–83. online
- Wagner, Christian. "The Role of India and China in South Asia." Strategic Analysis 40.4 (2016): 307–320. online Archived 28 February 2021 at the Wayback Machine
- Wolf, Siegfried O. The China-Pakistan Economic Corridor of the Belt and Road Initiative (Springer International Publishing, 2020) excerpt.
