= China–Pakistan Free Trade Agreement =

Trade pact between Asian nations

China–Pakistan Free Trade Agreement
- Type: Bilateral Free Trade Agreement
- Signatories: 2 (Pakistan and China)
- Negotiations for phase one commence: 24 November 2006
- Phase one signed: 7 July 2007
- Phase one concluded: December 2012
- Negotiations for phase two commence: July 2013
- Phase two signed: 28 April 2019
- Phase two ratified: 1 January 2020
- Phase two intended conclusion: 2024

The China–Pakistan Free Trade Agreement (CPFTA) is a free trade agreement (FTA) between the People's Republic of China and the Islamic Republic of Pakistan that seeks to increase trade and strengthen the partnership between the two countries.

Earlier agreements in the economic and trade relationship include the Preferential Trade Agreement (PTA) in 2003, the Early Harvest Program (EHP) in 2006, and the China-Pakistan Economic Corridor (CPEC) in 2015.

== Background ==
The CPFTA has two phases. The initial phase was signed on 24 November 2006, and concluded in December 2012. The second phase was signed on 28 April 2019, and came into force on 1 January 2020. Phase two will conclude in 2024.

The objective of the first phase was to reduce tariffs on 85% of product lines, eliminating them completely on at least 36%. This phase increased bilateral trade between China and Pakistan by 242% between 2007 and 2018. Contrastingly, greater exports from China than from Pakistan caused Pakistan's trade deficit with China to rise from 25% in 2007 to 35% in 2018, or around $13 billion. Phase one also received criticism from domestic producers and business groups in Pakistan. The domestic industry communicated concern about the increased Chinese products competing with domestic producers. Pakistani business groups raised criticism about not being granted effective market access into the Chinese market. Phase two of the CPFTA seeks to address these criticisms, enhance the trade relationship between the two nations, and further liberalise trade. China and Pakistan aim to increase bilateral trade to US$15–20 billion by the completion of the second phase and eliminate tariffs on 75% of product lines.

== First phase ==
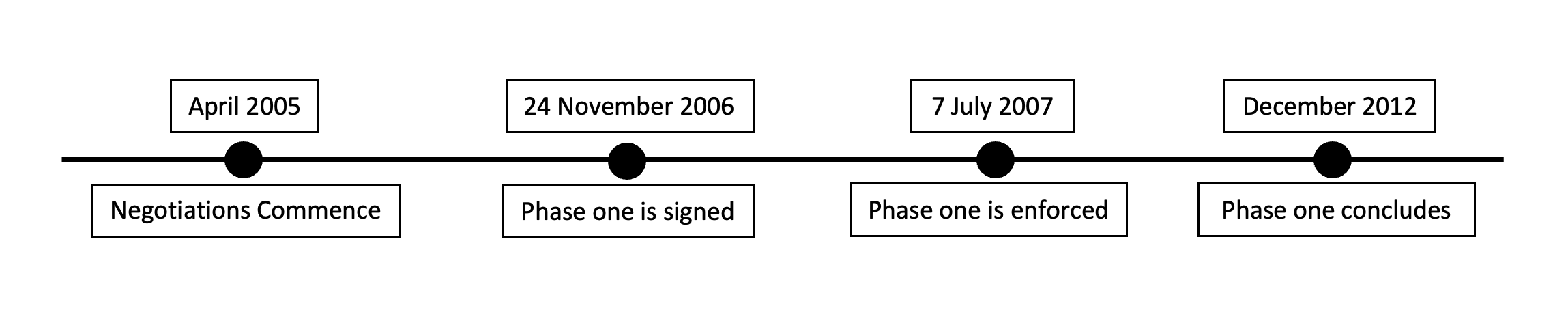
The key dates of the first phase.

In April 2005, the Former Prime Minister of Pakistan, Shaukat Aziz, and the Premier of China, Wen Jiabao, announced the commencement of negotiations towards an FTA. On 24 November 2006, then General Secretary of the Chinese Communist Party, Hu Jintao, visited Pakistan and signed the CPFTA. The CPFTA was enforced on 7 July 2007. The first phase of the CPFTA concluded in December 2012 as negotiations for the second phase began in July 2013. The primary goal of the first phase was to provide tariff concessions on at least 85% of product lines and establish 36% of product lines as tariff-free.

=== Market access in the first phase ===
In the first phase of the CPFTA, China applied tariff concessions on 6418 product lines, and Pakistan implemented tariff concessions on 6711 product lines. Among other products, Pakistan mainly gained duty-free access to goods such as industrial alcohol, textiles, tiles such as marble, sports goods, medical equipment, fruits and vegetables, minerals such as copper and chromium, iron and steel products, and engineering goods. China also implemented a 50% tariff reduction for Pakistan on goods including fishery, dairy products, plastic goods, rubber products, leather articles, and knitwear. China gained duty-free access primarily to machinery, organic and inorganic chemicals, and raw materials. Pakistan also reduced tariffs to the 0-5% range on mainly iron, pharmaceuticals, fibres, electrical equipment, and rayon.

Pakistan also relaxed shareholding restrictions on Chinese investment in the construction, telecom, finance, distribution, health care, environmental protection, tourism, transportation, research and development, and IT education sectors. Chinese service providers will be allowed to hold 60 percent to 99.99 percent stakes in those sectors, in contrast with the normal cap of 40 percent to 51 percent of allowed foreign investment. Fifty-six sectors, including five major sectors in the fields of distribution, education, environment, transportation, entertainment, and sports were opened to Chinese providers for the first time. Chinese investors were also granted access to service markets in sub-sectors such as legal affairs, accountancy, architecture, printing and publishing, veterinary, and more.

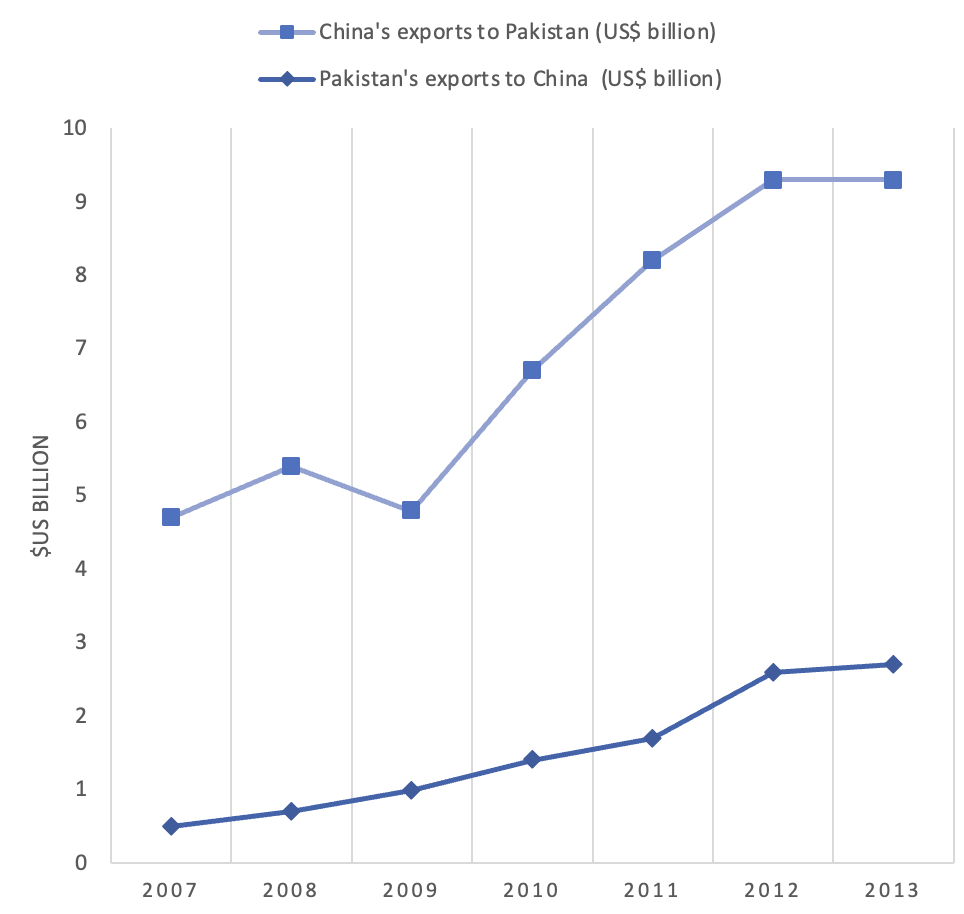
China and Pakistan's total exports under the first phase of the CPFTA (in US$ billions).

=== Economic effects of the first phase ===
After the CPFTA came into force, trade between China and Pakistan grew by 242%. In 2013, bilateral trade between China and Pakistan was above US$9 billion, increasing from their bilateral trade in 2006 of $US3.5 billion. Pakistan's exports to China in 2016 were US$1.6 billion, growing from that in 2006 of US$0.5 billion. Similarly, China's exports to Pakistan also increased, from US$1.4 billion in 2006 to US$12.1 billion in 2016. Following the implementation of the CPFTA, China became the primary supplier for Pakistan in several goods such as organic chemicals, fertilisers, electronic equipment, staple fibres, and footwear. Pakistan became a major supplier to China for gums, resins, and cotton. Tariff concessions under the CPFTA had also allowed Pakistan to import cheap raw materials and machinery from China which is utilised for manufacturing Pakistani products. By the end of the initial phase, China and Pakistan had abolished tariffs on 35.5% of product lines. Owing to more exports from China than from Pakistan, the trade deficit between the nations increased from US$1.4 billion to US$12.1 billion between 2007 and 2018. By 2018 their trade deficit was 35%.

=== Criticisms of the first phase ===
The CPFTA also received criticism from the domestic industry in Pakistan and Pakistani business groups. Domestic producers in Pakistan were concerned over the increased inexpensive Chinese exports infiltrating the Pakistani domestic market, of which the outcome was increased competition for domestic production in Pakistan. Business groups in Pakistan communicated concern about Pakistan not being granted adequate market access for their main exports, such as rice, frozen fish, knitwear, cotton apparel, and leather hides. They described how Pakistan was utilising only 5% of tariff concessions available to them, whereas China was using 57% of their available tariff concessions. Business groups conveyed further criticism about China granting greater tariff concessions to other countries and regions, for example, ASEAN countries within the ASEAN–China Free Trade Area, than it did for Pakistan in the CPFTA. The repercussion of this is that it reduces Pakistan's comparative advantage in its main exports and product specialities.

== Second phase ==
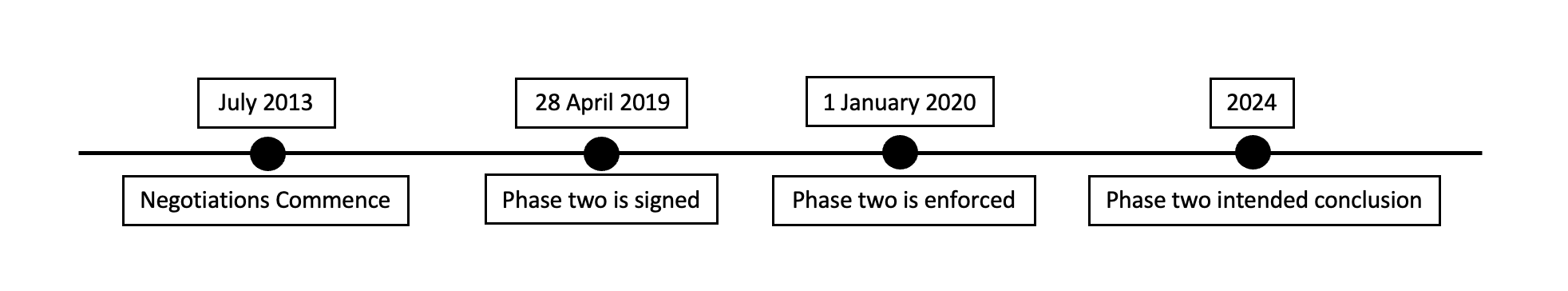
The key dates of the second phase.

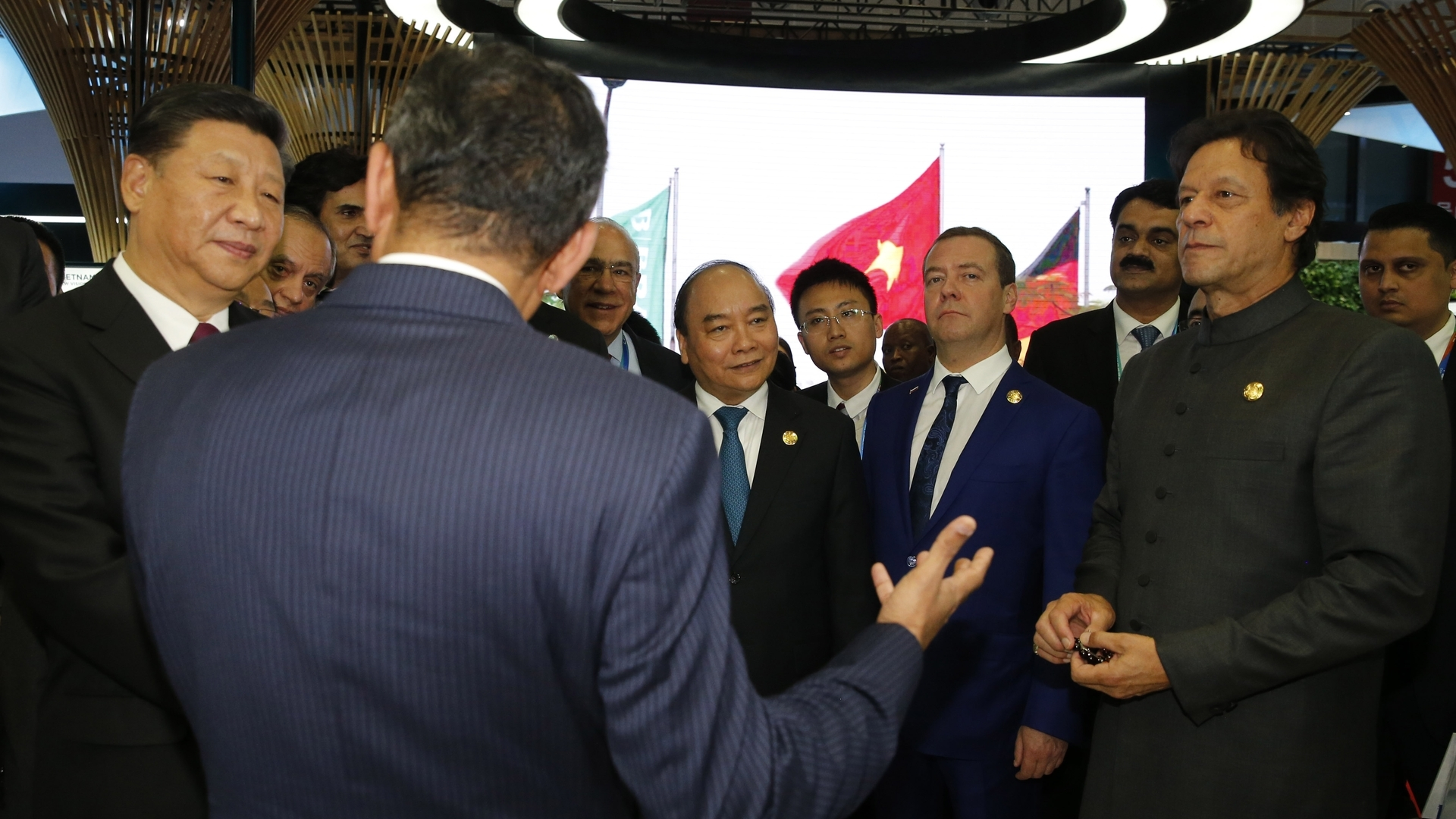
Prime Minister Imran Khan with CCP General Secretary Xi Jinping at the China International Import Expo in Shanghai in 2018.

Negotiations for the second phase of the CPFTA commenced in July 2013. On 28 April 2019, the Prime Minister of Pakistan, Imran Khan, signed the second phase of the CPFTA during his visit to Beijing. Phase two was put into force on 1 January 2020, and will last until 2024. China and Pakistan aim to reach US$15–20 billion in bilateral trade by the completion of the second phase.

The main features of phase two are increased market access for both countries into each other's economies, a list of protected product lines, reformed safeguard mechanisms, a system of electronic data exchange, and a balance of payment clause.

=== Market access in the second phase ===
Phase two of the CPFTA enhances market access for both countries. In the second phase, China has reduced tariffs on 44% more product lines than was previously reduced in phase one. China immediately eliminated tariffs on 313 product lines that Pakistan is a major exporter of, primarily goods such as textiles, frozen meat, and other animal products, seafood, prepared food, chemicals, plastics, oilseeds, footwear, engineering goods, machinery, leather, and auto parts. Pakistan has offered immediate market access to China on products including raw materials, intermediate goods, and machinery. China and Pakistan will reduce tariffs on 412 product lines to 20% within five years. Both nations will also gradually establish 75% of product lines as duty-free, and 93% of product lines will have tariffs reduced to less than 10% in 10 years by China and 15 years by Pakistan. In addition, both parties implemented a 20% reduction in taxes on other products that account for 5% of their respective tax lines. Pakistan will continue to face tariffs of 30% or more on 9 out of the 8238 product lines within the second phase, including rates of 64% on rice products and significant tariffs on fertiliser, sugar, apparel, and wheat.

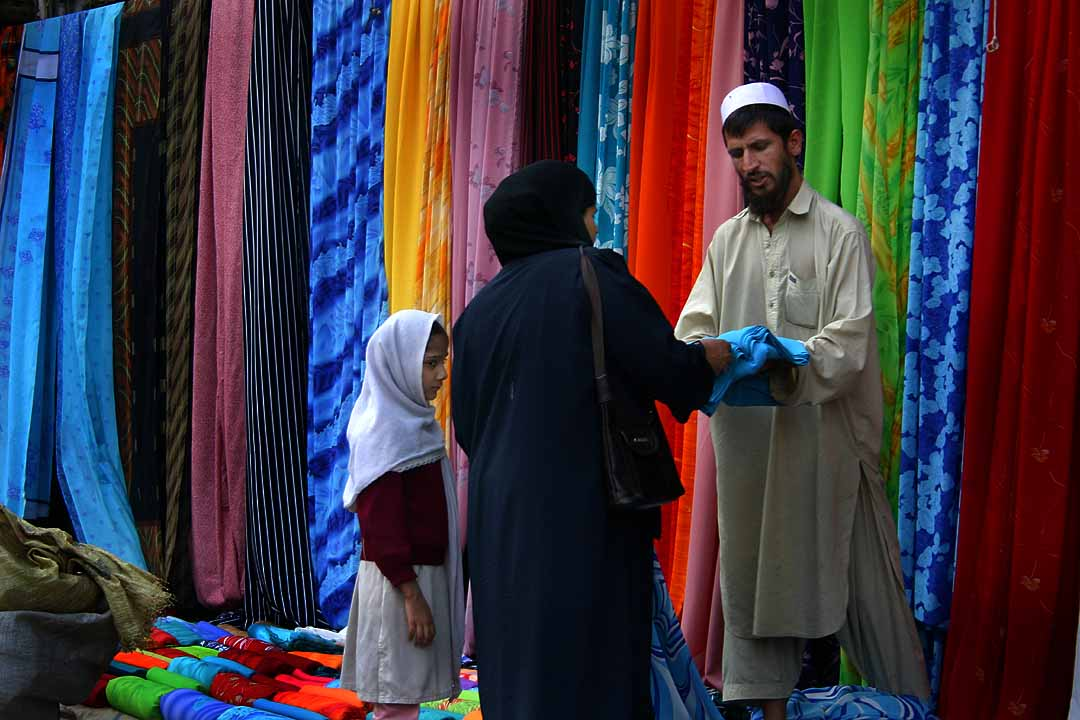
Pakistan's textiles industry is said to benefit from the protected product lines list.

=== Protected product lines ===
China and Pakistan have placed 25% of product lines on the protected list. Among other industries, those that will primarily benefit from this measure include textiles, iron, auto, electrical equipment, agriculture, chemicals, plastics, rubber, paper, glass, surgical instruments, footwear, leather, wood, articles of stones and plaster, and miscellaneous products.

=== Safeguard mechanisms ===
Under phase two, Pakistan and China can increase tariffs on a product or temporarily restrict imports of a product if the good may produce injury or threaten to cause damage to their domestic industries. The initial phase of the CPFTA also possessed safeguard measures, though the second phase has revised them to make them more accessible to better protect the local industries in both nations.

=== Electronic data exchange ===
The second phase introduces a system of electronic data exchange on the trade taking place under the CPFTA, which will help evade misdeclaration and the incorrect invoicing of imports.

=== Balance of payment clause ===
Phase two includes a balance of payment clause as a safety valve against balance of payments difficulties, which can help foresee the threat of a critical decline in the economic assets of either Pakistan or China.

=== Evaluations of the second phase ===
The second phase has generally been well received by business groups and the domestic industry in Pakistan. The Pakistani domestic industry previously raised concerns about the ineffectiveness of the first phase in protecting the local industry from competitive Chinese imports. The second phase has introduced safeguard mechanisms that can more effectively protect the domestic industry in China and Pakistan.

Business groups in Pakistan have also viewed phase two as a marked improvement to Pakistan's market access to China. Under the second phase, Pakistan has received an increased competitive advantage as the nation will face lower tariffs than its main export competitors in China. Pakistan holds a competitive advantage on 80% of the product lines within phase two, including goods such as machinery, mechanical appliances, plastics, steel, and iron. However, on 12% of the product lines under the second phase, including products such as cotton yarn, man-made fibre, garments, vegetables, oils, processed food, and fruit, Pakistan will not be competitive due to high tariffs on these products. Pakistani business groups additionally conveyed that Pakistan will have an increased opportunity for expanding their exports to China in 401 high priority product lines, which includes goods such as miscellaneous edible preparations, cotton, textiles, plastics, vehicle parts, and footwear.

== See also ==
- China–Pakistan relations
- China–Pakistan Economic Corridor
- Free trade agreement
