= The China–Pakistan Axis =

2015 book on geopolitics by Andrew Small

The China–Pakistan Axis: Asia's New Geopolitics
- Author: Andrew Small
- Language: English
- Subject: Geopolitics
- Genre: Non-fiction
- Set in: South and Central Asia
- Published: London
- Publisher: C Hurst & Co Publishers Ltd.
- Publication date: 13 February 2015
- Publication place: United Kingdom
- Pages: 288
- ISBN: 978-0-19-021075-5

The China–Pakistan Axis: Asia's New Geopolitics is a book written in 2015 by the British author Andrew Small that explores the cultural and political relationship between China and Pakistan, with China being described as Pakistan's greatest economic hope and trusted military partner. The book describes the central role played by the China-Pakistan axis in Asian geopolitics, influencing India and Afghanistan following the United States invasion, the threat of nuclear terrorism and the continent's new network of mines, ports and pipelines.

It has been the subject of several articles and columns, including in The Economist, the New York Times, and the Financial Times. The book is published by Hurst Publishers in the United Kingdom and Oxford University Press in the United States.

== About the author ==
Andrew Small is a transatlantic fellow with the Asia program at the German Marshall Fund of the United States, which he has helped lead since 2006. His research focuses on US-China relations, EU-China relations, Chinese policy in South and South-West Asia, and China's role in "problematic" and fragile states. He was based in GMF's Brussels office for five years, where he established the Asia program and the Stockholm China Forum, GMF's biannual China policy conference. He previously worked as the director of the Foreign Policy Centre's Beijing office; as a visiting fellow at the Chinese Academy of Social Sciences, and was an ESU scholar in the office of Senator Edward M. Kennedy. He has testified before the U.S.-China Economic and Security Review Commission and both the Foreign Affairs Committee and the Development Committee of the European Parliament, and his articles and papers have been published in Foreign Affairs, the New York Times, Foreign Policy, and the Washington Quarterly, as well as many other journals, magazines, and newspapers. The China–Pakistan Axis: Asia's New Geopolitics is his first book. Andrew Small was educated at Balliol College, University of Oxford.

== Introduction to the book ==
This book sets out the recent history of Sino-Pakistani ties and their ramifications for Western states, as well as India, Afghanistan, and Asia as a whole. It tells the stories behind some of the most sensitive aspects of Chinese-Pakistani relations, including Beijing's support for Pakistan's nuclear program, China's dealings with the Taliban, and the Chinese military's planning for crises in Pakistan. The book also describes a relationship increasingly shaped by Pakistan's internal strife and the dilemmas China faces between the need for regional stability and the imperative for strategic competition with India and the USA.

== Book reviews ==
Some reviews of this book:

‘…an excellent book.’ — Anatol Lieven, New York Review of Books

‘An impressive account of a little-understood friendship...Six years of research have enabled Mr Small to produce a detailed account of decades of close dealings between the two countries. In that time he won the confidence of many sources in the Chinese army, military intelligence and the security services. Their officials are as tight-lipped as the Pakistanis are garrulous. Yet he managed to loosen them up, at least enough.’ — Economist

‘This fascinating book disentangles the relationship between one of the oddest couples in geopolitics: an unpredictable Islamic republic and a communist state that has turned into a mixture of consumerism and authoritarianism.’ — Rana Mitter, Prospect Magazine

‘It is a work of stupendous research, rich in fresh insights. Extremely well-written.’ — A. G. Noorani, Frontline

‘This unique and timely work provides fresh insights into one of the most important and most neglected new developments in world affairs — China’s turn to south and west Asia. As the U.S. pivots toward (East) Asia, Andrew Small shows us how China is moving beyond traditional concepts of Asia.’ — Barnett Rubin, Senior Fellow and Director at the Center on International Cooperation, New York University

‘Andrew Small’s remarkable book paints a vivid picture of twenty-first century geopolitics by uncovering one of the most important and under-explored relationships. A gripping narrative of how China’s rise meets nukes, terrorists and the Taliban.’ — Mark Leonard, Director of the European Council on Foreign Relations and author of What Does China Think?

‘A ground-breaking book... [Small] has had remarkable access to political, military and intelligence officials in both countries.’ — Nayan Chanda, Times of India

‘The hottest new read in Islamabad.’ — Sherry Rehman, former Pakistani Ambassador to the United States

‘Andrew Small spent years not only interviewing in foreign ministry reception rooms in Beijing and Islamabad but trundling around back streets in places like Kashgar and Gilgit-Baltistan, bearded and dressed like a local, to understand the nature of one of the world's most important and least understood alliances. Promises profound insights into the two countries that (outside the Middle East) dominate American anxieties about future security challenges.’ — Daniel Twining, Foreign Policy

‘The China-Pakistan Axis explores one of the most resilient and paradoxical bilateral relations of the post colonial era — a superb illustration of the manner in which international relations can be determined by power considerations. Pakistan and China have been “all weather friends” for more than fifty years in spite of their ideological differences. Andrew Small shows that their rapprochement resulted mostly from a real political assessment of their common enemy, India, but that non material variables are back in the picture today because of the Islamist connection in the case of the Uighurs, for example. The strength of Small's work lies in its analysis of the fascinating scope and trajectory of the Beijing–Islamabad relationship.’ — Christophe Jaffrelot, Research Director at CNRS, Sciences Po and author of The Pakistan Paradox: Instability and Resilience

‘outstanding new book… Small pulls [the history] together deftly and with meticulous sourcing. But he supplements it with extensive interviews, and these paint a richer picture of Chinese foreign policy in motion.’ — Shashank Joshi, The Interpreter

‘It should be compulsory reading for anyone too carried away by the euphoria of warming U.S.-India ties and tempted to believe China can be nudged out of the picture.’ — Myra MacDonald, War on the Rocks

‘This is an excellent, succinct book, and written with great verve. It is based, as the many pages of notes and references testify, on many hundreds of hours of interviews with key people throughout the region.’ — Kerry Brown, Asian Review of Books

‘An authoritative study of [this] pivotal entente … the book is a wealth of data on a previously under-researched subject … The region's dual axes and their evolving relationships -- India and America on the one hand, and Pakistan and China on the other -- will be central to the global order in our times.’ — Bruce Riedel, Lawfare / Brookings

‘Small’s new book... is particularly significant as it relies on years of research and interactions with officials on both sides of the border, not to mention sound historical research.’ — Alessandro Rippa, China US Focus
