= Siege of Lal Masjid =

2007 armed confrontation in Pakistan

Coordinates: 33.7128°N 73.0870°E

- Part of the War in North-West Pakistan and the war on terror
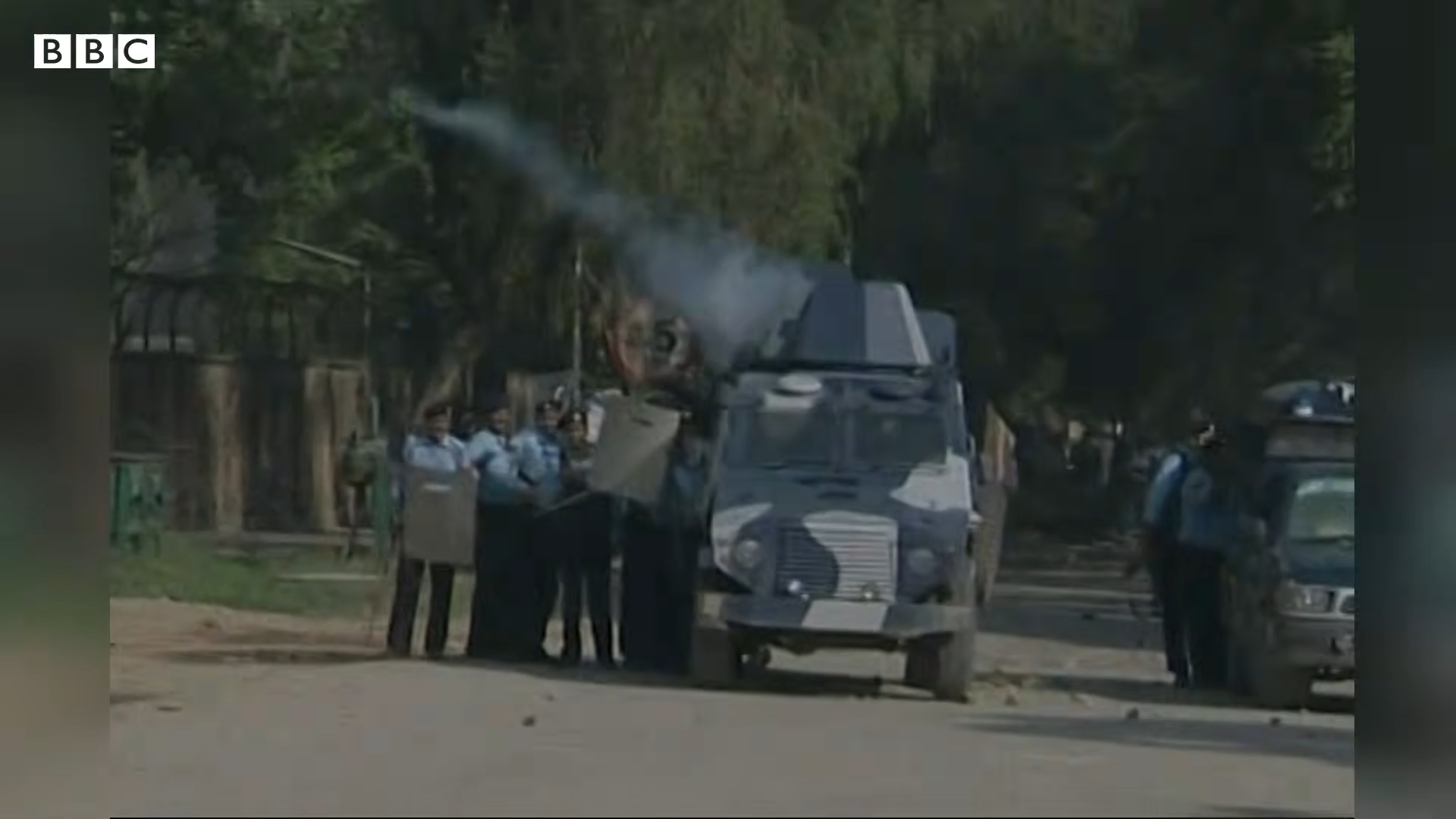
- Policemen fire tear gas near Lal Masjid in Islamabad, Pakistan
| Date | 3–11 July 2007 (1 week and 1 day) |
| Location | Lal Masjid, Islamabad, Pakistan |
| Result | Pakistani Government victory |

Belligerents
| Pakistan | Islamist militia (Note: They referred to themselves as (Urdu: طلباء و طالبات تحریک برائے نفاذ شریعت, lit. 'Students Movement for the implementation of Sharia')) |

Commanders and leaders
| Pervez Musharraf; Shaukat Aziz; Ehsan ul Haq; Tariq Majid (Note: Planned and executed the operation under the direct orders of President Pervez Musharraf, overseeing the majority of the siege.); Masood Aslam; Waheed Arshad; Asim Bajwa; Haroon Islam (DOW); Aftab Sherpao; Ijaz-ul-Haq; Ali Durrani | Abdul Aziz (POW) (Note: The primary leader and instigator of the conflict, but was arrested early in the conflict and later released.); Abdul Rashid X (Note: He was killed during the siege. The Supreme Court of Pakistan later ruled his death an extrajudicial assassination, issuing arrest warrants for Pervez Musharraf and other high-ranking officials for their roles in his killing.); Umme Hassan (POW) (Note: The leader of the female vigilantes referred to as the “burqa brigade”.); Khalid Khawaja (POW) (Note: The military arrested him alleging that he was firing from the mosque. He denied the charges, claiming he wasn't there.) |

Units involved
| Pakistan Armed Forces; Pakistan Army; X Corps; 78th Paratrooper Brigade; XI Corps; 9th Infantry Division; 111th Brigade; Special Service Group; Army Aviation Corps; Bell AH-1 Cobras; Predator Drones; Eurocopter Fennecs; Army Armoured Corps; Al-Zarrar tanks; M113 APCs; Talha APCs; Infantry tanks; Mohafiz APCs; Civil Armed Forces; Riot police; Pakistan Rangers; Punjab Rangers | Lal Masjid militia; Hafsa vigilantes (Note: Sometimes dubbed by the press as the “burqa brigade” or “women vigilantes.”) |

Strength
| 15,000 Army Troops; 164 SSG commandos; 1,200 Paramilitary Rangers | 100 militia members 150 female vigilantes |

Casualties and losses
| 11 killed 44 wounded | 120 killed 50 captured |
- 204 civilians injured

The siege of Lal Masjid (Urdu: لال مسجد محاصرہ; code-named Operation Sunrise initially code-named as Operation Silence) was an armed confrontation in July 2007 between a Islamist fundamentalist private militia and the government of Pakistan, led by president Pervez Musharraf and prime minister Shaukat Aziz. The focal points of the operation were the Lal Masjid ("Red Mosque") and the Jamia Hafsa madrasah complex in Islamabad, Pakistan.

Lal Masjid had been operated by two brothers, Abdul Aziz and Abdul Rashid, while the adjacent Jamia Hafsa madrasah been operated by Abdul Aziz's wife Umme Hassan. They advocated the imposition of Sharia (Islamic religious law) in Pakistan and openly called for the overthrow of the Pakistani government. Lal Masjid was in constant conflict with the authorities in Islamabad for 18 months prior to the military operation. They engaged in violent demonstrations, destruction of property, kidnapping and arson. After a combination of events such as Jamia Hafsa vigilantes taking hostage the Chinese massage parlor's workers and militia members setting fire to the Ministry of Environment building and attacking the Pakistan Rangers personnel who guarded it, the military responded, and the siege of the Lal Masjid complex began. The military response was the result of not only pressure from locals but also diplomatic pressure from China and the United States.

The complex was besieged from 3 to 11 July 2007 and was eventually stormed and captured by the Pakistan Army's Special Service Group. The government reported that the operation resulted in 154 deaths, and the capture of 50 militia members.

The siege had profound and lasting consequences for Pakistan. In its aftermath, the Taliban and their affiliated tribal militant groups in Federally Administered Tribal Areas and Khyber Pakthunkhwa renounced the Waziristan Accord, a ten-month-old peace agreement with the Pakistani government. Following the siege, a wave of militancy and violence swept the country. This began the same month with an event known as the July bombings, the ensuing violence caused over 4,000 casualties in 2008. historians often cite the siege as the catalyst for the intensification of the War in North-West Pakistan. Regarded as one of the longest urban battles in Pakistan's history, the event has also been likened by historians to both the Waco siege and Operation Blue Star.

The siege became a highly controversial event, even within military circles. Senior generals like Jamshed Gulzar Kiani and Asad Durrani criticized the government's handling of the operation, claiming the use of unnecessary force led to a significant loss of life. Meanwhile, officials within GHQ claimed the operation was planned by Tariq Majid under the direct orders of Pervez Musharraf, deliberately sidestepping and without getting the approval for the operation by the Army's General Headquarters and Directorate of Military Operations. The decision was so centralized that, as former federal ministers later confirmed, it was made without consulting the Cabinet of Pakistan.

== Background ==
=== Lal Masjid ===
The Lal Masjid was founded by Muhammad Abdullah Ghazi in 1965 and President Ayub Khan laid the foundation stone for the mosque. In English, Lal Masjid translates to the "Red Mosque", and the name is derived from the red color of the mosque's walls and interiors.

Since its founding, the mosque was frequented by leaders of the Pakistani military and government including prominent Pakistani leaders such as Presidents Ghulam Ishaq Khan and Farooq Leghari, and Prime Minister Balakh Sher Mazari as well as foreign leaders, including Saudi Kings Faisal and Khalid, and Bangladeshi President Ziaur Rahman.

Muhammad Zia-ul-Haq, the Army Chief of Staff who later became president after seizing power in a coup d'état in 1977, was a close associate of the mosque's Imam Abdullah. The mosque is located near the headquarters of Pakistan's Inter-Services Intelligence (ISI), and several staff members were known to go there for prayers. During and after the Soviet–Afghan War, the mosque continued to function as a center for Islamic fundamentalist learning and housed several thousand male and female students in adjacent seminaries.

Imam Maulana Abdullah was assassinated at the mosque in 1998. On his death, his sons, Abdul Aziz and Abdul Rashid, assumed responsibility for the entire complex.

=== Jamia Hafsa ===
Jamia Hafsa is a madrassa for women adjacent to the Lal Masjid. It is considered the largest Islamic religious institution for women in the world, with more than 6,000 students.

It was constructed by Maulana Muhammad Abdullah in 1989. After his assassination, supervision passed to his son Abdul Aziz and his spouse Umme Hassan, while Abdul Rashid ran an institution for boys known as Jamia Faridia. Students were taught general subjects, including mathematics and geography but were not tested on these subjects; the only exams were on religious subjects.

=== After 9/11 ===
Following the 11 September 2001 attacks on the United States, Pakistani President Pervez Musharraf announced his support for the US-led war on terror. This declaration sparked conflict with the Lal Masjid, whose leadership was openly pro-Taliban. Abdul Aziz and Abdul Rashid denied having any links to banned terrorist organizations but were vehemently opposed to the war on terror and the conflict in Afghanistan. They openly condemned Musharraf.

In July 2005, Pakistani authorities raided the mosque in connection with their investigation into the 7 July 2005 London bombings, but the police were blocked by baton-wielding female students. After the raid, authorities apologized for the behavior of the police.

=== 2007 Standoff ===
During the first half of 2007, students and mosque leaders began to challenge the Pakistani government's authority by calling for Islamic law and to end co-operation with the United States.

A confrontation took place when the mosque launched a campaign against the demolition of mosques in Islamabad by the Capital Development Authority. After an illegally constructed mosque was destroyed, students at the Red Mosque's two affiliated seminaries launched an all-out campaign for Shari's and an anti-vice campaign, occupying a nearby children's library and embarking on vigilante raids through the capital to stop what they called "un-Islamic activities," such as DVD vendors, barber shops and a Chinese-run massage parlor that they accused of being a brothel. They blocked authorities from reaching the site and then occupied a nearby children's library building. This was carried out primarily by the female students of Jamia Hafsa. The students set up an around-the-clock vigil and promised a "fight to the death" when the government threatened to evict them. The situation was defused when the authorities opened negotiations. The government later reconstructed the demolished portions of the mosque compound. The Lal Masjid leadership demanded the reconstruction of six other demolished mosques in the capital city.

On 6 April, Imam Abdul Aziz established a sharia court in parallel with Pakistan's federal judicial system and pledged thousands of suicide attacks if the government attempted to close it.

In June 2007, female students from Jamia Hafsa kidnapped three Chinese women from sector F-8 of Islamabad, who they accused of running a brothel, and seized two policemen. All of the women were released after supposedly confessing to running the brothel and were shown on the television wearing burqas. Also due in part to an intercession from the Chinese Ambassador, Luo Zhaohui.

== Timeline ==
=== Siege ===
On 3 July 2007, a battle erupted between Pakistani security forces and students of mosque when law enforcement agencies attempted to besiege the mosque by placing barbwires around the mosque precinct. Riot police fired tear gas to disperse the students leaving nine people dead and approximately 150 injured. Among the dead were four mosque students, a TV news channel cameraman, a businessman, and a pedestrian. Within minutes, security forces closed off the area, and the capital's hospitals declared an emergency. Sporadic clashes continued as Pakistan Rangers paramilitary troops deployed into the area.

On 4 July 2007, authorities announced an indefinite curfew in Sector G-6 of Islamabad, where Lal Masjid is located. The government offered Rs. 5,000 (equivalent to $50 USDs or £41 GBP), plus a free education, to anyone exiting the mosque unarmed. Women inside the mosque were also offered safe passage to their homes. Successive deadlines were extended, as mosque leaders allowed students to surrender. Government authorities announced the first deadline for the occupants of Lal Masjid to surrender unconditionally as 15:30 Pakistan Standard Time (PST), and it was pushed back to 16:00, 18:00, 19:30 and then 21:30.

Before dawn on 5 July 2007, Paramilitary troops set off a series of explosions around the mosque. Gunfire was exchanged throughout the day, but open clashes apparently stopped. Deadline extensions continued on 5 July 2007.

Following the fourth deadline, Imam Abdul Aziz was captured trying to escape disguised as a woman wearing a burqa. Following the capture of this leader, about 800 male students and 400 female students of Jamia Hafsa surrendered to the authorities.

The BBC News reported that Abdul Aziz's younger brother, Abdul Rashid, had been negotiating with a government mediator. He had offered a ceasefire, stating that his followers would lay down their arms if government security forces stopped firing and grant them amnesty. The Pakistani government dismissed the proposal. In a telephone interview from a live transmission of Geo TV, Abdul Rashid denied all the charges against him and reiterated his innocence. He further demanded a guarantee that no harm would come to his followers inside the mosque. He also received a promise that his ailing mother would receive medical care.

The siege continued on 6 July 2007. Negotiation talks continued between the besieged mosque administration and government authorities, without resolution. Twenty-one additional students surrendered to authorities, and two students were killed in a shooting incident.

=== SSG raid ===
On the evening of 7 July 2007, President Pervez Musharraf issued an ultimatum, stating that "those who did not surrender would be killed". The Pakistani army then took over the operation and replaced the Pakistan Rangers paramilitary troops deployed around the premises. In response, the military tasked the elite Special Service Group (SSG) with conducting an overnight raid. Supported by heavy weapons, including artillery, tanks, and armored personnel carriers consisting of M113 APCs and the Al-Zarrar tanks, the commandos advanced on the position and established perimeters on nearby structures, such as the roof of the Islamabad College.

Around midnight at 1:00 am (20:00 GMT), Special Service Group commandos under covering fire from tanks and Cobra helicopters raided the outer perimeter of the compound and were met with heavy armed resistance, the commandos breached and blasted holes through the boundary wall of Lal Masjid and the adjacent Jamia Hafsa.

In response, Abdul Rashid Ghazi accused government forces of causing the deaths of his students during their raid. He claimed that the bombardment led to a wall collapse that killed many of his students including women.

SSG Commander Lt. Col. Haroon-ul-Islam, who had been leading the raid, was wounded and died in the hospital two days later.

=== Preparation for the assault ===
On 8 and 9 July 2007, MQ-1 Predator Drones flew over Lal Masjid and Jamia Hafsa, capturing images of the deployment of people inside. Security forces also had the images taken to study the claims of Abdul Rashid Ghazi regarding casualties and damage caused to Lal Masjid and Jamia Hafsa after the commandos raid.

The aircraft flew over Lal Masjid and Jamia Hafsa for more than an hour, from 2:40 to 4:00 am. Senior government officials and the Security Forces personnel examined the pictures and relayed the information directly to the command post on the ground. The Predators had been given to Pakistan by the United States for use in the war on terror. Strategic planning for the assault on the mosque was conducted based on information gathered by the drone.

Pakistan Army then deployed several of its units to execute the attack on the mosque. These include the Army's 10th Corps and 11th Corps including the 78th Paratrooper Brigade, the Ninth Wing Company and the 111th Infantry Brigade; alongside the army's elite strike force, the Special Service Group; aided by the Rangers paramilitary force; and the Elite Police of the Punjab Police. Interior Minister Aftab Ahmad Sherpao announced at a press conference that the Army confirmed that between 300 and 400 students remained in the mosque, and only 50 to 60 were considered to be armed.

=== Negotiations ===
On the night of 9 July 2007, as a military assault was being prepared, a delegation including politicians Shujaat Hussain and Ijlaz Ul Haq, as well as religious scholars Saleemullah Khan, Mufti Rafi Usmani, Mufti Naeem, Hanif Jalandhari and Fazlur Rehman Khalil, arrived at the Lal Masjid to negotiate a last-minute ceasefire. According to Rafi Usmani, an agreement was reached but was cancelled at the last moment by President Pervez Musharraf, who then ordered the military to launch the assault.

Fazlur Rehman Khalil, one of the mediators, similarly claimed that Abdul Rashid Ghazi was amenable to a peaceful settlement and had been persuaded to agree to the government's demands, culminating in a five-point agenda to end the standoff. Khalil further stated that Ghazi had agreed to surrender and had accepted a peace deal.

Mufti Naeem, one of the mediators and the head of Jamia Binoria, also stated that Abdul Rashid Ghazi had agreed to the government's demands and was preparing to depart the mosque complex when the military operation commenced. Naeem claimed, "We had succeeded in brokering an agreement and everything was agreed upon. We were staying at a house near the Lal Masjid when a military officer approached us and asked us to leave the place in 15 minutes. Soon we heard that the operation had formally been launched."

Jamaat-e-Islami (JI)'s leadership, which had also engaged in separate negotiations with Ghazi, stated that a peace accord was reached whereby Ghazi expressed his willingness to surrender to authorities but was cancelled at the last moment by President Pervez Musharraf.

The military high command then presented President Pervez Musharraf with three options to resolve the standoff: an air strike to destroy the compound, the use of chemical gases to render the occupants unconscious, or a direct ground assault conducted by the Special Service Group (SSG). Musharraf chose the final option and ordered the SSG to commence the operation.

=== The assault ===
External videos
- Stand off continues at radical mosque (Uniform: Punjab Rangers).

On the morning of 10 July 2007, The Pakistani Army issued orders to Special Service Group to storm the mosque and the adjacent madrassah.

Pakistan Army spokesman Waheed Arshad said troops began by attacking and breaching the mosque from the south and assaulted it from three directions at 4:00 am (23:00 GMT). The commandos came under gunfire from behind sandbagged positions on the roof and from the windows of the mosque. The army quickly took control of the mosque and then entered Jamia Hafsa madrasah and according to reports, the troops suffered most of their casualties during this phase of the operation. In close-quarter combat, smoke grenades, incendiary weapons, phosphorus munitions, tear gas and fragmentation grenades were used. It took several hours of intense fighting before the troops gained control of the madrassah with only its basement remaining.

==== Final stand ====
In a last interview with Geo TV during the operation, Abdul Rashid Ghazi, who was hunkered down in the basement, claimed that his ailing mother had been wounded by gunfire and was quoted as saying: "The government is using full force. This is naked aggression ... my murder is certain now." Ghazi also claimed that 30 rebels were still battling Pakistani troops, but they only had 14 AK-47s.

The shootout continued in the basement and according to Ministry of Interior, after being wounded in the leg and called upon to surrender, Ghazi was killed when the firefight in the room intensified. The firefight continued until all the personnel trapped in the basement either surrendered or were killed. Ghazi's sister-in-law, Umme Hassan, was among a group of women who refused to surrender after barricading themselves in a nearby basement; she was injured and subsequently arrested. however Ghazi's ailing mother and nephew, Hassan Ghazi (the son of his elder brother), were killed. Among those killed in the compound were Abdul Rashid Ghazi his mother his maternal cousin Ataa Muhammad Mazari and senior cleric Mufti Inamullah Mazari

=== Complex captured ===
On 11 July 2007, officials reported that the mosque and madrassah complex had been captured and that it took them 36 hours to fully take over the complex.

Behind an army cordon, emergency workers waited for clearance to enter the complex. Female police officers were present to handle female survivors and casualties. Relatives of those inside the Lal Masjid were also outside the cordon. The Associated Press reported: "The siege has given the neighborhood the look of a war zone", with troops manning machine guns behind sandbagged posts and from the top of armored vehicles.

==== Seized weapons ====
According to Inter-Services Public Relations, weapons recovered from the bullet-riddled complex included RPG rockets, anti-tank and anti-personnel landmines, suicide bombing belts, three to five .22-caliber rifles, RPD, RPK and RPK-74 light machine guns, Dragunov Sniper Rifles, SKS rifles, AK-47s, pistols, night vision equipment, and more than 50,000 rounds of various caliber ammunition. Lesser sophisticated items and weaponry recovered from the complex included three crates of gasoline bombs prepared in green soft drink bottles, gas masks, recoilless rifles, two-way radios, large plastic buckets containing homemade bombs the size of tennis balls, as well as knives.

Some journalists questioned why the militia did not employ their heavy weapons as a last resort. Furthermore, despite being in possession of anti-personnel and anti-tank mines, there were no confirmed reports of their use in the conflict.

The cache of seized arms later disappeared from the heavily guarded treasury of a nearby police station. In response, Rehman Malik, the Minister of Interior, ordered the suspension of multiple police officials connected to the security breach. The suspended personnel included the Senior Superintendent of Police (SSP), the Station House Officer (SHO), and fourteen other officers.

== Casualties ==
Officials in Islamabad considered the operation a success, citing that they were able to subdue all the fighters inside the mosque without a heavy civilian toll. "The number of casualties was much lower than it could have been," said Shaukat Aziz, Pakistan's prime minister. Of the 164 Special Services Group Army commandos that participated in the siege and later assault of the mosque, 10 died and 33 were wounded.

The Inspector General of Police reported that from 3 July until 11 July 2007, 1,096 people left from the complex. The inspector also confirmed that 102 people were killed during the operation: 91 militia members, 10 Special Service Group commandos, and 1 paramilitary ranger. This includes the sixteen dead on 10 July 2007. A total of 248 people were injured, including 204 civilians, 41 army soldiers, and 3 Rangers. Seventy-five bodies were recovered from the premises after the operation.

Nineteen bodies were burned beyond recognition according to Pakistani officials. An article in The Nation, cited a grave digger at the cemetery where the bodies were being buried, who claimed there was the possibility that there may have been more than one body in each coffin. The article also stated that the government was digging more graves than previously established. The Muttahida Majlis-e-Amal, a coalition of religious parties, claimed that between 400 and 1,000 students had been killed, along with women and children. Spanish-language news channels Univision, Antena 3, and Telecinco claimed that the total number of deaths in the siege was greater than 286 and could be as high as 300.

The seventy bodies from the Lal Masjid were buried in a graveyard near Islamabad. To assist relatives in identifying and in claiming the bodies later, officials took photographs, fingerprints, and DNA samples from the bodies prior to their interment in temporary graves.

=== Damage to the complex ===
The damage to the mosque was extensive. The entrance hall was completely burned out, the ceiling scorched, and the red walls above the oval doorway blackened. However, the mosque itself sustained less damage than the Jamia Hafsa seminary. Bullet casings were found all over the mosque roof, and the inside of Lal Masjid was turned coal black. the minarets were completely destroyed. The dome, however, was not damaged during the 36-hour battle.

In the Jamia Hafsa complex, damage was extensive, with thousands of bullet holes in the courtyard. The basement was blackened from rockets. The main buildings of the complex were structurally intact, but the boundary walls had been breached in several places. The building had bullet marks in its cement structure. The two courtyards inside the school were filled with shattered glass and spent rounds. Piles of the girls' bed rolls and stacks of books were piled against walls.

== Reactions ==
External videos
- Reactions to government action against mosque, security, voxpops (Uniform: Punjab Rangers).

=== Pakistani Government ===
In a televised address to the nation, Musharraf declared that he was determined to eradicate extremism and terrorism and vowed that he would "crush extremists throughout Pakistan and move against religious schools like those at the Lal Masjid and those that breed them."

Information Minister Tariq Azim said that the Lal Masjid assault had sent a strong message that the government "meant business."

=== Pakistani Military ===
Lieutenant General Jamshed Gulzar Kiani demanded inquiry into the assault on the mosque and claimed that white phosphorus bombs were used in the assault. In a later confirmation, Federal Minister for Religious Affairs Ijaz-ul-Haq stated that troops had indeed used phosphorus munitions during the military action.

Director General of the Inter-Services Intelligence, Asad Durani In his book The Spy Chronicles, characterized the Lal Masjid operation as a "disaster," criticizing the authorities for its handling. He contends that the assault led to the burning of the complex and a significant loss of life, including many women and children.

Lieutenant colonel Inamur Rahim claimed that Ghazi had agreed to the government's demands but was killed regardless during the operation.

=== International ===
U.S. President George W. Bush gave his support to Musharraf as "a strong ally in the war against these extremists." State Department deputy spokesman Tom Casey noted that the militants had been given many warnings before the commandos moved on the Red Mosque. He said: "The government of Pakistan has proceeded in a responsible way. All governments have a responsibility to preserve order."

Government of China backed Musharraf in his stand against Lal Masjid. The Chinese Minister of Public Security, Zhou Yongkang, referred explicitly to the Lal Masjid militants as terrorists and demanded that Pakistan act more forcefully to protect Chinese nationals working in the country.

Bryan David Hunt, of the United States' consulate in Lahore, was quoted as saying that the U.S. government supported the Pakistani government and that "the militants were given many warnings but instead of surrendering they decided to fight and challenge the writ of government." Hunt also said that the U.S. fully supported Pakistan in their war on terror and considers Pakistan "their closest ally in South Asia." Religious parties and figures criticised the support extended by the U.S. consular official and demanded that the government expel him for interfering in Pakistan's internal affairs. A Pakistani Foreign Office spokesperson Tasneem Aslam characterized the U.S. consulate official's statement as contrary to diplomatic norms, and open interference in the country's internal affairs. She said a protest would be lodged.

The European Union President, José Manuel Barroso, issued a statement that it "supports the Government of Pakistan in the defense of the rule of law and the writ of the State against the threat posed by such armed radical groups in the context of the fight against extremism." The EU also praised the "restraint and moderation showed by the Pakistani authorities."

Al-Qaeda's Osama bin Laden issued a videotape titled "Come to Jihad". In the message, bin Laden stated that "twenty years after the soil of Pakistan soaked up the blood of one of the greatest jihadi fighters, the Imam Abdallah Azzam, today Pakistan is witness to the death of another great Muslim, Imam Abdul al-Rashid Ghazi and we in al-Qaeda call on Allah to witness that we will retaliate for the blood of Imam Abdul al-Rashid Ghazi. his second-in-command, al-Zawahiri, also issued a videotape, calling for Pakistanis to join jihad in revenge for the attack by the Pakistan's Army on the mosque. Al-Zawahiri's four-minute address was titled "The Aggression against Lal Masjid" and dedicated solely to the clash between the Lal Masjid and the Pakistan Army. The video was released by al-Qaeda's media wing as-Sahab and subtitled in English.

The PML-N general secretary in exile stated that Pervez Musharraf was responsible for the country's difficult situation, citing the military operations in Bajaur, Waziristan, and Lal Masjid as misguided.

=== Media ===
The Dawn supported the government's actions against Lal Masjid but questioned "how the intelligence agencies failed to get wind of the goings-on in the Lal Masjid and the stockpiling of arms and ammunition in such large quantities."

The Daily Times also supported the government's position and added: "Let us be clear. No government can violate the universal principle of 'no negotiation with terrorists' and live to be praised." The News was more critical, stating: "Once 'Operation Silence' is over, the firing stops, the dust settles down and the bodies are counted, there are bound to be many questions raised. Why didn't the government take action earlier against the clerics because had that been the case so many lives would not have been lost? Why were the Lal Masjid elements allowed so much leeway that the complex became almost like a state within a state, complete with a moral policing force which acted with impunity enforcing a rigid interpretation of Islam on the city's residents? How did so many hardened militants, reportedly some foreigners among them, make their way inside the compound situated in the heart of Islamabad?".

The Post was worried about how the episode would affect Pakistan: "This is going to ratchet up religious sentiments, and could lead to increased polarization between the moderates and extremists in the country, the former including General Musharraf under the banner of 'enlightened moderation'."

The Islam newspaper criticized the government, stating: "The government cannot absolve itself of the tragedy. If it wanted, the matter could have been resolved at the start. But this was not done and, for the first time in the history of Pakistan, our own security forces not only bombarded a mosque and religious seminary, but also brought in armored personnel carriers, tanks and helicopter gunships in numbers that made you wonder. This shows that all this activity was masterminded by some Satanic minds. This incident is tragic, shameful and dangerous. How much it has harmed the country and the nation, and how worse an impact it will leave on the country on the future, can at this point only be imagined."

Nawa-i-Waqt wrote in its editorial: "The entire nation is drowned in shock and grief today. They are mourning the brute use of force. Now we need a comprehensive inquiry over the operation against the Red Mosque. The report should be made public so that the people can know the actual facts."

The Ausaf daily countered, "The entire nation is grieving ... only the United States wanted what happened and proof of that is that the storming operation was celebrated at the White House and Pentagon rather than at General Musharraf's headquarters."

The Pakistan Observer praised the government: "The Government deserves credit for showing remarkable tolerance and patience and exhausted all possible avenues for peaceful settlement of the nerve-shattering crisis".

The president of the Lahore High Court Bar Association, said, "This issue could have been resolved through negotiations but General Musharraf intentionally spilled the blood of innocent people to please his foreign masters."

== Aftermath ==
The siege gave hardliners in Pakistan a rallying point, as well as generating new martyrs (i.e. volunteers to commit suicide bombings) and prompting al-Qaeda, Jaish-e-Muhammad, Lashkar-e-Jhangvi, and the Taliban to launch retaliation attacks in Pakistan. In the next five months suicide bombers committed 56 attacks killing 2729 Pakistanis. This event also broke the "long standing alliance" between the Deobandi jihadists and the Pakistani military.

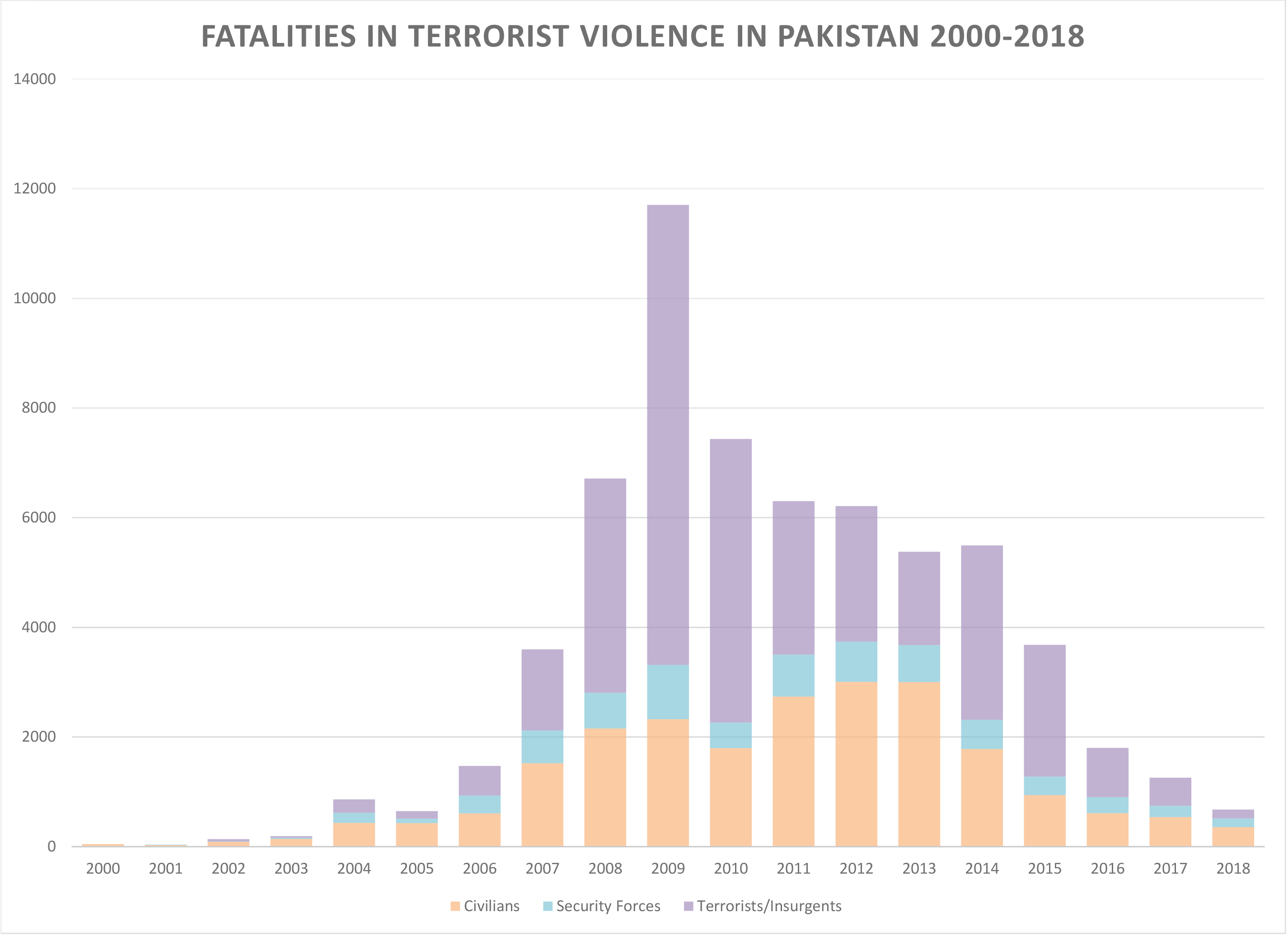
Graph depicting a sharp increase in militant violence in Pakistan beginning in 2007, following the siege.

The first attack after the operation against the mosque was on 12 July 2007; two suicide attacks killed six people in northwest Pakistan. Another 28 soldiers were killed when a suicide attacker struck a military convoy in Waziristan near the Afghan border on 14 July.

According to journalist Deborah Scroggins, the storming of the masjid "became a turning point for Pakistan. ... Many of the militant Pakistanis in Waziristan and on the border with Kashmir had had young relative in the shattered mosque, and they began attacking the army in revenge."

=== Controversy over authorization ===
According to a November, 2010, report in The News International, which cited a retired military official at General Headquarters (GHQ), the planning for the operation was conducted by General Tariq Majid, under the direct instructions of Pervez Musharraf. The same sources claimed that the GHQ and its Military Operations Directorate were not involved in the planning process. The report further stated that following the death of Haroon-ul-Islam, the first SSG casualty in the siege, Musharraf convened a meeting of top military authorities. In this meeting, he expressed his determination that a full-fledged military operation must be carried out. A senior GHQ official present at the meeting reportedly advised against this course of action, urging Musharraf to reconsider due to the potential for significant loss of life and suggesting that an option to surrender be offered to those inside the mosque complex. Despite this counsel, sources alleged that Musharraf dismissed the concerns and subsequently assigned the operation to military without formal clearance from the GHQ or JS HQ. According to another report citing an anonymous retired general, the decision to launch the military operation was made unilaterally by Musharraf, overcoming internal resistance. The general further claimed that the action was executed by the X Corps and the IV Corps under General Tariq Majeed, utilizing the 111th Infantry Brigade and the Special Service Group (SSG), and was conducted without consulting the Army's General Headquarters or the Directorate of Military Operations.

Subsequent revelations by former federal ministers indicated that the decision to launch the operation was made without seeking cabinet approval. The cabinet reportedly remained uninformed about both the planning and execution of the military action.

=== Demolition of Jamia Hafsa ===
On July 26, 2007, the Jamia Hafsa seminary and an adjacent children's library were demolished by authorities after being declared structurally unsafe. The decision followed an assessment by the National Engineering Services of Pakistan and the Pakistan Engineering Council, which found the buildings had sustained heavy damage during the conflict. The Lal Masjid mosque itself was not demolished.

In 2011, an agreement was signed between the Islamabad Administration and the management of Lal Masjid. The agreement allocated 20 kanals of land in Islamabad's Sector H-11 for the construction of Jamia Hafsa, as compensation for its previous madrassa building, which had been demolished.

=== Reopening of Mosque ===
The mosque was repaired by the Capital Development Authority (CDA) and officially reopened for congregational prayers in October 2007. As part of the initial repairs, the CDA altered the building's appearance by adopting a beige and white color scheme and lowering its fortified boundary walls. A second, more extensive renovation was carried out in 2009 by Bahria Town, which restored the mosque and implemented a new design.

=== 2008 bombing ===
On 6 July 2008, at 7:50 pm local time, a bomb exploded near Lal Masjid killing 18 policemen and a civilian. Pakistani officials claim that the bombing, which occurred on the first anniversary of the siege, was a revenge attack and the work of a 30-year-old suicide bomber.

=== Release of Imam ===
On 16 April 2009, the Supreme Court of Pakistan ordered the release of the mosque's chief cleric, Mawlana Abdul Aziz, who subsequently resumed his preaching duties at the mosque.

=== Al Jazeera documentary ===
External videos
- Inside the Red Mosque (Al Jazeera English).

In August 2007, Al Jazeera English aired a documentary titled Witness- Inside the Red Mosque, featuring reporter Rageh Omaar. The film was nominated for an International Emmy Award in 2008.

== Legal Proceedings ==
=== Supreme Court Suo motu notice ===
On 16 August 2007, acting on a suo motu notice, the Supreme Court of Pakistan took up the extrajudicial killings of the people at the Lal Masjid and Jamia Hafsa complex. Performance of the Islamabad administration attracted the reprimand of the court for its slow pace. The court was informed that 61 students were in custody, of whom 39 were on bailable offences. The Chief Justice of Pakistan ordered immediate release of 20 people considered innocent, as recommended by a joint investigation team. National Crisis Management Cell Director Javed Iqbal Cheema told the court that 28 DNA tests had not been confirmed. The Chief Justice also pointed out that Islamabad Deputy Commissioner Mohammad Ali had stated that 30 bodies remained unidentified.

=== Ghazi Murder Case ===
In September 2013, a first information report (FIR) was registered against Pervez Musharraf by Islamabad High Court for his role in the siege and the assassination of Abdul Rashid Ghazi.

In October 2013, Musharraf was arrested, days after being bailed on other charges, for being personally responsible for ordering the siege.

In February 2016, a local courts judge issued non-bailable warrants for the arrest of Musharraf for his 'deliberate' absence from the proceedings of the murder case of Lal Masjid cleric Abdul Rashid Ghazi.

=== Supreme Court Commission ===
In 2012, the Supreme Court of Pakistan established a judicial commission to investigate the siege. The commission's mandate was to examine the legality of the military action and the high number of civilian casualties, including the death of Abdul Rashid Ghazi.

A three-member bench, headed by Chief Justice Iftikhar Muhammad Chaudhry, was formed to oversee the case.

== See also ==
- Waco siege, similar event in the United States
- Operation Blue Star, similar event in India
- Battle of Rafah (2009), similar event in Gaza Strip
- Grand Mosque seizure, similar event in Saudi Arabia
- August 2013 Rabaa massacre, similar event in Egypt
- Memali Incident, similar event in the Malaysia
