= Tariq Majid =

Pakistani general

Tariq Majid NI(M) HI(M) LoH
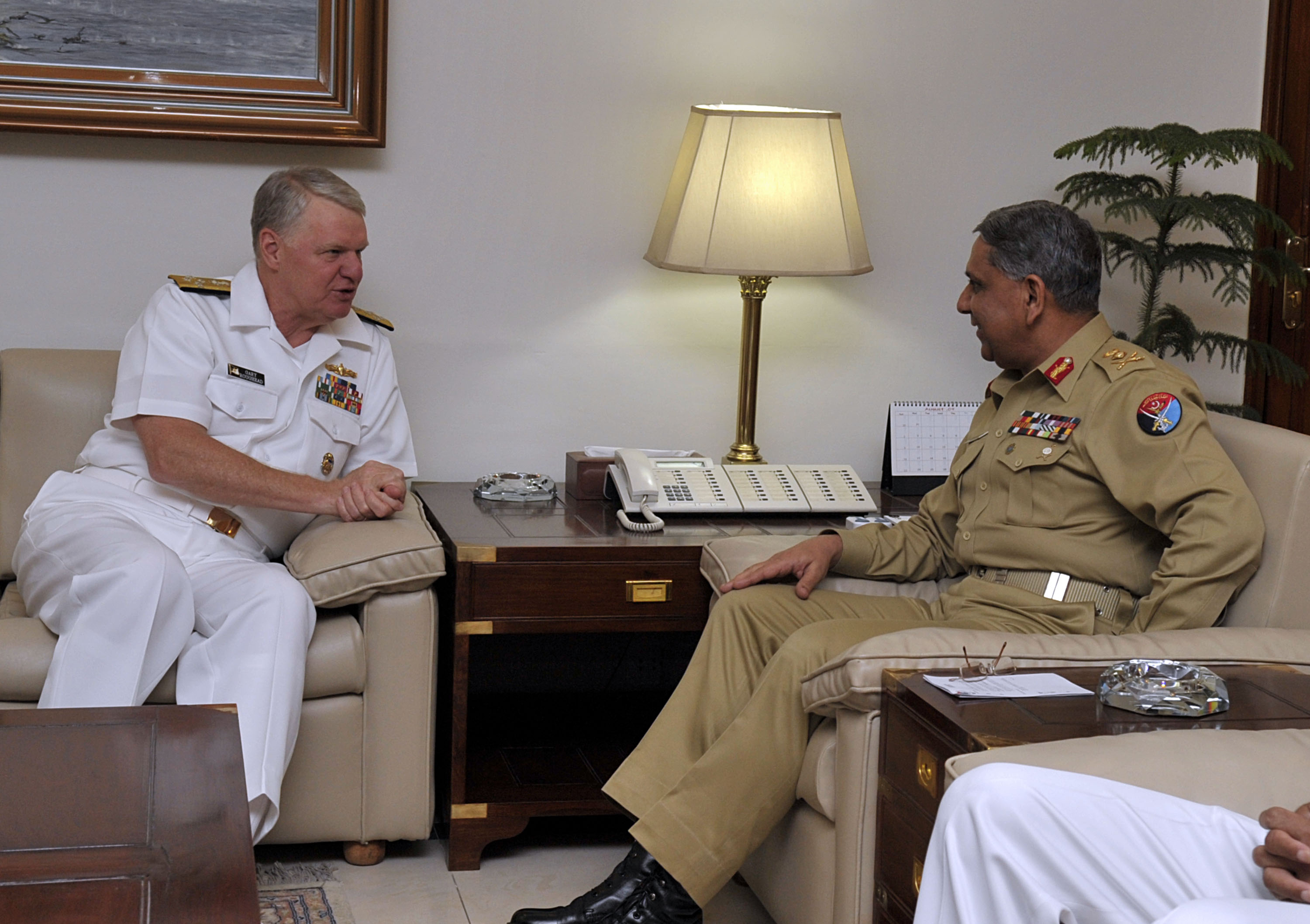
- General Tariq Majid (right) meeting with United States Navy's CNO Admiral Gary Roughead at Joint Staff Secretariat (JSS).

Chairman of the Joint Chiefs of Staff Committee
- In office 8 October 2007 – 8 October 2010
- Preceded by: Gen. Ehsan ul Haq
- Succeeded by: Gen. K. Shameem Wynne

Personal details
- Born: Tariq Majid; August 23, 1950 (age 76) Lahore, Punjab Province, Pakistan
- Education: Pakistan Military Academy
- Nickname: Fire

Military service
- Allegiance: Pakistan
- Branch/service: Pakistan Army
- Years of service: 1970–2010
- Rank: General
- Unit: 28th Battalion, Baloch Regiment
- Commands: X Corps in Rawalpindi; Chief of General Staff (CGS); DG Military Intelligence (DGMI); 10th Infantry Division in Lahore 28 Baloch Regiment
- Battles/wars: Indo-Pakistani War of 1971; Indo-Pakistani standoff of 2001; War in North-West Pakistan; Siege of Lal Masjid; Indo-Pakistani standoff of 2008; War in Afghanistan
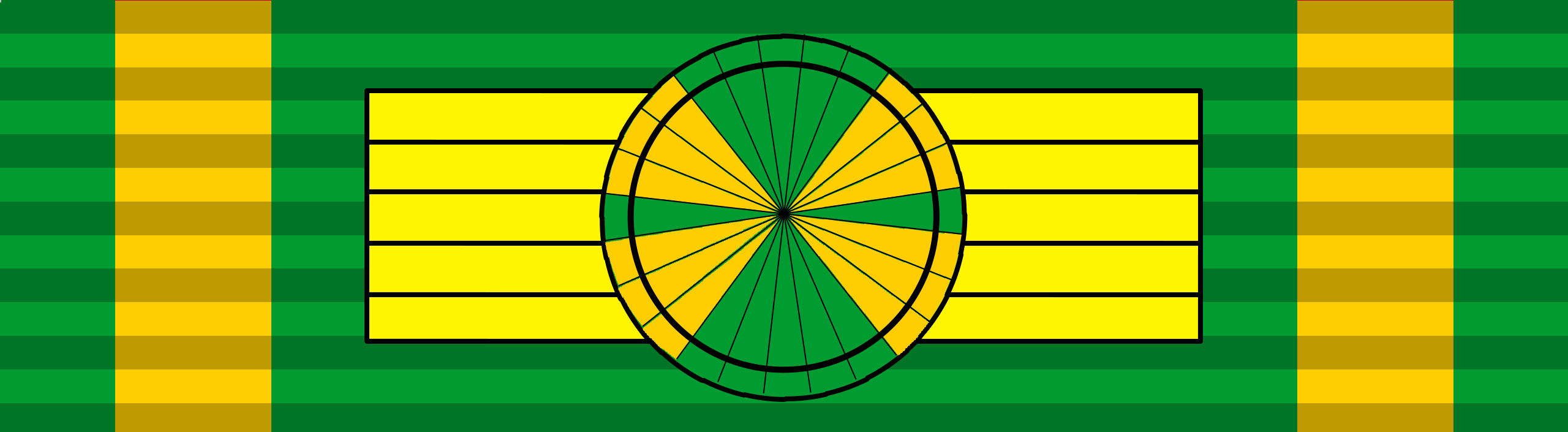
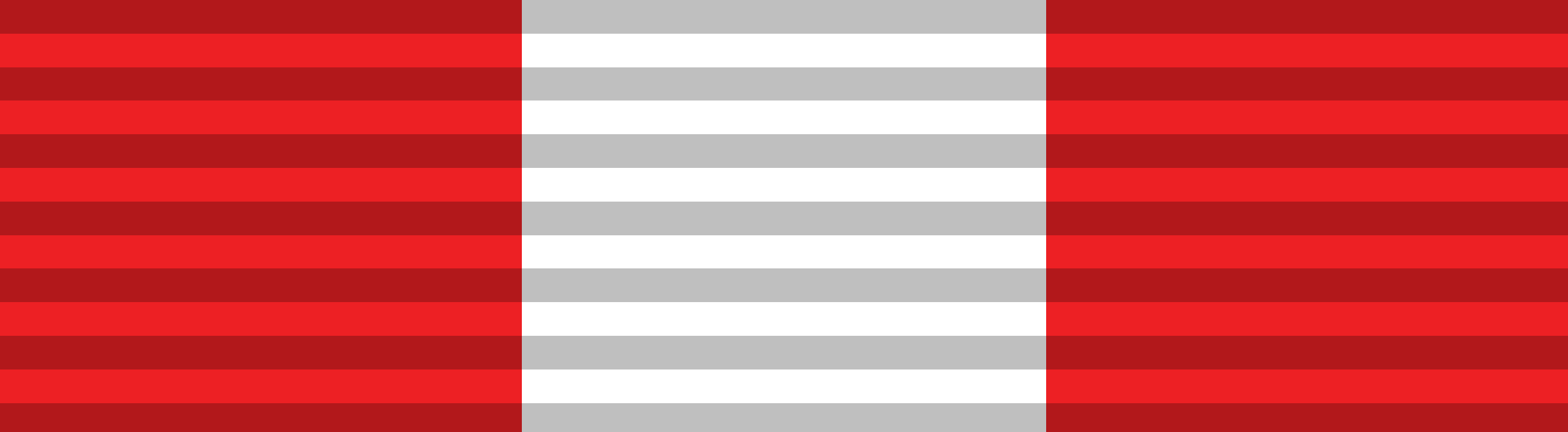
- Awards: Nishan-e-Imtiaz (Military) Hilal-e-Imtiaz (Military) Order of King Abdulaziz Turkish Legion of Merit Legion of Honour

Tariq Majid NI(M) HI(M) LoH (Urdu: طارق مجید; born 23 August 1950) is a retired four-star rank army general in the Pakistan Army who served as the 13th Chairman of the Joint Chiefs of Staff Committee from 2007 to 2010, the principal and highest-ranking military adviser in the Pakistan Armed Forces.

Prior to this promotion, he was the field operational commander of X Corps, stationed in Rawalpindi. His other commanding staff assignments include the Chief of General Staff (CGS) from 2003 to 2006 and Director General of the Military Intelligence (DGMI) from 2000 to 2003, all premier staff commands of the Pakistan Army. He was succeeded as chairman joint chiefs by another four-star rank general officer General Khalid Shameem Wynne.

== Biography ==
=== Personal background ===
Tariq Majid was born on 23 August 1950 in Lahore, Punjab, Pakistan. He was educated at Government Islamia College, Civil Lines, Lahore, and Government College, Lahore. Tariq Majid was admitted to the Pakistan Military Academy in Kakul, in 1967. He graduated with a Bachelor's degree from PMA in 1971 and commissioned in the Pakistan Army as a 2nd Lieutenant in the 28th Light anti-tank weapon Battalion of the Baloch Regiment of Pakistan Army in April 1971. After participating in the 1971 war, Majid went on to obtain master of science in Joint warfare from the Command and Staff College in Quetta in 1982.

=== Professorship and academia ===
Apart from active military service, Majid has tenured as professor of military and strategic studies at the both military and civilian institutions. He taught and lectured courses on military science, defense and war studies, and military policy matters at the Department of Strategic and Defense Studies of the Quaid-e-Azam University in Islamabad. In 1985, he was sent to attend the Malaysian Armed Forces Staff College in Kuala Lumpur where he did specialization on staff courses. From 1985 and onward, Majid went to United States and joined the Asia-Pacific Center for Security Studies in Honolulu, Hawaii, U.S. as a research associate. Majid also holds another master's degree in War studies from the National Defence University in Islamabad, which he was conferred in 1991 after submitting his thesis to the university board. After his studies, he assumed the full professorship of war studies at the National Defence University and also taught strategic studies course at the Quaid-i-Azam University.

== Military career ==
As a junior officer, Tariq Majid participated in the 1971 war and commanded a light anti-tank platoon against the Indian Army during the conflict. After the war, he would later on served in the academic institutions of Pakistan military on deputation. On promotion to the rank of Lieutenant-Colonel in January 1988, he commanded the Infantry battalion in which he was originally commissioned; in 1991, he also commanded another Infantry battalion. In February 1994, he was promoted to one star rank, Brigadier and commanded two Infantry Brigades as General Staff Officer-1 (GSO-1). On elevation to the two-star rank of Major-General in February 1999, he was appointed General Officer Commanding of 10th Infantry Division, stationed at Lahore.

=== Staff and command appointments ===
Tariq Majid served in the major staff and command appointments in the Pakistan military. Upon promoting to brigadier, he was appointed as the General Staff Officer Grade-1 at the Directorate-General for Military Operations (DGMO). During his military career, he accepted the professorship in the military institutions, and briefly taught courses on military tactics at the School School of Infantry and Tactics (SC&T), and topics in strategic studies at the Command and Staff College in Quetta.

As a Brigadier, he was appointed Director Military Operations (Plans) in the Military Operations Directorate at General Headquarters and Deputy Commandant of Pakistan Military Academy. In April 2001, he was appointed as director-general of Military Intelligence (DGMI) which he held until December 2003.

=== Chief of General Staff and Corps Commander ===
On 19 December 2003, Major-General Tariq Majid's promotion on three-star rank, Lieutenant-General, and appointed to the post of Chief of General Staff, in place of Lieutenant-General Shahid Aziz, who proceeded as the corps commander Lahore. The post of chief of general staff is important in a sense that it heads the important military bureaus of Military Intelligence (MI) and Military Operations.

Tariq Majid's stint as the X Corps commander was eventful as it featured the suspension of Chief Justice Iftikhar Muhammad Chaudhry and the following mass protests, and the Operation Silence. In the latter occasion, he took over the planning of the Red mosque operation that was done on the direct instructions of the ousted President Pervez Musharraf. According to media reports, the warnings of DGMO and MI were bypassed by President Musharraf and issued "direct" orders to commander of X Corps Lieutenant-General Tariq Majid. However, his critics made some allegations that Majid, being one of the confident, was thoroughly briefed of the Lal Masjid siege.

Soon, he gained significant publicity from this event, and was soon predicted by the media and the analysts to be promoted to the four-star assignments of either vice chief of army staff or chairman joint chiefs. These predictions were true, when in October 2007, he was made the Chairman Joint Chiefs of Staff Committee.

=== Chairman Joint Chiefs of Staff Committee ===
Upon General P. Musharraf's retirement from the army, Majid's appointment to four star rank was highly speculated in the media and military science circles. As early as in August and the following month, Majid was initially in the race to be appointed as chief of army staff. In military science circles, Majid was known to be a professional soldier and though, his closeness to Musharraf become a liability in country's political science circles.

On 3 October 2007, the media in Pakistan announced that Lieutenant-General Tariq Majid was promoted to four-star rank, and his nomination to succeed general Ehsan-ul-Haq was already approved by President Musharraf. On 8 October 2007, he was sworn as chairman joint chiefs and took over the operations of Joint Staff Headquarters (JS HQ).

Upon taking the JS HQ secretariat, Majid became the only officer from the Baloch Regiment after Rahimuddin Khan to ascend to chairman joint chiefs. At the time of promotion, Tariq Majid was fourth on the seniority list. Lieutenant Generals Khalid Kidwai, Ashfaq Parvez Kayani (who was also promoted as four-star and made VCOAS), and Malik Arif Hayat were all senior to him, all of whom stood superseded and sought retirement. On race to the promotion to this four-star assignment, lieutenant-General Khalid Kidwai was already on a year's extension, and another lieutenant-general Malik Arif Hayat had never commanded a corps thus virtually taking him out of the race for the top two slots in the army.

Less than two weeks of being chairman joint chiefs, a suicide attack was struck on Majid when a suicide bomber struck a police checkpoint in the high security zone of Rawalpindi on October 30. It was carried out less than a kilometer from President General Pervez Musharraf's camp office, killing seven people, three of them policemen, and injuring 31 others. The blast splattered check post of General Tariq Majid's official residence. During the armed escalations with India, Majid served as the top military adviser to government and it was widely circulated that he, together with chiefs of navy, army and air force, had advised the president Asif Ali Zardari to take back his statement made last month, that his country would not be the first to use nuclear weapons in the event of a conflict with India". Responding to the India's military movement at the India-Pakistan border in 2010, General Majid told the Pakistan's media representatives at the ISPR that "the Indian army knows the capacity of the Pakistan armed forces. Responding to the Indian Army's Chief of Staff's statement of Indian military preparations to fight China and Pakistan simultaneously, Majid told the journalists that "leave alone China, General Deepak Kapoor knows very well what the Indian Army cannot and Pakistan Armed Forces can pull off militarily.

As chairman joint chiefs, Majid notably terminated all military debriefings of senior scientist Abdul Qadeer Khan and recognized his services done to the country publicly on first week of November 2008. Earlier to this, Majid was known for welcoming dr. Qadeer Khan in the country's military science circles where Qadeer Khan was still welcomed. In 2010, while lecturing on nuclear weapons politics, Majid endorsed Qadeer Khan's services and stressed to the fact that: "Pakistan had to be mindful of a blatant pursuit of military preponderance in its eastern neighborhood". Lecturing at the National Defense University, General Majid argued that "a proposed fissile material cutoff treaty would target Pakistan specifically. Islamabad has refused to allow talks on such a pact to proceed at the International Conference on Disarmament. As chairman joint chiefs, Majid had asserted his role as principal military adviser to the government of Prime minister Yousaf Raza Gillani and President Asif Ali Zardari on the matters involving the nuclear policy, military affairs, and geostrategic positions of Pakistan. He presented the government a tri-services combat framework to tackle the joint combat operations against the extreme elements; a plan which was duly approved by Prime minister Gillani as part of his war strategy. While presenting this plan Majid noted to Prime minister Gillani that there is a need to harmonize individual capacities of the services so that efforts are synergized within a framework of jointness and inter-operability to meet present and future challenges. He played a vital role in devising the government to change its foreign policy to neutral matters in Afghanistan, and to lessen the American influence in the country which had dismayed the civil society of the country.

=== Views on nuclear disarmament ===
About the Afghan war, Majid is reported to have said, "Pakistan has become a "punching bag" in the American media, specifically the CNN." In a secret conversation with American ambassador Anne W. Patterson General Majid added, "It got to the point where we are looking at our own contingencies." Ambassador Patterson later replied that his statement was astonishing. In 2007, Majid maintained to the country's media representatives, about the security of country's strategic nuclear arsenals that the nuclear and strategic assets are well protected with robust safeguards and very elaborate security system. Any irresponsible "act by any one against it will be responded very strongly at all levels of command", Majid quoted.

In a speech at the National Defense University and Quaid-i-Azam University, Majid outlines that atomic deterrence against a possible aggression was a compulsion, and not a choice for Pakistan. Majid exhorted to the world delegation at the NDU that, "World must accept Pakistan as nuclear power." While dismissing all the concerns on the safety of country's nuclear arsenal, Majid maintains to the fact: "We are shouldering our responsibility with utmost vigilance and confidence. We have put in place a very robust regime that includes "multilayered mechanisms" and processes to secure our strategic assets, and have provided maximum transparency on our practices. We have reassured the international community on this issue over and over again and our track record since the time our atomic bomb program was made overt has been unblemished".

== Retirement ==
Prime Minister Yousaf Raza Gillani sent a nomination of General Shameem Wynne as the next Chairman of the Joint Chiefs of Staff Committee on October 8, 2010. In military circles, he was well established and had a reputation as a "pragmatic general" and an "embodiment of professionalism thorough professional officer who sets and strives for high standards of excellence." Before retiring, General Majid completed all of his farewell meetings with important and key political and military leadership. In a simple but dignified ceremony amid Guard of Honour, General Majid handed over the operations of joint staff secretariat to incoming General Khalid Shameem Wynne.

== Awards and decorations ==

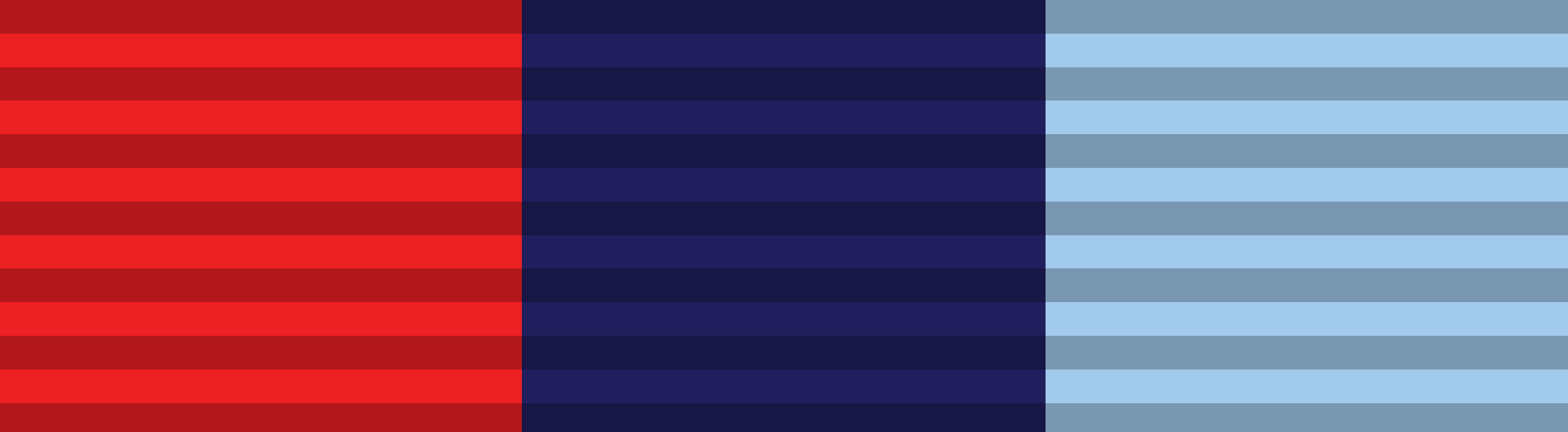

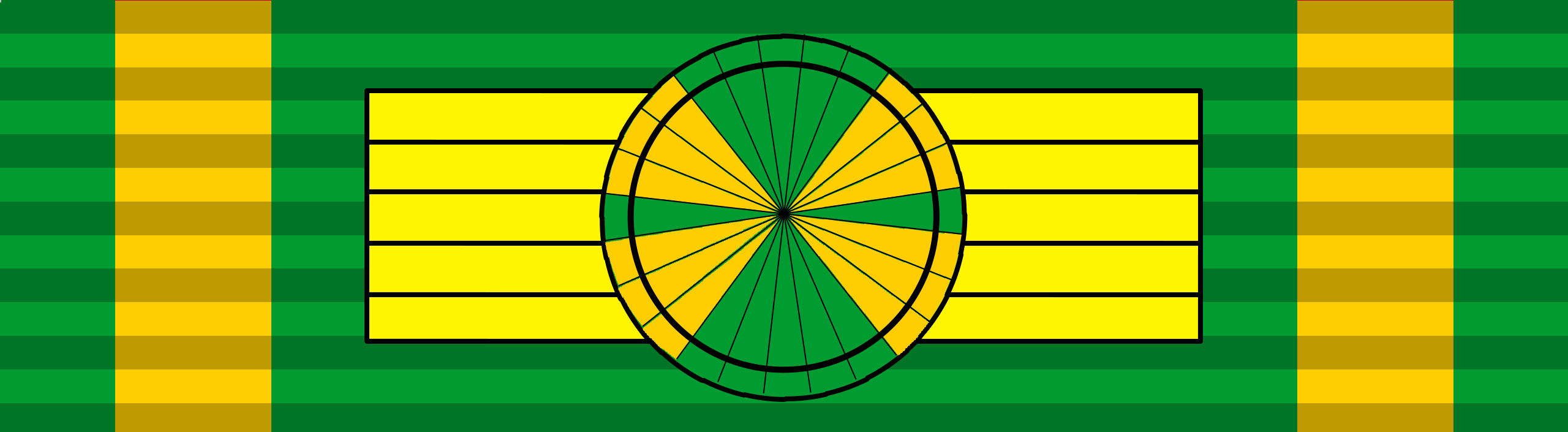

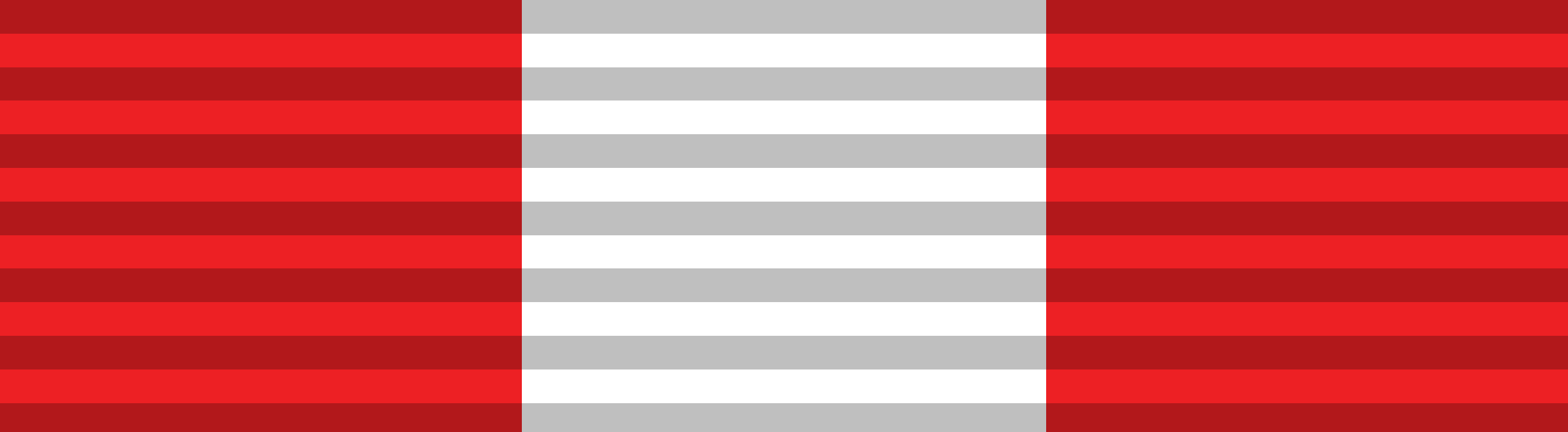

Nishan-e-Imtiaz (Military) (Order of Excellence)	Hilal-e-Imtiaz (Military) (Crescent of Excellence)	Sitara-e-Harb 1971 War (War Star 1971)	Tamgha-e-Jang 1971 War (War Medal 1971)
Tamgha-e-Baqa (Nuclear Test Medal) 1998	Tamgha-e-Istaqlal Pakistan (Escalation with India Medal) 2002	10 Years Service Medal	20 Years Service Medal
30 Years Service Medal	35 Years Service Medal	40 Years Service Medal	Tamgha-e-Sad Saala Jashan-e- Wiladat-e-Quaid-e-Azam (100th Birth Anniversary of Muhammad Ali Jinnah) 1976
Hijri Tamgha (Hijri Medal) 1979	Jamhuriat Tamgha (Democracy Medal) 1988	Qarardad-e-Pakistan Tamgha (Resolution Day Golden Jubilee Medal) 1990	Tamgha-e-Salgirah Pakistan (Independence Day Golden Jubilee Medal) 1997
Command & Staff College Quetta Instructor's Medal	Order of King Abdul Aziz (1st Class) (Saudi Arabia) 2009	Turkish Legion of Merit (Turkey) 2010	The Legion of Honour Officer Class (France) 2010

=== Foreign decorations ===
Foreign Awards		Date Awarded	Notes
Saudi Arabia	Order of King Abdul Aziz (Class I)	April 5, 2009	Military; conferred by Chief of General Staff of Saudi Arabian Army
Turkey	Turkish Legion of Merit	June 29, 2010	Military; conferred by Prime Minister of Turkey
France	Légion d'honneur	October 5, 2010	Officer Class; President of France

== See also ==
- Military science

Military offices
Preceded by Shahid Aziz	Chief of General Staff; 2003–2006	Succeeded by Salahuddin Satti
Preceded by Ehsan ul Haq	Chairman Joint Chiefs of Staff Committee; 2007–2010	Succeeded by Khalid Shameem Wynne
