= Shahbaz Khan =

Shahbaz Khan may refer to:

- Shahbaz Khan (actor), formerly Haider Amir, Indian actor
- Shahbaz Khan (colonel), Pakistan Army colonel
- Shahbaz Khan (cricketer) (born 1991), Pakistani cricketer
- Shahbaz Khan (hydrologist), Australian climatologist and hydrologist
- Shahbaz Khan Bugti, Baloch tribal chief
- Shahbaz Khan Kamboh (1529–1599), Mughal general of Akbar
