= A.R. Siddiqui =

Pakistani army brigadier and author

Brigadier General Abdur Rahman Siddiqui
- Military career
- Allegiance: Pakistan
- Branch: Pakistan Army
- Rank: Brigadier
- Commands: Director General of ISPR

Abdur Rahman Siddiqui, better known as A.R. Siddiqui, is a Pakistani author and former Pakistan Army officer. From March 1967 to November 1973, he served as the director-general of the Inter-Services Public Relations. He retired as a brigadier from Pakistan Army.

== Career ==
Between March 1967 and November 1973, he was the director-general of the Inter-Services Public Relations.

== Books ==
- The Military in Pakistan: Image and Reality
- General Agha Mohammad Yahya Khan: The Rise and Fall of a Soldier
- Making of the Mohajir Mindset
- East Pakistan: The Endgame: An Onlooker's Journal 1969–71
