= Shaukat Sultan =

Pakistani general

Major General Shaukat Sultan
- Military career
- Allegiance: Pakistan
- Branch: Pakistan Army
- Service years: 1972 – 2007
- Rank: Major General
- Unit: Sindh Regiment
- Commands: DG ISPR; GOC 10th Infantry Division, Lahore; DG Foreign Military Cooperation (FMC)
- Conflicts: Bosnian War of 1995; War in North-West Pakistan
- Awards: Hilal-e-Imtiaz (Military)

Shaukat Sultan Khan, HI(M), afwc, psc, is a former Director General of the ISPR, the PR wing of the Pakistani Armed Forces. He served from 2003 to 2007.

He took over the post from Major General Rashid Qureshi in June 2003. He was the public face of the Pakistan Army and spokesperson of Pakistan's military efforts against armed resistance in the Balochistan region, military operations in Waziristan and the war against Al-Qaeda near the Pakistan-Afghanistan border.

== Early life and education ==
Shaukat Sultan Khan was commissioned in the Sindh Regiment of the Pakistan Army in August 1972 in the 3rd Special War Course. He is a graduate of the United States Army Infantry School, Fort Benning, GA, Command and Staff College in Quetta, and National Defence College in Islamabad. For 6 months in 1983 he trained at Fort Benning, and he holds a Master's degree in War Studies from Quaid-i-Azam University, Islamabad.

According to the United Kingdom’s Companies House database, he was born in December 1954, identifying Scotland as his current place of residence.

== Military career ==
His command assignments include command of his parent battalion, a brigade on the Line of Control, and a brigade in the Strike Corps. His staff assignments include brigade major and Director Military Operations.

He has been on the faculty of the Pakistan Military Academy, School of Infantry and Tactics, Command and Staff College and National Defence College in Islamabad. He has also served as a UN Military Observer in the UN Mission in Bosnia in 1995–1996.

He was promoted to major general in June 2003 and was appointed as director general of the ISPR. He was given the additional responsibility of press secretary to the President of Pakistan in June 2004.

After completing his tenure, he was replaced by Major General Waheed Arshad, who became the new DG ISPR on 1 March 2007. Major General Shaukat Sultan was then posted as general officer commanding (GOC), 10th Infantry Division Lahore.

Later, he was superseded and made director general Foreign Military Cooperation (FMC), at the Joint Staff Headquarters in Rawalpindi.

== Criticism ==
The Pakistani government's suggestion that Osama bin Laden, the world's most wanted terrorist, could be its untroubled guest came in the course of an interview to ABC News by its spokesman Major General Shaukat Sultan. If he is in Pakistan, bin Laden "would not be taken into custody," Major General Shaukat Sultan told ABC News of the United States in the interview, "as long as one is being like a peaceful citizen."

Sultan's comments came in the context of questions in the US about the withdrawal of Pakistani military from Waziristan under a deal with pro-Taliban militants, a development that was greeted in the US media with headlines such as "Pakistan surrenders to Taliban."

Analysts attribute this blunder more to General Sultan's lack of understanding of diplomatic norms and to his language barrier.

After Shaukat Sultan's interview comments became controversial, Pakistan's Prime Minister Shaukat Aziz told CNN International that "anybody who is wanted or is a terrorist or has committed acts of terror anywhere in the world and is wanted, there is no immunity for such people."

Later in Washington, Mahmud Ali Durrani, Pakistani Ambassador to the United States also added that Shaukat Sultan had been grossly misquoted in the U.S. media.

== After retirement activities ==
After retiring from the Pakistan Army, Shaukat Sultan was serving as an executive director of Bahria Town, Rawalpindi, Pakistan.

== See also ==
- Pakistan Army
- Inter Services Public Relations

Military offices
| Preceded by Rashid Qureshi | Director General of the ISPR; 2003 – 2007 | Succeeded by Waheed Arshad |
