= Haroon Islam =

Pakistan Army colonel

- Born: 14 October 1967; Lahore, Punjab, Pakistan
- Died: 8 July 2007 (aged 39); Islamabad, Islamabad Capital Territory (ICL)
- Education: Pakistan Military Academy; Command and Staff College, Quetta
- Military career
- Allegiance: Pakistan
- Branch: Pakistan Army
- Service years: 1988–2007
- Rank: Lieutenant Colonel
- Service number: PA-27053
- Unit: 3rd Sindh Regiment
- Commands: Zarrar Anti Terrorist Battalion
- Conflicts: Siachen Conflict; Kargil Conflict; War in North-West Pakistan; Operation Silence †
- Awards: Hilal-e-Shujaat (2009); Chief of Army Staff Commendation Medal

Haroon Islam was a Pakistani military officer, who served in the Special Service Group of the Pakistan Army and was killed in action during Operation Silence.

He was a commanding officer during Operation Silence and was killed in fierce fighting which took place outside the Red Mosque in Islambad.

On March 23, 2008, he was posthumously awarded the second highest civilian award, Hilal-e-Shujaat (Crescent of Bravery) by the President of Pakistan.

== Biography ==
His elder brother is an assistant director in the FIA while another brother, Major Ehtisham-ul-Islam, is a retired Army Officer. He joined and gained commission in the 3rd Battalion of the Sindh Regiment of Pakistan Army in 1988. He was a graduate of Command and Staff College, Quetta in 1993 and joined Pakistan Army's elite special forces branch, the SSG (Special Service Group) in 1993. He had a successful military career. In 1998, his unit was deployed in Kargil, and had participated in the Kargil War.

In recognition of his services, he was awarded the Chief of Army Staff Commendation Medal. During his career with the SSG, he commanded the elite Zarrar Company (The anti-terrorist unit of the SSG).

== Free fall accident ==
Previously in his life, he survived a potentially fatal free fall accident when his parachute entangled with another. He not only survived the accident but became fit enough to rejoin the SSG. He was also a graduate of the prestigious Command and Staff College, Quetta. Because of his meritorious services, he was awarded the Chief of Army Staff Commendation Card.

== Death ==
In July 2007, the conflict between Lal Masjid and the Government of Pakistan deepened and the government decided to launch a military operation against the fundamentalist militia. the Pakistan Army assigned the 7th Commando Zarrar Battalion of SSG led by Haroon to take over the mosque.

The operation was launched on July 3, 2007, and Haroon was killed on the midnight of 8 July 2007, while entering the mosque. reports indicate that he was hit while planting explosives on the outer perimeter wall of the complex.

=== In mourning ===
On behalf of then Prime Minister Shaukat Aziz and the federal cabinet, a two-member delegation consisting of Additional Secretary (Cabinet Division) Saeed Ahmad Khan and Joint Secretary (Cabinet Committee) Muhammad Zahid Khan visited his widow.

The Pakistan Army presented the Guard of honour to Haroon. Later, his body was sent to Lahore for burial. He is buried in a Military cemetery graveyard in Lahore.
