= Tafazzul Siddiqui =

Pakistan naval officer

Brigadier General Tafazzul Siddiqui TI(M)
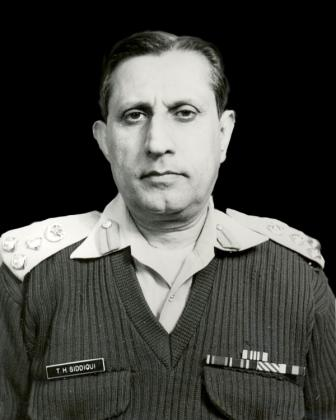
- Brigadier Tafazzul Siddiqui
- Born: December 31, 1925; Lucknow (British India)
- Died: August 6, 2002 (aged 76); Karachi, Pakistan
- Burial place: Gizri cemetery
- Alma mater: University of Lucknow
- Spouse: Farrukh
- Children: 4
- Military career
- Allegiance: Pakistan
- Branch: Pakistan Army; Pakistan Navy
- Service years: 1953–1985
- Rank: Brigadier
- Nickname: T. H. Siddiqui
- Commands: Pakistan General Headquarters; Pakistan Naval Headquarters; Inter-Services Public Relations
- Awards: Tamgha-e-Imtiaz
- Other work: Pakistan Press International (Vice-chairperson)

Tafazzul Hussain Siddiqui (31 December 1925 – 6 August 2002) was a Pakistani naval officer, journalist, vice-chairperson of Pakistan Press International, and seventh director-general of Inter-Services Public Relations served from April 1977 to July 1985.

== Biography ==
Brigadier Tafazzul was born on 31 December 1925 in British India at Lucknow. Before migrating to Pakistan, he earned a master's degree in international relations in 1945, and later attended University of Lucknow where he did master's degree in history. After earning academic degrees, he served as a member of hockey team at Lucknow university. Following the Partition of India, he migrated to Pakistan in 1948 where he initially worked as an editor at Daily Pakistan newspaper. In 1953, he was commissioned in the Pakistan armed force and served at General Headquarters, Rawalpindi. In 1960 or later, he was appointed to the staff of the Corps headquarters in East Pakistan and subsequently was appointed to the Naval Headquarters at Karachi. Tafazzul was later assigned as a public relations officer in naval department where he served for ten years. Between 1980 and 1981, he reached to the rank of brigadier and was subsequently appointed as director-general of Inter-Services Public Relations. After he retired from the armed services in 1985, he worked at Pakistan Press International as a vice-chairperson.

== Death ==
Tafazzul was suffering from multiple ailments, and was subsequently admitted to the Pakistan navy medical institute for treatment. He died in Karachi on 6 August 2002 due to congestive cardiac failure. He is buried at defence officers society cemetery, "Gizri".
