= Rashid Qureshi =

Pakistani general

Major General Rashid Qureshi
- راشد قریشی

Director General of the ISPR
- In office November 1998 – May 2003

Personal details
- Born: Lahore, Pakistan
- Education: Pakistan Military Academy
- Awards: Sitara-i-Imtiaz (military); Sitara-e-Basalat

Military service
- Allegiance: Pakistan
- Branch/service: Pakistan Army
- Years of service: 1971–2005
- Rank: Major General
- Commands: DG ISPR; DG National Guard; Comd 2AK Bde As A Brig.1996-97
- Battles/wars: Indo-Pakistani War of 1971; Siachen conflict; Kargil War; 2001–2002 India–Pakistan standoff

Rashid Qureshi, (Urdu: راشد قریشی) is a retired two-star general of the Pakistan Army who served as Director General of Inter-Services Public Relations.

== Military career ==
Qureshi was commissioned in the Pakistan Army on 17 April 1971 in the 44th PMA Long Course. During the Indo-Pakistani War of 1971, he was stationed at the Lahore Sector. After the war, Qureshi's company was stationed at the Rawalpindi sector where he became a staff officer at the General Headquarters (GHQ). In 1987, he was promoted to lieutenant colonel, and was made general officer commanding of the 10th Battalion. In 1991, he became a colonel in the Army, and was made military secretary to General Pervez Musharraf at the Joint Chief of Staff Committee Secretariat.

== Inter-services public relations ==
In 1998, Qureshi joined the Inter-Services Public Relations (ISPR).He was made director-general of the ISPR.

He was also a principal military spokesperson of General Pervez Musharraf.

He retired from the Pakistan Army in 2005 and currently resides in Islamabad, Pakistan.

== 2007 helicopter crash ==
On 9 October 2007, in a helicopter crash which killed four people, and injured five, Qureshi was amongst those who were injured. The helicopter was one of three escorting Pervez Musharraf to Azad Kashmir.

Military offices
Preceded by Ghazanfar Ali	Director General of the ISPR; 1998–2003	Succeeded by Shaukat Sultan
