= Khalid Shameem Wynne =

Pakistani military officer (1953–2017)

Khalid Shameem Wynne NI(M), HI(M)
- خالد شمیم وائیں
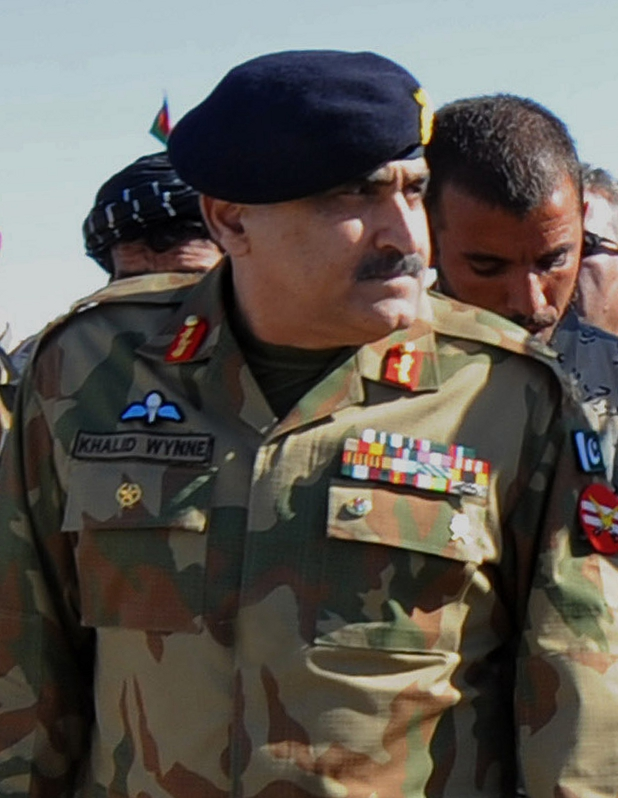

14th Chairman Joint Chiefs of Staff Committee
- In office 8 October 2010 – 8 October 2013
- Preceded by: General Tariq Majid
- Succeeded by: General Ashfaq Parvez Kayani

Personal details
- Born: Khalid Shameem Wynne; 28 August 1953 Abbottabad, North-West Frontier Province, Dominion of Pakistan
- Died: 30 December 2017 (aged 64) Chakri, Punjab, Pakistan
- Cause of death: Tyre Burst Motor-vehicle collision
- Parent: Lieutenant Colonel Arshad Shamim Wynne (father)
- Education: Cadet College Hasan Abdal; Bundeswehr Command & Staff College; Quetta Command & Staff College; National Defence College; Quaid-i-Azam University
- Nickname: Wynne

Military service
- Allegiance: Pakistan
- Branch/service: Pakistan Army
- Years of service: 1971–2013
- Rank: General
- Unit: 20th Punjab Regiment
- Commands: Chief of General Staff; Commander XII Corps; Commadant School of Infantry & Tactics, Quetta; Deputy, Chief of General Staff (D-CGS); GOC 41 Infantry Division
- Battles/wars: Indo-Pakistani War of 1971; Siachen conflict; Balochistan insurgency; War in North-West Pakistan
- Awards: Nishan-e-Imtiaz (MI); Hilal-e-Imtiaz (MI)

Khalid Shameem Wynne NI(M), HI(M)(Urdu: خالد شمیم وائیں; 28 August 1953 – 30 December 2017), was a Pakistani four-star general who served as the 14th Chairman of the Joint Chiefs of Staff Committee appointed in 2010 until retiring on 8 October 2013.

== Early life and education ==
Wynne came from an ethnic Kashmiri family with an army background and hailed from the soldier-producing area of Sialkot. His father, Lieutenant Colonel Arshad Shameem Wynne served in the Pakistan Army until 1972. His unit was also the 20th battalion of the Punjab Regiment.

Khalids father, Arshad was a close aide to Muhammad Ali Jinnah.

Khalid obtained his earlier education from various cantonment schools all over Pakistan and joined Cadet College Hasan Abdal as special entry in 1969 after matriculation.

== Military career ==
In 1971, Wynne joined the Army after his intermediate examination. He passed out in April 1972 in the 1st Special War Course to join his father's battalion, 20 Punjab Regiment. He graduated from Command and Staff College, Quetta; Bundeswehr Command and Staff College, Hamburg, Germany; and the National Defence University, Islamabad. He held a master's degree in War Studies from Quaid-i-Azam University.

=== Command appointments ===
Wynne had held various command, staff and instructional appointments during his 42-year military career. He had been a brigade major of two infantry brigades. He had commanded his own 20th Battalion of the Punjab Regiment, two infantry brigades, including the 323 Infantry Brigade in Siachen (also known as Siachen Brigade), the 41st Infantry Division in Quetta and the Southern Command in Quetta.

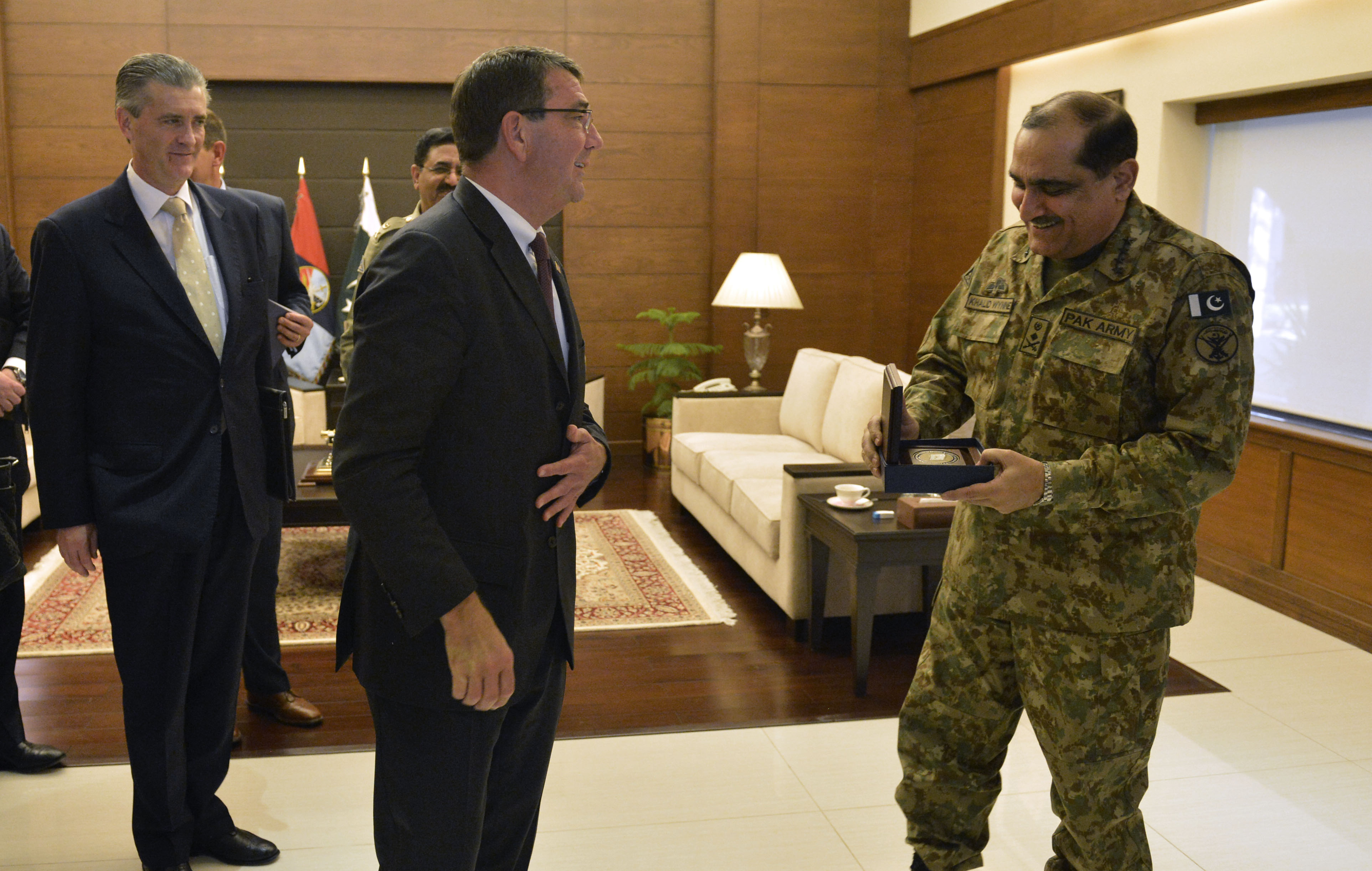
Ash Carter (center) with Wynne (right), 16 September 2013

=== Staff and instructional appointments ===
On the academic part, he had held various instructional designations and remained on the faculty of School of Infantry and Tactics, Quetta; Command and Staff College, Quetta and Pakistan Military Academy, Kakul.

Wynne also remained Chief of Staff in a Corps Headquarters and Commandant of the School of Infantry and Tactics in Quetta. He had also served in General Staff directorate, staying as Deputy Chief of General Staff (DCGS) from 2006 to 2007 and then as Chief of General Staff from April 2010 to October 2010.

== Chairman Joint Chiefs of Staff Committee ==
Prior to his promotion, the official statement noted that "General Wynne was appointed as Chairman Joint Chiefs of Staff Committee by President Asif Ali Zardari, on the advice of Prime Minister Yousuf Raza Gilani."

Before this appointment, Wynne was serving as the Chief of General Staff (CGS) at the Army GHQ since April 2010. He also served as field operational Commander of the XII Corps in Quetta from 2007 to 2010, overseeing the Baloch insurgency and the fallout of the war in the Tribal Areas.

At the onset of the initial retirement dates of Generals Ashfaq Parvez Kayani and Tariq Majid at the end of 2010, Wynne would have been the senior-most general in the Pakistan Army and thus a candidate for a four-star post.

In September 2010, it was announced that Lieutenant General Wynne would be promoted as four-star general and would replace General Tariq Majid as the Chairman Joint Chiefs of Staff Committee on 8 October 2010. He retired on 8 October 2013, after 42 years in active services.

== Death ==
Khalid Shameem Wynne died while travelling to Lahore on 30 December 2017, when a tire on the SUV they were travelling in burst near Chakri Interchange on the Rawalpindi–Lahore motorway. The injured were taken to Combined Military Hospital, Rawalpindi. Pakistani Prime Minister Shahid Khaqan Abbasi and Chief Minister Punjab Shehbaz Sharif expressed their grief over Wynne's death.

Wynne was laid to rest in Lahore on 1 January 2018. His funeral prayer was attended by COAS Gen Qamar Javed Bajwa, former president Asif Ali Zardari and former army chief Gen Raheel Sharif.

== Awards and decorations ==

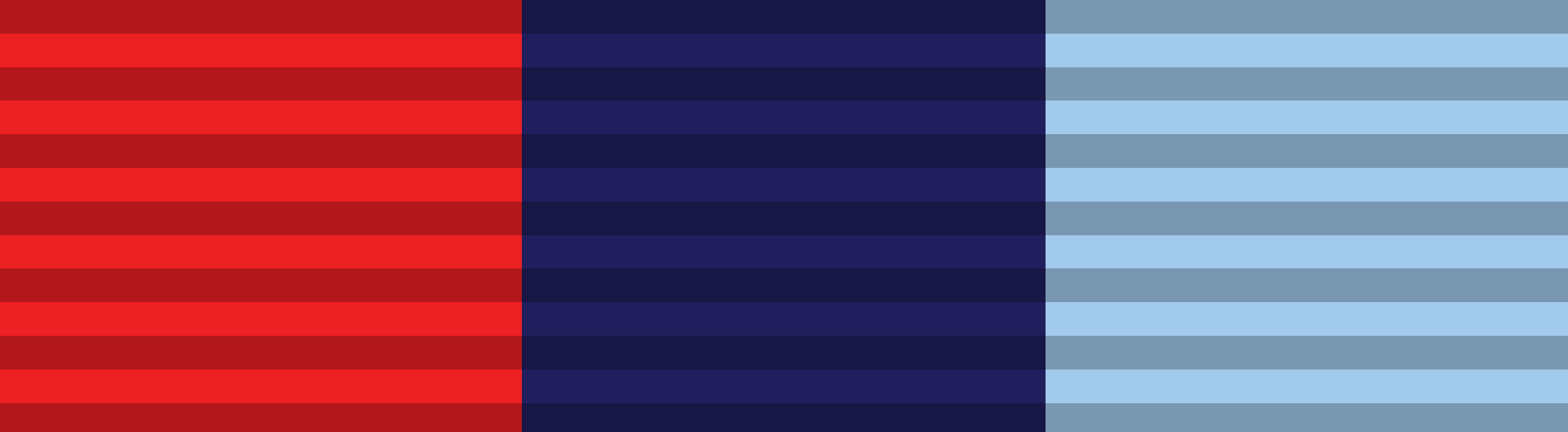

	Nishan-e-Imtiaz (Military) (Order of Excellence)		
Hilal-e-Imtiaz (Military) (Crescent of Excellence)	Tamgha-e-Diffa (General Service Medal) Siachen Glacier Clasp	Tamgha-e-Jang 1971 War (War Medal 1971)	Tamgha-e-Baqa (Nuclear Test Medal) 1998
Tamgha-e-Istaqlal Pakistan (Escalation with India Medal) 2002	10 Years Service Medal	20 Years Service Medal	30 Years Service Medal
35 Years Service Medal	40 Years Service Medal	Tamgha-e-Sad Saala Jashan-e- Wiladat-e-Quaid-e-Azam (100th Birth Anniversary of Muhammad Ali Jinnah) 1976	Hijri Tamgha (Hijri Medal) 1979
Jamhuriat Tamgha (Democracy Medal) 1988	Qarardad-e-Pakistan Tamgha (Resolution Day Golden Jubilee Medal) 1990	Tamgha-e-Salgirah Pakistan (Independence Day Golden Jubilee Medal) 1997	Command and Staff College Quetta Centenary Instructor's Medal (2007)

Military offices
Preceded by Mustafa Khan	Chief of General Staff; 2010	Succeeded by Waheed Arshad
Preceded by Tariq Majid	Chairman Joint Chiefs of Staff Committee; 2010 – 2013	Succeeded by Ashfaq Pervez Kayani (Acting)
