= Inamur Rahim =

Pakistani Army Officer

Inam-ur-Rahim
- Born: 1954 (age 71–72); Pakistan
- Occupation: Lawyer

Lieutenant colonel Inam-ur-Raheemor Inamur Rahim is a Pakistani lawyer and former military officer who served in the Pakistan Army.

Raheem has previously filed numerous petitions. He has fought for the recovery of missing persons and against administrative orders of the armed forces. He was also the counsel in petitions filed against court-martial proceedings about the GHQ attack and convictions of Pakistan Navy officers.

== Career ==
In 2012, as he was returning from a family funeral to his home in Rawalpindi. Three vehicles surrounded his taxi, in which six men, allegedly affiliated with Pakistan Army, came out and beat Raheem. Later, he was expelled from Pakistan Ex-Servicemen Society.

In December 2019, he was again abducted by 8 to 10 military personnel in Rawalpindi from his home.

On 10 January 2020, the Lahore High Court declared the detention of lawyer illegal and order the military to immediately release him. On 12 January 2019, the federal government challenged the decision. On 14 January 2020, the Supreme Court of Pakistan suspended the decision of Lahore High Court.

== Personal life ==
He is a practicing Muslim.
