= Waheed Arshad =

Three-star general of the Pakistan Army

Lieutenant General Waheed Arshad HI(M) Tbt
- Education: Command and Staff College; National Defence College; Quaid-i-Azam University; National University of Modern Languages
- Military career
- Allegiance: Pakistan
- Branch: Pakistan Army
- Service years: 1975–2013
- Rank: Lieutenant General
- Unit: Pakistan Army Armoured Corps
- Commands: Chief of General Staff; Inspector general Training and Evaluation; Vice Chief of General Staff; Director general Planning at COAS Secretariat; Director General ISPR; Commander 26th Mechanized Division
- Conflicts: Indo-Pakistani War of 1999; War in North West-Pakistan
- Awards: Hilal-e-Imtiaz (Military); Tamgha-e-Basalat
- Other work: Chairman Hussain Bibi Trust since June 2013

Waheed Arshad, HI(M), Tbt, is a retired three-star general in the Pakistan Army who served as the Chief of General Staff at the General Headquarters from 2010 to 2013. His previous appointments at the GHQ include; IG Training and Evaluation, Vice Chief of General Staff and Director General Planning at Chief of Army Staff Secretariat. Arshad also served as the Chief Army Spokesman heading the Inter Services Public Relations from 2007 to 2008.

== Army career ==
Arshad was commissioned in the Armoured Corps of the Pakistan Army in October 1975 in the 52nd PMA Long Course. He is a graduate of Command and Staff College Quetta; Turkish War College, Istanbul, and the National Defence College in Islamabad. He holds master's degrees in War and Strategic Studies from Quaid-i-Azam University, Islamabad and a diploma in the Turkish Language from National University of Modern Languages, Islamabad.

== Command, staff and instructional appointments ==
During his career, he served as Brigade Major of an Independent Armored Brigade Group and remained on the faculty of Pakistan Military Academy Kakul, School of Infantry and Tactics, Quetta and National Defence College, Islamabad.

He commanded 16 Horse, an Armored Regiment and both an Armored and Infantry Brigades. He has also served as General Staff Officer Grade-1 and Director Military Operations at Military Operations Directorate.

== Senior appointments ==
Arshad was promoted to Major General on 7 January 2005. He was then sent as GOC 26th Mechanized Division in Bahawalpur where he served until April 2007. He then proceeded to relieve Maj-Gen Shaukat Sultan as Director General of Inter Services Public Relations.

In January 2008, Arshad was appointed as the Director General, Planning at Chief Of Army Staff Secretariat, heading the army's think-tank. This post was established by the former Army Chief General Jehangir Karamat. Maj-Gen Khalid Kidwai (who retired as Lt-Gen and chief of Strategic Planning Division) and Maj-Gen Ahsan Saleem Hyat (who retired as general in the capacity of Vice Chief Of Army Staff) held the appointments of Director General Planning in the past. In October 2008, Arshad was appointed as the Vice Chief of General Staff of the Army replacing Lt. Gen. Muhammad Yousaf who took over the XXXI Corps at Bahawalpur.

Arshad was promoted to Lieutenant General in April 2010 and took over as IG Training and Evaluation. Barely six months later in October 2010, he took over as Chief of General Staff, the most coveted posting in Pakistan Army. He replaced the recently promoted General Khalid Shameem Wynne who was appointed as Chairman Joint Chiefs of Staff Committee. He was succeeded as Chief of General Staff by Lt General Rashad Mahmood, who later became the Chairman Joint Chiefs of Staff Committee.

== Personal life ==
Arshad is married and has three children.

== Awards and decorations ==
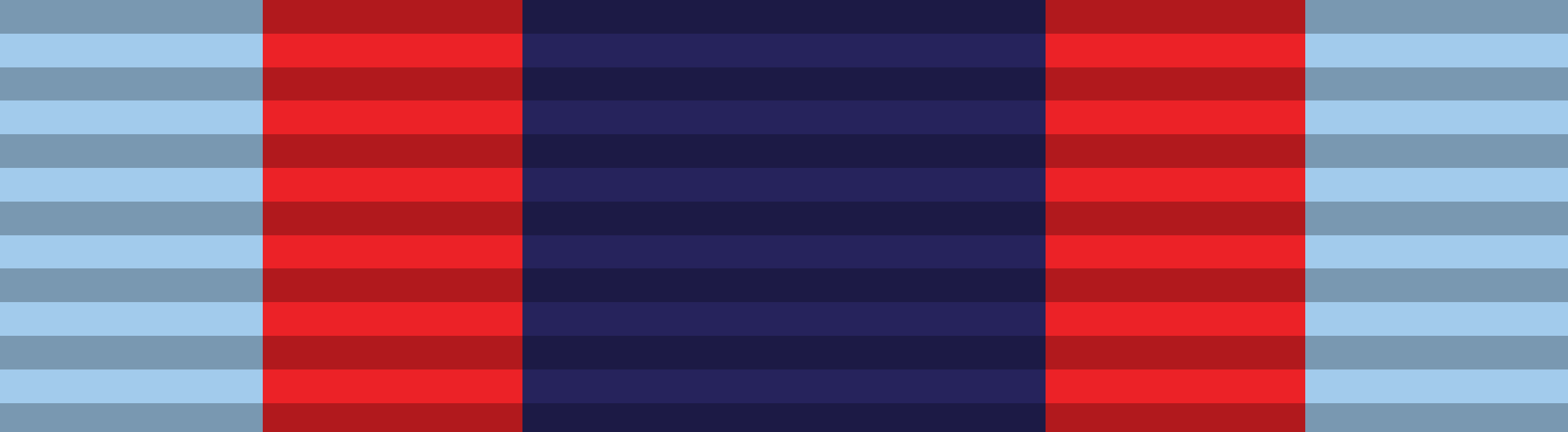

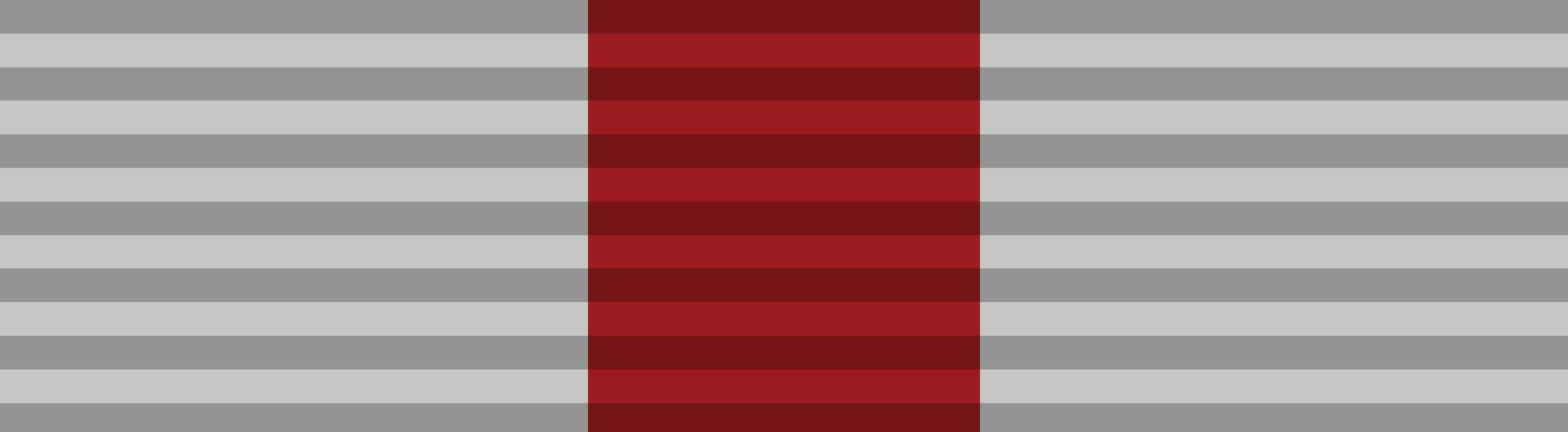

Hilal-e-Imtiaz (Military) (Crescent of Excellence)		Tamgha-e-Basalat (Medal of Good Conduct)	
Tamgha-e-Baqa (Nuclear Test Medal) with Bar	Tamgha-e-Istaqlal Pakistan (Escalation with India Medal) 2002	10 Years Service Medal	20 Years Service Medal
30 Years Service Medal	35 Years Service Medal	Tamgha-e-Sad Saala Jashan-e- Wiladat-e-Quaid-e-Azam (100th Birth Anniversary of Muhammad Ali Jinnah)	Hijri Tamgha (Hijri Medal) 1979
Jamhuriat Tamgha (Democracy Medal) 1988	Qarardad-e-Pakistan Tamgha (Resolution Day Golden Jubilee Medal) 1990	Tamgha-e-Salgirah Pakistan (Independence Day Golden Jubilee Medal) 1997	Command and Staff College Quetta Centenary Student's Medal 2007

Military offices
Preceded by Shaukat Sultan	Director General of the ISPR; 2007 – 2008	Succeeded by Athar Abbas
Preceded by Khalid Shameem Wynne	Chief of General Staff; 2010 – 2013	Succeeded by Rashad Mahmood
