= Shahbaz Khan (colonel) =

Pakistan Army officer

Colonel Shahbaz Khan
- شہباز خان

1st Director-General of Inter-Services Public Relations
- In office May 1949 – July 1952
- Preceded by: Post created
- Succeeded by: Maqbool Hussain

Personal details
- Born: Shahbaz Khan

Military service
- Allegiance: Pakistan
- Branch/service: Pakistan Army
- Rank: Colonel

Shahbaz Khan (Urdu: شہباز خان) was a Pakistan Army officer. He served as the first director-general of the Inter-Services Public Relations (ISPR) directorate, from its founding in May 1949 to July 1952. He was succeeded in the post by commander Maqbool Hussain.

A colonel-ranking officer, Khan was described as a "keen bridge player" who frequented the Lahore Gymkhana Club.

Military offices
Office established	Director-General of Inter-Services Public Relations; 1949–1952	Succeeded by Maqbool Hussain
