= Inter-Services Public Relations =

Media wing of the Pakistan Armed Forces

ISPR
- Inter-Services Public Relations
- پاک فوج کا شعبۂ تعلقاتِ عامہ
- Emblem of the ISPR
- Formation: May 1949; 77 years ago
- Type: Military Organization
- Purpose: Civil-Military Relations
- Headquarters: Rawalpindi, Punjab, Pakistan
- Director General: Lieutenant General Ahmed Sharif Chaudhry
- Affiliations: Pakistan Armed Forces
- Website: www.ispr.gov.pk

The Inter-Services Public Relations (ISPR) (Urdu: پاک فوج کا شعبۂ تعلقاتِ عامہ) is the media and public relations wing of the Pakistan Armed Forces. It broadcasts and coordinates military news and information to the country's civilian media and the civic society.

The ISPR directorate serves the purpose of aiming to strengthen public relations with the civic society and civil society through interacting with the media. The directorate also works as the principal voice of the Pakistan's military, with its director-general serving as the official spokesperson of the armed forces.

== History ==
The Directorate of the Inter–Services Public Relations (ISPR) was established in 1949 with army colonel Shahbaz Khan becoming its first director-general. The ISPR operates as a unified public relations system for the Pakistan Armed Forces, which includes army, air force, navy, and marines. The ISPR manages the public relations requirement of the armed forces, and is staffed with the combined personnel of the military along with civilian officers. It plays an important role for gathering a national support for the armed forces at the public level. The ISPR also aims to strengthen support for the military's assigned contingency operations while undermining the perceived stature of the adversary.

In views of US army colonel John Adache, the ISPR interfaces between the armed forces, civil media, and the civic society. Furthermore, the ISPR also formulates the media policy of the unified armed forces, and aims to safeguard the military interests of the armed forces from negative sentiment. The ISPR also monitors international and domestic media, surveying the nature of international reporting regarding Pakistan's military issues.

On a regular basis, the ISPR broadcasts televised news regarding the strategic operations in foreign and domestic areas. In Pakistan's military staff appointments and assignments, the ISPR is often perceived as one of the most prestigious directorates of Pakistan Armed Forces.

Its executive authority, a director-general, is a chief military spokesperson of the Pakistan Armed Forces.

=== Reorganization ===
In 2024, the ISPR underwent reorganization and expansion. Two two-star Major-general rank officers were appointed in the ISPR to handle foreign or strategic communication and domestic media. This will be the first time that ISPR will be permanently headed by an officer of the rank of Lieutenant General instead of Major General, and for the first time, two Major Generals will be appointed in ISPR.

Structure of ISPR
Directorates	Rank
Director-General Alpha (DG A)	Major general
Director-General Bravo (DG B)	Major general

== Operations ==
ISPR is responsible for garnering national support for the armed forces as well as strengthening their resolve to accomplish the assigned mission while undermining the will of the adversary.

It also acts as an interface between the armed forces, the media and the public. It formulates much of the media policy of Pakistan's military, safeguards the armed forces from negative influences and monitors both international and domestic media.

Political scientist Ayesha Siddiqa has argued that the ISPR has evolved beyond its original public-relations role into a key instrument for shaping national political narratives and advancing the Pakistan Army’s institutional power, including under army chief Asim Munir.

== Principal media network ==
On a regular basis, the ISPR releases televised press releases on ongoing military exercises and notifies the civilian media about the strategic arsenal tests.

Apart from functioning as the public relations body of the armed forces, the ISPR handles exclusive dissemination of information regarding Pakistan's ongoing military contingency operations.

== Media productions ==
Since the 1990s, the ISPR has been producing mini-series, drama, and films on military fiction. The first ISPR drama was Sunehray Din which was released in 1991. Some of the most famous dramas of ISPR include Ehd-e-Wafa, Waar, Shahpar, Ek Thi Marium and Sinf-e-Aahan. ISPR also made its first animated series Team Muhafiz in collaboration with Geo Entertainment which broadcast in 2022. Apart from dramas, the ISPR has also released many songs with the first one being titled "Rang Layega Shaheedon Ka Lahoo". ISPR has also released documentary films with the one being The Glorious Resolve, released in 2018.

Green Entertainment or Green TV, a Pakistani entertainment television channel, was launched reportedly under the management of the ISPR on July 10, 2023, having begun test broadcasts on 28 April. The channel's motto "Kyun Kay Main Green Hoon" (lit. 'Because I'm Green'), was released as a patriotic song upon its launch. Composed by Sahir Ali Bagga, it features several singers including Abida Parveen, Atif Aslam, Rahat Fateh Ali Khan, Shafqat Amanat Ali, Asim Azhar, Gul Panra, Ali Azmat. The channel is operated through a registered company called Al-Kamal Media and is licensed by PEMRA. The channel has released numerous Pakistani television dramas. However, in October 2024, Green Entertainment CEO Fasih Ur Rehman denied any affiliation with the ISPR and said that it was a privately owned business.

== List of Directors General ==
Rank and Name	Start of Term	End of Term
Colonel Shahbaz Khan	May 1949	July 1952
Commodore Maqbool Hussain	August 1952	October 1965
Colonel Z. A. Suleri	November 1965	August 1966
Lieutenant Colonel Masud Ahmed	September 1966	February 1967
Brigadier A.R. Siddiqui	March 1967	November 1973
Brigadier Fazal ur Rehman	December 1973	March 1977
Brigadier T H Siddiqui	April 1977	July 1985
Brigadier Siddique Salik	August 1985	17 August 1988
Major General Riaz Ullah	December 1988	September 1991
Major General Jahangir Nasrullah	October 1991	April 1993
Major General Khalid Bashir	May 1993	July 1994
Brigadier S M A Iqbal	August 1994	February 1995
Major General Saleem Ullah	March 1995	August 1998
Brigadier Ghazanfar Ali	September 1998	October 1998
Major General Rashid Qureshi	November 1998	May 2003
Major General Shaukat Sultan Khan	June 2003	February 2007
Major General Waheed Arshad	February 2007	January 2008
Major General Athar Abbas	January 2008	June 2012
Lieutenant General Asim Saleem Bajwa	3 June 2012	11 December 2016
Major General Asif Ghafoor	15 December 2016	31 January 2020
Lieutenant General Babar Iftikhar	1 February 2020	5 December 2022
Lieutenant General Ahmed Sharif Chaudhry	6 December 2022	Incumbent

== See also ==
- Pakistan Armed Forces
- Media of Pakistan
